= Kingfisher (disambiguation) =

The kingfisher is a bird in the family Alcedinidae.

Kingfisher may also refer to:

== Arts and entertainment ==
- The Kingfisher, an 1886 painting by Vincent Van Gogh
- Kingfisher, an album by the band Prawn
- "Kingfisher", a song on the 2010 album Have One on Me by Joanna Newsom
- "The Kingfishers", a poem by Charles Olson
- "Kingfisher", a novel by Gerald Seymour
- Racing Mount Pleasant, a band formerly known as Kingfisher

== Business ==
- Kingfisher Airlines, an airline based in India in operation from 2005 to 2012
- Kingfisher (beer), an Indian beer
- Kingfisher Books, a British children's book publisher
- Kingfisher plc, a British retail group
- Kingfisher International Pty Ltd an Australian fiber optic test equipment manufacturer
- Kingfisher Shopping Centre, Redditch, Worcestershire, England

== Military uses ==
- HMS Kingfisher, various British Royal Navy ships
- Kingfisher-class sloop, a patrol sloop class of the British Royal Navy
- USS Kingfisher, several United States Navy ships
- Operation Kingfisher, a Vietnam War United States Marine Corps operation
- Operation Kingfisher (World War II), a planned but never implemented operation to rescue prisoners of war from the Japanese
- Project Kingfisher, an American weapons development program 1944–1956
- Vought OS2U Kingfisher, an American observation floatplane
- Lockheed AQM-60 Kingfisher, a United States Air Force target drone
- CC-295 Kingfisher, a search-and-rescue variant of the EADS CASA C-295 transport aircraft

== Ships ==
- Kingfisher (sloop), a 1860s merchant trader in British Columbia, Canada
- Kingfisher (clipper), a 1863 California clipper
- Kingfisher (yacht), a racing vessel used by Ellen MacArthur
  - Kingfisher 2, a catamaran MacArthur captained in the 2003 Jules Verne Trophy competition

== Places ==
- Kingfisher County, Oklahoma
  - Kingfisher, Oklahoma, United States, a city and the county seat
- Kingfisher First Nation, a reservation in northern Ontario, Canada
  - Kingfisher 2A, a First Nations reserve in Ontario
  - Kingfisher 3A, a First Nations reserve in Ontario, on Kingfisher Lake
- Kingfisher Country Park, East Birmingham, West Midlands, England

== Sports ==
- Eisvögel USC Freiburg (Kingfishers), a German women's basketball team
- Kingfisher East Bengal F.C., a football team based in Kolkata, India
- Kingfisher (horse) (1867–1890), an American Thoroughbred racehorse

== Other uses ==
- Kingfisher College, Kingfisher, Oklahoma, a school from 1895 to 1922
- Kingfisher Tower, a folly on the eastern shore of Otsego Lake, New York, United States
- Kingfisher Tower (Utah), a sandstone landform, United States
- LNER Class A4 4483 Kingfisher, a UK steam locomotive
- T. Kingfisher, pen name of Ursula Vernon (born 1977), American freelance writer, artist and illustrator
- 500 Series Shinkansen, resembling a kingfisher birds beak
- Since 2019, "The Kingfisher" has been proposed as a potential mascot for the University of Illinois Urbana-Champaign after Chief Illiniwek was removed in 2007

== See also ==
- Kingfish (disambiguation)
- King Fisher (1853–1884), American Old West gunslinger
- Fisher King, a character in Arthurian lore
- The Fisher King, a 1991 American film starring Robin Williams and Jeff Bridges
- Kingfishr, an Irish indie folk group
