= Kingfish =

Kingfish may refer to:

== Fish ==
- Argyrosomus japonicus or Japanese meagre (Australia)
- Opah or Lampris guttatus (United Kingdom)
- Kanadi kingfish or Scomberomorus plurilineatus
- Kingcroaker or Menticirrhus spp.
- King mackerel or Scomberomorus cavalla
- Yellowtail amberjack or Seriola lalandi (Australia, New Zealand)
- Butterfly kingfish or Gasterochisma melampus (Australia, New Zealand)

== Military ==
- AS-6 Kingfish or Raduga KSR-5, an air-launched Soviet anti-ship and strike missile
- Convair Kingfish, a reconnaissance aircraft designed for Project GUSTO
- USS Kingfish, a Gato-class submarine of the United States Navy
- Kingfish, a nuclear test of the United States' Operation Fishbowl

== Music ==
- Christone "Kingfish" Ingram, American blues musician
  - Kingfish (Christone Ingram album), his first album
- Ed Manion, nicknamed "Kingfish", American saxophonist, touring member of the E Street Band
- Kingfish (band), a San Francisco Bay Area rock band
  - Kingfish (1976 album), their first album
  - Kingfish (1985 album), their fourth album
- "Kingfish", a 1974 song from Good Old Boys (Randy Newman album)
- "Kingfish", a 2010 song by Patrice Bart-Williams from his album One

== Sports ==
- Kenosha Kingfish, a baseball team in Kenosha, Wisconsin
- Baton Rouge Kingfish, a defunct minor league ice hockey team in Baton Rouge, Louisiana

== Television and radio ==
- Kingfish: A Story of Huey P. Long, a 1995 TV movie
- Kingfish, a character in Amos 'n' Andy

== Other uses ==
- KingFish phone tracker, a product line of human-portable cellular telephone identification and tracking devices
- Mafia Kingfish: Carlos Marcello and the Assassination of John F. Kennedy, 1989 non-fiction book by John H. Davis

== People with the nickname ==
- Christone "Kingfish" Ingram (born 1999), American blues guitarist
- King Levinsky (1910–1991), American heavyweight boxer
- Huey Long (1893–1935), Louisiana governor and senator
- Kenny Washington (American football) (1918–1971)

== See also ==
- Black kingfish
- Giant kingfish
- Kingfisher (disambiguation)
