= Kingfisher Lake 1 =

Kingfisher Lake 1 ᑮᐡᑭᒪᓂᐦᓰᐋᐧᐴᕽ
- Indian reserve
- Kingfisher Lake Indian Reserve No. 1
- Location within Ontario
- Coordinates: 53°05′N 89°49′W
- Country: Canada
- Province: Ontario
- District: Kenora
- First Nation: Kingfisher

Area
  - Land: 7.75 km^{2} (2.99 sq mi)

Population (2006)
  - Total: 415
  - Density: 53.5/km^{2} (139/sq mi)
- Website: www.kingfisherlake.ca

Kingfisher Lake 1 is a First Nations reserve in Kenora District, Ontario. It is one of the reserves of the Kingfisher First Nation.
