= The Kingfisher =

Painting by Vincent van Gogh

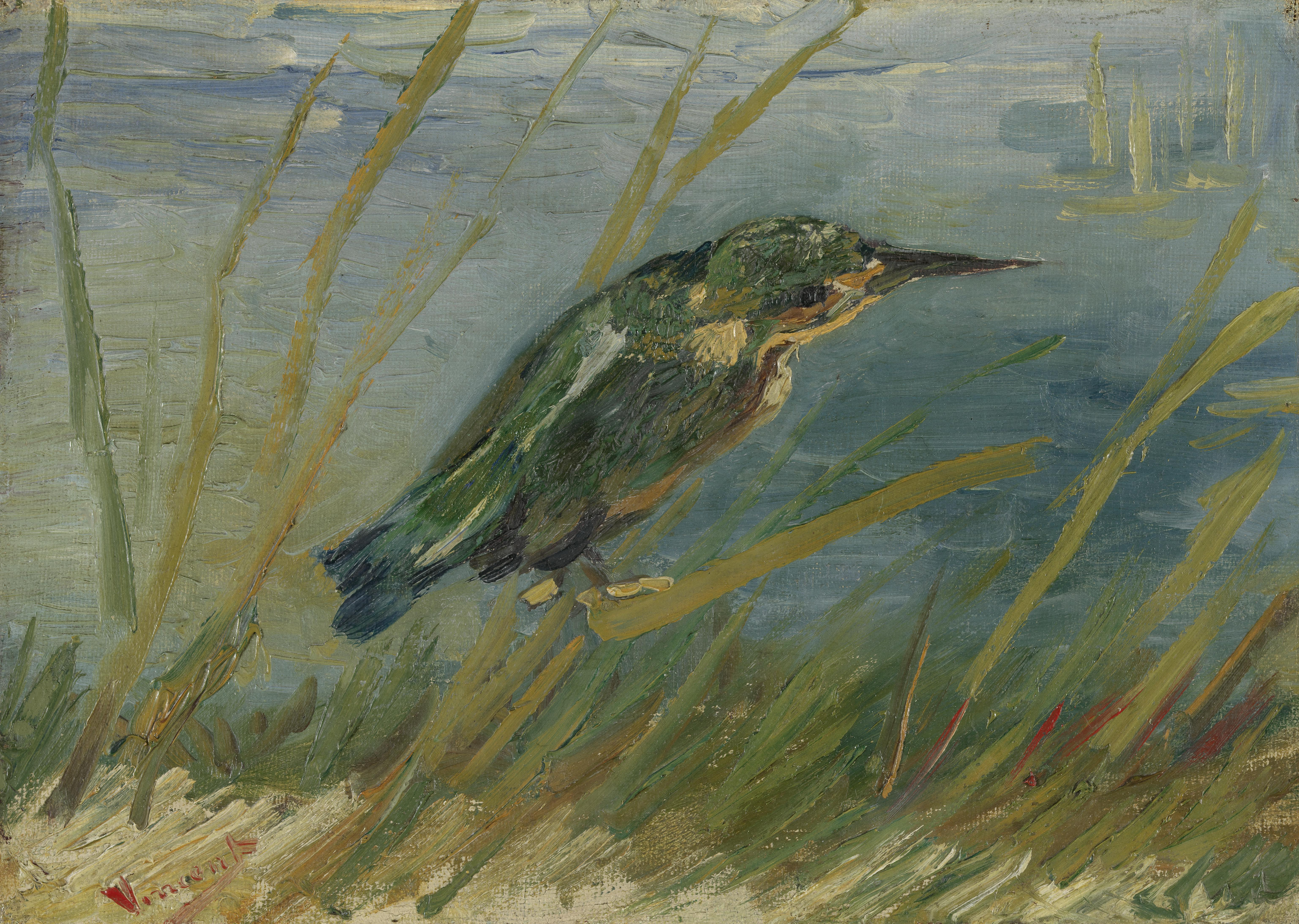
- Artist: Vincent van Gogh
- Year: 1886
- Catalogue: F28; JH1191
- Medium: Oil on canvas
- Dimensions: 19.0 cm × 26.5 cm (7.5 in × 10.4 in)
- Location: Van Gogh Museum, Amsterdam

The Kingfisher (Dutch: IJsvogel aan de waterkant) is an oil on canvas painting by the Dutch artist Vincent van Gogh. It was painted from July to December 1886. The Kingfisher was painted in Paris, France. It is now located in Amsterdam, Netherlands, at the Van Gogh Museum.

The Kingfisher shows a River Kingfisher in a marsh. The bird is facing the right of the painting. The name "Vincent" is in the lower left corner of the painting.

== See also ==
The Kingfisher (1884 version)
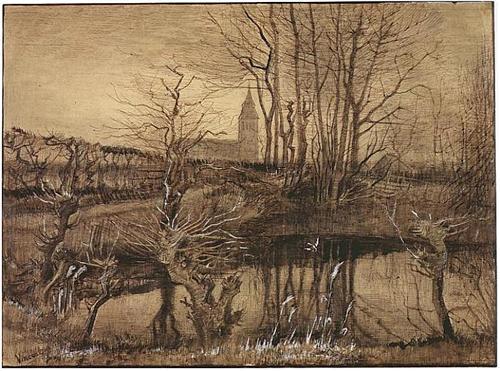
- This is an earlier version of the Kingfisher(1884)

- List of works by Vincent van Gogh
