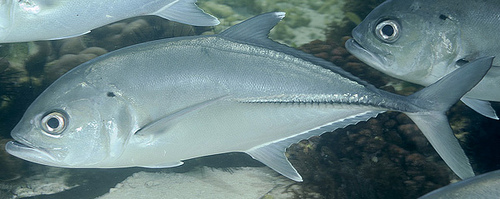

Conservation status
- Least Concern (IUCN 3.1)

Scientific classification
- Kingdom: Animalia
- Phylum: Chordata
- Class: Actinopterygii
- Order: Carangiformes
- Suborder: Carangoidei
- Family: Carangidae
- Genus: Caranx
- Species: C. sexfasciatus

Binomial name
- Caranx sexfasciatus Quoy & Gaimard, 1825
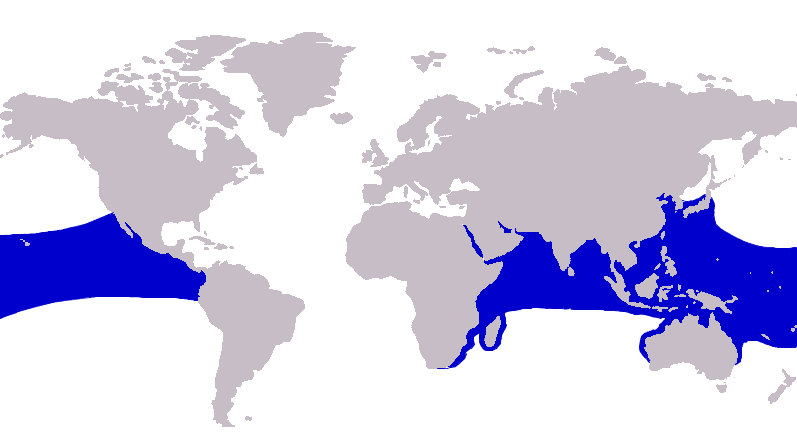
- Approximate range of the bigeye trevally

Synonyms
- List: Caranx belengerii Cuvier, 1833; Caranx forsteri Cuvier, 1833; Caranx peronii Cuvier, 1833; Caranx xanthopygus Cuvier, 1833; Caranx flavocoeruleus Temminck & Schlegel, 1844; Caranx paraspistes Richardson, 1848; Caranx tapeinosoma Bleeker, 1856; Carangus marginatus Gill, 1863; Caranx marginatus (Gill, 1863); Carangus rhabdotus Jenkins, 1903; Carangus elacate Jordan & Evermann, 1903; Caranx elacate (Jordan & Evermann, 1903); Caranx thompsoni Seale, 1905; Caranx butuanensis Seale, 1910; Caranx oshimai Wakiya, 1924

= Bigeye trevally =

Species of fish

The bigeye trevally (Caranx sexfasciatus), also known as the bigeye jack, great trevally, six-banded trevally and dusky jack, is a species of widespread large marine fish classified in the jack family Carangidae. The bigeye trevally is distributed throughout the tropical waters of the Indian and Pacific Oceans, ranging from South Africa in the west to California and Ecuador in the east, including Australia to the south and Japan in the north. The bigeye trevally is best distinguished by its colouration, having a dark second dorsal fin with a white tip on the lobe, and also possessing a small dark spot on the operculum. Other more detailed anatomical features also set the species apart from other members of Caranx. The species is known to grow to a length of 120 cm and 18 kg.

It is predominantly an inshore fish, inhabiting reefs down to depths of around 100 m in both coastal zones and offshore islands, often venturing into estuaries and sandy bays as juveniles. The bigeye trevally is commonly found in large slow moving schools during the day, becoming active at night when it feeds, taking a variety of fish, crustaceans, cephalopods and other invertebrates. The fish is known to move from a more crustacean dominated diet as a juvenile to a nearly completely fish dominated diet as an adult. Sexual maturity is reached at 42 cm, with spawning occurring in large aggregations occurring at different periods throughout its range, generally between July and March. The bigeye trevally is of moderate importance to fisheries throughout its range, and being of high importance to some artisanal fisheries. It is taken by gill net, purse seine, hook and line and other artisanal fishing methods. It is rated as a fair to good table fish. The species is also considered a good gamefish, taken by lure, bait and spear throughout its range.

== Taxonomy and naming ==
The bigeye trevally is classified within the genus Caranx, one of a number of groups known as the jacks or trevallies. Caranx itself is part of the larger jack and horse mackerel family Carangidae, which in turn is part of the order Carangiformes.

Prior to its description in 1825, the species was often confused with the similar-looking Atlantic species Caranx hippos, and its synonym Caranx carangus. The species was first properly scientifically described by the French naturalists Jean René Constant Quoy and Joseph Paul Gaimard in 1825 from a specimen collected off Waigeo, Indonesia which was designated to be the holotype. They named the species Caranx sexfasciatus which the species is still currently accepted as, with the specific epithet meaning 'six banded' in relation to its juvenile colouration. Following this, the species was independently redescribed and named around fifteen times, and incorrectly broken into two subspecies. In his massive ichthyological volume entitled Histoire Naturelle des Poissons, Georges Cuvier managed to assign no less than four junior synonyms to the species, while the most recent renaming was by Yojiro Wakiya in 1924, who applied the name Caranx oshimai. The two subspecies proposed were Caranx sexfaciatus elacate and Caranx sexfaciatus marginatus, both based on prior descriptions by Jordan and Evermann, and Gill respectively. All names except Caranx sexfasciatus are considered junior synonyms under ICZN rules and discarded.

The common name preferred by most authorities is 'bigeye trevally', 'bigeye kingfish', 'bigeye crevalle jack' or bigeye jack', with other names used including 'great trevally', 'six-banded trevally' and 'dusky jack'.

== Distribution and habitat ==
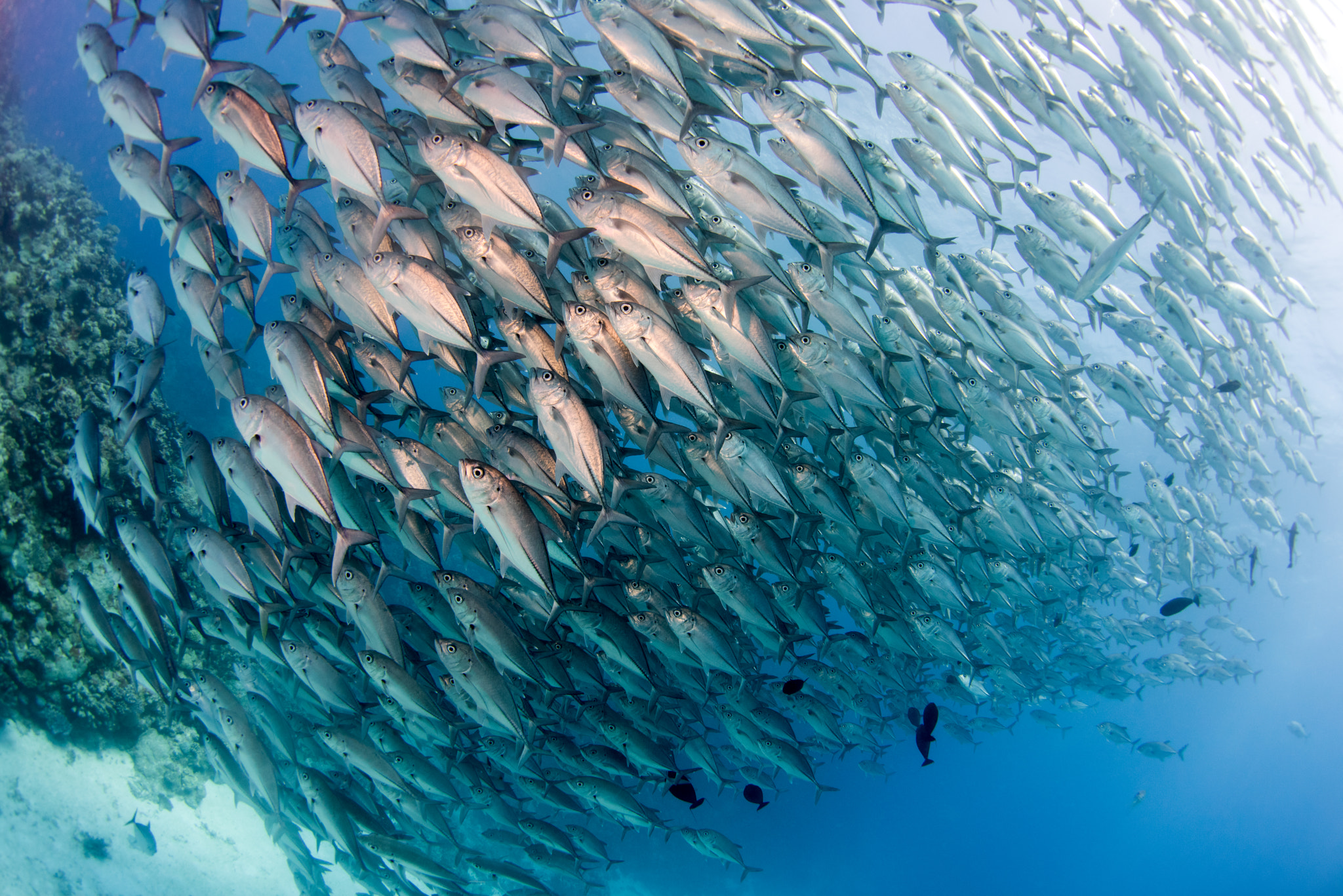
In Queensland, Australia

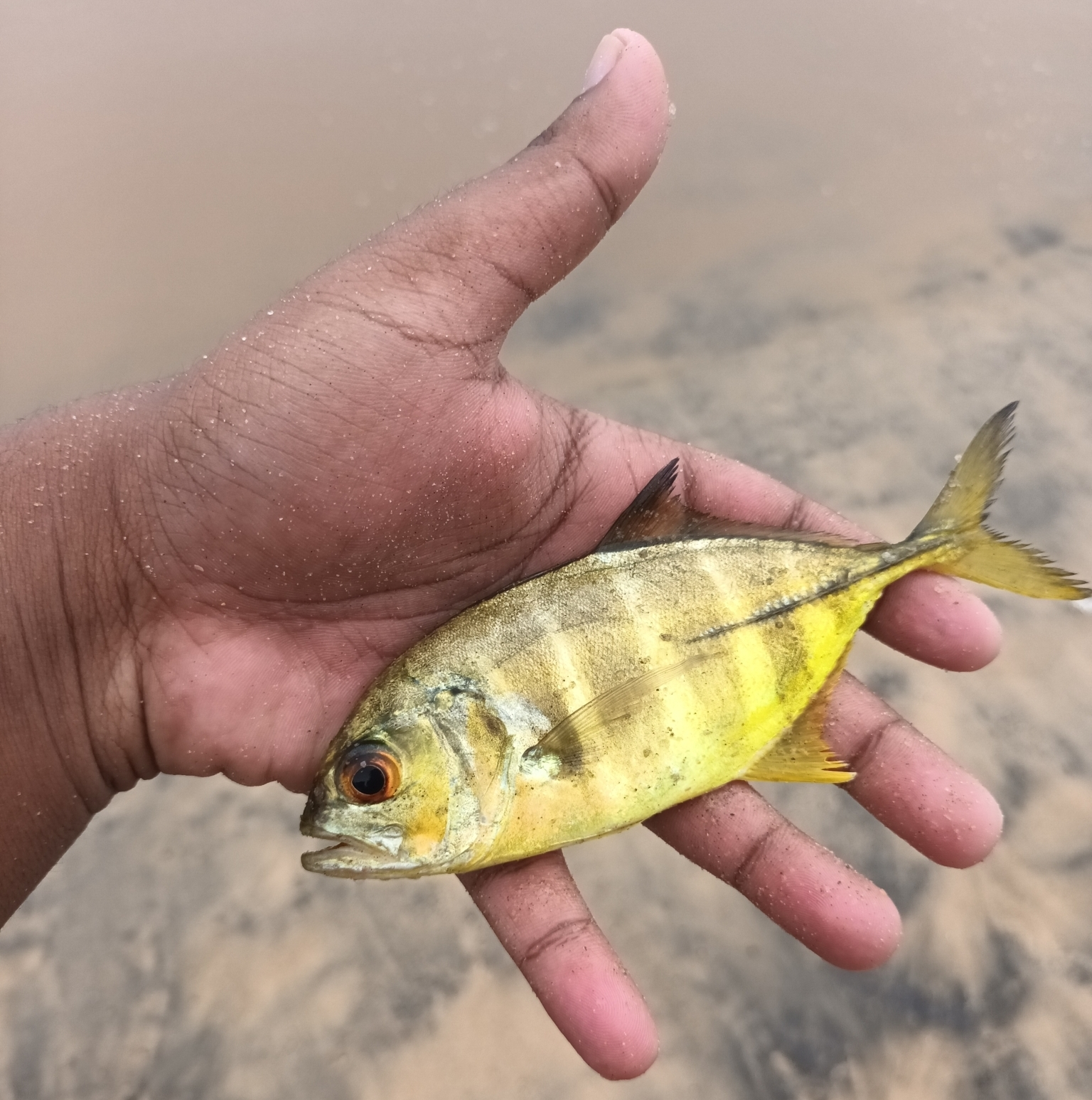
Juvenile, in India

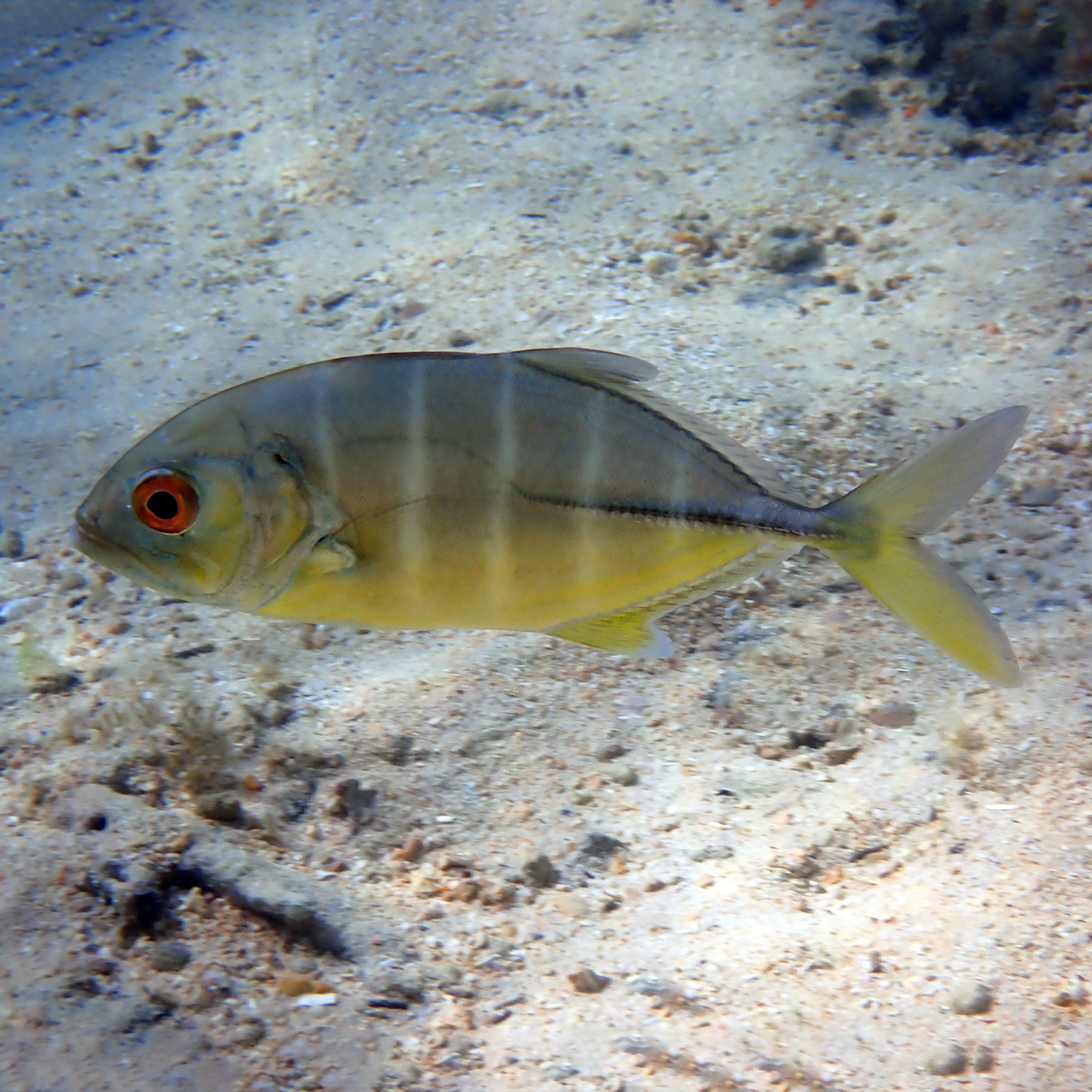
At Norfolk Island

The bigeye trevally is widely distributed throughout the tropical and subtropical waters of both the Indian and Pacific Oceans. In the Indian Ocean, it ranges from South Africa and Madagascar in the west, along the east African coastline up to both the Red Sea and Persian Gulf. Its range extends east along India, South East Asia, Indonesia and many offshore Indian Ocean islands. The range extends north to Japan and south to Australia in this central Indo-pacific region. In the Pacific Ocean, the bigeye trevally inhabits most of the tropical island groups including Hawaii, with its range extending east to the western American coastline. In this eastern region of its distribution it has been recorded from the American state of California in the north, including the Gulf of California, and south to Ecuador and the Galapagos Islands.

The bigeye trevally predominantly live in inshore coastal waters, although does occur in pelagic settings far offshore, and around remote islands and seamounts. The species is known to reach depths of around 100 m. It is mostly found over coral and rocky reef complexes as adults, however often moves into more inshore areas in sandy bays and lagoons in small numbers. Those that live offshore often live on deeper seamounts or reefs around offshore islands. The species moves with the tide in some regions, entering shallow lagoonal areas as the tide rises, and moving back to the deeper reefs as it retreats. Juveniles inhabit more inshore, shallower waters around the coast, often venturing into lagoons, tidal flats, mangrove zones and even estuaries. Juvenile bigeye trevally have been reported in rivers from several locations, and are known to penetrate well into the upper reaches of rivers. As the fish grows, it moves back to deeper waters over reefs. The species has been reported in pelagic open ocean settings, milling around stationary buoys, indicating the species may follow floating debris far out to sea.

== Description ==
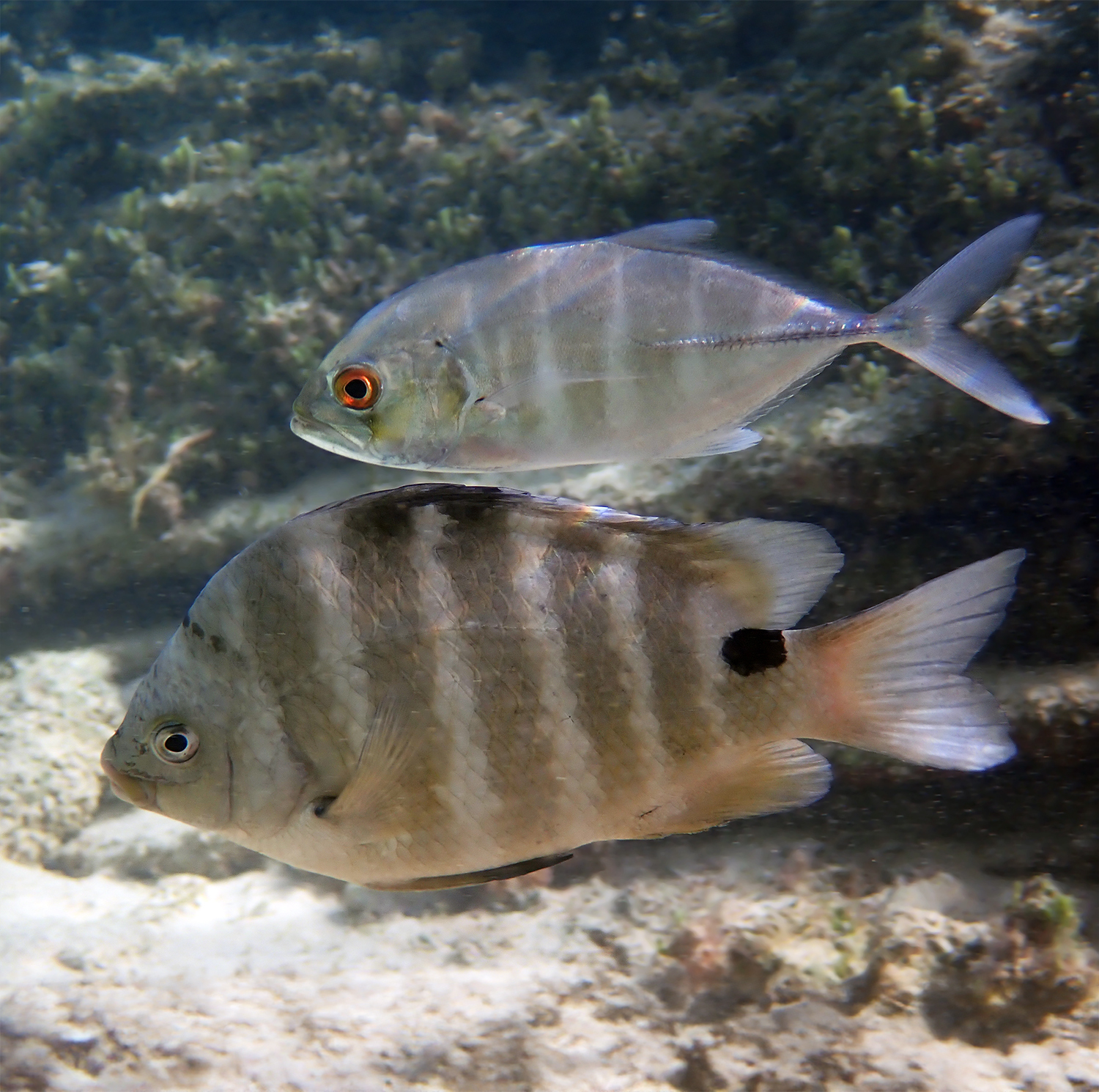
With a blackspot sergeant, at Norfolk Island

The bigeye trevally is one of the larger members of Caranx, growing to a maximum recorded size of 120 cm in length and 18.0 kg in weight. It is similar to most other jacks in having a compressed, oblong body, with the dorsal profile slightly more convex than the ventral profile, particularly anteriorly. The snout is slightly pointed, and is greater in length than the eye diameter. The dorsal fin is in two distinct sections; the first consisting of 8 spine and the second of 1 spine and 19 to 22 soft rays. The anal fin consists of 2 anteriorly detached spines followed by 1 spine and 14 to 17 soft rays. The pelvic fins consists of 1 spine and 17 to 18 soft rays, while the caudal fin is strongly forked and the pectoral fin falcate. The species lateral line is moderately arched anteriorly, with 49 to 50 scales in this section, while the straight section contains 0 to 3 scales and 27 to 36 strong scutes. The breast is completely covered in scales. The species has well-developed adipose eyelids, while its dentition consists of an outer row of widely spaced canine teeth and an inner band of villiform teeth in the upper jaw, with a row of widely spaced conical teeth on the lower jaw. The bigeye trevally has 21 to 25 gill rakers and 25 vertebrae.

The bigeye trevally shows a change in colour as it ages, changing both overall colour and body patterns. Juveniles are a silvery yellow to silvery brown in colour, and possess five to six dark vertical bands on their sides, from which the specific epithet sexfasciatus arose. As they mature, the bands fade and become indistinct and the overall colour shifts to a silvery blue above and whitish below. In adults, the bars are completely absent and the dorsal colour is a silvery olive to blue green, fading to silvery white below. In juveniles, the fins are pale grey to yellow with darker edges, becoming darker overall in adulthood, with the anal and caudal fins yellow to black and the second dorsal fin olive to black. The tip of the second dorsal fin has a distinctive white tip. The bigeye trevally also has a small dark opercular spot on the upper margin.

== Biology ==
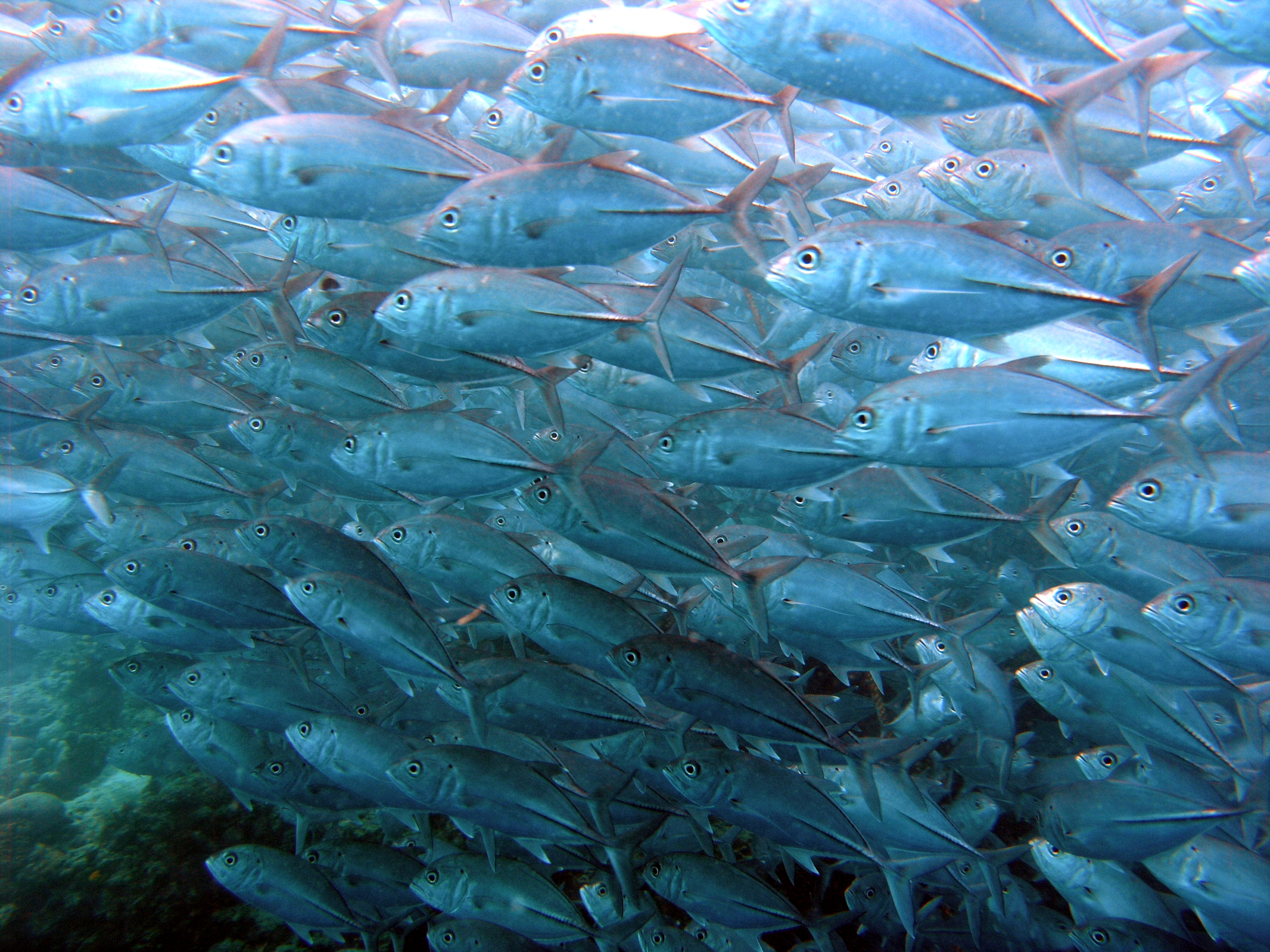
A large school of bigeye trevally in Malaysia

The bigeye trevally is a schooling species, known to form aggregations consisting of more than 1500 fish. The species is often seen in these large schools either stationary or slowly moving around the reef complexes they inhabit during the day. At night, these schools dissolve, and the species become active, taking most of its prey during the nocturnal period. This contrasts to most jacks, which are generally diurnal hunters, although the species has been documented hunting in shallower waters during the day, especially as juveniles. The abundance of the species on the west coast of America has been linked to the occurrence of El Niño or La Niña climate events, with the abundance significantly dropping during El Niño events.

=== Diet and feeding ===
The bigeye trevally is a fast-swimming predatory species that has had several studies determine its diet in various places throughout its distribution. As mentioned above, the species is mostly inactive during the day, and feeds at dusk and through the night. The large stationary aggregations break off as the fish move off to hunt in small groups or individually. The species predominantly takes small fish as prey, however supplements its diet with a varied array of invertebrates. These include crustaceans such as shrimps, decapods, copepods and stomatopods, cephalopods, gastropods, jellyfish, sponges and even species of open ocean sea-skater insects. Bigeye trevally were found to be the primary fish predators of these sea-skates, and took far more of these than any other species of carangid. Evidence from South African estuaries indicates there is a shift in the species diet as it grows. Young fish below 200 mm in length take mostly the juveniles of other fish species but still have a significant intake of penaeid shrimps, while fish larger than this take small fish nearly exclusively. The larger fish on reefs tend to move between these reefs regularly, which is thought to be due to prey availability. Bigeye trevally are also an important prey for larger species, ranging from sharks and larger species of carangid to sea lions and various birds.

=== Reproduction and growth ===
A large school of bigeye trevally on the move

The bigeye trevally reaches sexual maturity at a length of around 42 cm, with both males and females reaching maturity at a similar length and age. Spawning is known to occur between July and September in the east Pacific and in November to March in South Africa, indicating variation across the species range. There is also evidence that spawning may occur during new moon periods. Fish aggregate in large schools prior to spawning, with pairs breaking off the main aggregation to commence spawning. The pair increase their swimming speed to leave the school, with the fish underneath instantly changing colour to a dark black, with this individual also known to chase off any other individuals that approach the pair. The trevally then press their ventral surfaces together to spawn, often swimming almost horizontally, before returning to the school and changing back to their normal silvery colour.

The larvae of bigeye trevally have been extensively described, with defining features being a conspicuously pigmented supraoccipital crest, relatively deep body and an anal fin ray count of 15 to 17, the lowest of any east Pacific carangid. There has been little research into the later stages of growth and their rates. Juveniles are known to inhabit either inshore habitats such as estuaries, with an influx of these small fish after spawning in South Africa, while in other cases juveniles have been found living pelagically around floating objects.

There has been one documented hybrid involving the bigeye trevally, a cross between C. sexfasciatus and C. melampygus (bluefin trevally), taken from the waters of Kane'ohe Bay, Hawaii. The specimen was initially thought to be a bigeye trevally, however a lack of the black opercular spot, light coloured scutes and a smaller than normal eye led to the specimen being examined in more detail. DNA analysis confirmed a hybrid between C. sexfasciatus and C. melampygus, which has been difficult to explain due to the two species vastly different lifestyles and spawning characteristics.

=== Parasites ===
As all fish species, the bigeye trevally harbours parasites. These include Monogeneans, Digeneans, Acanthocephalans, Nematodes, Copepodes, and Isopodes; of these, the protomicrocotylid monogenean Neomicrocotyle pacifica is the more abundant.

== Relationship to humans ==
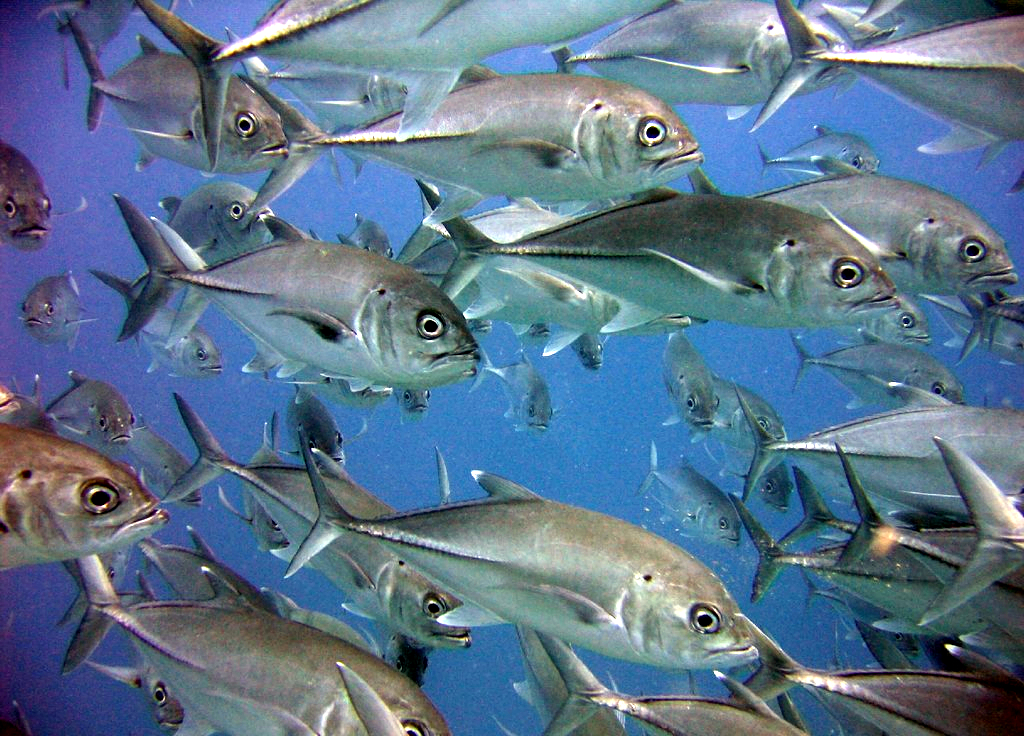
A small school of bigeye trevally over a bommie on the Great Barrier Reef

The bigeye trevally is of varying importance to both commercial and recreational fisheries throughout its range, with the large school sizes allowing for large catches in some regions. In many regions the species is lumped with other jacks in fishery statistics, and therefore worldwide catch is nearly impossible to estimate. Known recent annual catches include those of Saudi Arabia (615–638 t), Mexico (900 t), and Hawaii (297 lb). The species is especially important in fisheries based around coral reefs, with one such fishery in Papua New Guinea showing bigeye trevally are the most frequently taken carangid, and one of the top five most important species overall. It is also of high importance in small artisanal and subsistence fisheries, for which statistics are not kept. Bigeye trevally are taken by a number of methods including hook and line, gill nets, purse seines and various other netting methods. Due to their nocturnal hunting nature, a popular way to catch large numbers involves illuminating the water surface at night, and using hook and line to catch the fish attracted by the light. The species is sold fresh, dried and salted at market.

The bigeye trevally is also popular with anglers, with the species rated as an excellent gamefish in larger sizes. The species is commonly taken by boat fishermen over reef complexes, however schools often hang around jetties and wharves, allowing for frantic fishing when the fish are on the bite, especially after dusk. The species is also occasionally taken from beaches, but rarely in large quantities. Common techniques for catching the fish include bait fishing, which can involve both live or dead bit including fish, squid or various crustaceans, or lure fishing. Bigeye trevally are known to accept many lure types including bibbed lures, surface poppers and metal slugs jigged in rapid retrieve from the ocean floor. Soft plastic lures are known to take the species, as are saltwater fly patterns. In larger sizes, gear must be robust and well maintained to land the fish. The IGFA maintains a full set of line class and tippet records for the bigeye jack. The all tackle world record stands at 14.30 kg (31 lb 8 oz) caught off Poivre Island in the Seychelles.

The bigeye trevally's edibility is said to range from fair to very good, with frying, steaming, grilling and even use in soup popular in some South East Asian countries. Filipinos are said to consider the fish of high quality, especially fish taken from the volcanic Lake Taal, which are said to have a delicate flavour due to the lake's sulphur content. Apart from fishing, the species is popular with scuba divers which often photograph the huge schools that mill around reefs during the day. Bigeye trevally have also been held in large saltwater aquaria, however require large tank volumes to survive.
