= Kingfisher 2A =

- Indian reserve
- Kingfisher Indian Reserve No. 2A
- Location within Ontario
- Coordinates: 52°58′N 89°45′W
- Country: Canada
- Province: Ontario
- District: Kenora
- First Nation: Kingfisher

Area
  - Land: 54.45 km^{2} (21.02 sq mi)

Kingfisher 2A is a First Nations reserve on the Pipestone River in northwestern Ontario. It is one of three reserves of the Kingfisher First Nation.
