= Kingfisher 3A =

- Indian reserve
- Kingfisher Indian Reserve No. 3A
- Location within Ontario
- Coordinates: 52°54.5′N 89°45′W
- Country: Canada
- Province: Ontario
- District: Kenora
- First Nation: Kingfisher

Area
  - Land: 9.22 km^{2} (3.56 sq mi)

Kingfisher 3A is a First Nations reserve on Kingfisher Lake in northwestern Ontario. It is one of three reserves of the Kingfisher First Nation.
