= Kingfisher First Nation =

First Nation in Ontario, Canada

Coordinates: 53°01′37″N 89°50′28″W

- Band No. 212
- People: Anisininew
- Treaty: Treaty 9
- Province: Ontario

Land
- Main reserve: Kingfisher Lake 1
- Reserves: Kingfisher 2A; Kingfisher 3A
- Land area: 69.62 km^{2} (26.88 sq mi)

Population (2025)
- On reserve: 571
- On other land: 9
- Off reserve: 63
- Total population: 643

Tribal Council
- Shibogama First Nations Council

Location of Kingfisher First Nation in Ontario

Kingfisher First Nation (Oji-Cree language: ᑮᐡᑭᒪᓂᐦᓰᐋᐧᐴᕽ (Giishkimanisiiwaaboong, "At Kingfisher-waters"); unpointed: ᑭᐡᑭᒪᓂᓯᐊᐧᐳᐠ) is an Anisininew First Nation reserve located 350 kilometres (220 mi) north of Sioux Lookout, Ontario, Canada. It is accessible by air all year and by waterway in summer and ice roads in winter. As of December 2009, the First Nation had a total registered population of 500 people, the on-reserve population being 462. The community speaks the Oji-Cree language, but most of it is fluent in English as well.

The police that serve Kingfisher Lake are the Nishnawbe-Aski Police Service, an Aboriginal-based service.

== History ==
In 1808 the Hudson's Bay Company established an outpost at Big Beaver House, located approximately 12 kilometres southwest of the present Kingfisher Lake reserve. Big Beaver House was frequented by Kingfisher Lake people for trading fur, community activity and freight hauling employment.

In 1929 to 1930, the leaders of Kingfisher Lake First Nation were required to gather at Big Trout Lake to participate in the signing of the adhesion to Treaty 9. As the result, Kingfisher Lake was considered a part of Big Trout Lake Band.

In 1947, Ontario enacted the Trapline Registration and Fee Program, which eventually forced the Kingfisher Lake people to outline their ancestral hunting areas into trapping boundaries and also to pay for the land use requirements.

In 1964, the leaders of Kingfisher Lake decided to establish permanent community and to move to the current location of the reserve lands. As Kingfisher Lake was already included in the Big Trout Lake Band and so had reserve status, the formality of gaining band status was achieved in 1975.

In 2011, many of the residents were temporarily housed in Ottawa because of forest fires in the surrounding area.

== Governance ==
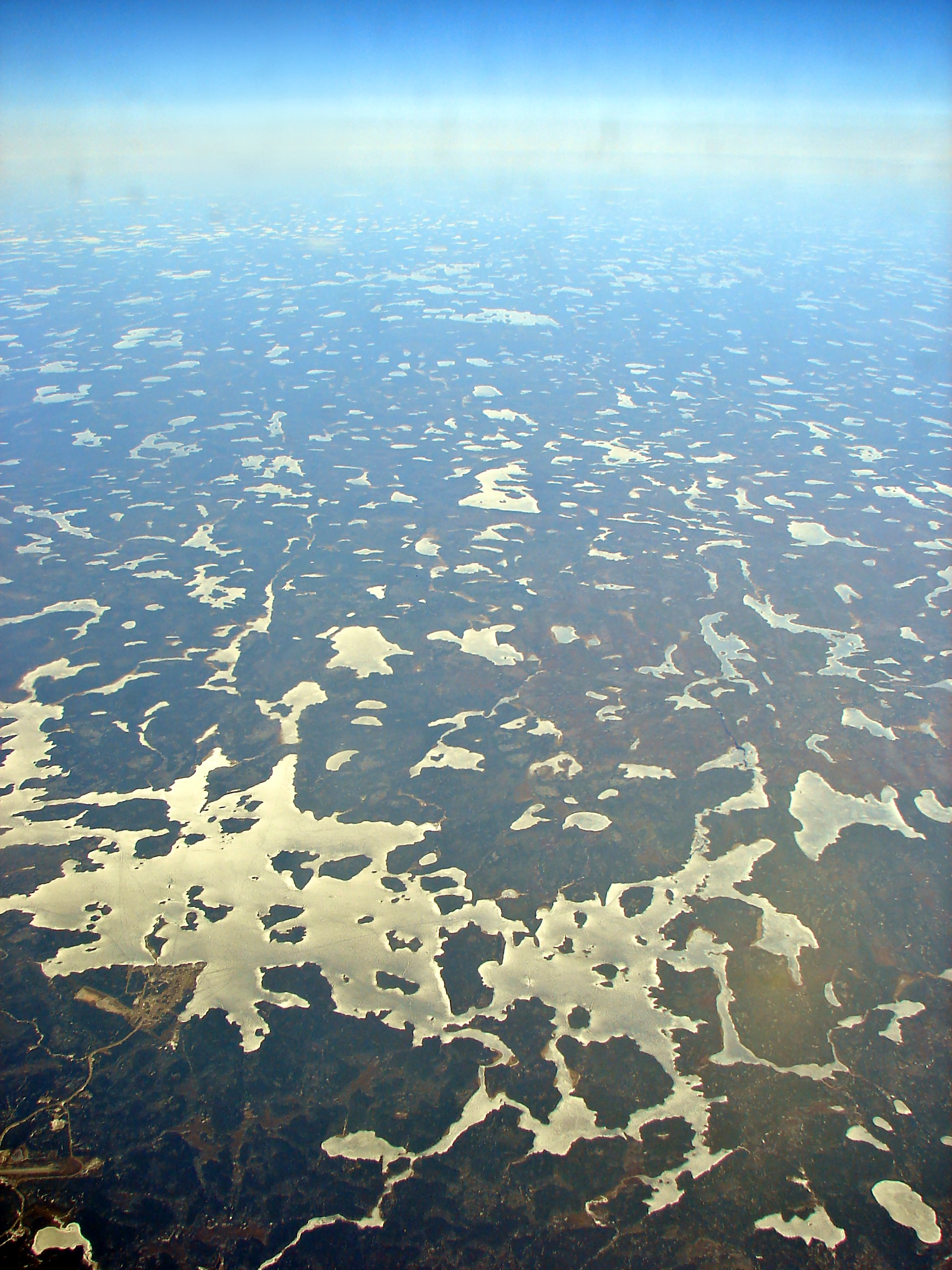
Aerial view of Kingfisher Lake, with the community of Kingfisher Lake in bottom left.

The officials of Kingfisher First Nation are elected for a two-year term through the Custom Electoral System. Their council consists of Chief Eddie Mamakwa, Deputy Chief Verna Aganash and four Councillors: Danny Sainnawap, Esther Sakakeep, Matthew Sainnawap, and Samuel Sturgeon.

The First Nation is part of the Shibogama First Nations Council, a Regional Chiefs Council, and the Nishnawbe Aski Nation, a Tribal Political Organization representing majority of the First Nations in northern Ontario.

== Reserve ==
The First Nation have reserved three tracts for their Indian reserve:

- 596 hectares (1,470 acres) Kingfisher Lake 1 Indian Reserve, which serves as their main Reserve, containing the community of Kingfisher Lake, Ontario.
- 5,444.7 hectares (13,454 acres) Kingfisher 2A Indian Reserve
- 921.9 hectares (2,278 acres) Kingfisher 3A Indian Reserve
