= USS Kingfisher =

USS Kingfisher is a name used by four ships of the U.S. Navy:

- USS Kingfisher (1861) was a bark purchased by the Navy at Boston, Massachusetts, 2 August 1861.
- USS Kingfisher (SP-76), a motor launch, was built in 1916 by George Lawley & Sons, Neponset, Massachusetts.
- USS Kingfisher (AM-25) launched 30 March 1918 by Puget Sound Naval Shipyard, Puget Sound, Washington.
- USS Kingfisher (MHC-56) is the sixth ship of Osprey-class coastal minehunters.
