= HMS Kingfisher =

Fourteen ships of the Royal Navy have borne the name Kingfisher (or King's Fisher), after the kingfisher bird:

- Kingfisher was a ship in service between 1664 and 1667.
- HMS Kingfisher (1675) was a 46-gun fourth-rate ship of the line built in 1675, rebuilt in 1699 and broken up in 1728.
- Kingfisher was a 4-gun ketch purchased in 1684 and captured by the French in 1690.
- HMS Kingfisher (1745) (or Kings Fisher) was a 14-gun sloop launched at Gosport. She was converted into an 8-gun bomb vessel and served as such between 1758 and 1760. She was sold in 1763.
- HMS Kingfisher (1770) was a 14-gun sloop launched in 1770 and burnt to avoid capture in 1778.
- HMS Kingfisher (1782) was an 18-gun brig-sloop launched in 1782, having been purchased in the stocks. She was wrecked in 1798.
- HMS Kingfisher (1804) was an 18-gun sloop launched in 1804 and broken up in 1816.
- HMS Kingfisher (1823) was a 10-gun Cherokee-class brig-sloop launched in 1823 that became a Post Office Packet Service packet, sailing out of Falmouth, Cornwall. She was sold in 1838.
- HMS Kingfisher (1845) was a 12-gun brig launched in 1845. She was laid up in 1852, and was then on harbour service from 1875. She was sold in 1890.
- HMS Kingfisher (1879) was an Doterel-class sloop launched in 1879. She became a training ship and was renamed HMS Lark in 1892, and then HMS Cruizer in 1893. She was sold in 1919.
- HMS Kingfisher was a 16-gun brig launched in 1850 as HMS Martin. She was renamed HMS Kingfisher in 1890, when she became a training brig. She was sold in 1907.
- HMS Kingfisher was to have been a river gunboat. She was ordered in 1912, but was subsequently cancelled.
- HMS Kingfisher (L70) was a Kingfisher-class sloop launched in 1935 and sold in 1947.
- HMS Kingfisher (1954) was a King Salvor-class salvage vessel previously HMS King Salvor renamed in 1954 and in service until 1960 when she was sold to the Argentine Navy.
- HMS Kingfisher (P260) was a Bird-class patrol vessel launched in 1974 and sold in 1996.

== See also ==
- HMS Kingfish, a brig listed in service between 1807 and 1814.
- HMT Kingfisher, a naval trawler equipped with a floatplane during the Battle of Jutland.
