= Coastal fish =

Fish that inhabit the sea between the shoreline and the edge of the continental shelf

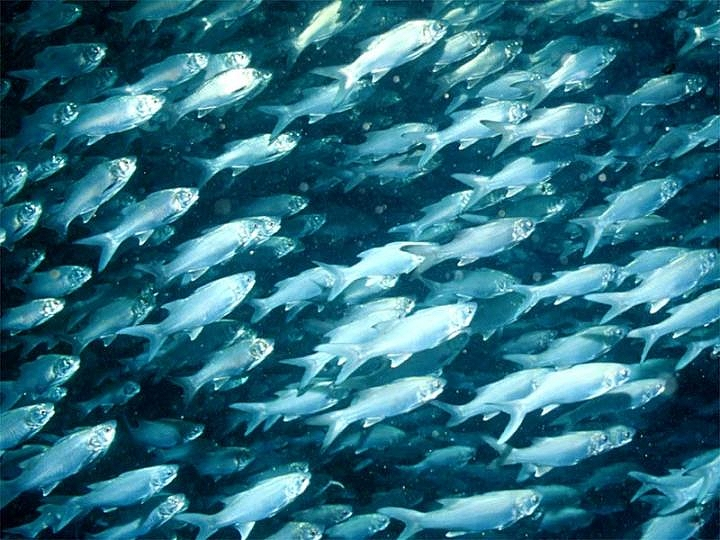
Schooling threadfin, a coastal species

Coastal fish, also called inshore fish or neritic fish, inhabit the sea between the shoreline and the edge of the continental shelf. Since the continental shelf is usually less than 200 metres (660 ft) deep, it follows that pelagic coastal fish are generally epipelagic fish, inhabiting the sunlit epipelagic zone. Coastal fish can be contrasted with oceanic fish or offshore fish, which inhabit the deep seas beyond the continental shelves.

Coastal fish are the most abundant in the world. They can be found in tidal pools, fjords and estuaries, near sandy shores and rocky coastlines, around coral reefs and on or above the continental shelf. Coastal fish include forage fish and the predator fish that feed on them. Forage fish thrive in inshore waters where high productivity results from upwelling and shoreline run off of nutrients. Some are partial residents that spawn in streams, estuaries and bays, but most complete their life cycles in the zone.

== Coastal habitats ==
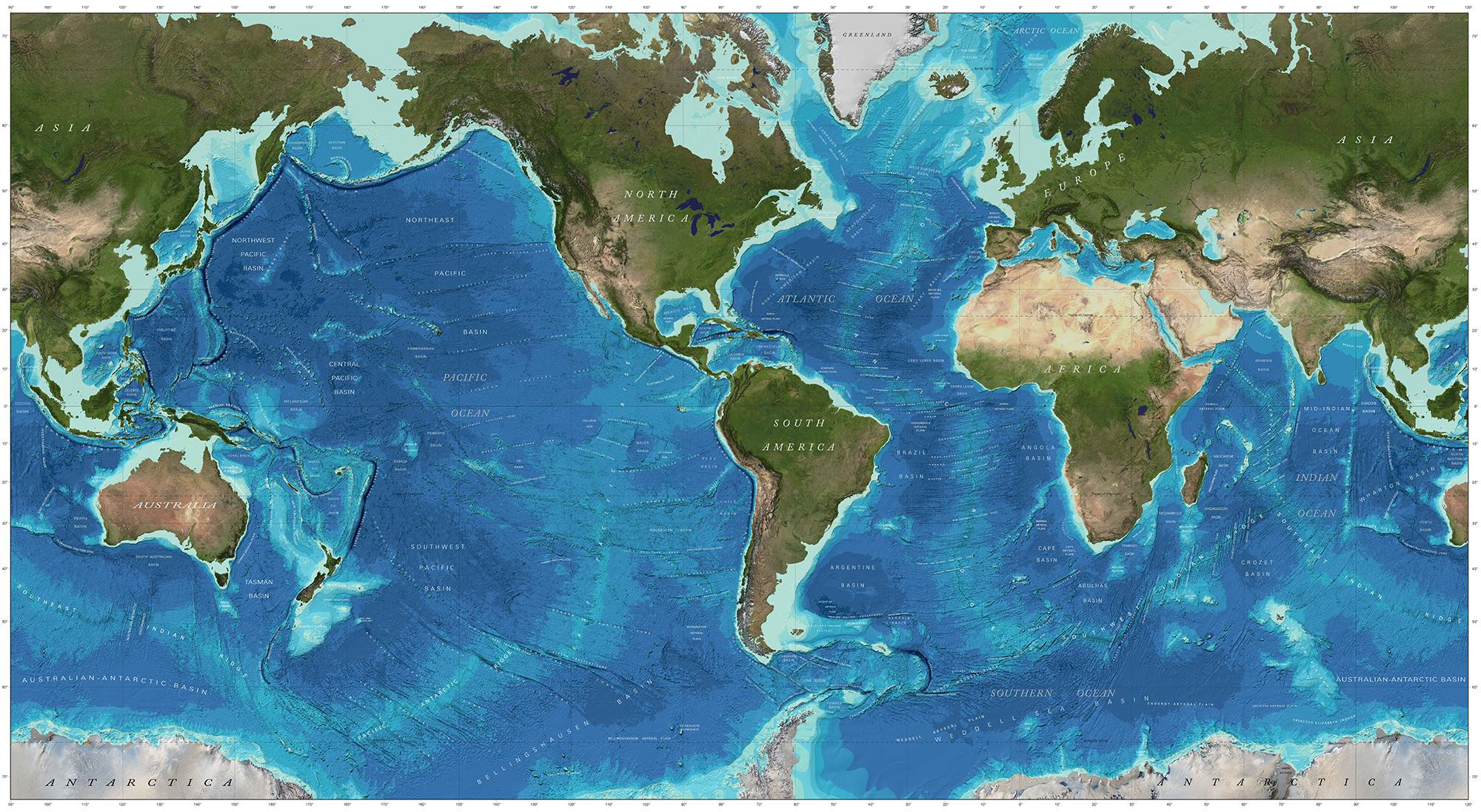

Coastal fish are found in the waters above the continental shelves that extend from the continental shorelines, and around the coral reefs that surround volcanic islands. The total world shoreline extends for 356,000 km (221,000 mi) and the continental shelves occupy a total area of 24.3 million km^{2} (9 376 million sq mi). This is nearly 5% of the world's total area of 510 million km^{2}.

== Nearshore fish ==
Nearshore fish, sometimes called littoral fish, live close to the shore. They are associated with the intertidal zone, or with estuaries, lagoons, coral reefs, kelp forests, seagrass meadows, or rocky or sandy bottoms, usually in shallow waters less than about 10 m (33 ft) deep.

=== Intertidal fish ===
Intertidal zones

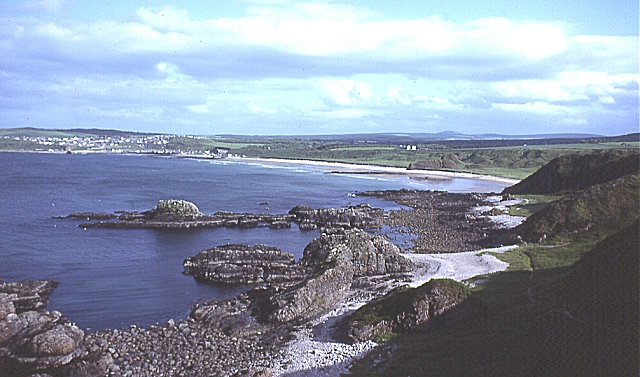
The rise and fall of tides on a seashore
defines an intertidal zone

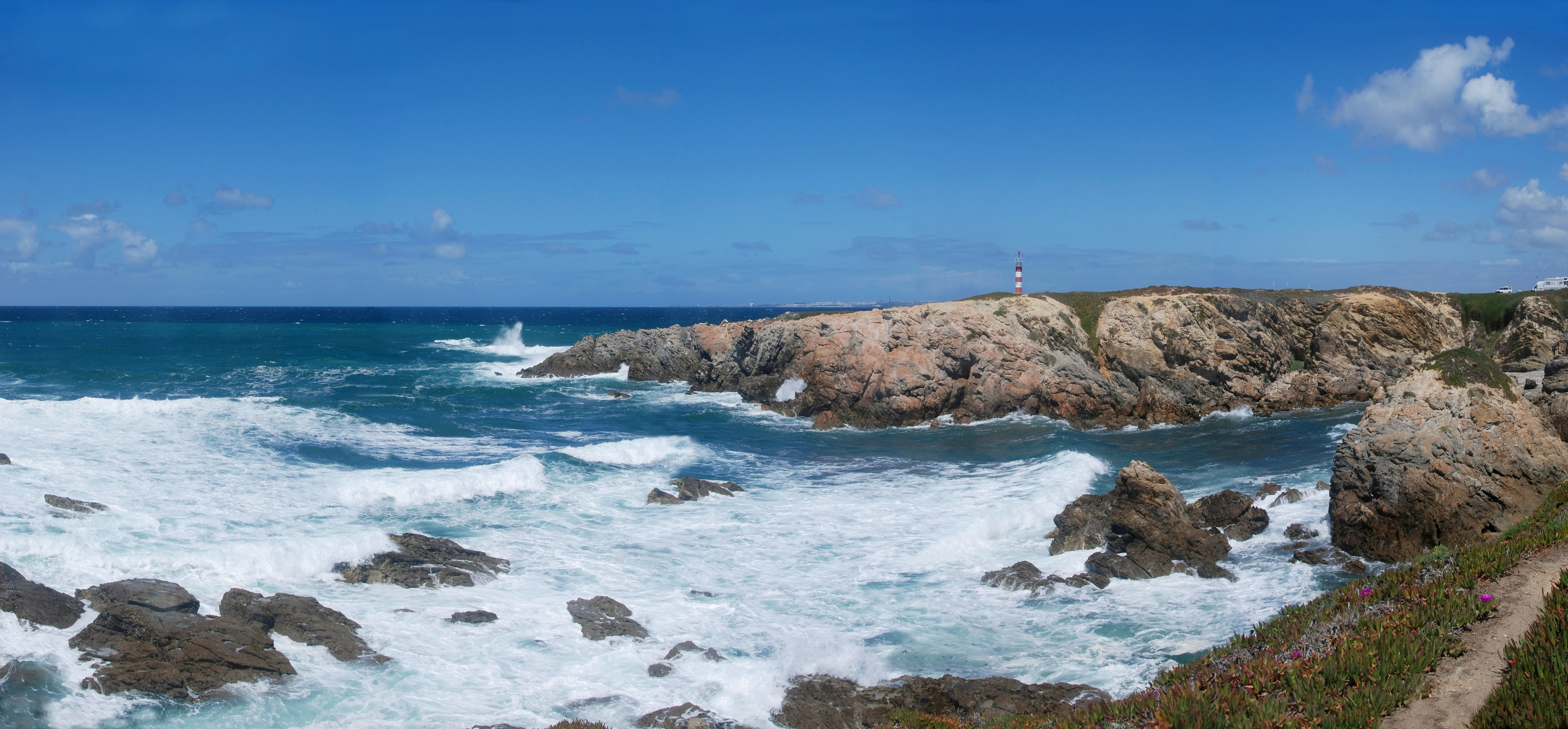
Intertidal zones can be a volatile habitat for fish

Intertidal fish are fish that move in and out with the tide in the intertidal zone of the seashore, or are found in rock pools or under rocks.

The intertidal zone of rocky shores can contain indentations which trap pools of salty water, called rock pools. Living in these habitats are communities of hardy plant and animal species specially adapted for coping with the volatile environment around them. The plants and animals interact with each other and with the rock pool to form miniature ecosystems, easily accessible to students and a source of fascination for young children. Plants such as seaweeds, cnidarians such as sea anemones, arthropods like barnacles, and molluscs such as the common limpet and the common periwinkle can be permanent residents of rock pools. But most rock pool animals, such as crabs, shrimp and fish are just temporary residents, occupying a rock pool only until the next tide takes them to a new location.

Some rock pool fish which are temporary residents include the long-spined sea scorpion, the pipefish worm, the rock goby and the common lumpsucker. However some other rock pool fish are territorial in nature, and will stay with the same pool for extended periods. Examples are the common blenny and its near relative the butterfish.

- The common blenny, also known as the shanny, is found in northern temperate waters. They hide under rocks and in crannies in rock pools when the tide is out. They feed on green seaweed and invertebrates such as barnacles. They can crawl on dry land, using their paired fins. About 16 cm (6.3 in) long, they have smooth skin, without scales, and are covered with soft slime. The slime prevents them drying if they are stranded on a shore between tides. So long as their skin stays moist, they can breathe out of water. They are sometimes called "sea frogs" because they bask in the sun on weeds outside the water, and like frogs, jump to safety when disturbed. They can change their colour to match their surroundings. The female lays eggs in crevices or under stones and the male guards them until they hatch. In the winter, when storms can be severe, they move out of their rock pools into the shallows. The common blenny is bold with strong teeth, and will bite humans if it feels threatened.
- The rock goby is a small fish, about 12 cm (4.7 in), found in northern temperate waters. It is coloured black with white blotches, and hides under stones and amongst seaweed. It is a temporary resident of rock pools when the tide is out. The female rock goby lays eggs on the underside of rocks and shells and then leaves them. The male guards the eggs until they hatch. First-year rock gobies often visit rock pools in winter when the older fish have left.
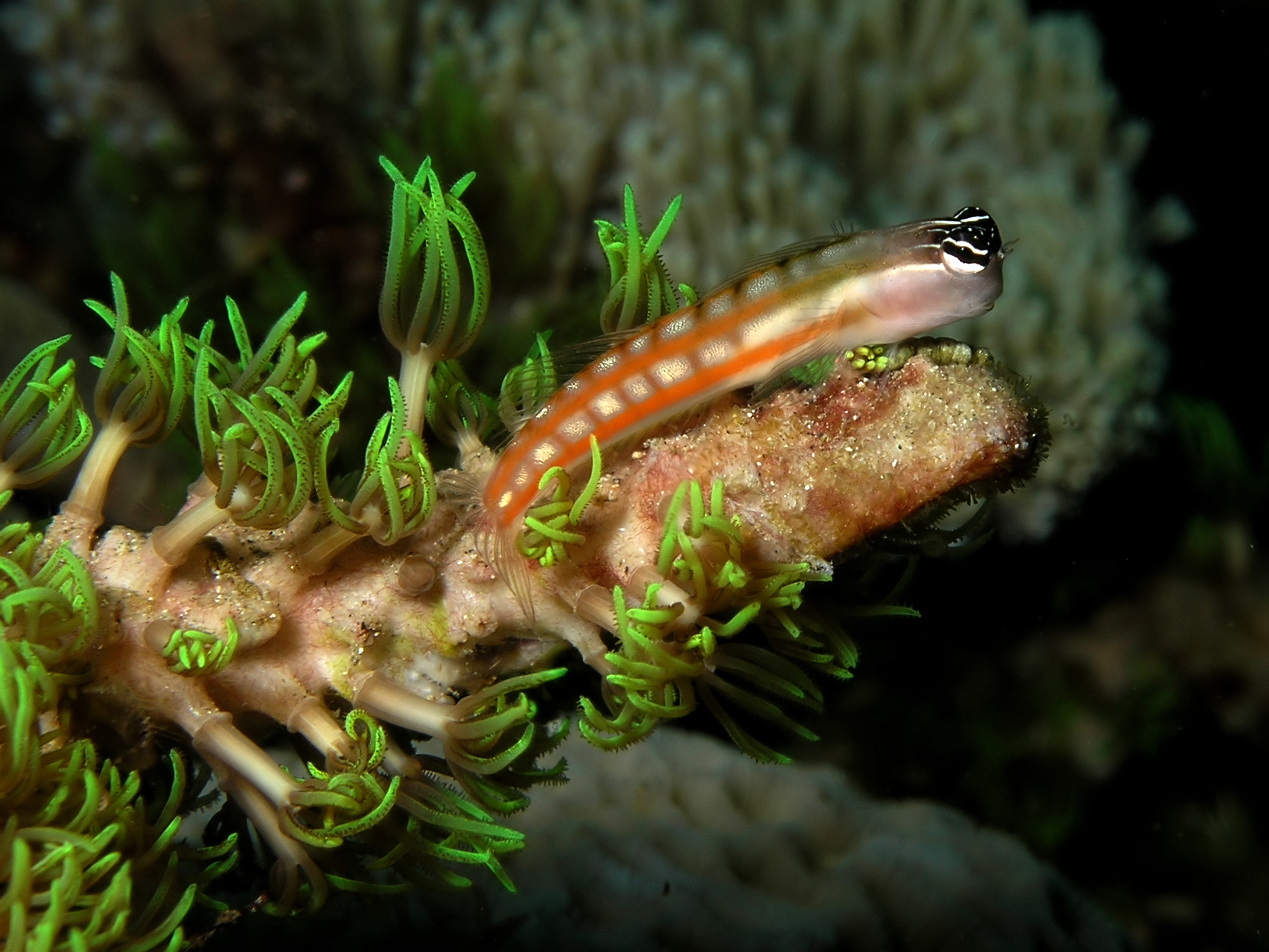
Australian blenny

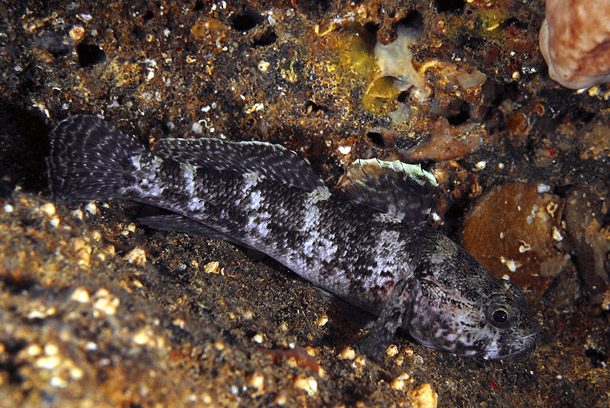
Rock goby

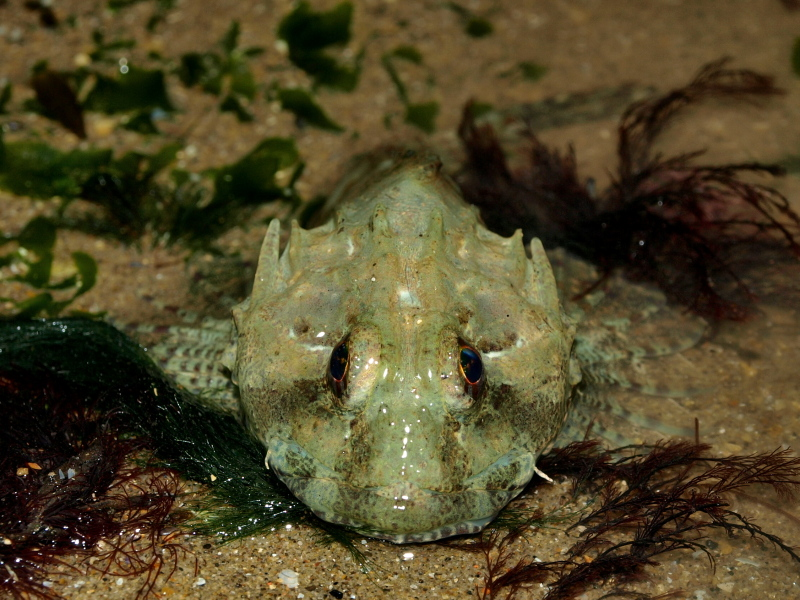
Long-spined sea scorpion

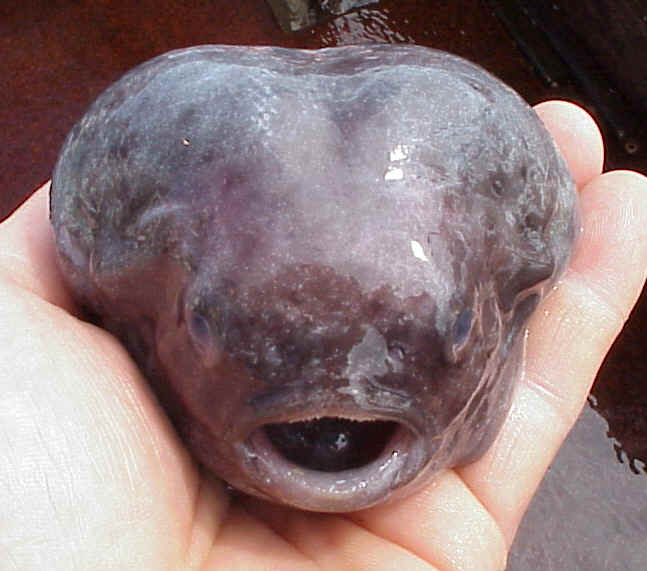
Smooth lumpsucker inflated in a defensive response
- The long-spined sea scorpion, a small stout fish which grows about 29 cm (11 in) long, is another temporary resident of rocky pools. They have large black eyes, a large mouth, and four long spines—two on each side on the gill cover—that stick out when the fish is removed from the water. They also have an organ like a finger on each side of their mouths which helps them catch prey. Because of their broad heads, they are also called "bullheads". They have a variety of effective camouflaged colours ranging from shades of browns with cream blotches, to orange and red with white blotches. They can also change their body colour to match their surroundings. They are found around the coasts of Northern Europe in shallow rocky waters hiding amongst seaweed. They are also found in rock pools and sometimes in waters 30 m (98 ft)deep. Long-spined sea scorpions lay eggs amongst seaweed or attached to rock crevices. The young hatch after two or three weeks, and go through several development stages before maturing into adults.
- Lumpsuckers are found in temperate northern waters. They live on the seafloor, and are temporary residents of rocky pools in late winter and early spring when they spawn. The body of the lumpsucker is scaleless and covered with small lumps. They have a large sucking disc on their underside which they use to cling to surfaces. They are normally a blue to slate-grey colour, and are effectively camouflaged to look like stones. They are portly, nearly spherical, poor swimmers, reaching lengths up to 50 cm (20 in). After the female lumpsucker lays eggs, the male takes over, clamping itself to a rock where it guards the eggs. When they hatch, lumpsuckers look like tiny tadpoles. They remain in shallow water and rock pools, hiding amongst seaweed and rocks, until they grow up.

=== Estuarine fish ===
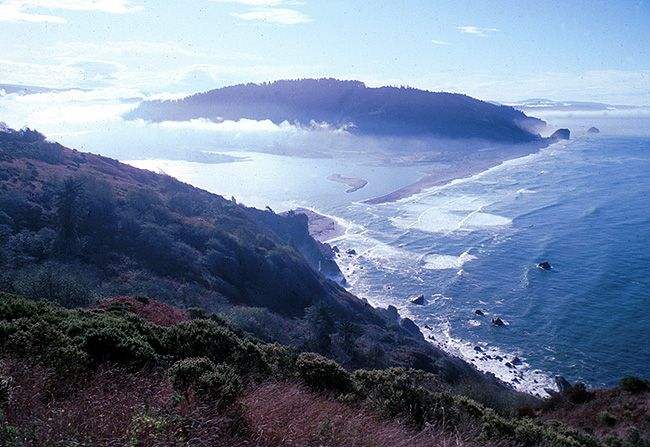
This estuary of the Klamath River is a transition zone between a freshwater river environment and a saltwater marine environment. Due to land runoff, river mouths and estuary waters can be turbid and nutrient rich, sometimes to the point of eutrophication.

Estuaries are partly enclosed coastal bodies of water with one or more rivers or streams flowing into them, and with a free connection to the open sea. These brackish water habitats form a transition zone between river environments and ocean environments, and ecological successions can form along the way. Estuaries are subject to both marine influences, such as tides, waves, and the influx of saline water; and riverine influences, such as flows of fresh water and sediment. The inflow of both seawater and freshwater provide high levels of nutrients in both the water column and sediment, making estuaries productive natural habitats.

Fishes that spend time in estuaries (or river mouths) need to be euryhaline (tolerant to a range of salinities). Estuaries provide an unstable environment for fish, where the salinity changes and the waters are often muddy and turbulent. In warmer climates, estuaries have mangroves around their edges. At times there may be only a few different fish species present in an estuary, but seasonal migrants, including eels, salmonids, and some forage fish such as herrings and sprats increase the diversity in the estuary.

River estuaries form important staging points during the migration of anadromous and catadromus fish species, such as salmon and eels, giving them time to form social groups and to adjust to the changes in salinity. Salmon are anadromous, meaning they live in the sea but ascend rivers to spawn; eels are catadromous, living in rivers and streams, but returning to the sea to breed. Besides the species that migrate through estuaries, there are many other fish that use them as "nursery grounds" for spawning or as places young fish can feed and grow before moving elsewhere. For example, herring and plaice are two commercially important species that use the Thames Estuary for this purpose.

Mangrove swamps are associated brackish water habitats. Many, though not all, mangrove swamps fringe estuaries and lagoons where the salinity changes with each tide. Among the most specialised residents of mangrove forests are mudskippers, fish that forage for food on land, and archer fish, perch-like fish that "spit" at insects and other small animals living in the trees, knocking them into the water where they can be eaten. Like estuaries, mangrove swamps are important breeding grounds for many fish, with species such as snappers, halfbeaks, and tarpon spawning or maturing among them.

=== Coral reef fish ===
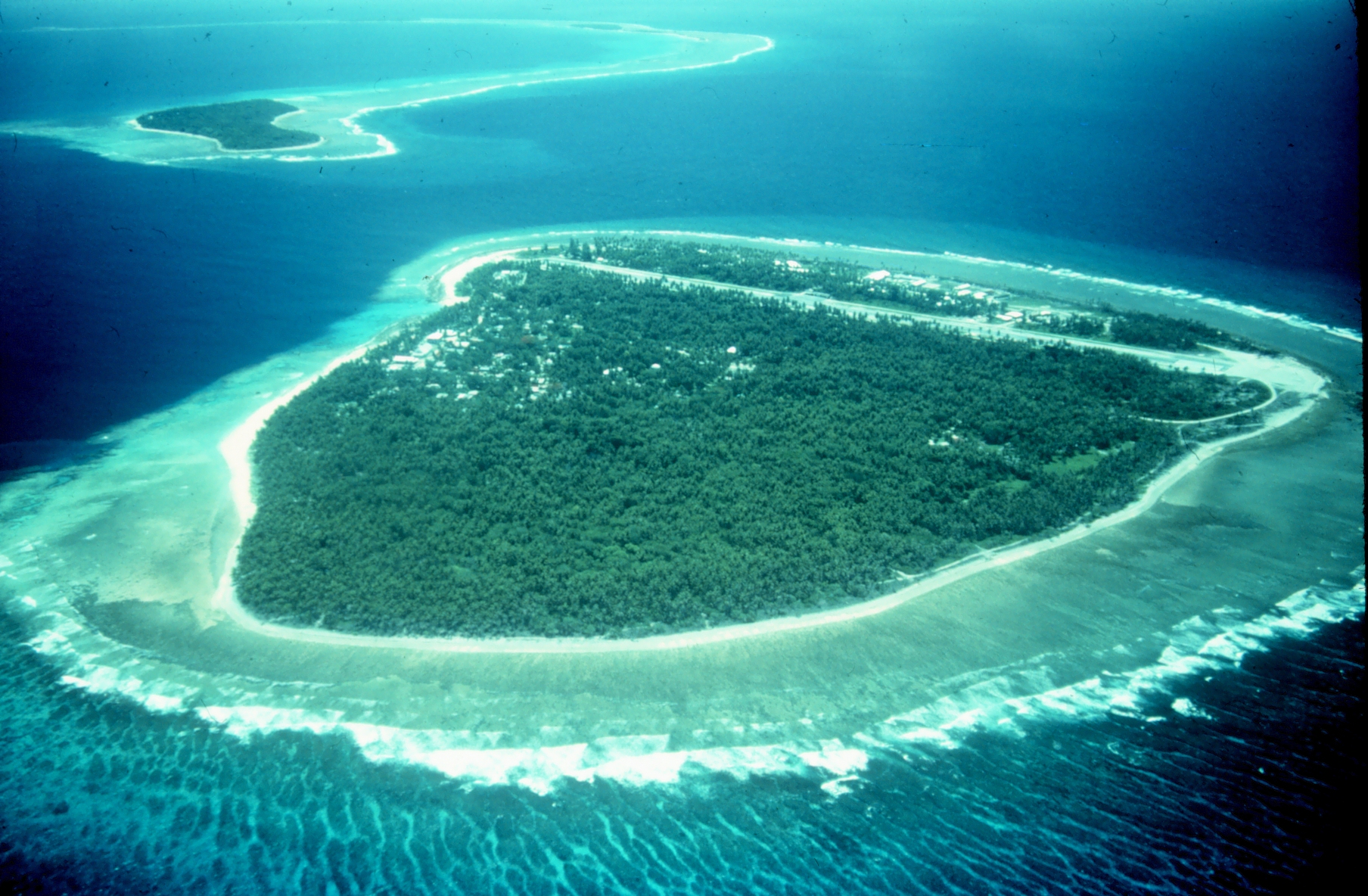
Coral reefs support flourishing ecosystems, paradoxically in clear, low nutrient waters, along tropical continental coasts and around volcanic islands. Coral reef fish are numerous and diverse.

In tropical waters, coral reef fish live amongst or in close relation to coral reefs. Coral reefs form complex ecosystems with tremendous biodiversity. Coral reef fish can be particularly colourful and interesting to watch. Hundreds of species can exist in a small area of a healthy reef, many of them hidden or well camouflaged. Reef fish have developed many ingenious specialisations adapted to survival on the reefs. Coral reefs occupy less than one per cent of the surface area of the world oceans, yet they provide a home for 25 per cent of all marine fish species.

Coral reefs often depend on other habitats in the surrounding area for the supply of nutrients, such as seagrass meadows and mangrove forests. Seagrass and mangroves supply dead plants and animals which are rich in nitrogen and also serve to feed fish and animals from the reef by supplying wood and vegetation. Reefs in turn protect mangroves and seagrass from waves and produce sediment for the mangroves and seagrass to root in.

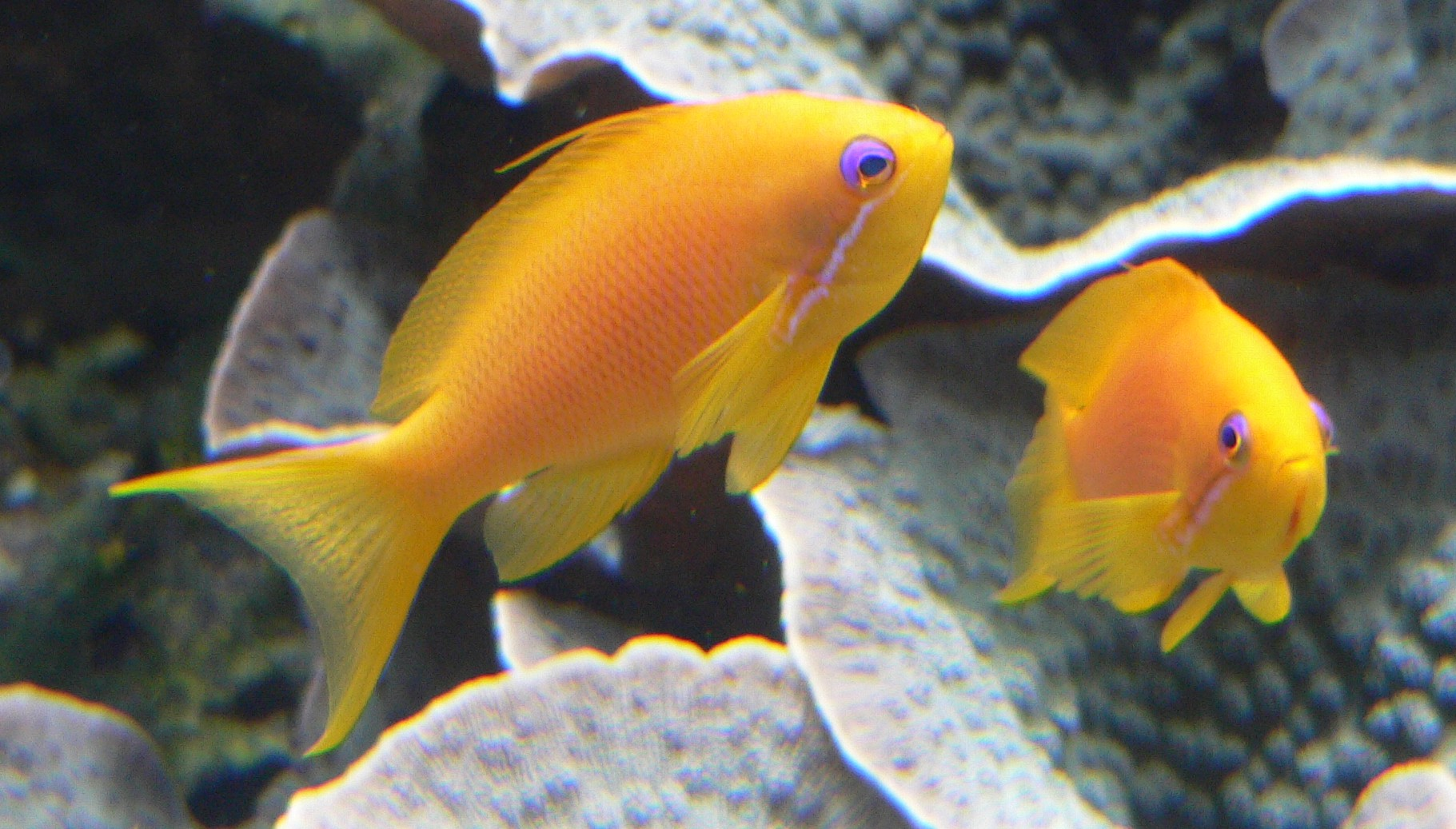
The sea goldie is an anthias. They are hermaphrodite, and swim in "harems".

Anthias are members of the family Serranidae and make up the subfamily Anthiinae. They are widespread in tropical waters. They have been called the "quintessential reef fish", and make up a sizeable portion of the colourful fishes seen swarming in coral reef photography. Anthias are mostly small, peaceful, beautiful and popular as ornamental fish. They are mainly zooplankton feeders. Anthias shoal and school in large numbers, operating more intimate "harems" within the schools. These harems contain a dominant and colourful male, between 2 and 12 females — who operate a hierarchy among themselves — and one or two "subdominant" males, often less brightly coloured and non-territorial. Within the swarm of females, territorial males perform acrobatic U-swim displays and vigorously defend an area of the reef and its associated harem. Anthias are protogynous hermaphrodites. All anthias are born female; if a dominant male perishes, the largest female of the group will often change into a male to take its place. This may lead to squabbling between the next largest male and the transforming female, whose hormones are now surging with testosterone. This can turn quite vicious in the limited confines of captivity.

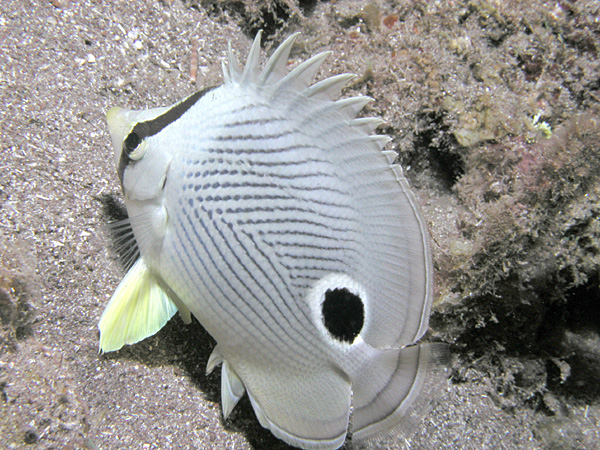
The foureye butterflyfish has a false eyespot on its sides, which can confuse prey and predators

Butterflyfish are group of about 120 species belonging to the family Chaetodontidaeof Perchiformes. They include bannerfish and coralfish. They are widespread on coral reefs. Butterflyfish are mostly between 12 and 22 centimetres (4.7 and 8.7 in) in length. The largest species, the lined butterflyfish and saddle butterflyfish, grow to 30 centimetres (12 in). Many species are brightly coloured and strikingly patterned, though other species are dull in colour. Many have eyespots on their flanks and dark bands across their eyes, not unlike the patterns seen on butterfly wings. Their deep, laterally narrow bodies are easily noticed through the profusion of reef life. The conspicuous colouration of butterflyfish may be intended for interspecies communication. Butterflyfish have uninterrupted dorsal fins with tail fins that may be rounded or truncated, but are never forked. Generally diurnal and frequenting waters of less than 18 metres (59 ft) (though some species descend to 180 metres (590 ft)), butterflyfish stick to particular home ranges. The corallivores are especially territorial, forming mated pairs and staking claim to a specific coral head. Contrastingly, the zooplankton feeders form large conspecific groups. By night butterflyfish hide in reef crevices and exhibit markedly different colouration. Their colouration also makes butterflyfish popular aquarium fish. However, most species feed on coral polyps and sea anemones, which can result in problems for the hobby aquarists.

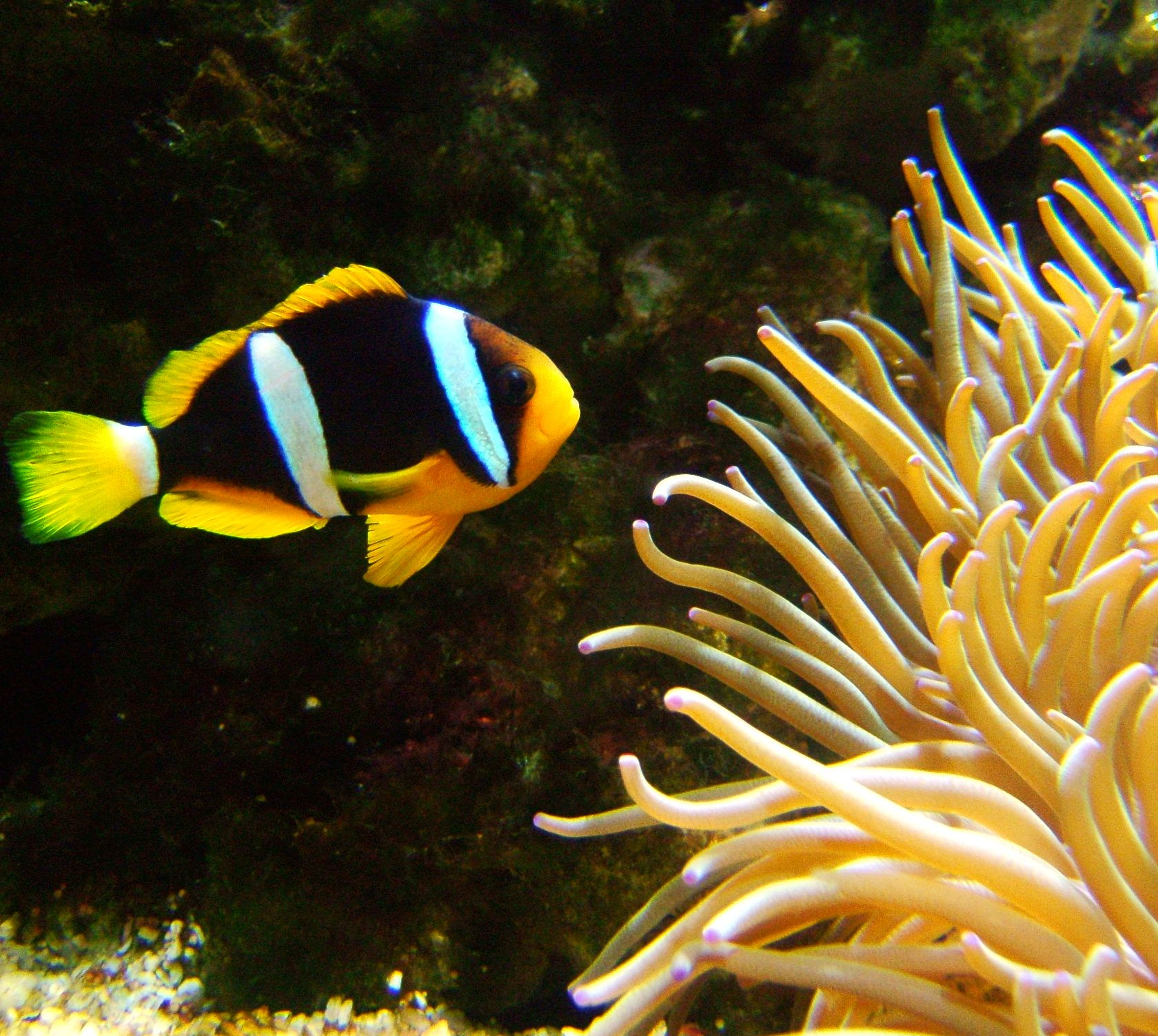

Clownfish, anemonefish and damselfish are among about 360 species classified in the family Pomacentridae. Most Pomacentrids are associated with coral reefs in the Indo-West Pacific, with a few species occurring in temperate waters. Some species are native to freshwater or brackish estuarine environments. Most live in shallow water, from 2 to 15 meters (6.6 to 49.2 ft), although some species are found below 100 m (330 ft). Most species are specialists, living in specific parts of the reef, such as sandy lagoons, steep reef slopes, or areas exposed to strong wave action. In general, the coral is used as shelter, and many species can only survive in its presence. The bottom-dwelling species are territorial, occupying and defending a portion of the reef, often centred around an area of shelter. By keeping away other species of fish, some pomacentrids encourage the growth of thick mats of algae within their territories, leading to the common name farmerfish. Different species display a wide range of colours, although some are relatively drab. Pomacentrids are omnivorous or herbivorous, feeding off algae, plankton, and small bottom-dwelling crustaceans. A small number eat coral.

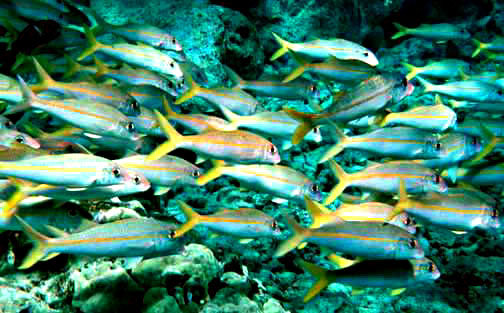
The yellowfin goatfish changes its colour so it can school with blue-striped snappers

Goatfishes are a family Mullidae of about 55 species of perciform fishes, associated worldwide with tropical reefs. They are typically about 20 cm long, though the dash-and-dot goatfish, grows to 55 cm. Goatfish are tireless benthic feeders, possess a pair of long chemosensory barbels ("whiskers") protruding from their chins resembling a goat's beard. They use these to rifle through the sediments in search of a meal. Like goats, they seek anything edible; worms, crustaceans, molluscs and other small invertebrates are staples. Many species of goatfish are conspicuously coloured and have the ability to change their colouration depending on their current activity. By day, many form large inactive (non-feeding) schools: these aggregates may contain both conspecifics and heterospecifics. For example, the yellowfin goatfish school with blue-striped snappers. When they do that, the yellowfins changes its colouration to match that of the snapper. By night the schools disperse and individual goatfish head their separate ways to loot the sands. The diurnal goldsaddle goatfish changes from a lemon-yellow to a pale cream when feeding. Other nocturnal feeders will shadow the active goatfish, waiting patiently for overlooked morsels. Goatfish stay within the shallows, going no deeper than about 110 metres. Most species do not tolerate brackish water, so they do not enter estuaries or the mouths of rivers.

=== Other nearshore fish ===
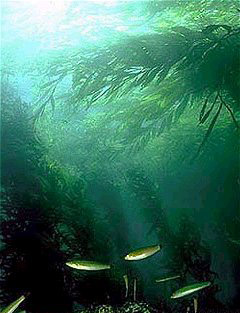
Kelp forests can provide shelter and food for shallow water fish

Other nearshore or shallow water fish live near the shore in depths of less than 10 metres. They occupy the areas over sandy or rocky bottoms, and can be associated with seagrass meadows and kelp forests. They can be divided into demersal fish and pelagic fish. Demersal fish live on or near the sea floor, while pelagic fish live in the water column away the sea floor.

Examples of such shallow water demersal fish, found in both tropical and temperate waters around the world, are seahorses, triplefins, wrasse and flounder. As demersal fish, all these fish spend most of their time on or near the sea floor.

- Flatfish are superbly adapted groundfish, found on muddy and sandy sea floors. In many species both eyes lie on one side of the head, one or the other migrating through and around the head during development. Some species face their "left" side upward, some face their "right" side upward, and others face either side upward. Some flatfish can camouflage themselves on the ocean floor.
- Wrasse are a large family of mainly small fish, usually less than 20 centimetres (7.9 in) long. Most wrasse are loners that prefer habitats such as coral reefs and rocky shores. They live close to the substrate, eating small invertebrates and almost anything else that lurks on the bottom. Many are brightly coloured. They have thick lips and use their sharp teeth to pick small creatures off the rocks. Many smaller wrasses follow the feeding trails of larger fish, picking up invertebrates disturbed by their passing.
- Triplefins are a family of fish. They are usually found around coral reefs and rocks, usually in shallow, clear sunlit waters such as lagoons and seaward reefs. Triplefins have three dorsal fins (hence the name). They are small fish, usually less than six cm long. Brightly coloured, often for reasons of camouflage, they are nervous and retreat to rock crevices at any perceived threat.
- Seahorses are a genus of fish. They prefer sheltered harbours, estuaries and other shallow coastal waters, where they hunt tiny crustaceans. They bob around in sheltered areas such as coral reefs, mangrove stands and seagrass meadows and estuaries. They are camouflaged with murky patterns that blend into kelp and sea grass backgrounds. During social moments or in unusual surroundings, seahorses can turn on bright colours.
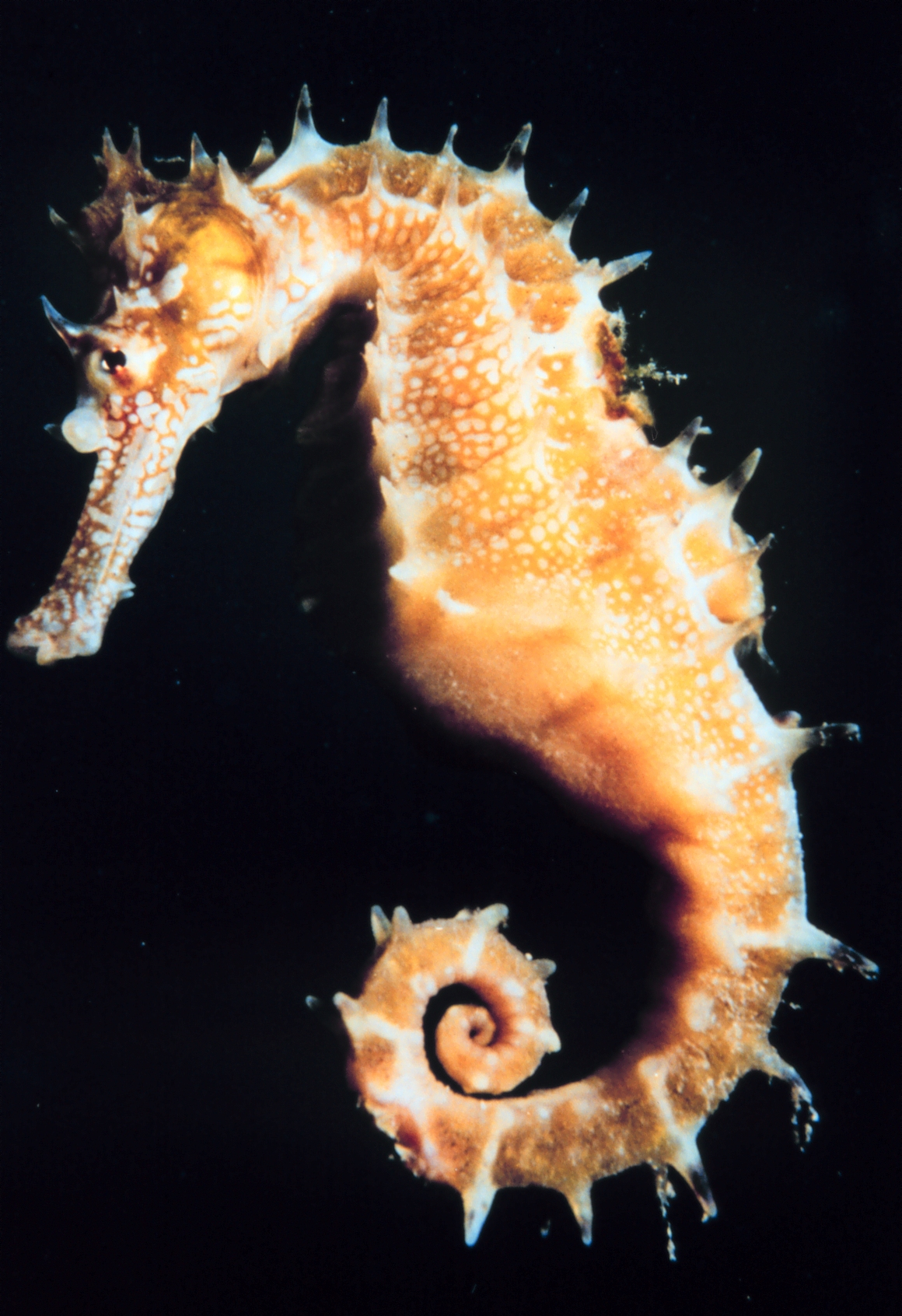
Seahorse

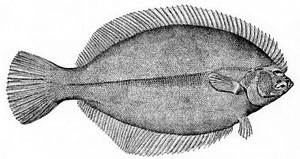
Flatfish

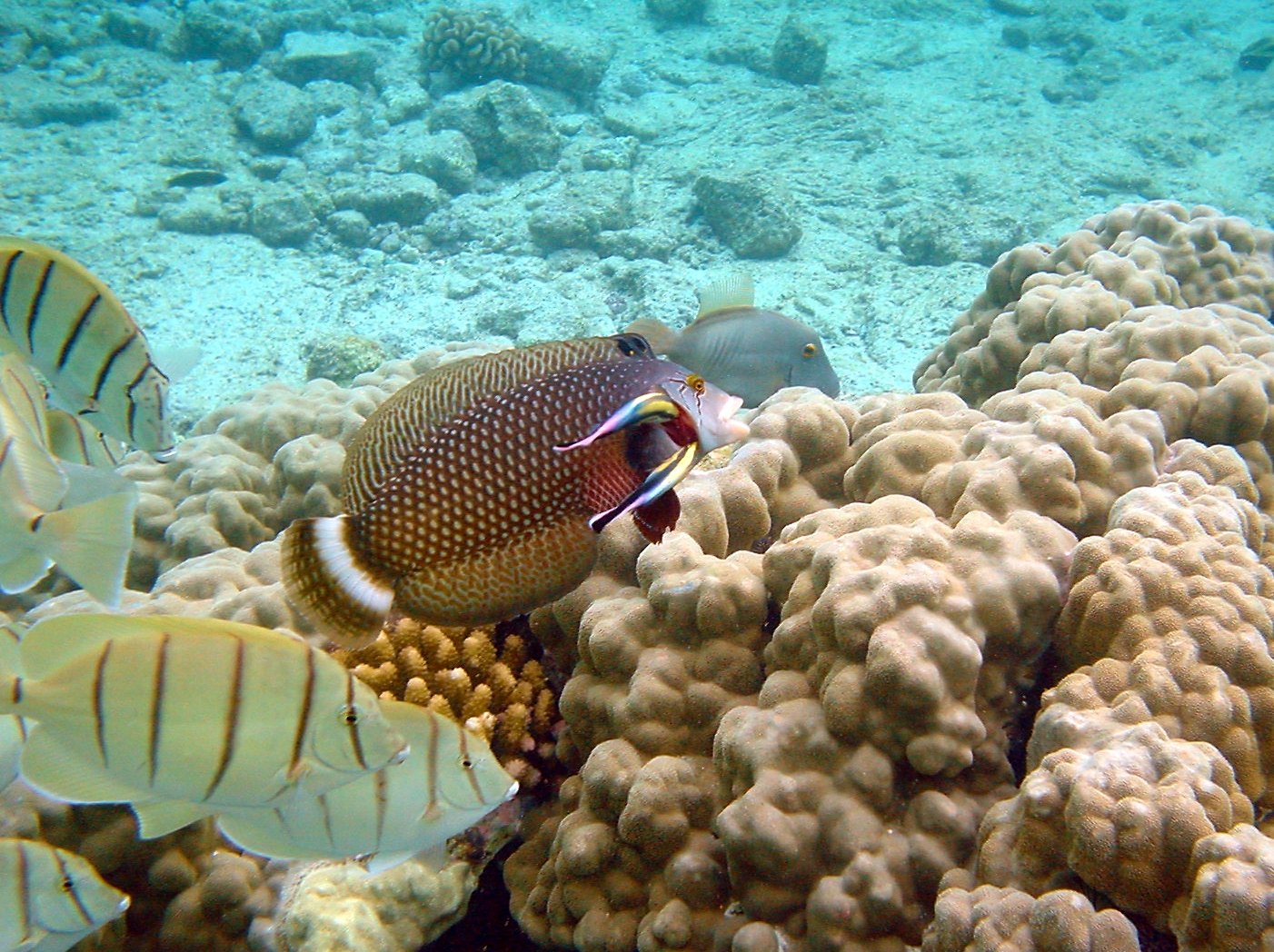
Cleaner wrasses working on a dragon wrasse

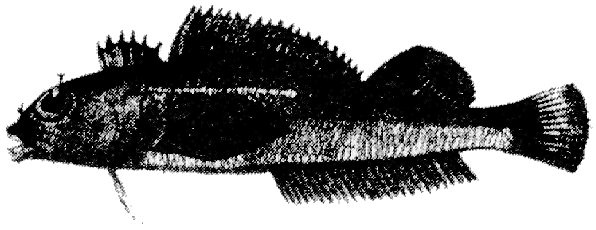
Common triplefin

Examples of shallow water pelagic fish, found in both tropical and temperate waters around the world, are grey mullet, sprats and garfish. As pelagic fish, all these fish spend most of their time living in the water column away the sea floor.

- The grey mullet are medium size fish, typically about 50 cm (20 in) long. They are often caught with seine nets.
- The garfish is a long, slender fish, looking like a spear, which feeds on seagrass fragments, shrimps and crab larvae. In turn it is preyed on by larger fish and, since it is often near the surface, cormorants and gannets.
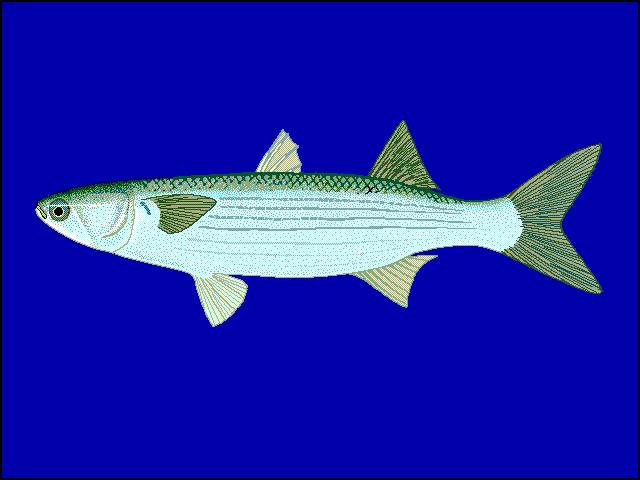
Grey mullet

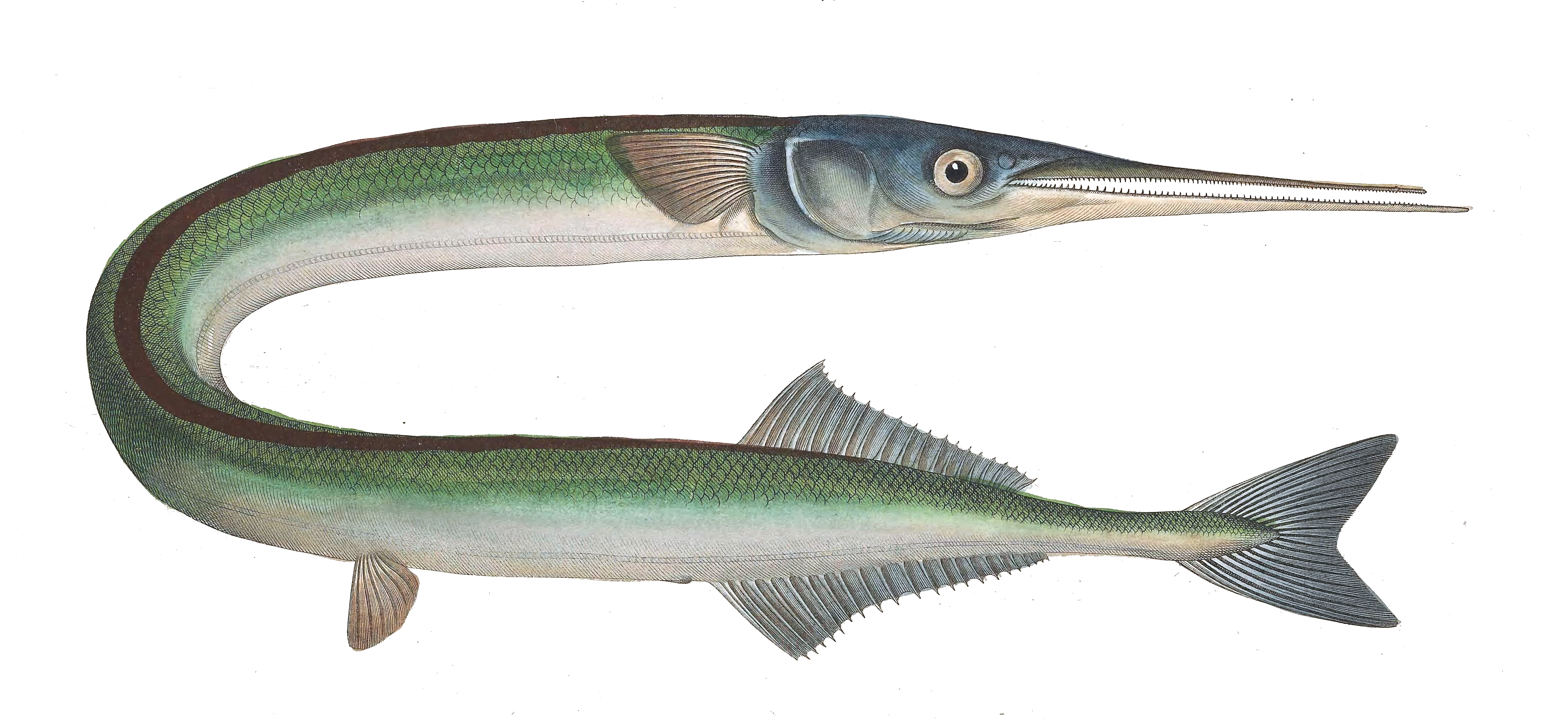
Garfish

== Coastal pelagic fish ==
=== Plankton feeding ===
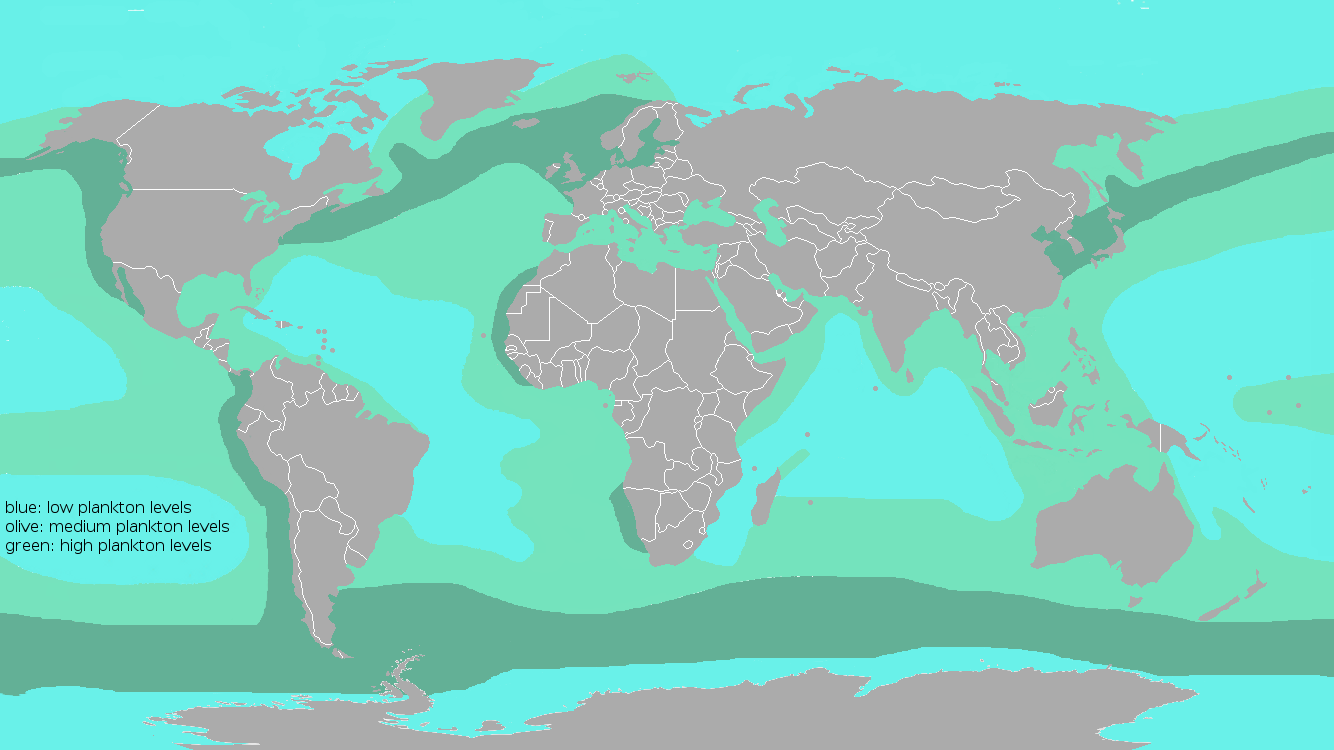
World distribution of plankton

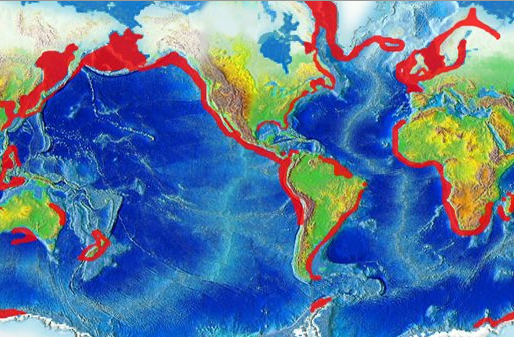
Areas of upwelling in red

At the base of food chains are the primary producers. In the ocean these primary producers are mainly a type of plankton, microscopic phytoplankton which drift in the water column. Phytoplankton need sunlight for photosynthesis to power carbon fixation, so they are mainly located in sunlit surface waters. Phytoplankton also need and rapidly use nutrients in the water column. The phytoplankton are eaten by zooplankton, which in turn are eaten by predatory zooplankton. Filter feeders then eat the plankton and larger predatory fish eat the filter feeders (see diagram at the right).

Most filter-feeding pelagic fish found in coastal waters are small, silvery forage fish. Forage fish include fishes of the family Clupeidae (herrings, shad, sardines and pilchards, hilsa, menhaden and sprats), as well as anchovies, capelin and halfbeaks. They use schooling strategies to avoid predators, and different schools of forage fish often associate with each other in open coastal waters. Forage fish feed near the base of the food chain on plankton and fry (recently hatched fish), often by filter feeding. In turn, they are preyed on by larger predatory fish, seabirds and marine mammals.

Worldwide, there are five major coastal currents associated with upwelling areas: the Canary Current (off Northwest Africa), the Benguela Current (off southern Africa), the California Current (off California and Oregon), the Humboldt Current (off Peru and Chile), and the Somali Current (off Western India). All of these currents support major fisheries. Many forage fish are important commercial species, and the schools can be targeted by spotter planes. The fish are caught by purse seiners—fishing boats that use nets to enclose the fish—and can be overfished.

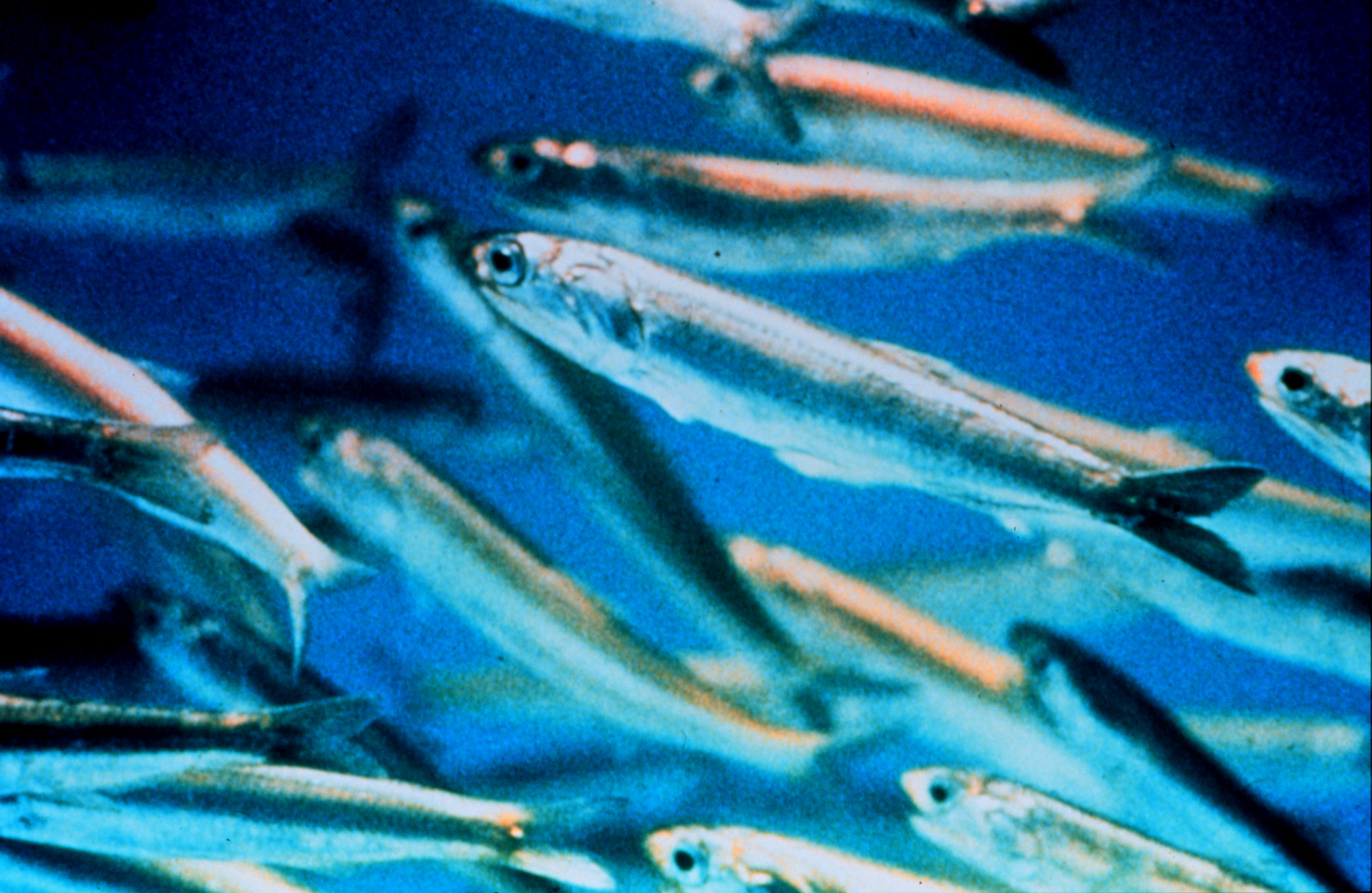
Schooling anchovies

European sprat

Atlantic herring

Underwater video loop of a school of herrings migrating to their spawning grounds in the Baltic Sea

=== Predatory ===
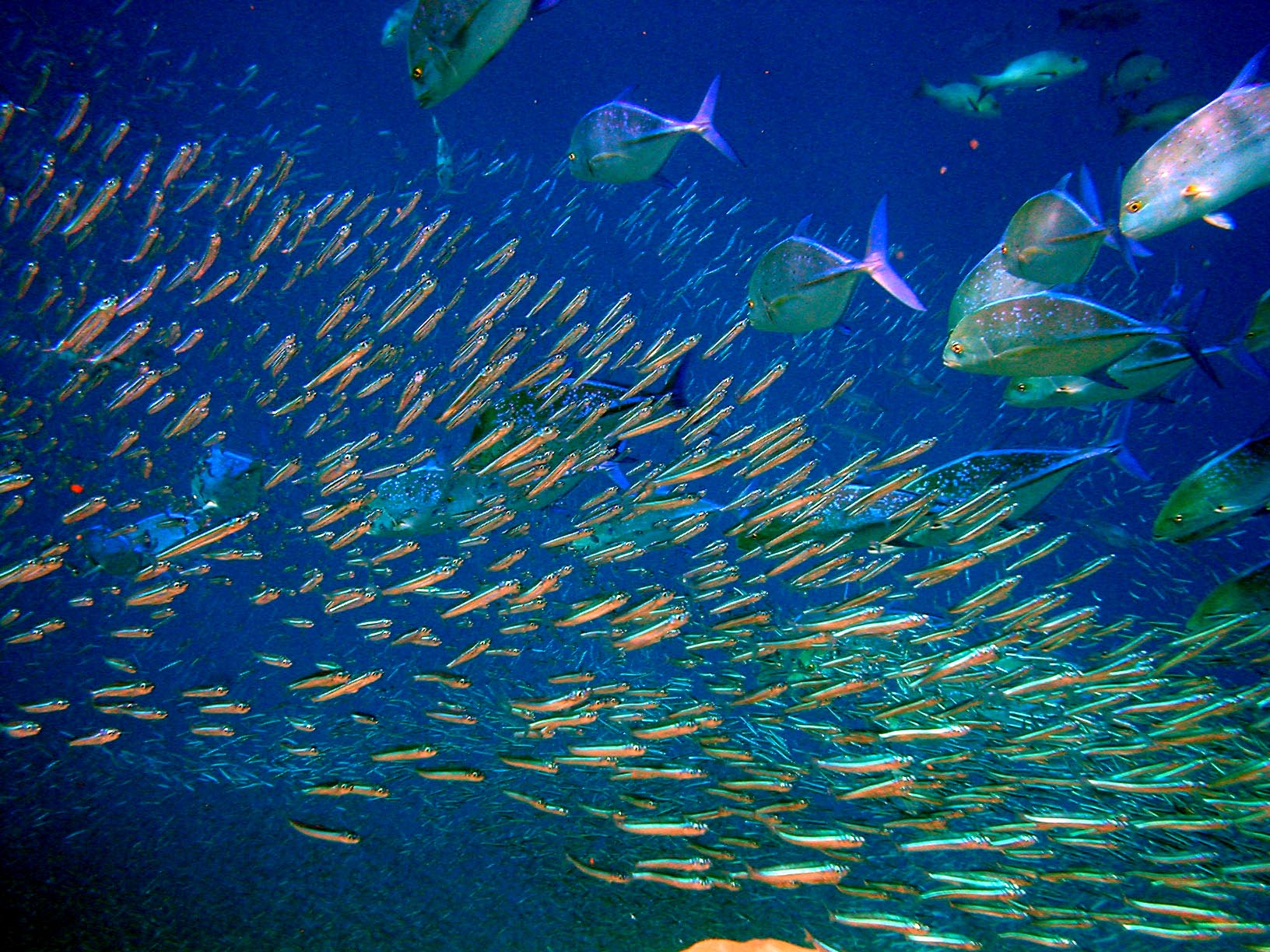
Predator bluefin trevally sizing up schooling anchovies

Predatory pelagic fishes found on continental shelves worldwide in both tropical and temperate waters include porgies, barracuda, amberjacks and cutlassfishes. They tend to be larger fish, and are carnivorous, feeding on the smaller, silvery forage fish that eat plankton (see section above). Some species also feed on crabs and other invertebrates, foraged from the sea floor.

- Mackerel scom*
- Porgies sometimes called sea breams, are any of about 100 species belonging to the family Sparidae. Porgies usually have high backs and a single dorsal fin, like snapper or grunt fishes (grunts are named for the sound they make grinding their teeth). They are bottom feeding pelagic fishes, with small mouths equipped with strong teeth adapted for handling small fishes and invertebrates with hard shells. Most do not exceed a size of about 30 cm (12 in), but some may grow to four times that length. They often school, and will migrate between reefs. Larger fish enter estuaries and harbours.
- Barracuda have long slender bodies typically about 50 cm (20 in) long. They have a wicked set of teeth and are ferocious predators. They feed on crustaceans, cephalopods and small fish like anchovy and pilchard. Barracouta often hunt in schools near the bottom or midwater, and sometimes even near the surface at night.
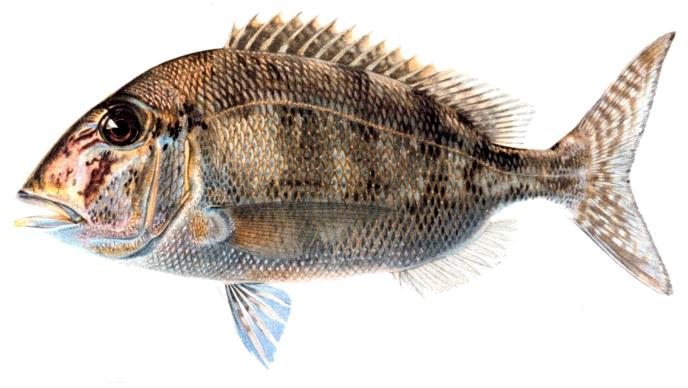
The jolthead porgy is a porgi grunt

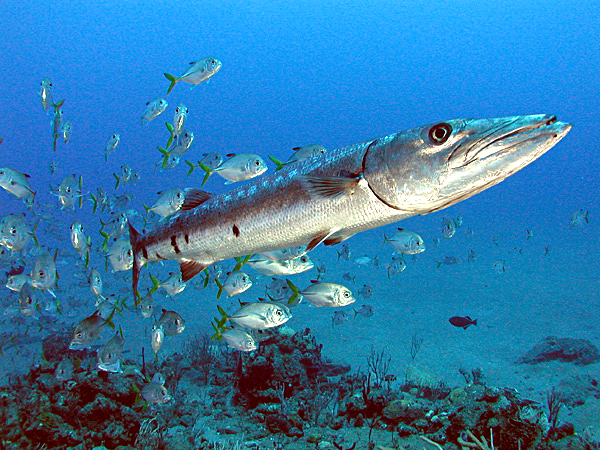
Great barracuda and jacks

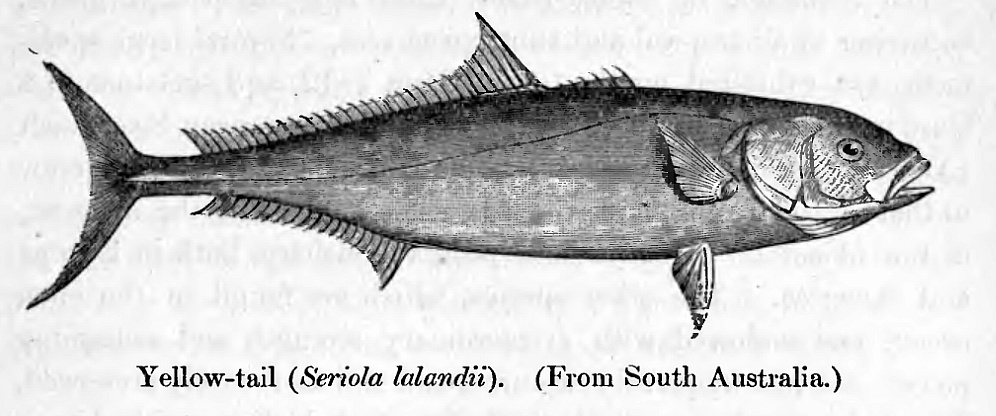
The yellowtail amberjack, pound for pound, is one of the hardest fighting fish in the ocean.

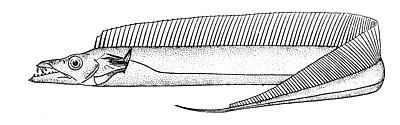
The largehead hairtail is a cutlassfish

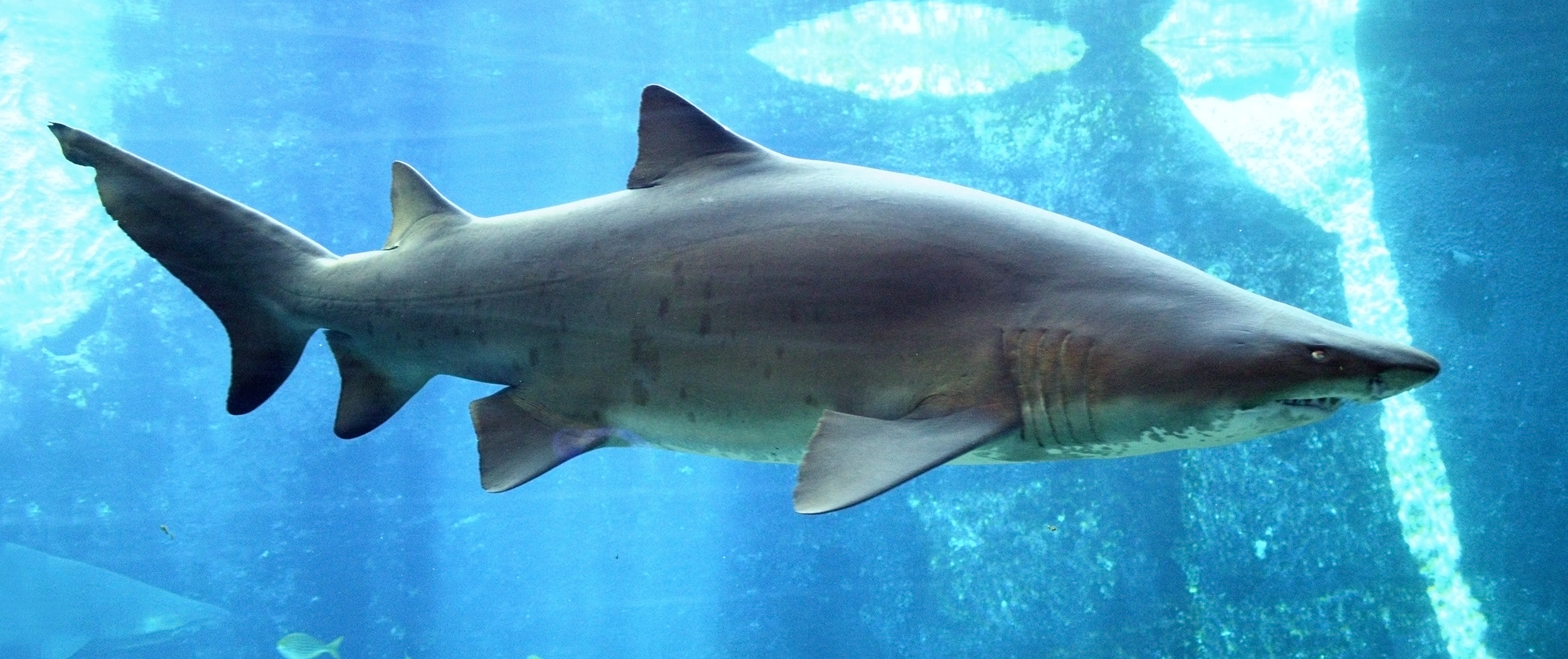
The sand tiger shark is a large coastal shark that inhabits coastal waters worldwide. Its numbers are declining, and it is now listed as a vulnerable species on the IUCN Red List.

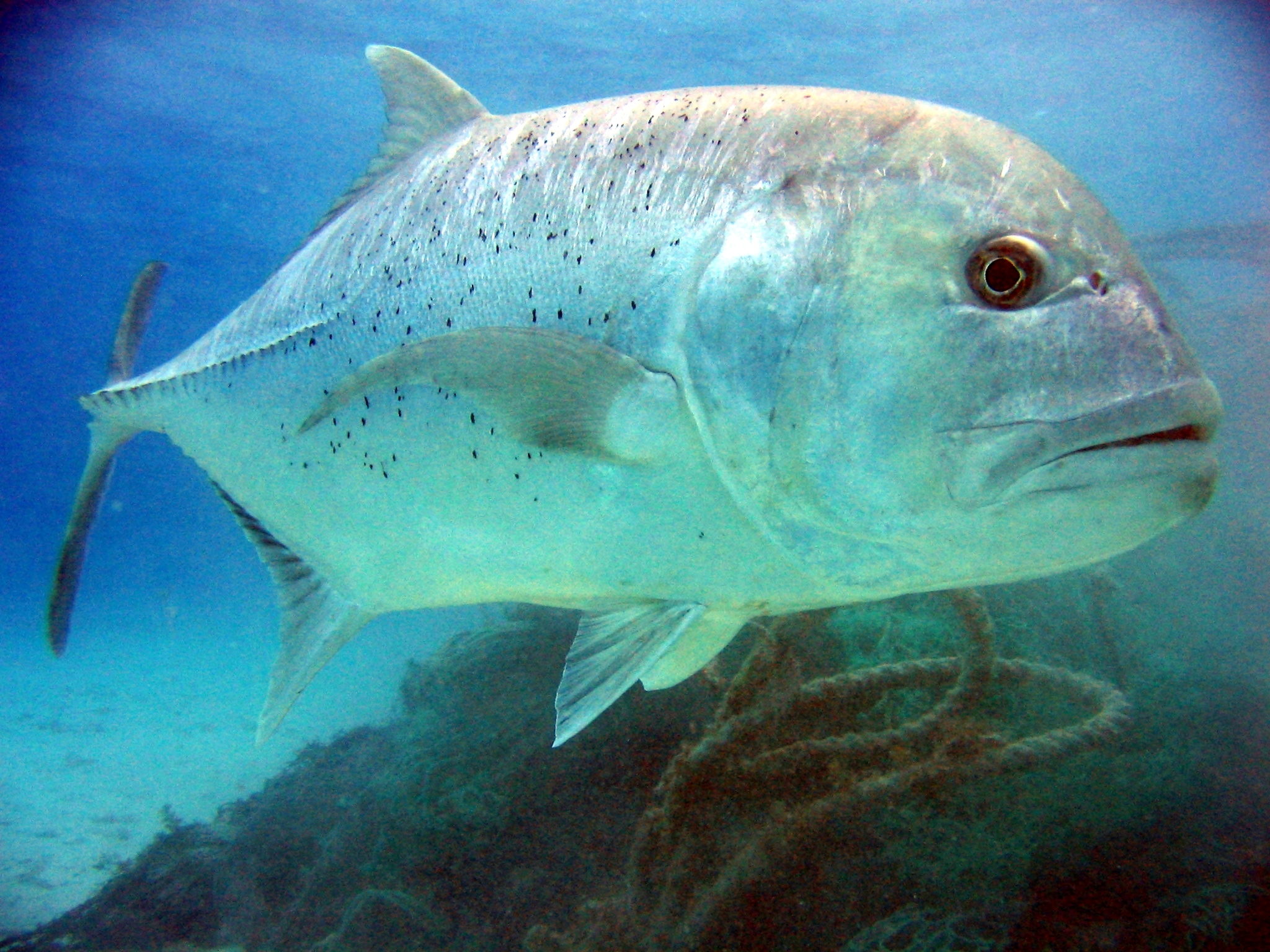
Giant trevally are great gamefish found in Indo-Pacific tropical waters. They are powerful apex predators in most of their habitats, hunting both individually and in schools.

- Cutlassfishes are a group of about 40 species belonging to the family Trichiuridae. They are ocean fish which regularly stray into coastal waters around the world. Fish of this family are long, slender, and generally steely blue or silver in colour, giving rise to their name. They have reduced or absent pelvic and caudal fins, giving them an eel-like appearance, and large fang-like teeth.
- Jacks, amberjacks, pompanos, horse mackerel, scads, leatherjackets and trevally are fish of the family Carangidae. Found in most coastal waters, they are fast predatory fishes that hunt in the waters above reefs and in the open sea; some dig in the sea floor for invertebrates (some can also filter feed, such as the white trevally). The largest fish in the family, the giant trevally, grows up to 1.7 m in length; most fish in the family reach a maximum length of 25–100 cm. The family contains many important commercial and game fish, notably the Pacific jack mackerel and the other jack mackerels in the genus Trachurus. The type species of this genus is the Atlantic horse mackerel. Jack mackerels are an important inshore commercial species.
  - Amberjacks are a group of nine species belonging to the genus Seriola within the family Carangidae. Mainly open water fish, they can follow small forage fish into estuaries and enclosed waters, where they will also hunt for crustaceans. Amberjacks are fast swimming and aggressive predators that often hunt in schools around offshore reefs. The yellowtail amberjack can reach 1.8 m in length and weigh 60 kilograms.

== Demersal pelagic fish ==
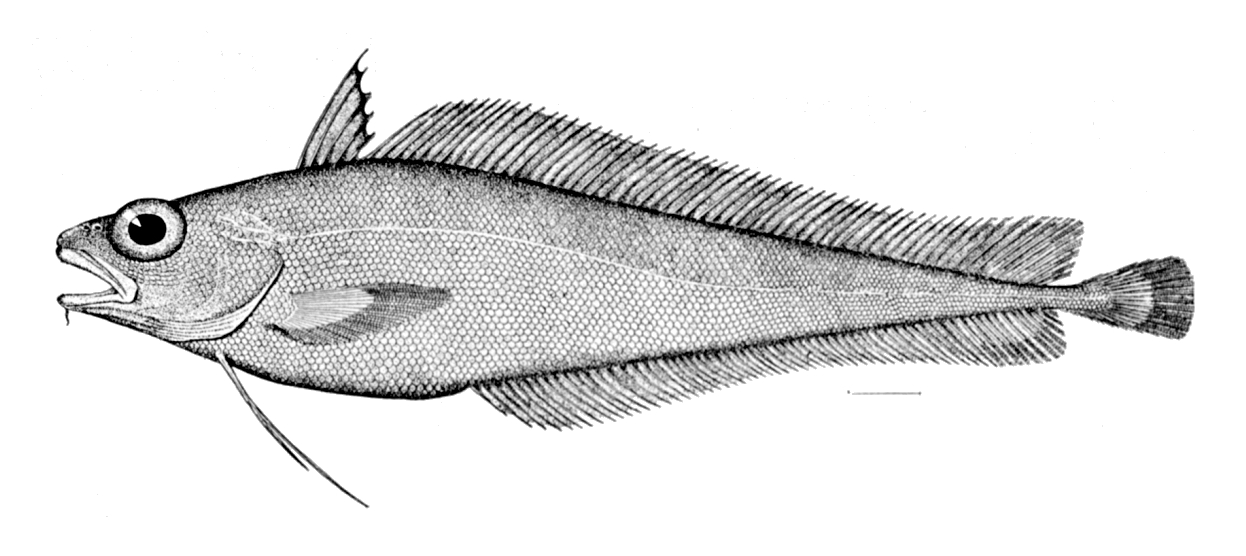
Cod-like fishes, like this morid cod have a barbel (fleshy filament) on their lower jaw which they use to detect prey buried in the sand or mud.

Fish that live on or in close association with the sea floor are called demersal fish. This section discusses the coastal demersal fish that live on the continental shelf, but are living further from the coast and in deeper water than the nearshore fish discussed above.

Demersal fish are white fish. Unlike oily fish, white fish contain oils only in their liver, rather than in the gut, and can therefore be gutted as soon as they are caught, on board the ship. White fish has dry and white flesh. They can be divided into benthopelagic fish (mostly "round" fish) which live near the sea bed, such as cod, and benthic fish (flatfish) such as plaice which live on the sea bed. Benthic fish tend to be "flat", so they can lie on the bottom.

- Cod-like fishes are a number of round benthopelagic species belonging to the order Gadiformes, such as Atlantic and Pacific cod, morid cod, haddock and pollock, including the highly commercial Alaska pollock. Cod-like fishes are often found in large schools over sandy or muddy bottoms. They have a barbel (fleshy filament) on their lower jaw which they use to detect prey buried in the sand or mud. Some migrate to warm water in winter to spawn.
- John Dory are fishes of the genus Zeus. They have a widespread distribution and are typically found near the seabed in depths from 5 meters (16 feet). The John Dory grows to a maximum length of 65 cm (2.13 ft). Although it is a benthopelagic fish, its body is flat and it can hardly be seen from the front because it is so thin. It is a poor swimmer with long spines on the dorsal fin. It has a large dark eyespot on the side of its body which is used to confuse prey, which are scooped up in its big mouth. Large eyes at the front of the head provide it with bifocal vision and depth perception, which are important for predators. The John Dory usually gets its food by stalking it then shooting out a tube in its mouth to capture its prey. It eats forage fish, and occasionally squid and cuttlefish. In turn, they are preyed on by sharks, like the dusky shark, and other large bony fish. They are normally solitary.
- Turbot and brill are benthic flatfish, resembling flounder and sole, but found in deeper offshore waters on the continental shelf. They are brownish-green, with dark blotches on the turbot and mottling on the brill. They are fished by coastal trawlers.
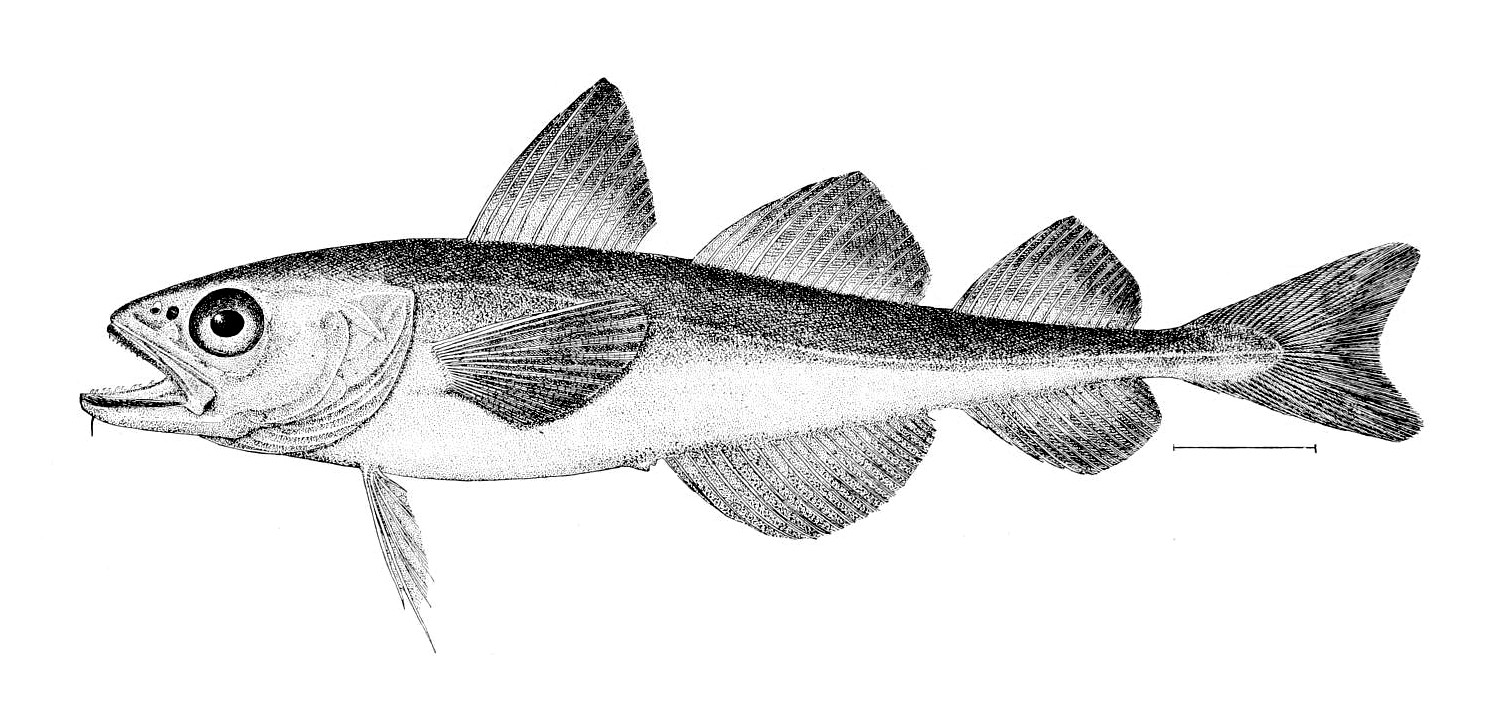
The polar cod is found further north than any other fish species. It frequents river mouths and feeds on plankton and krill. It is preyed on by narwhals, belugas, ringed seals and seabirds.

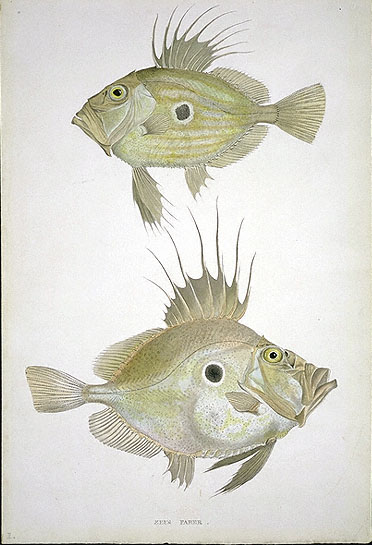
The John Dory is so thin it can hardly be seen from the front. The large eyespot on the side of its body confuses its prey.

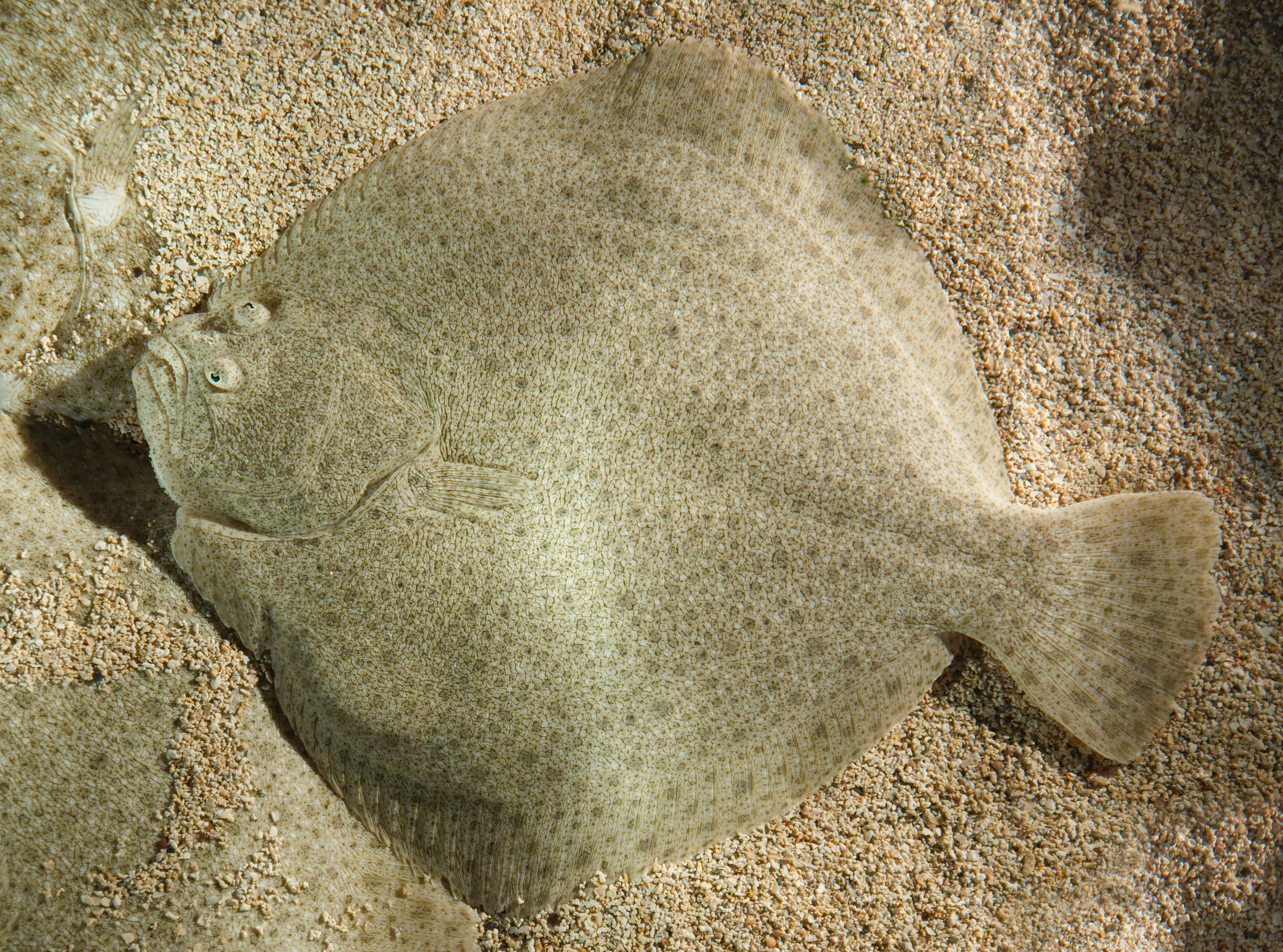
The turbot is a large left-eyed flatfish usually found not too far from shore in sandy shallow waters. It is a prized food fish.

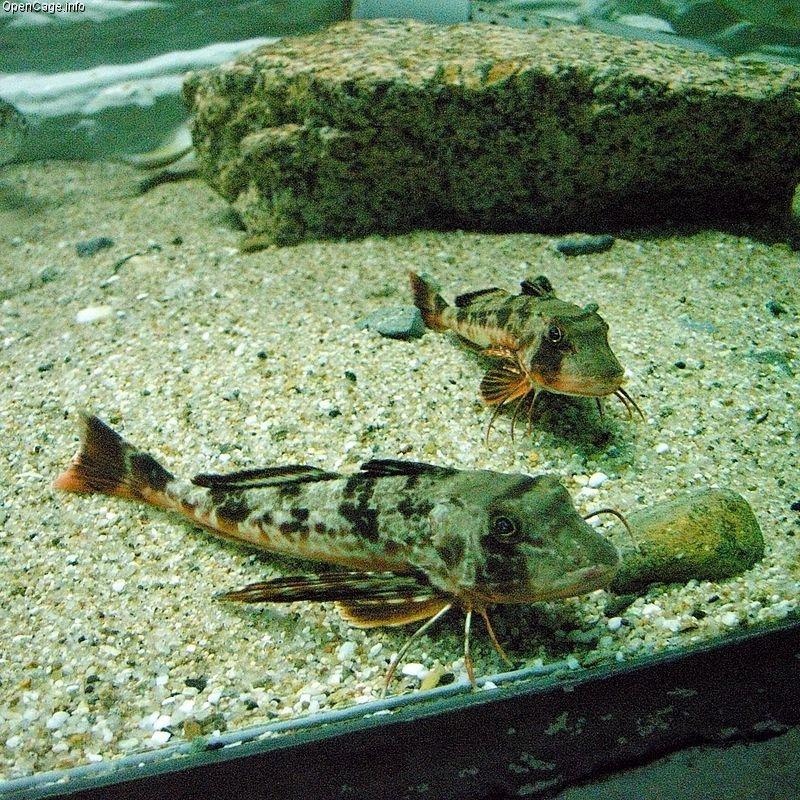
The red gurnard is a mail-cheeked fish found to depths of around 180 metres. They often grunt when captured as air is expelled from its air bladder.
- Mail-cheeked fishes belong to a group of about 30 species in the order Scorpaeniformes. Mail-cheeked fishes are named after a plate of bone that runs across each cheek. They are widespread in all the oceans of the world. Mail-cheeked fishes are carnivorous, mostly feeding on crustaceans, such as crabs and shrimp, and on smaller fish. Most species live on the sea bottom in relatively shallow waters, although species are known from mid and deep water, from the mid-water, and even from fresh water. They typically have spiny heads, and rounded pectoral and caudal fins. Most species are less than 30 centimetres (12 in) in length, but the full size range of the order varies from the velvetfishes, which can be just 2 centimetres (0.79 in) long as adults, to the Lingcod, which can reach 150 centimetres (4.9 ft) in length.
  - Red gurnard are mail-cheeked fish. They use their large pectoral fins to rest on the bottom and to detect food.

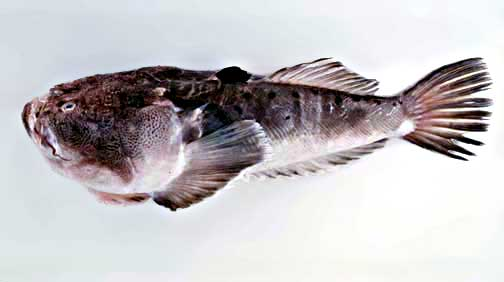
The stargazer is an ambush predator which can deliver both venom and electric shocks. It has been called "the meanest thing in creation".

Stargazers are about 50 species of fishes, belonging to the family Uranoscopidae, and found worldwide in shallow waters. Stargazers are venomous; they have two large poison spines situated behind the opercle and above the pectoral fins. They can also deliver electric shocks. They are ambush predators with eyes on top of their heads (thus the name). Stargazers also have a large upward-facing mouth in a large head. They bury themselves in sand with only their eyes showing, and leap upwards to ambush fish and invertebrates overhead. Some species have a worm-shaped lure growing out of the floor of the mouth, which they wiggle to attract prey's attention. Lengths range from 18 cm up to 90 cm, for the giant stargazer Kathetostoma giganteum. Stargazers are a delicacy in some cultures. The venom is destroyed when it is cooked, and stargazers are sold in some fish markets with their electric organ removed. They have been called "the meanest things in creation" and the "worst pet on earth".

- Sandperches are a family, Pinguipedidae, containing 63 species of fishes in the order Perciformes. They are benthic carnivores, feeding on small fish and invertebrates. Examples are the redbanded weever, yellow weaver and blue cod. They are often caught in pots like crayfish.
- Medusa fishes are a family Centrolophidae of 31 species of perciform fishes. They are found in temperate and tropical waters throughout the world, usually feeding on fish, crustaceans and small squid near rough sea floors on continental shelf and slope. Examples are barrelfish, southern driftfish, imperial blackfish, the Japanese and pelagic butterfish, the New Zealand and Tasmanian ruffe, and the common, silver and white warehou. The young of some species associate with jellyfish, which provides them with protection from predators and opportunities to scavenge the remains of the jellyfish's meals. The young of other species associate with large masses of floating kelp.
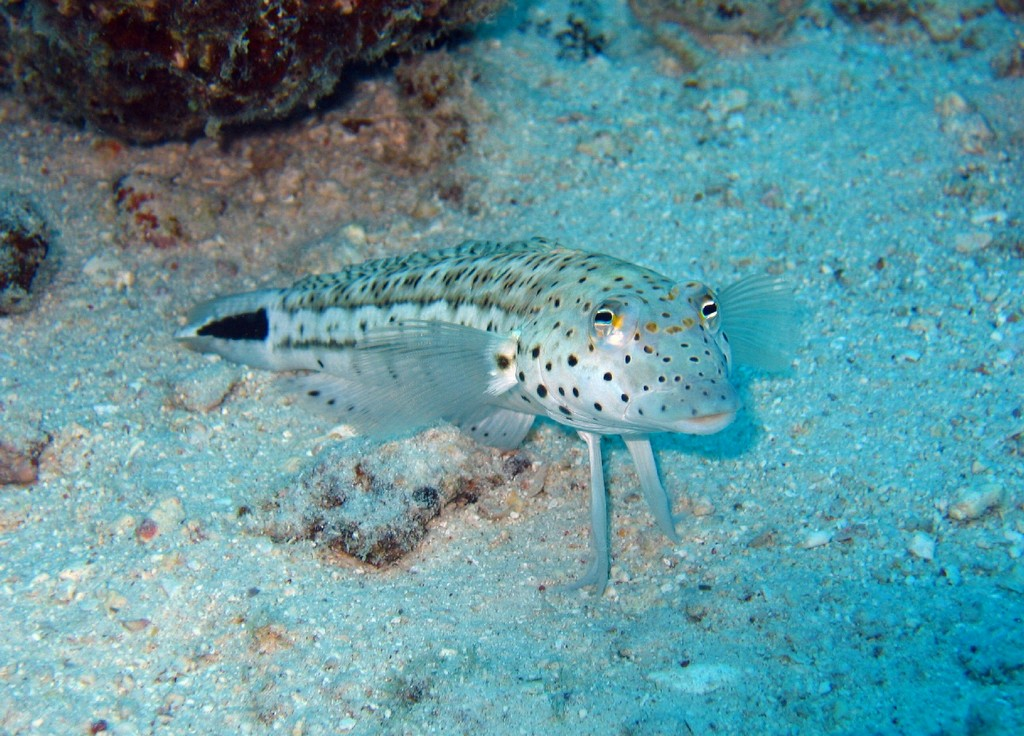
A speckled sand perch perched on coral sand

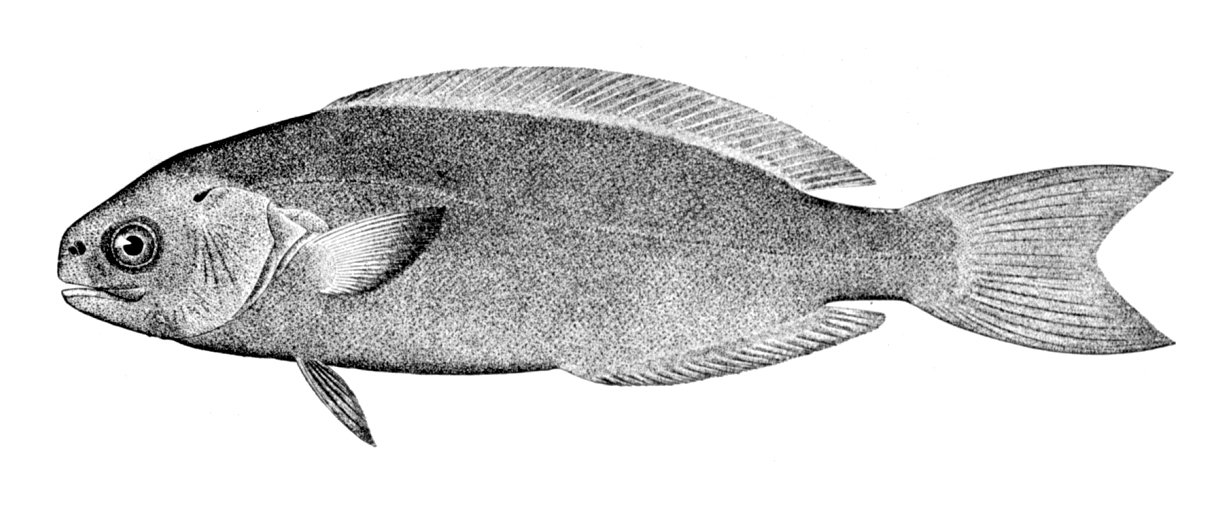
The rudderfish (Centrolophus niger) is a medusa fish

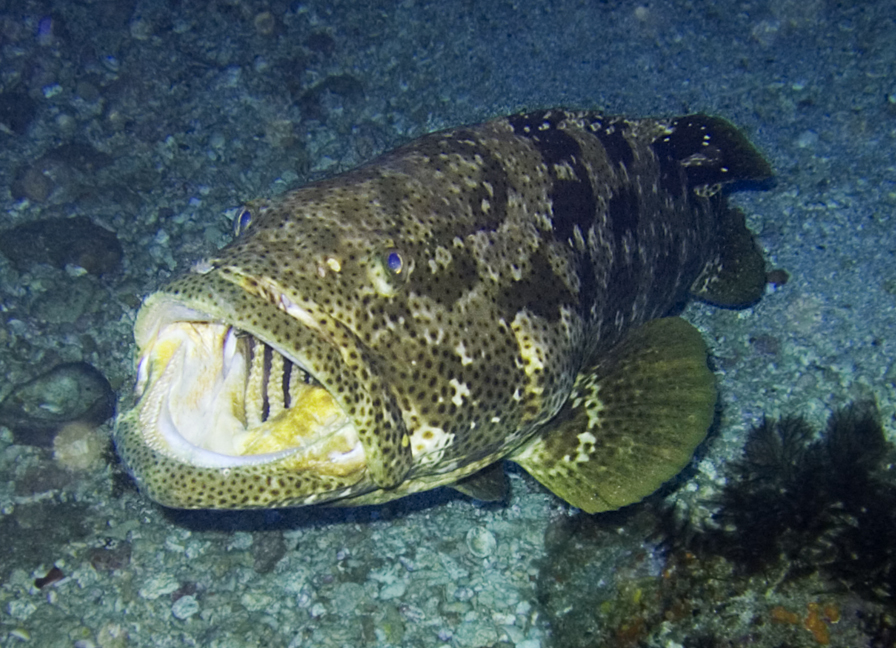
Malabar grouper

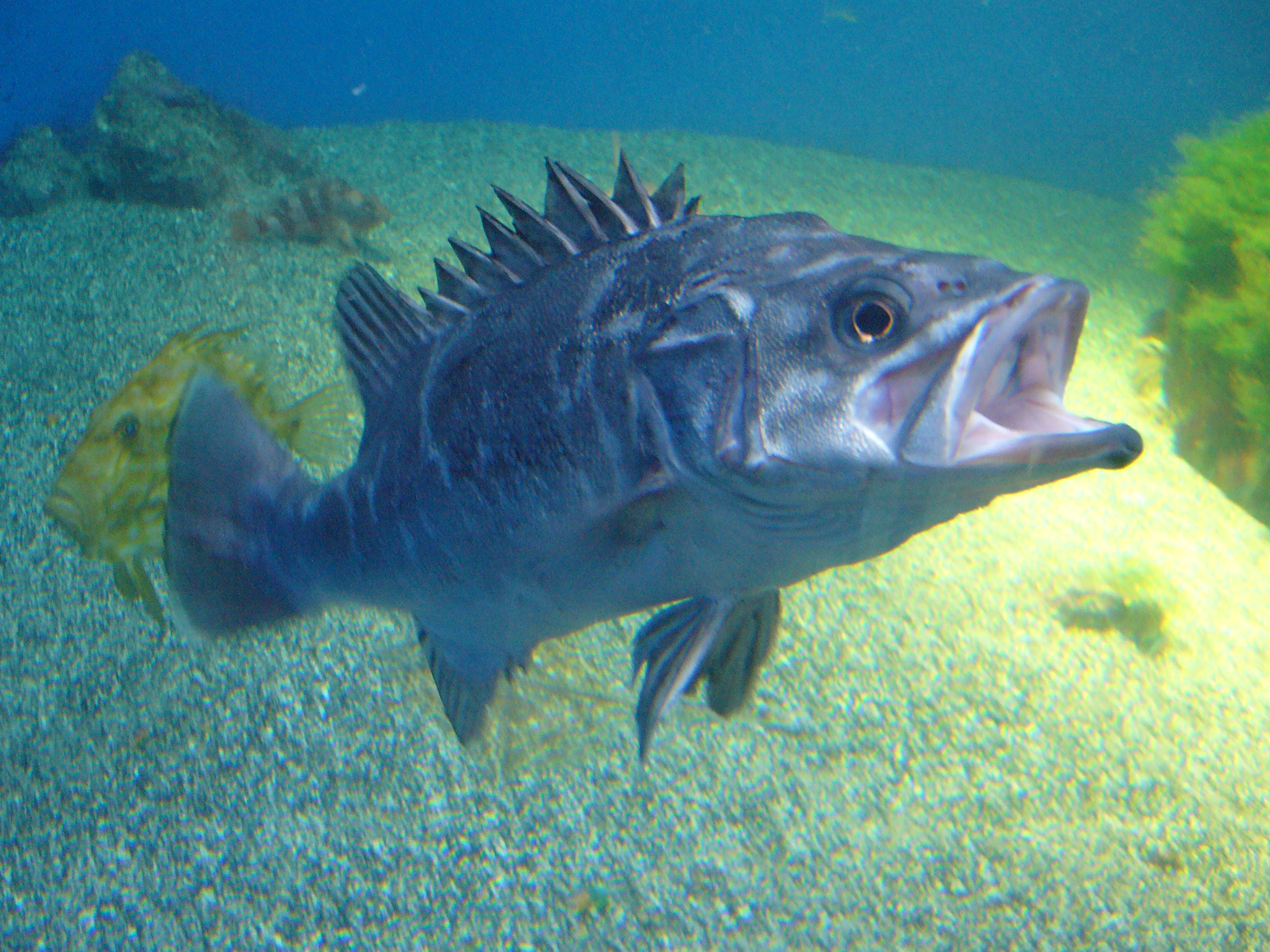
Atlantic wreckfish inhabit caves and wrecks. They are good game fish, reaching a maximum reported length of 210 cm (6.9 ft) and weight of 100 kg (220 lb).
- Grouper are fish belonging to a number of genera in the subfamily Epinephelinae of the family Serranidae, in the order Perciformes. Species of grouper include the black, comet, gag, giant, Goliath, Nassau, saddletail, tiger, Warsaw, white and yellowfin grouper. Typical lengths are 80–120 centimetres. They inhabit depths from reefs near the surface down to over 400 metres. They feed on just about any moving animal they encounter. Groper are important inshore commercial fish, usually caught with gill nets (in earlier times longlines were used).
- Wreckfish are a family Polyprionidae of perciform fishes, found on the floor of the continental shelf and slope where they inhabit caves and shipwrecks (thus their common name). The Atlantic wreckfish is at depths between 40 and 600 m (130 and 1,970 ft). They are largely a solitary fish, though juveniles school below floating objects. Their diet includes large ocean cephalopods, crustaceans, and other bottom-dwelling fishes.

== See also ==
- Coral reef fish
- Demersal fish
- Forage fish
- Marine habitats
- Moorish idol
- Monkfish
- NaGISA
- Pelagic fish
- Shoaling and schooling
- Weever
