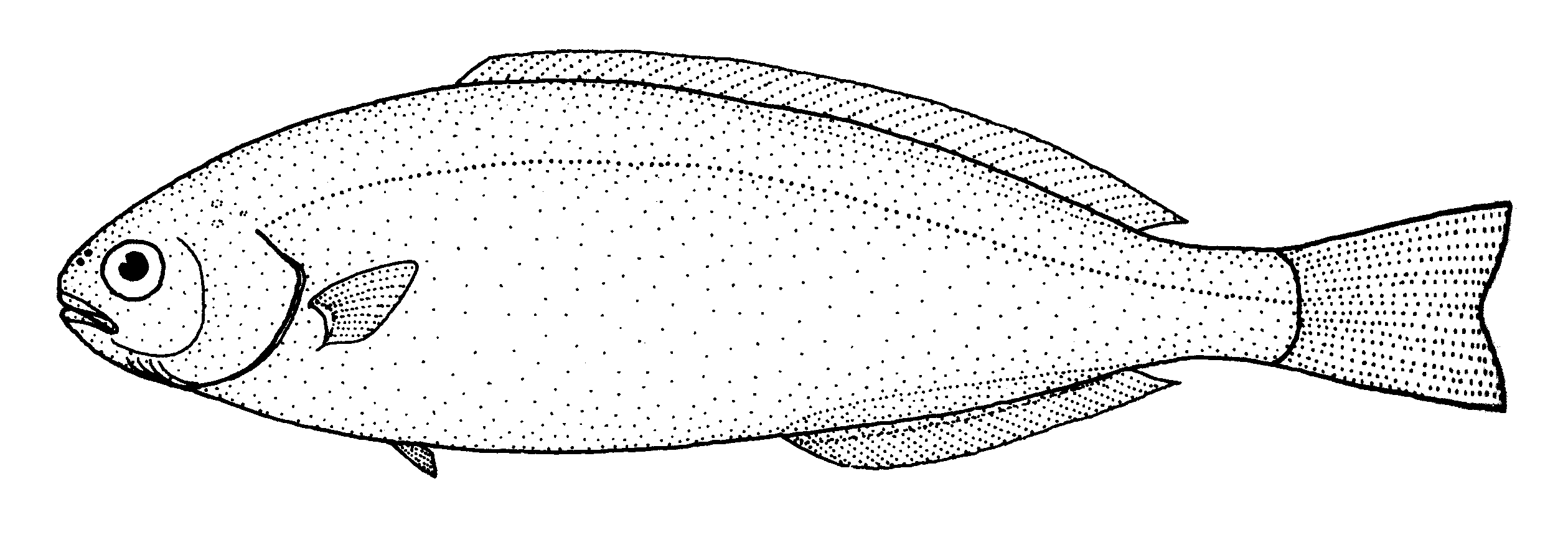
- Drawing by Dr Tony Ayling

Scientific classification
- Kingdom: Animalia
- Phylum: Chordata
- Class: Actinopterygii
- Order: Scombriformes
- Family: Centrolophidae
- Genus: Pseudoicichthys; Parin & Permitin, 1969
- Species: P. australis

Binomial name
- Pseudoicichthys australis Haedrich, 1966

= Southern driftfish =

Species of ray-finned fish

The southern driftfish or ragfish, Pseudoicichthys australis, is a species of medusafish. The Catalog of Fishes places it in the monospecific genus Pseudoicichthys, but as of 2024 FishBase retains it in the genus Icichthys together with I. lockingtoni. It is found around the world in all southern oceans between latitudes 50° S and 60° S, from the surface down to 2,000 m. Its length is from 35 to 80 cm.
