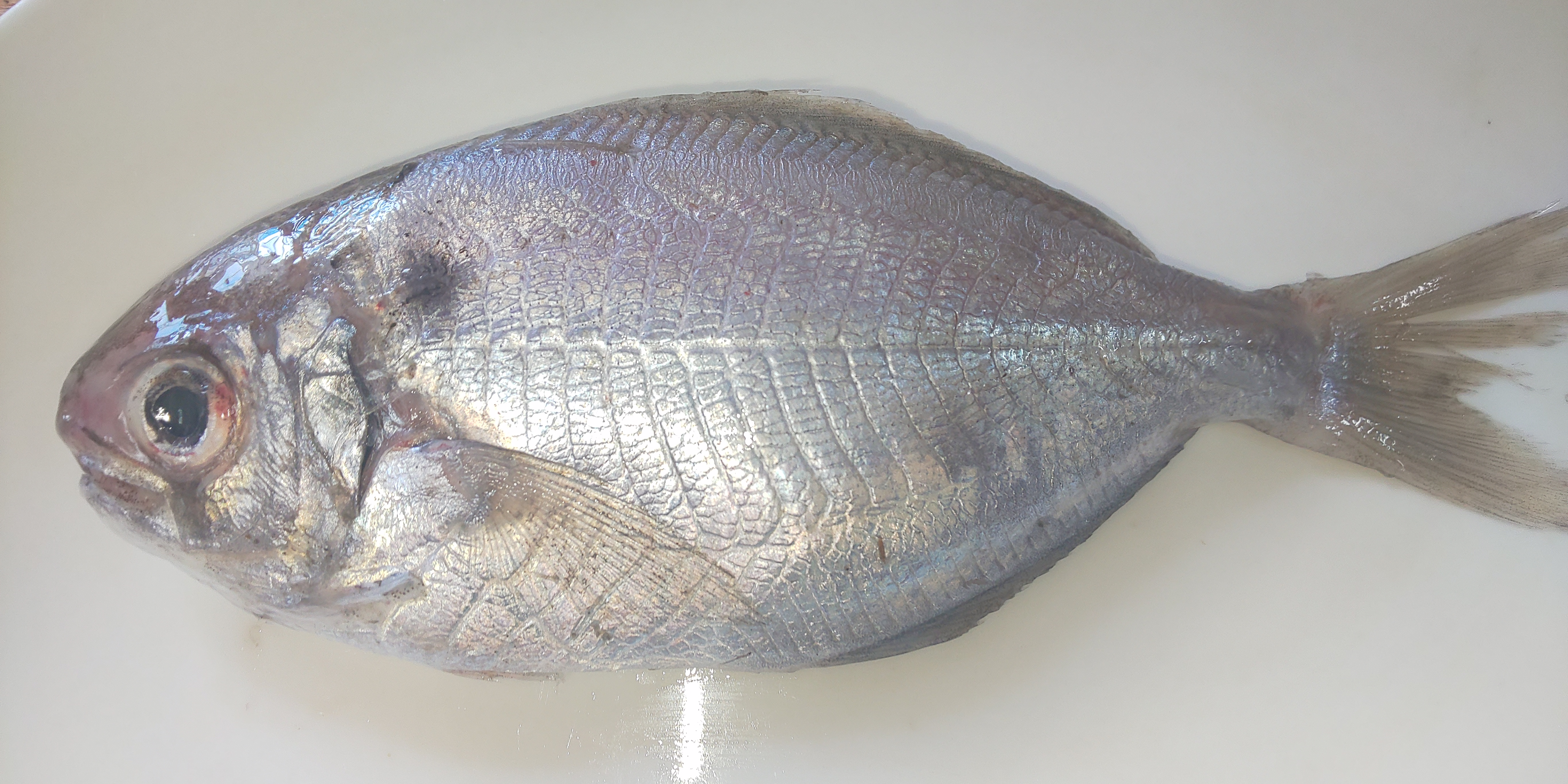
- Pacific Rudderfish (P. anomala)

Scientific classification
- Kingdom: Animalia
- Phylum: Chordata
- Class: Actinopterygii
- Division: Teleostei
- Order: Scombriformes
- Family: Centrolophidae
- Genus: Psenopsis; T. N. Gill, 1862

Type species
- Trachinotus anomalus Temminck & Schlegel, 1844

Synonyms
- Bathyseriola Alcock, 1890

= Psenopsis =

Genus of ray-finned fishes

Psenopsis is a genus of medusafishes native to the Indian Ocean and the western Pacific Ocean.

== Species ==
There are currently six recognized species in this genus:

- Psenopsis anomala (Temminck & Schlegel, 1844) (Pacific rudderfish)
- Psenopsis cyanea (Alcock, 1890) (Indian ruff)
- Psenopsis humerosa Munro, 1958 (Blackspot butterfish)
- Psenopsis intermedia Piotrovsky, 1987
- Psenopsis obscura Haedrich, 1967 (Obscure ruff)
- Psenopsis shojimai Ochiai & K. Mori, 1965
