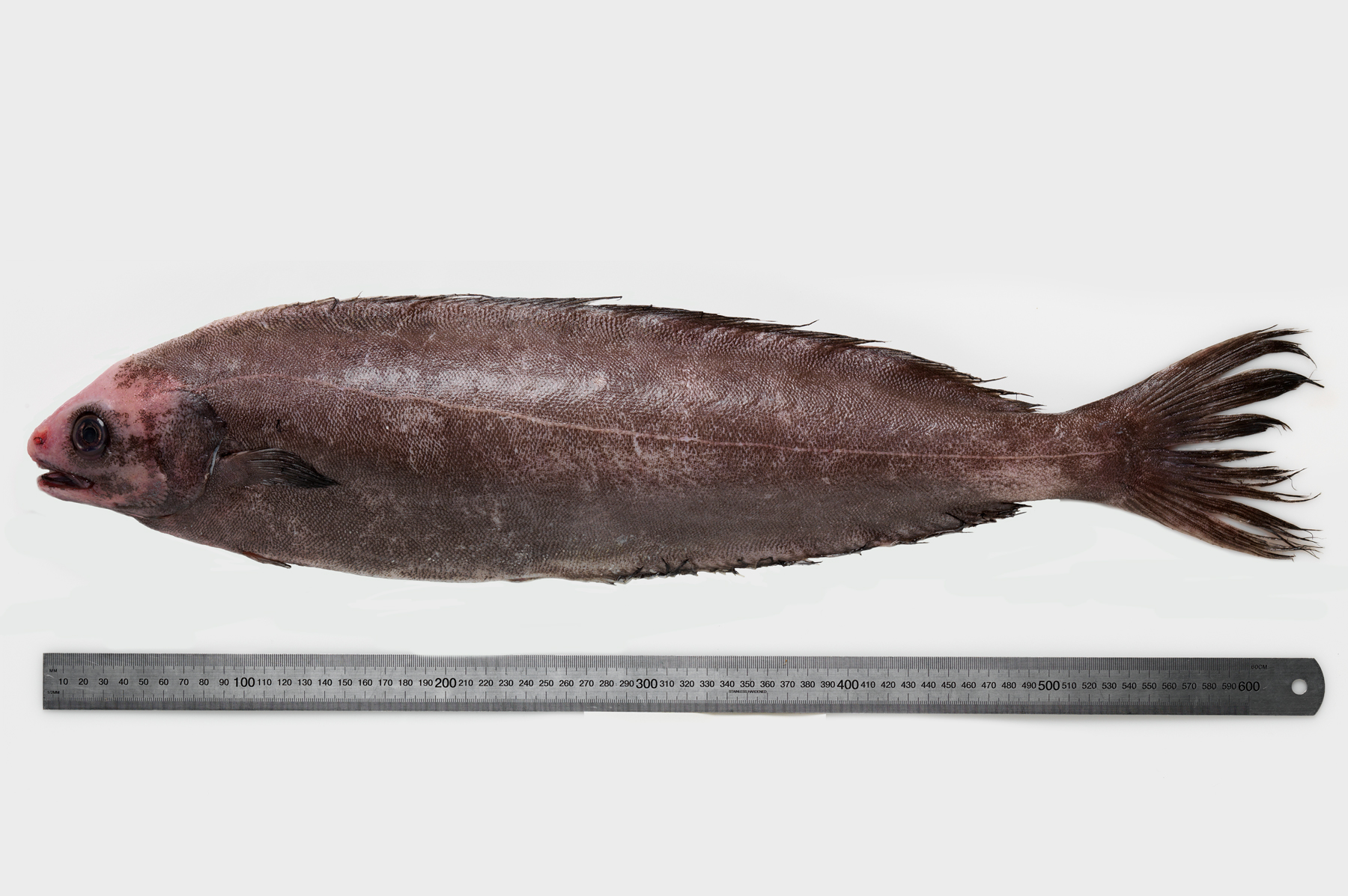

Conservation status
- Least Concern (IUCN 3.1)

Scientific classification
- Kingdom: Animalia
- Phylum: Chordata
- Class: Actinopterygii
- Order: Scombriformes
- Family: Centrolophidae
- Genus: Schedophilus
- Species: S. huttoni

Binomial name
- Schedophilus huttoni (Waite, 1910)

Synonyms
- Centrolophus huttoni Waite, 1910; Coroplopus dicologlossops J. L. B. Smith, 1966

= New Zealand ruffe =

Species of ray-finned fish

The New Zealand ruffe, Schedophilus huttoni, is a medusafish of the family Centrolophidae found in southern Atlantic, Indian, and Pacific Oceans as far north as latitude 18°S, at depths of up to 1,000 m. Its length is up to 90 cm.
