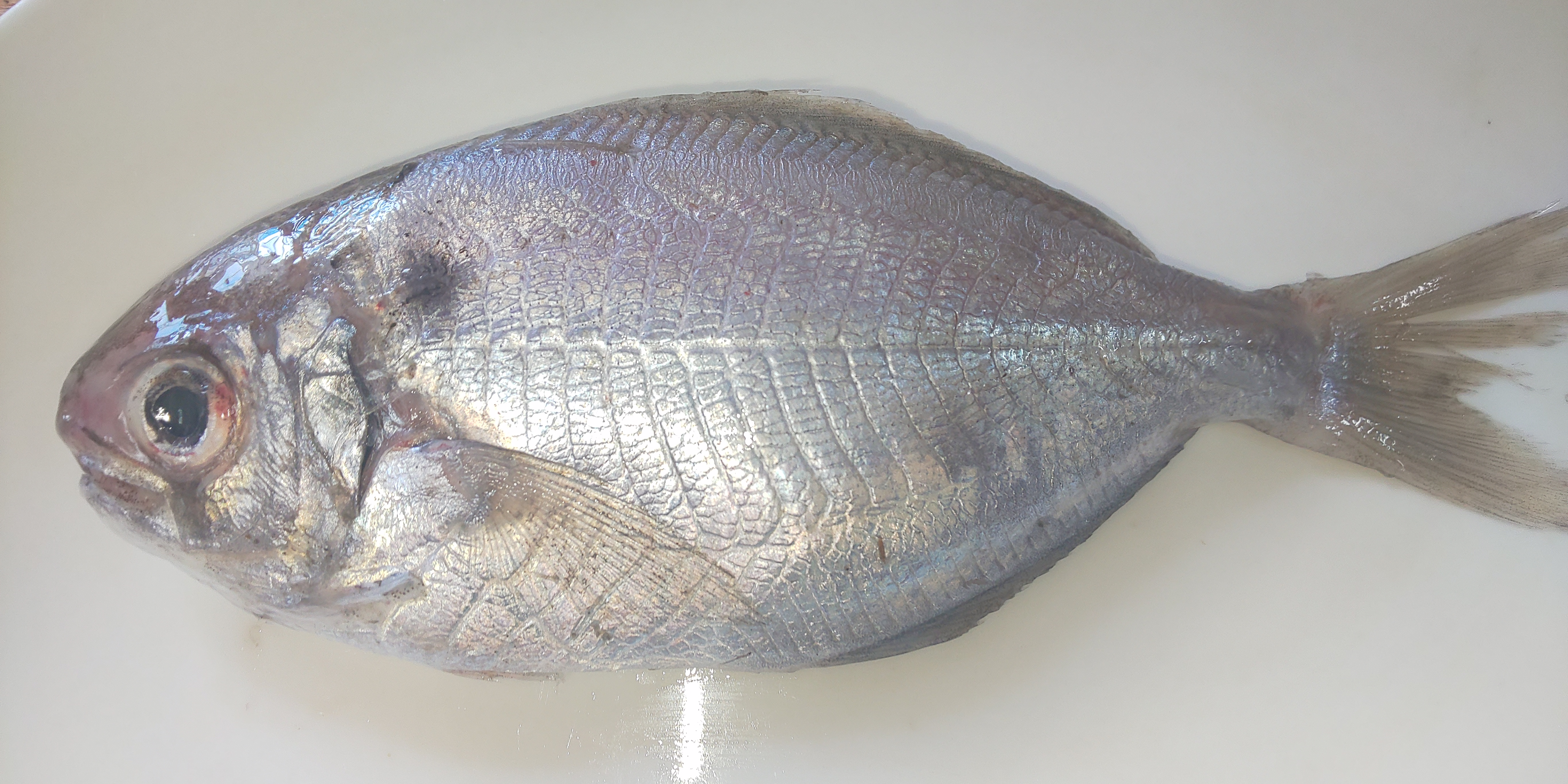
- The Japanese butterfish

Conservation status
- Least Concern (IUCN 3.1)

Scientific classification
- Kingdom: Animalia
- Phylum: Chordata
- Class: Actinopterygii
- Division: Teleostei
- Order: Scombriformes
- Family: Centrolophidae
- Genus: Psenopsis
- Species: P. anomala

Binomial name
- Psenopsis anomala (Temminck & Schlegel, 1844)

Synonyms
- Trachinotus anomalus Temminck & Schlegel, 1844

= Pacific rudderfish =

Species of fish

The Pacific rudderfish (Psenopsis anomala) is a marine fish also known by such names as Japanese butterfish, melon seed, wart perch, ibodai (Japanese name, イボダイ) or simply but ambiguously as butterfish.

This fish, which can grow to 30 cm (12 in) TL, is found in the Western Pacific, near Japan, in the Taiwan Strait and in the East China Sea. The Japanese butterfish prefers tropical waters: around 42°N–19°N. It has been found in the waters near Hong Kong. Generally, they inhabit the epipelagic layer to 370 m (1213 ft). Adults are mainly bottom-dwelling, but migrate upward at night in search of food.

The Japanese butterfish has a compressed body, somewhat oval-shaped, and is whitish to grayish in colour; in the young fish, the colour is darker: a pale brown or blackish brown. Some other features of this fish are a robust snout, a relatively small mouth, and the upper jaw extending to below the anterior margin of the eye. The fish's teeth are small, conical, and incisor-like. Spines of the Japanese butterfish's dorsal fin are short and not separated from the soft-rayed portion. The scales on the body of the butterfish are small, cycloid, and very deciduous (meaning that they are shed off easily).

This species is of economic importance, commercially sought after, and caught by trawl by Japanese and Taiwanese fishermen. The total catch reported for this species in 1999 was 10,871 t, with Taiwan (5,075 t), and Japan (4,996 t) making up nearly all the catch. The peak season of the species is from October to March of the following year.

The meat of the Japanese butterfish is very popular as food in its native range. The most common way of cooking the fish are steamed, pan-fried, or used in sushi. In Tokushima, a regional cuisine, bōze no sugata sushi (ボウゼの姿寿司), is made with Japanese butterfish. Bōze (ボウゼ) is the regional name of the Japanese butterfish in Tokushima.
