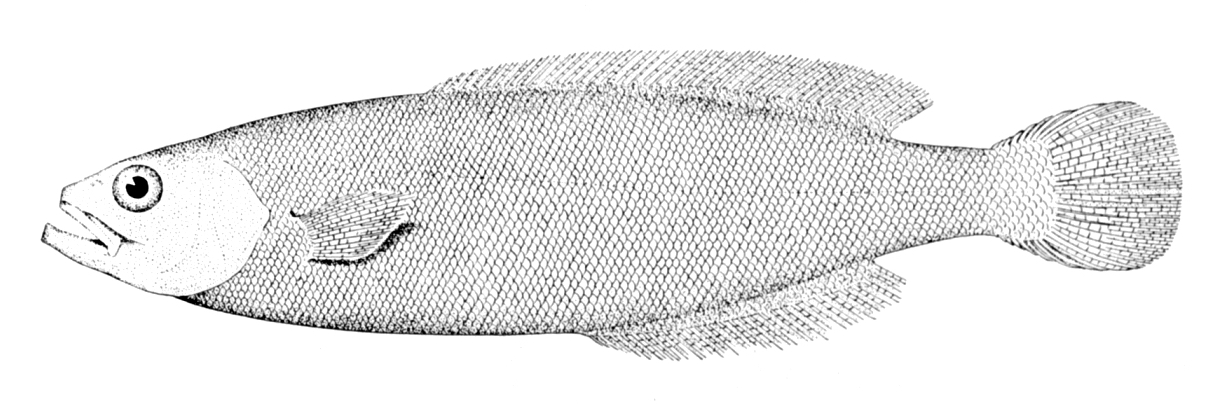
- Medusafish (I. lockingtoni)

Scientific classification
- Domain: Eukaryota
- Kingdom: Animalia
- Phylum: Chordata
- Class: Actinopterygii
- Order: Scombriformes
- Suborder: Stromateoidei
- Family: Centrolophidae
- Genus: Icichthys; D. S. Jordan & C. H. Gilbert, 1880

Type species
- Icichthys lockingtoni D. S. Jordan & C. H. Gilbert, 1880

= Icichthys =

Genus of ray-finned fishes

Icichthys is a genus of medusafishes that are native to the eastern Indian Ocean and the northern Pacific Ocean.

== Species ==
There are currently two recognized species in this genus:

- Icichthys australis Haedrich, 1966 (Southern driftfish)
- Icichthys lockingtoni D. S. Jordan & C. H. Gilbert, 1880 (Medusafish)
