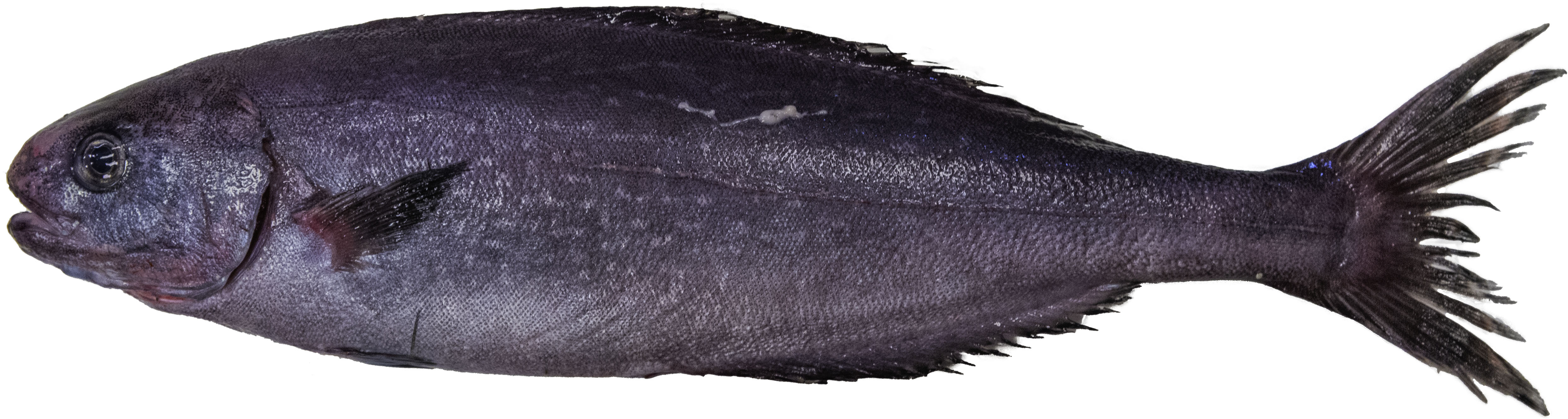

Conservation status
- Least Concern (IUCN 3.1)

Scientific classification
- Kingdom: Animalia
- Phylum: Chordata
- Class: Actinopterygii
- Division: Teleostei
- Order: Scombriformes
- Family: Centrolophidae
- Genus: Centrolophus; Lacépède, 1802
- Species: C. niger

Binomial name
- Centrolophus niger (J. F. Gmelin, 1789)

Synonyms
- Acentrolophus maculosus Nardo, 1827; Centrolophodes irvini Gilchrist & von Bonde, 1923; Centrolophus liparis Risso, 1827; Centrolophus maoricus Ogilby, 1893; Centrolophus morio Cuvier, 1833; Centrolophus pompilus (Linnaeus, 1758); Centrolophus valenciennesi Moreau, 1881; Coryphaena pompilus Linnaeus, 1758; Gymnocephalus messinensis Cocco, 1829; Mupus bifasciatus Smith, 1961; Perca nigra Gmelin, 1789; Schedophilus elongatus Johnson, 1862

= Centrolophus =

Black ruff

Genus of fishes

The black ruff (Centrolophus niger) is a medusafish, the only member of the genus Centrolophus. It is a pelagic fish found in all tropical and temperate oceans at depths of 0 to 1,000 m (0 to 3,280 ft). Its length is typically up to 60 cm (24 in), but it may reach 150 cm (60 in). Other common names include rudderfish and blackfish.

== Description ==
The black ruff has a robust fusiform body shape and can grow to a length 150 cm (60 in). The dorsal fin has five spines and 37 to 41 soft rays, the anal fin has three spines and 20 to 24 soft rays. The bases of these fins have a fleshy sheath clad with scales that partially conceals the rays. The head is grey and the body colour violet-black, dark brown or purplish, with a paler belly. The fins are darker than the body colour. Sometimes there are indistinct spots or a marbled pattern. The otoliths of black ruff are thin and delicate, and about 15 mm in length for a 40 cm fish.

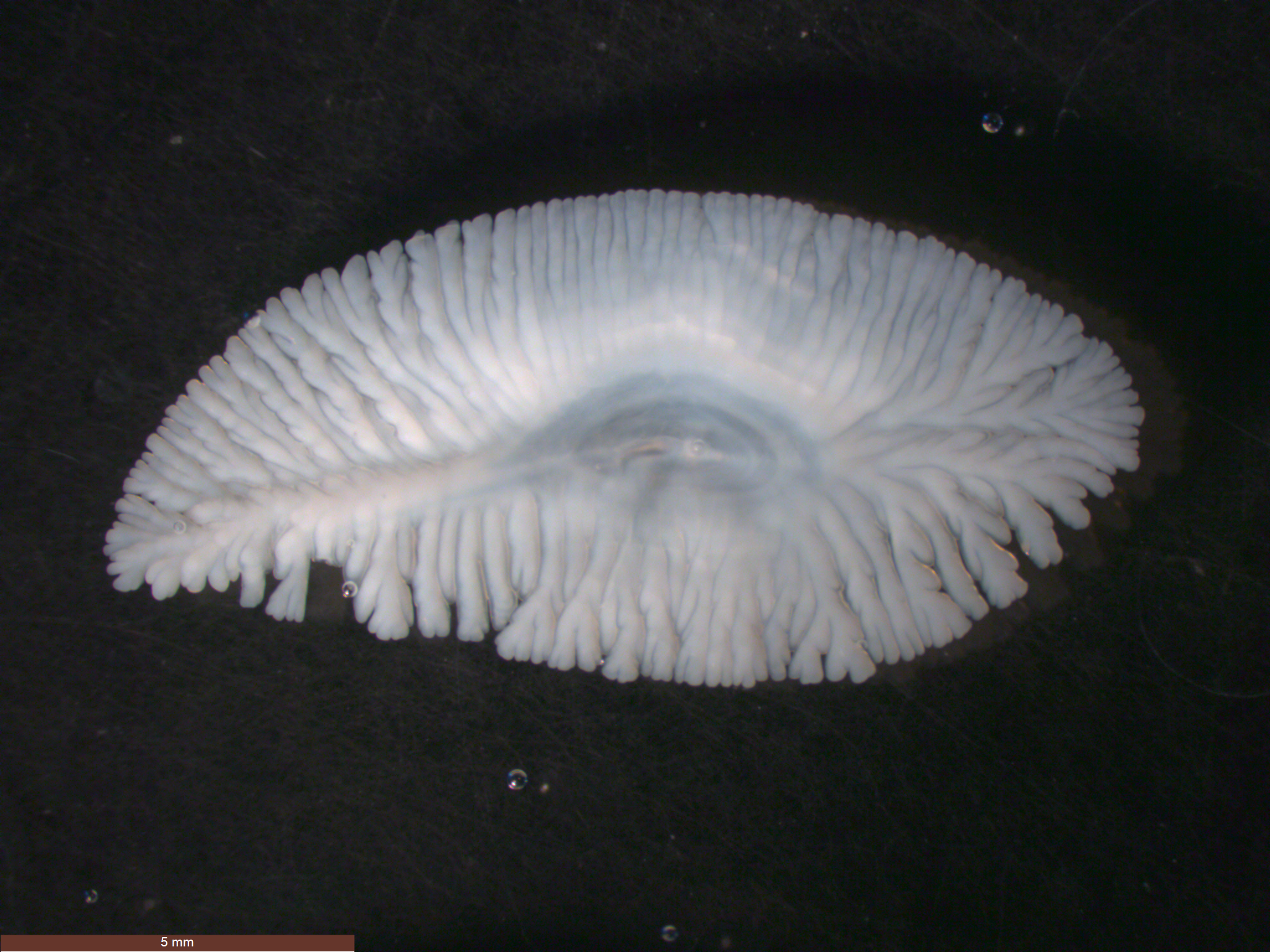
Otolith of black ruff.

== Distribution and habitat ==
The black ruff is known from the northwestern Atlantic Ocean, where its range extends from Nova Scotia to Massachusetts, the northeastern Atlantic and the Mediterranean Sea; also from the southeastern Atlantic and the Indian Ocean, its range including South Africa and Australia and New Zealand, as well as the Southern Ocean. It is a pelagic fish, and has been caught at a wide range of depths, from close to the ocean surface to over 1000 m. It is largely absent from the tropics. It is occasionally found in the waters around the British Isles, where it has been recorded off County Galway, County Donegal and the Isles of Scilly. In 1901, a specimen was caught in a salmon net in the Firth of Forth and was presented to the Edinburgh Museum.

== Ecology ==
Juvenile fish are believed to live in surface waters but adults live at greater depths where they may form small schools. Black ruff is a generalist feeder, preying on any available organisms of suitable size that are present. Prey items include small fish, crustaceans such as copepods and amphipods, squid, medusae and ctenophores.
