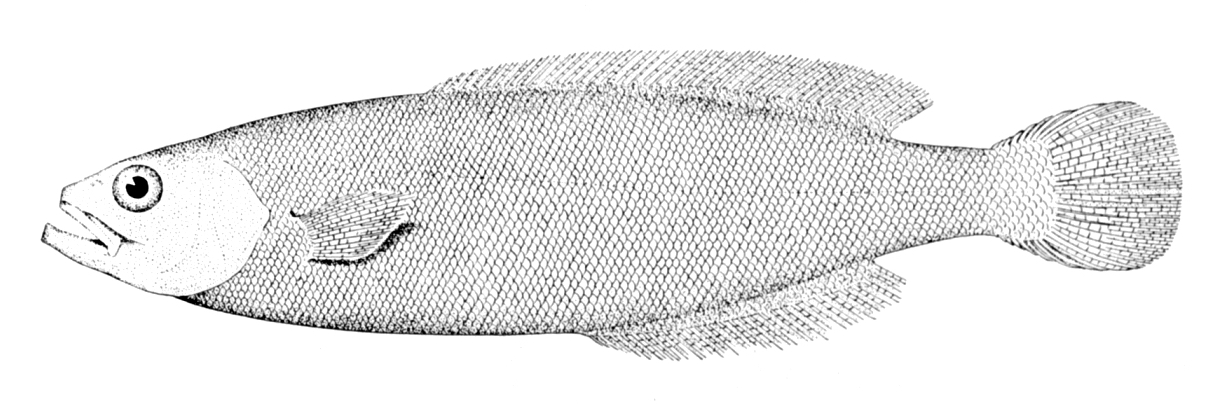

Scientific classification
- Kingdom: Animalia
- Phylum: Chordata
- Class: Actinopterygii
- Order: Scombriformes
- Family: Centrolophidae
- Genus: Icichthys
- Species: I. lockingtoni

Binomial name
- Icichthys lockingtoni Jordan & Gilbert, 1880

= Icichthys lockingtoni =

Species of ray-finned fish

Icichthys lockingtoni, commonly known as the medusafish, is a species of centrolophid ray-finned fish native to the northern Pacific Ocean, where it ranges from Japan and the Gulf of Alaska to central Baja California in Mexico. It typically occurs at a depth of 0 to 91 m (0 to 299 ft), although it has been reported from as deep as 900 m (2953 ft). Young individuals of the species are abundant offshore, often in association with jellyfish in a symbiotic relationship that is likely commensal. The species reaches 46 cm (18.1 inches) in total length.
