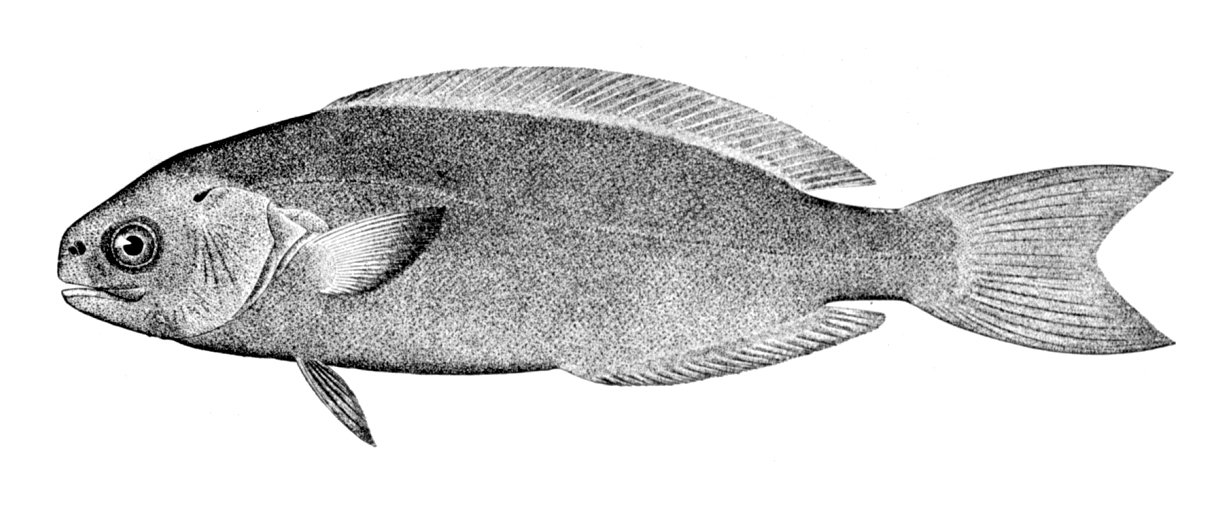
- Rudderfish (Centrolophus niger)

Scientific classification
- Kingdom: Animalia
- Phylum: Chordata
- Class: Actinopterygii
- Clade: Percomorpha
- Order: Scombriformes
- Suborder: Stromateoidei
- Family: Centrolophidae; Bonaparte, 1846

Genera
- see text

= Medusafish =

Medusafish Temporal range: Middle Paleocene to present

Family of ray-finned fishes

Medusafishes are a family, Centrolophidae, of scombriform ray-finned fishes. The family includes about 31 species. They are found in temperate and tropical waters throughout the world.

Young Icichthys lockingtoni specimens are abundant in the coastal waters of the north Pacific, where they are often found in association with jellyfish, which provide them with protection from predators and opportunities to scavenge the remains of the jellyfishes' meals.

The oldest known fossil member of the group known from articulated remains is Butyrumichthys from the earliest Ypresian of the Fur Formation in Denmark. Slightly older fossil otoliths of Eomupus sinuosus are also known from the Selandian of Denmark; the same or similar species was also reported from the Paleocene Aquia Formation (Maryland, United States).

== Genera ==
The following genera are classified within the family Centrolophidae:

- Centrolophus Lacépède, 1802
- Hyperoglyphe Günther, 1859
- Icichthys Jordan & Gilbert, 1880
- Psenopsis Gill, 1862
- Schedophilus Cocco, 1839
- Seriolella Guichenot, 1848
- Tubbia Whitley, 1943

The following fossil genera are also known:

- †Agarcia Baciu & Bannikov, 2004 (Early Oligocene of Romania)
- †Butyrumichthys Schrøder, Rasmussen, Møller & Carnevale, 2022 (Early Eocene of Denmark)
- †Eogorgon Calzoni, Giusberti & Carnevale, 2025 (Early Eocene of Italy)
- †Eomupus Schwarzhans et al, 2026 [otolith] (middle Paleocene to late Oligocene of Europe and North America)
- †Petrodavia Baciu & Bannikov, 2004 (Early Oligocene of Romania)
- †Zorzinia Bannikov, 2000 (Early Eocene of Italy)

The placements of Butyrumichthys, Petrodavia, and Agarcia are tentative.

== Timeline of genera ==
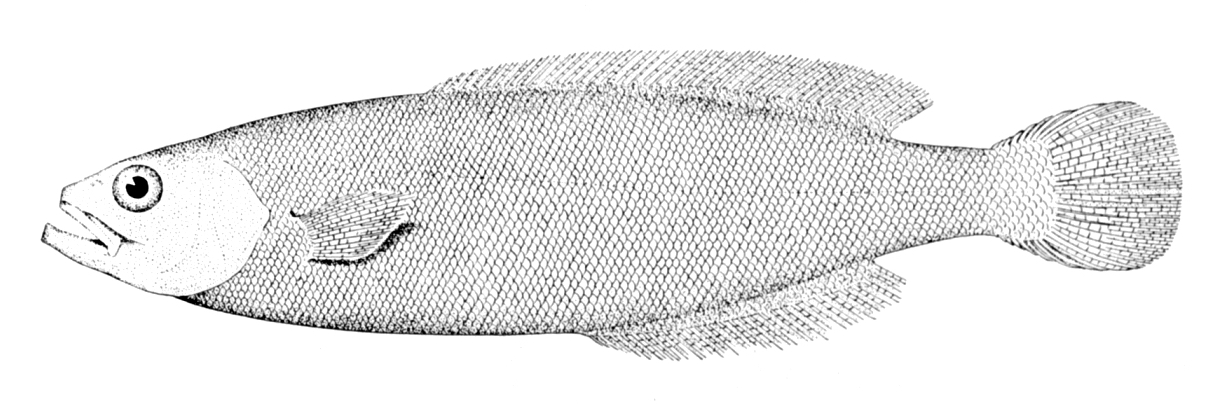
Medusafish, Icichthys lockingtoni

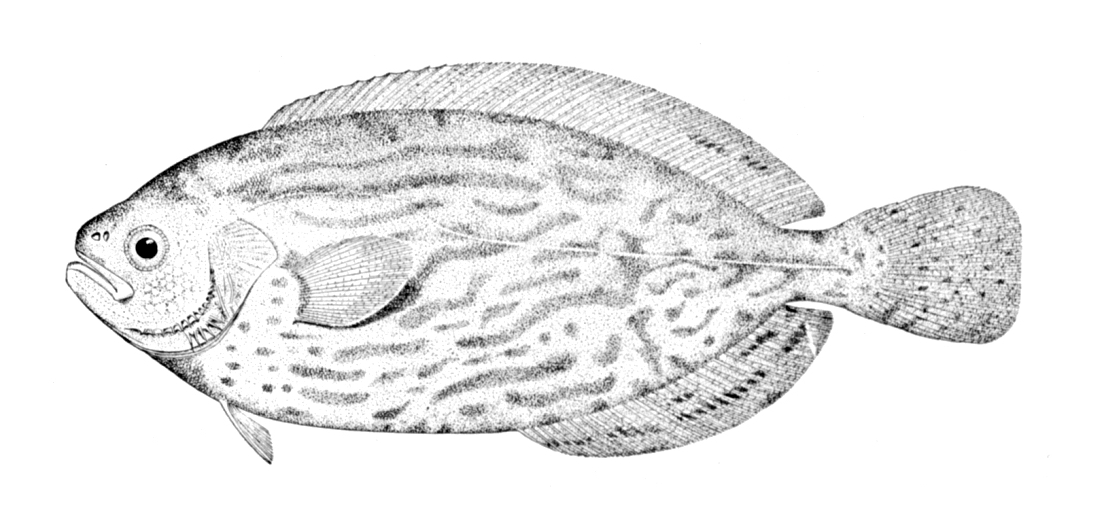
Cornish blackfish, Schedophilus medusophagus
