= Quota Management System =

New Zealand fishery management programme

The Quota Management System (QMS) is a type of individual fishing quota that is used in New Zealand to manage fish stocks.

== New Zealand fishing industry ==
Seafood is one of New Zealand's largest export markets, with 85% of catches being exported. Over 90% of the total revenue raised by the country's fishing industry comes from exported stocks, raising NZ$3 billion annually. The most valuable species is the hoki, Macruronus novaezelandiae.

For the purposes of QMS, New Zealand's exclusive economic zone (EEZ) is divided into ten quota management regions. A separate quota is defined for each species in each region, depending on the species' distributions, ranging from a single fishing quota market for the hoki to eleven for the abalone Haliotis iris.

== History ==
New Zealand is "the world leader in implementing IFQs". QMS was introduced by the Fisheries Amendment Act 1986, initially covering 26 marine species. The following year, it covered 30 species, and by 2005, it covered 93 species, out of the 140 commercial species in New Zealand's exclusive economic zone (EEZ). These comprised 550 separate fishing quota markets. QMS will eventually be extended to cover all living marine resources that are commercially exploited, including invertebrates, but excluding marine mammals. However, LegaSea, a non-profit environmental organisation based in New Zealand, argued that the Fisheries Act 1996 did not achieve its primary purpose of sustainable use of fisheries resources to provide for the well-being of the marine environment. They claimed that the QMS, managed under the Act, prioritised commercial fishing interests over sustainability, which resulted in declining fish stocks.

== Total allowable commercial catch ==
Species code	Name	TACC (kg)
ANC	Anchovy	560,000
ANG	Freshwater eels	420,150
BAR	Barracouta	32,672,461
BCO	Blue cod	2,681,496
BIG	Bigeye tuna	714,000
BNS	Bluenose	2,335,000
BUT	Butterfish	162,000
BWS	Blue shark	1,860,000
BYA	Frilled venus shell	16,000
BYX	Alfonsino	2,995,700
CDL	Cardinalfish	2,548,000
CHC	Red crab	48,000
COC	Cockle	3,214,000
CRA	Spiny red rock lobster	2,792,839
DAN	Ringed dosinia	203,000
DSU	Silky dosinia	8,000
ELE	Elephant fish	1,283,500
EMA	Blue mackerel	11,550,000
FLA	Flatfish	5,418,800
FRO	Frostfish	4,019,000
GAR	Garfish	50,000
GLM	Green-lipped mussel	1,720,000
GMU	Grey mullet	1,005,601
GSC	Giant spider crab	419,000
GSH	Ghost shark	3,012,000
GSP	Pale ghost shark	1,780,000
GUR	Gurnard	5,181,187
HAK	Hake	13,211,143
HOK	Hoki	120,010,000
HOR	Horse mussel	29,000
HPB	Hapuku and bass	2,181,600
JDO	John Dory	1,140,400
JMA	Jack mackerel	60,547,234
KAH	Kahawai	2,728,000
KBB	Bladder kelp	1,509,600
KIC	King crab	90,000
KIN	Kingfish	200,000
KWH	Knobbed whelk	67,000
LDO	Lookdown dory	783,000
LEA	Leatherjacket	1,431,000
LFE	Long-finned eel	82,000
LIN	Ling	22,226,000
MAK	Mako shark	406,000
MDI	Trough shell	160,000
MMI	Large trough shell	180,000
MOK	Blue moki	608,112
MOO	Moonfish	527,000
OEO	Oreo	18,860,000
ORH	Orange roughy	8,221,000
OYS	Dredge oyster	15,544,000
PAD	Paddle crab	765,000
PAR	Parore	84,000
PAU	Pāua	1,058,499
PDO	Deepwater tuatua	629,000
PHC	Packhorse rock lobster	40,300
PIL	Pilchard	2,485,000
POR	Porae	71,000
POS	Porbeagle	215,000
PPI	Pipi	204,000
PRK	Prawn killer	36,000
PTO	Patagonian toothfish	49,500
PZL	Deepwater clam	31,500
QSC	Queen scallop	380,000
RBM	Ray's bream	980,000
RBT	Redbait	5,050,000
RBY	Ruby fish	812,000
RCO	Red cod	8,278,385
RIB	Ribaldo	1664,000
RSK	Rough skate	1,986,000
RSN	Red snapper	146,000
SAE	Triangle shell	725,000
SBW	Southern blue whiting	43,408,000
SCA	Scallop	841,000
SCC	Sea cucumber	35,000
SCH	School shark	3,436,100
SCI	Scampi	1,291,000
SFE	Short-finned eel	347,000
SKI	Gemfish	1,060,394
SNA	Snapper	6,357,300
SPD	Spiny dogfish	12,660,000
SPE	Sea perch	2,170,000
SPO	Rig	1,919,064
SPR	Sprats	450,000
SQU	Arrow squid	127,332,381
SSK	Smooth skate	849,000
STA	Stargazer	5,456,400
STN	Southern bluefin tuna	413,000
SUR	Kina	1,147,000
SWA	Silver warehou	1,0380,201
SWO	Swordfish	885,000
TAR	Tarakihi	6,439,173
TOR	Pacific bluefin tuna	116,000
TRE	Trevally	3,933,103
TRU	Trumpeter	144,000
TUA	Tuatua	43,000
WAR	Blue warehou	4,512,358
WWA	White warehou	3,735,000
YEM	Yellow-eyed mullet	68,000
YFN	Yellowfin tuna	263,000

== See also ==
- Fishing industry in New Zealand
- Environment of New Zealand
