= Warehou =

Warehou may refer to these fish:

- Blue warehou or common warehou, Seriolella brama
- Silver warehou, Seriolella punctata
- White warehou, Seriolella caerulea
- Bluenose warehou, Hyperoglyphe antarctica
