= Minister for Oceans and Fisheries =

New Zealand minister of the Crown

- Coat of arms of New Zealand

- Flag of New Zealand

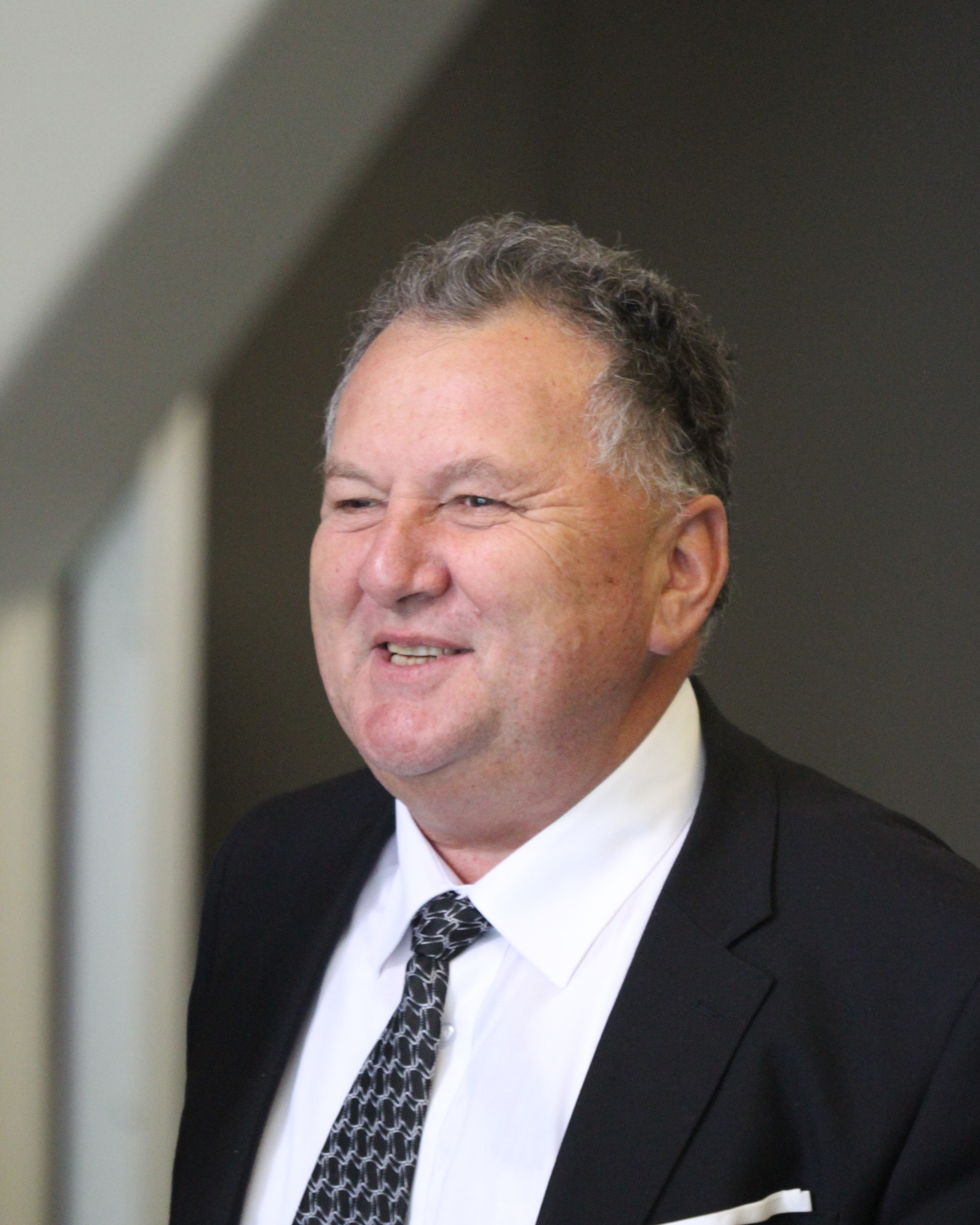
- Incumbent; Shane Jones since 27 November 2023
- Ministry for Primary Industries
- Style: The Honourable
- Member of: Cabinet of New Zealand; Executive Council
- Reports to: Prime Minister of New Zealand
- Appointer: Governor-General of New Zealand
- Term length: At His Majesty's pleasure
- Formation: 8 March 1977
- First holder: Jim Bolger
- Salary: $288,900
- Website: www.beehive.govt.nz

The Minister for Oceans and Fisheries is a minister in the New Zealand Government responsible for the management of New Zealand's fisheries, including aquaculture, and for oceans policy.

The present minister is Shane Jones, a member of the New Zealand First party.

== Responsibilities ==
The Minister oversees Fisheries New Zealand, a business unit of the Ministry for Primary Industries (previously, the Ministry of Fisheries).

The Minister has responsibility for legislation related to fisheries, including the Fisheries Act 1996, the Maori Commercial Aquaculture Claims Settlement Act 2004, the Maori Fisheries Act 2004 and the Treaty of Waitangi (Fisheries Claims) Settlement Act 1992.

== History ==
The position was established in 1977 during the Muldoon government. Previously, responsibility for fisheries was exercised by the Minister of Marine until 1972 and by the Minister of Agriculture and Fisheries until 1977. For a brief period from 2010 to 2011, the portfolio was known as Fisheries and Aquaculture. From 2011 until 2017, it was combined with related portfolios into the Minister for Primary Industries.

The title change to Minister for Oceans and Fisheries in 2020 was intended to balance commercial and environmental issues. Responsibility for oceans policy was previously in the remit of the Minister of Conservation.

== List of ministers ==
The following ministers held the office of Minister of Fisheries.

Key

Labour National Progressive NZ First

No.	Name	Portrait	Term of Office		Prime Minister
As Minister of Fisheries
1	Jim Bolger		8 March 1977	13 December 1978	Muldoon
2	Duncan MacIntyre		13 December 1978	26 July 1984	Muldoon
3	Colin Moyle		26 July 1984	9 February 1990	Lange
3	Colin Moyle		26 July 1984	9 February 1990	Palmer
4	Ken Shirley		9 February 1990	2 November 1990	Palmer
4	Ken Shirley		9 February 1990	2 November 1990	Moore
5	Doug Kidd		2 November 1990	16 December 1996	Bolger
6	John Luxton (Note: as Minister of Food, Fibre and Biosecurity from 31 August 1998)		16 December 1996	10 December 1999	Bolger
6	John Luxton		16 December 1996	10 December 1999	Shipley
7	Pete Hodgson		10 December 1999	26 February 2004	Clark
8	David Benson-Pope		26 February 2004	19 October 2005	Clark
9	Jim Anderton		19 October 2005	19 November 2008	Clark
10	Phil Heatley		19 November 2008	25 February 2010	Key
-	David Carter Acting		25 February 2010	1 April 2010	Key
As Minister for Fisheries and Aquaculture
(10)	Phil Heatley		1 April 2010	14 December 2011	Key
2011–2017: No separate appointments (see Minister for Primary Industries)
11	Stuart Nash		26 October 2017	6 November 2020	Ardern
As Minister for Oceans and Fisheries
12	David Parker		6 November 2020	1 February 2023	Ardern
12	David Parker		6 November 2020	1 February 2023	Hipkins
(11)	Stuart Nash		1 February 2023	28 March 2023	Hipkins
-	David Parker; Acting		28 March 2023	12 April 2023	Hipkins
13	Rachel Brooking		12 April 2023	27 November 2023	Hipkins
14	Shane Jones		27 November 2023	Incumbent	Luxon

Table footnotes:

== See also ==
- Aquaculture in New Zealand
- Fishing industry in New Zealand
