= New Zealand seafood poster =

The poster with photography by Terry Hann

The New Zealand seafood poster is a poster with over 70 species of commercial fish species in New Zealand. The poster has been described as being "a staple at fish and chip shops" in New Zealand and has been described as an item of Kiwiana. There are two main versions of the poster, with one of them using photographs by Terry Hann and the other being designed by United Fisheries.

== History ==
The original poster design was made in 1977 by the New Zealand Fishing Industry Board. It depicted 28 species, illustrated by the cartoonist Eric Heath. The poster also included ocean waves and a white and green trawler. There were several updates to the poster in the 1970s and 1980s, including the conversion from using illustrations to colour photographs to depict the fish. After six years of photographing fish, the photographer Terry Hann released a new version of the poster in 1994, which depicts 71 species. In 2018, Māori names were added to the poster, and the fish were resized to correctly show the size differences between them. In January 2021, Hann said that over 20,000 copies of his version of the poster have been sold.

In 2019, the Sunday Star-Times described the poster as New Zealand's "most famous nautical poster", "a staple at fish and chip shops" and an item of Kiwiana. In 2021, RNZ reported that the poster is "in every fish and chip shop in the country." There are two main seafood posters in New Zealand, with one of them using photographs by Terry Hann and the other being designed by United Fisheries.

== Description ==
=== Terry Hann version ===
The poster with fish photographs by Terry Hann contains 71 of New Zealand's commercial fish species on a white background. The poster does not include all the commercial New Zealand fish species but instead the most common ones. Hann has stated, "There's a lot more that aren't on there, but what I wanted to do was create a poster that had interest, colour, and vitality to it, and the more fish you put in there, the smaller they get."

In one instance, Hann used polystyrene and string to pose the fins and tail of a fish, and used Photoshop to remove evidence of this from the poster. He has described photographing fish from trawlers as difficult as the trawling often disfigured the fish. On one voyage, Hann threw pufferfish he thought were dying overboard with gloved hands, unaware the spikes were lethal. In 2019, Hann stated that he had been attempting to photograph a white warehou for 14 years, but was unsuccessful.

=== United Fisheries version ===
A seafood poster by United Fisheries uses images from the New Zealand Fishing Industry Board. This version of the poster has the hoki and squid resized. It also has a black and white seahorse on the bottom right, behind Greek text that translates to "Good Luck", as the founder of United Fisheries is from Cyprus. This version of the poster also features the flag of Cyprus on the top left, a kiwi and fern on the top right, and a map of New Zealand on the bottom left. United Fisheries gives away the posters for free, provided the recipients pay for the postage. The company has estimated that they have given away "hundreds of thousands" of the posters.

== Adaptations ==
In 2015, Te Papa created their own fish poster entitled "The Fishes of New Zealand", which features 222 species of fish. Set on a blue background, the fish come from the four-volume book The Fishes of New Zealand.

In 2024, the charity Sustainable Coastlines and creative agency Augusto created a "Trash species of Aotearoa New Zealand" poster. Rather than having species of fish, it depicted 21 common forms of litter in New Zealand. The names of the litter species combine the type of rubbish and a name of a real fish species. For example, there is the "blue pod", a combination of blue cod and vape pods; "smoki", a combination of cigarette butts and hoki; and "yellowtin tuna", a combination of yellowfin tuna and tin cans.

Hann has created a freshwater fish version of the poster and aimed in 2024 to get it in every school in New Zealand.

The illustrator Giselle Clarkson has created tea towels based on the poster with common New Zealand afternoon tea foods, with one being dedicated to biscuits and slices.

== In popular culture ==
The seafood poster featured in a 2019 Taskmaster UK episode in which the contestants were tasked with bringing "the best thing from a shed". Rose Matafeo, from New Zealand, brought a version of the poster. As a reference to this, the seafood poster featured in a 2022 episode of Taskmaster New Zealand in which the contestants were told to commit as many names from the poster to memory as possible in 100 seconds.

A version of the poster features in the horror fishing video game Dredge.

== See also ==
- Fishing industry in New Zealand
