= Barrelfish =

Barrelfish may refer to:

== Animals ==
- Hyperoglyphe, a genus of fishes of the medusafish and butterfish family, also known as barrelfishes
  - Hyperoglyphe perciformis, the barrelfish, a bathypelagic fish found in the Northern Atlantic Ocean with a wide range

== Computers ==
- Barrelfish (operating system), an experimental computer operating system
