= Rāhui =

Cultural convention in Polynesia and New Zealand

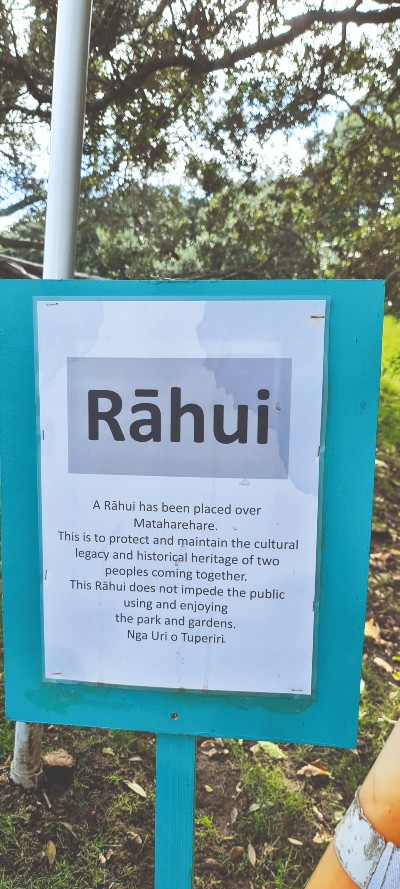
Rāhui notice at Dove Myer Robinson Park, March 2021.

Among Polynesians, a rāhui (in Tahitian and Maori; also in Rarotongan: raʻui or rahui) is a form of tapu restricting access to, or use of, an area or resource by local guarding authorities (kaitiaki in New Zealand) of the area in the spirit of stewardship (kaitiakitanga).

A rāhui in New Zealand is imposed by the Ministry of Fisheries with the passing of the 1996 Fisheries Act, a role that has since been taken over by the Ministry for Primary Industries. In the Cook Islands, raʻui have been put in place by the National Environment Service. In French Polynesia since the 2010s, many communities have worked with the territorial government to establish rāhui marine management systems..

== In New Zealand ==
Rāhui may be imposed for many reasons, including a need for conservation of food resources or because the area concerned is in a state of tapu, due, for example, to a recent death in the area, out of respect for the dead and to prevent the gathering of food there for a specified period. Rāhui may be placed on land, sea, rivers, forests, gardens, fishing grounds, and other food resources. A rāhui is given its authority by the mana of the person or group that imposes it.

An area may be set aside for a special purpose or function. Trees may be set aside as a carving resource; or flax bushes for the weaving of a special cloak for a chief. Areas may be placed under rāhui requiring them to be left to lie fallow so that the resources may regenerate.

The custom of rāhui is still used today, and it has similarities to the bans imposed by the present day legal system on the gathering of food resources for conservation purposes; however Māori often perceive such bans on the gathering of traditional resources such as shellfish and native birds as 'another denial of their customary rights.'

A sign or physical symbol may be displayed to show that a rāhui has been imposed. Sometimes a carved or decorated wooden stick or post may be placed in the ground. Natural features of the landscape can indicate the boundaries of the area that is under restriction. Additionally, people will be informed about the placing of the rāhui.

The imposing of rāhui by Māori iwi has no official legal standing, and penalties are not formally imposed upon anyone breaking a rāhui, but it is seen as culturally insensitive to do so.

=== Notable rāhui ===
==== Whakaari / White Island following 2019 volcanic eruption ====
Following the volcanic eruption of Whakaari / White Island, in which 20 people were killed, a rāhui was placed on the island restricting access. It was reported that the rāhui was placed on the island following a ceremony which took place at the mouth of the Whakatāne River at 4 am on Tuesday 10 December 2019. The Buttle family, who have owned the island for over 80 years, asked that the rāhui be respected. The rāhui was lifted on Saturday 28 December.

==== Mataharehare Pā site, Parnell, Auckland City ====
A rāhui was placed on the site by Ngāti Whātua-o-Ōrākei and Tainui elders in March 2021, shortly before construction work on a controversial National Erebus memorial was scheduled to start. This rāhui carries unusual significance given its application is deemed primarily a political act.

== In French Polynesia ==
Rāhui is also practiced in French Polynesia. Rāhui here has three types:

- rāhui māʻa hotu – concerning only selected fruiting trees are allowed for selected families.
- rāhui haʻari – rotational permission between families to harvest coconuts (haʻari) on communal land
- rāhui tairoto – on lagoons.
