= Butchers Dam =

Lake in New Zealand

Coordinates: 45°17′32″S 169°20′40″E

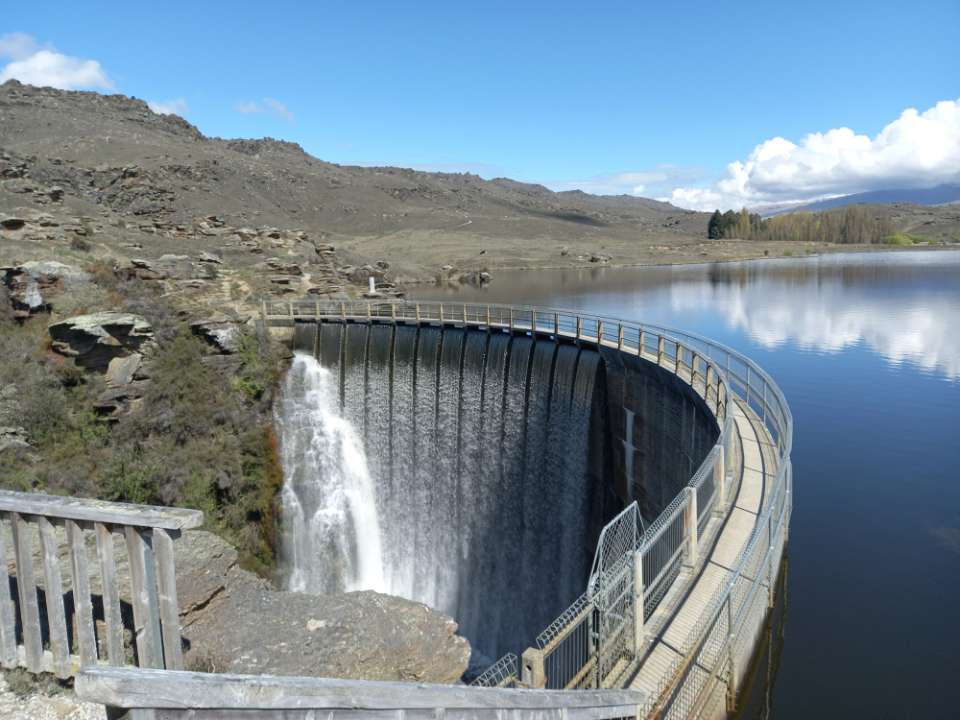
Butchers Dam in 2025

Butchers Dam is a lake 5 kilometres southwest of Alexandra, Central Otago, in the South Island of New Zealand. The lake, on the eastern side of Alexandra-Fruitlands Road of New Zealand State Highway 8, is named for its concrete dam. It used to be an important water supply for Alexandra, but is now mostly used for irrigation purposes. Its construction began in 1935 and was completed in 1937 as a water reservoir for Alexandra during the Great Depression. The 2.5 kilometres (1.6 mi) Butchers Dam Loop Track passes by the lake's shores. There is a historic hut on the north coast of Butchers Dam. In the winter, the lake freezes over and is good for ice skating. Butchers Dam is a popular site for local fishing for its proximity to Alexandra, and is open for fishing activities all year round. The most common catches in Butchers Dam are brown trout and rainbow trout.

The small Butchers Creek, which is both the inflow and outflow of the lake, feeds the Clutha River less than 2 kilometres (1.2 mi) downstream.

== History ==
In 1862, near the beginning of the Otago gold rush, gold was discovered in Butchers Gully. In 1865, a butchery and store were established by the gully, as miners began to scour the area for gold. The Butchers Gully Hotel was constructed in 1868, as the first road between Roxburgh and Alexandra was finished. The hotel burned down in 1886, and a replacement hotel to cater to miners and locals was maintained until the gully was submerged under Butchers Dam in 1937.
