= Fisheries Act 1983 =

Act of Parliament in New Zealand

New Zealand Parliament
- Long title: An Act to consolidate and reform the law relating to the management and conservation of fisheries and fishery resources within New Zealand and New Zealand fisheries waters
- Royal assent: 23 September 1983
- Commenced: 1 October 1983

Related legislation
- Fisheries Act 1996
- Status: Current legislation

The Fisheries Act 1983 is an Act of Parliament in New Zealand. An important provision of the Act was establishing the Quota Management System, one of the first individual fishing quota systems. The Act was largely repealed with the passage of the Fisheries Act 1996.

== See also ==
- Fisheries Act
- Fishing industry in New Zealand
