= Fisheries Act 1996 =

Act of Parliament in New Zealand

New Zealand Parliament
- Long title: An Act— (a) to reform and restate the law relating to fisheries resources; and (b) to recognise New Zealand's international obligations relating to fishing; and (c) to provide for related matters
- Royal assent: 13 August 1996
- Administered by: Ministry for Primary Industries; Overseas Investment Office (sections 56 to 57J)

Related legislation
- Fisheries Act 1983
- Status: Current legislation

The Fisheries Act 1996 is a New Zealand Act of Parliament. It is divided into five areas: recreational, customary, environmental, commercial and international fishing. It is currently administered by the Ministry of Primary Industries and the Overseas Investment Office (sections 56 to 57J), but was formerly administered by the Overseas Investment Commission and the now-disestablished Ministry of Fisheries (New Zealand). The Act mostly deals with the minimum size requirements and maximum quantity limit for each species of fish and seafood before they can be caught for selling or consumption.

The Act empowers law enforcement of fisheries by enforcement officers named Fisheries Officers and Honorary Fishery Officers. Officers are empowered with powers of search, arrest, seizure and issuance of fines. There are regular prosecutions under the act for the taking of pāua.

The Act also details customary fishing regulations by Māori. For example, section 186 deals with temporary closures of customary Māori fisheries, a process known as rāhui.

LegaSea, a non-profit environmental organisation based in New Zealand, argued that the Fisheries Act 1996 did not achieve its primary purpose of sustainable use of fisheries resources to provide for the well-being of the marine environment.

== See also ==
- Fisheries Act
- Fishing industry in New Zealand
- Minister for Oceans and Fisheries
