= Fishing industry in New Zealand =

External media

Images
- EEZ map 1 Archived 28 December 2008 at the Wayback Machine
- EEZ map 2

Audio
- Inshore Fishing RadioNZ documentary

Map of the sea floor around New Zealand

As with other countries, New Zealand's 200 nautical mile exclusive economic zone gives its fishing industry special fishing rights. It covers 4.1 million square kilometres. This is the sixth largest zone in the world, and is fourteen times the land area of New Zealand.

The New Zealand zone has a rich and unusually complex underwater topography. Over 15,000 marine species are known to live there, about ten percent of the world's diversity. Many of these are migratory species, but New Zealand's isolation means also that many of the marine species are unique to New Zealand.

The Ministry of Primary Industries recognises that climate change is affecting fishing and aquaculture industries in New Zealand.

== Statistics ==
New Zealand's wild fisheries captured 441,000 tonnes and earned over NZ$1 billion in exports in the fishing year 2006/07. The aquaculture of mussels, salmon and oysters earned another $226 million. This made seafood the country's fifth largest export earner.

There are about two tonnes of fish in the New Zealand fisheries for every New Zealander. Just under ten percent of this stock is harvested each year. In the fishing year 2006/07, there were 1,316 commercial fishing vessels and 229 processors and licensed fish receivers, employing 7,155 people. About 1.2 million or 31 percent of New Zealanders engage, at least occasionally, in recreational fishing with an annual recreational take of about 25,000 tonnes.

== Historical development ==
Traditionally New Zealand's fishing industry was an inshore one largely confined to the domestic market, favoring small, artisanal vessels such as mullet boats. From 1938 to 1963, there was a licensing system operating, involving gear and area controls. Starting in the 1960s, the offshore waters, outside the then 12 nautical mile territorial sea, were exploited by Japanese, Taiwanese, South Korean, and Soviet trawlers.

In 1977 the 200 nautical mile exclusive economic zone was established. These zones were established because countries wanted protection from foreign fishing vessels. Because New Zealand's territory includes the Chatham Islands and other outer islands, its EEZ is 4.1 million square kilometres, the sixth largest fishing zone in the world.

This was a huge resource, and expectations were high. The inshore fisheries had become over exploited, and the search was on for new offshore fisheries. New Zealand companies embarked on joint ventures with foreign companies. Trawling crews from other nations taught New Zealanders how to fish deep waters and in return got a share of the catch.

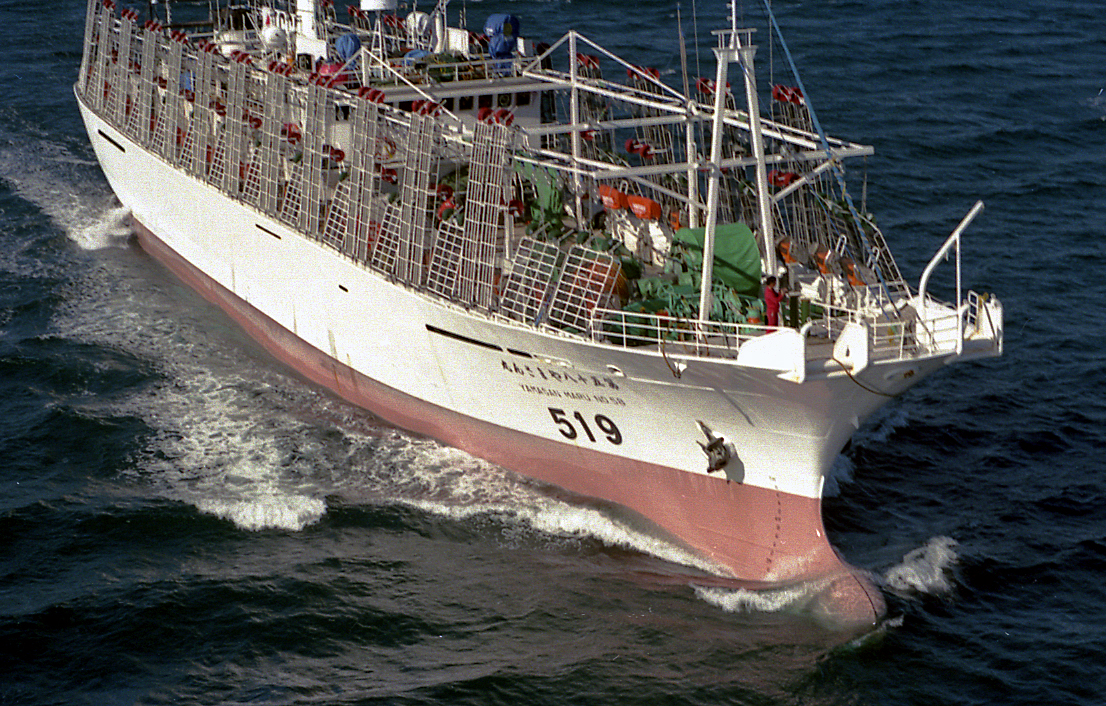
Squid jigger in Cook Strait

By 1980 the consequences of the "Think Big" policy for the fishing industry were becoming very apparent. Mel Courtney, MP for Nelson and convenor of the Opposition fisheries' sub-committee on production and marketing, in asserting "the policy is falling apart", expressed the view of many. "The industry expanded so rapidly it was overcapitalized with too many boats...the inshore fleet expanded and joint venture and duty-free boats exerted further pressure" (Commercial Fishing June 1980 5).

Deep-water trawling is highly mechanised and massive capital investment is normally required to operate modern factory trawlers. These ships process everything caught on board. Even the guts and heads are processed into fishmeal, which is so valuable it is known as "brown gold". Elsewhere, major fisheries, such the northern hemisphere cod fisheries, were collapsing. Fishing companies in New Zealand were able to buy or lease the redundant trawlers cheaply. At the same time, the collapse of northern fisheries resulted in an unmet need in the world market for quality whitefish. Hoki and orange roughy from New Zealand were in demand.

In 1986 New Zealand became the first country to introduce a property-rights based Quota Management System (QMS) system. There are currently (2008) 129 species which are targeted commercially. There are about 60 species groups with a QMS allowance for customary Māori fishers, with a similar number for recreational fishers. The fisheries are managed through the Fisheries Act 1996, which sets out the rules and regulations and the QMS was administered by the Ministry of Fisheries until April 2012 when it was amalgamated into the Ministry for Primary Industries.

== The fishery in the 2000s ==
By 2000, the industry had developed from being a domestic supplier to exporting over 90 percent of the fish harvest.

Over the ten years between 2008 and 2017, 180,100 km^{2} or 4.4% of the New Zealand's sea floor was fished by the method of bottom trawling. This was 13.0% of the 'fishable' seafloor area open to bottom-contacting trawling in waters shallower than 1600 m, and 11% of seafloor area in 0–1600 m depths. More than 90 percent of New Zealand's seafloor (Territorial Sea and Exclusive Economic Zone) has never been touched by trawlers.

== Fishing grounds ==
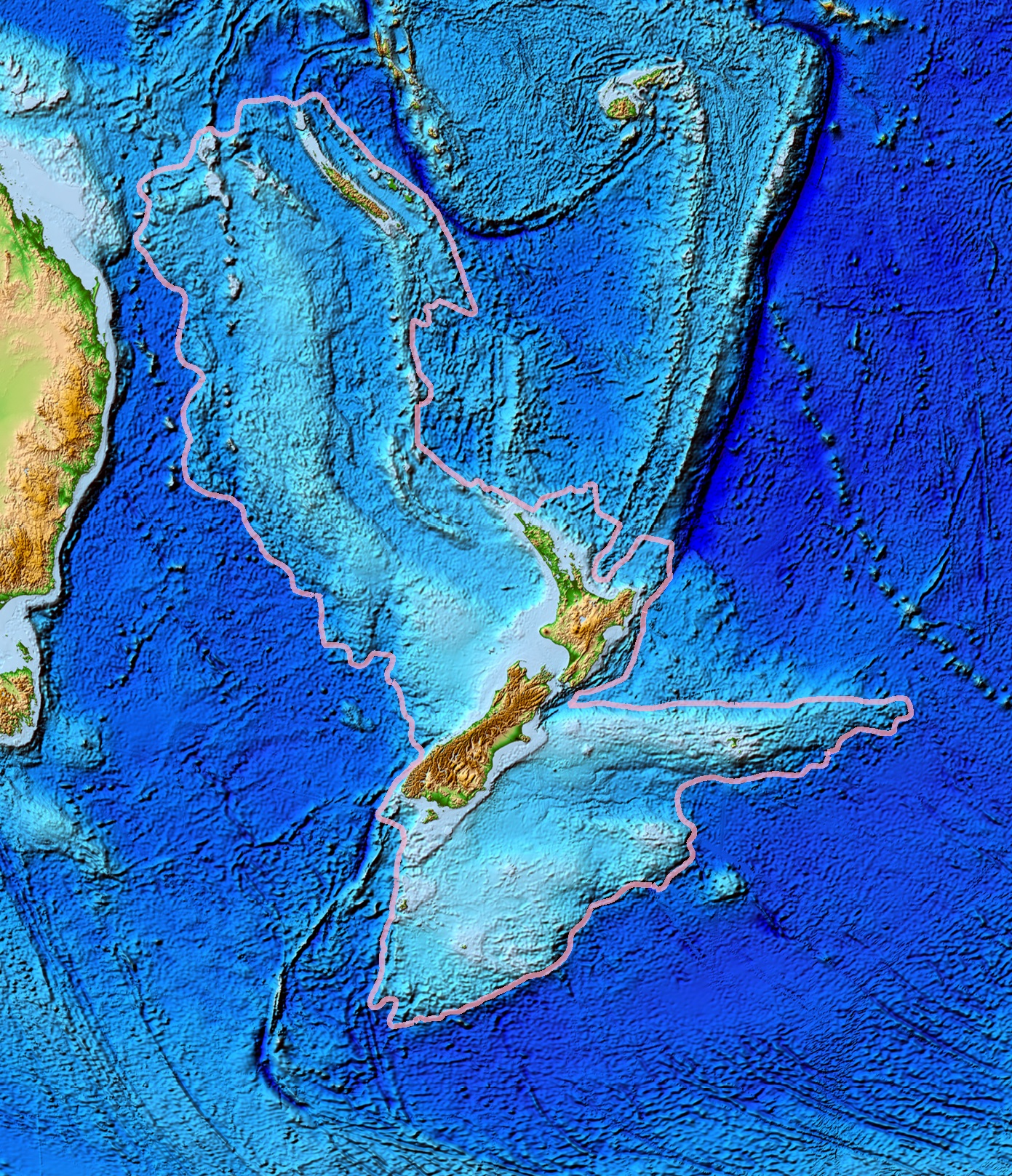
New Zealand is surrounded by an unusually complex underwater typography.

Coastal estuaries dot New Zealand's 15,000 km coastline. Coastal fisheries have access to a large continental shelf, and further afield are large continental rises. Together these relatively shallow fishing grounds occupy about thirty percent of the area of the EEZ. Yet further out in the deep ocean lie undersea mountain ranges and volcanoes, and deep oceanic trenches. The 10,000 metre deep Kermadec Trench is the second deepest trench on Earth.

=== High seas fishing ===
The high seas are those areas of ocean not covered by any country's Exclusive Economic Zone. New Zealand has international obligations to ensure New Zealand flagged vessels are aligned with proper conservation and management of the high seas fisheries. These are met in Part 6A of the Fisheries Act 1996. These obligations come from the United Nations Convention on the Law of the Sea and the 1995 Straddling Fish Stocks Agreement.

== Māori role ==
The Treaty of Waitangi signed in 1840 guaranteed Māori, the indigenous people of New Zealand, "undisturbed possession" of the fisheries until they chose to dispose of them to the Crown. Breaches of the Treaty were claimed over many years by Māori and included the introduction of the Quota Management System (QMS) in 1986. A Treaty of Waitangi claim was settled in 1992 that enabled Māori purchase of 50% of Sealord (a major owner of fisheries quota) and a 20% percent of commercial fishing quota for new species. A settlement of 20% of marine farming space (aquaculture) around New Zealand coasts and harbours was enacted in The Maori Commercial Aquaculture Claims Settlement Act 2004. Te Ohu Kai Moana is implementing this allocation. Māori have now built their commercial stake to the point where they control or influence more than thirty percent of the commercial fisheries.

== Climate change ==
Climate change is affecting fish stocks and the fishing and aquaculture industries in New Zealand, through marine heatwaves, higher average water temperatures, and ocean acidification. Effects include changes in fish ranges, warmer water temperatures changing the suitability of areas for aquaculture, loss of habitat species, and loss of species from some areas when a species cannot adapt to higher temperatures.

== Timeline ==
- 1790s: Sealers and whalers arrive.
- 1875: Seal hunting restricted to a short annual season.
- 1894: Protection of fur seal population due to declining numbers.
- 1908: the Fisheries Act 1908 is passed
- 1977: The Territorial Sea and Exclusive Economic Zone Act is passed.
- 1979: Marine Mammals Protection Act came into force.
- 1983: Fisheries Act 1983 comes into force (establishes a fishing quota system).
- 1986: Quota Management System (QMS) introduced to conserve fish stocks within the Exclusive Economic Zone.
- 1989: Māori Fisheries Act is passed.
- 1992: Treaty of Waitangi (Fisheries Claims) Settlement Act
- 1996: Fisheries Act 1996 is passed (though parts of it come into force only spasmodically over the next few years).
- 2000: Moratorium on new marine farming applications, initially for two years.
- 2003: Ministry of Agriculture and Forestry, Ministry for the Environment, and Fonterra sign the Dairying and Clean Streams Accord.
- 2004: Moratorium on marine farms lifted after the passage of the Aquaculture Reform (Repeals and Transitional Provisions) Act 2004.
- 2005: First criminal conviction for killing a fur seal is handed down.
- 2005: Thirty five squid boats ordered to return to port from their sub-Antarctic fishing grounds for breaking a voluntary code of practice designed to protect seabirds.
- 2006: The New Zealand fishing industry proposes limits on bottom trawling.
- 2006: New Zealand Fisheries officers' request to be allowed to carry batons and pepper spray is denied.
- 2007: Great white sharks given protection within New Zealand's EEZ
- 2007: Bottom trawling prohibited in selected areas.
- 2007: The orange roughy fishery is closed to allow stocks of the fish to recover.

== See also ==
- Aquaculture in New Zealand
- Agriculture in New Zealand
- Exclusive economic zone of New Zealand
- New Zealand seafood poster
