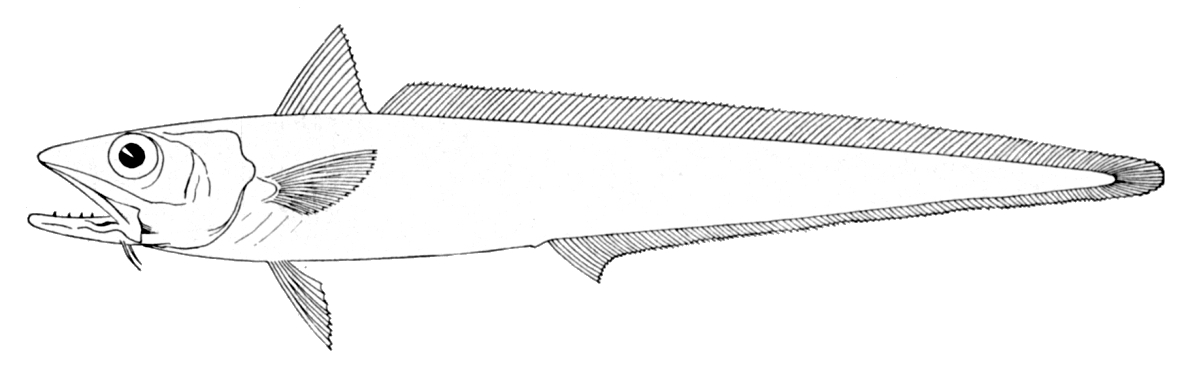
- Blue grenadier (M. novaezelandiae)

Scientific classification
- Kingdom: Animalia
- Phylum: Chordata
- Class: Actinopterygii
- Order: Gadiformes
- Suborder: Macrouroidei
- Family: Macruronidae; Regan, 1903
- Genus: Macruronus; Günther, 1873

Type species
- Coryphaenoides novaezelandiae Hector, 1871

Synonyms
- Cynogadus Howes, 1991

= Macruronus =

Genus of fishes

Macruronus is a genus of gadiform fish, the only member of the family Macruronidae. It was formerly placed in the Merlucciidae. Most are found in southern oceans off Argentina, Chile, South Africa, Australia and New Zealand, but M. maderensis (which is in need of taxonomic review) is only known from Madeira. Members of this genus reach 1–1.3 m (3.3–4.3 ft) in length depending on the exact species involved.

== Species ==
The currently recognized species in this genus are:

- Macruronus capensis D. H. Davies, 1950 (Cape grenadier, South African straptail)
- Macruronus maderensis Maul, 1951
- Macruronus magellanicus Lönnberg, 1907 (Patagonian grenadier)
- Macruronus novaezelandiae (Hector, 1871) (Blue grenadier)

Note that the Catalog of Fishes considers Macruronus capensis and M. magellanicus (following Leslie and colleagues (2018) and others) as junior synonyms of M. novaezelandiae. This leaves the genus with one confirmed species and one with uncertain status.
