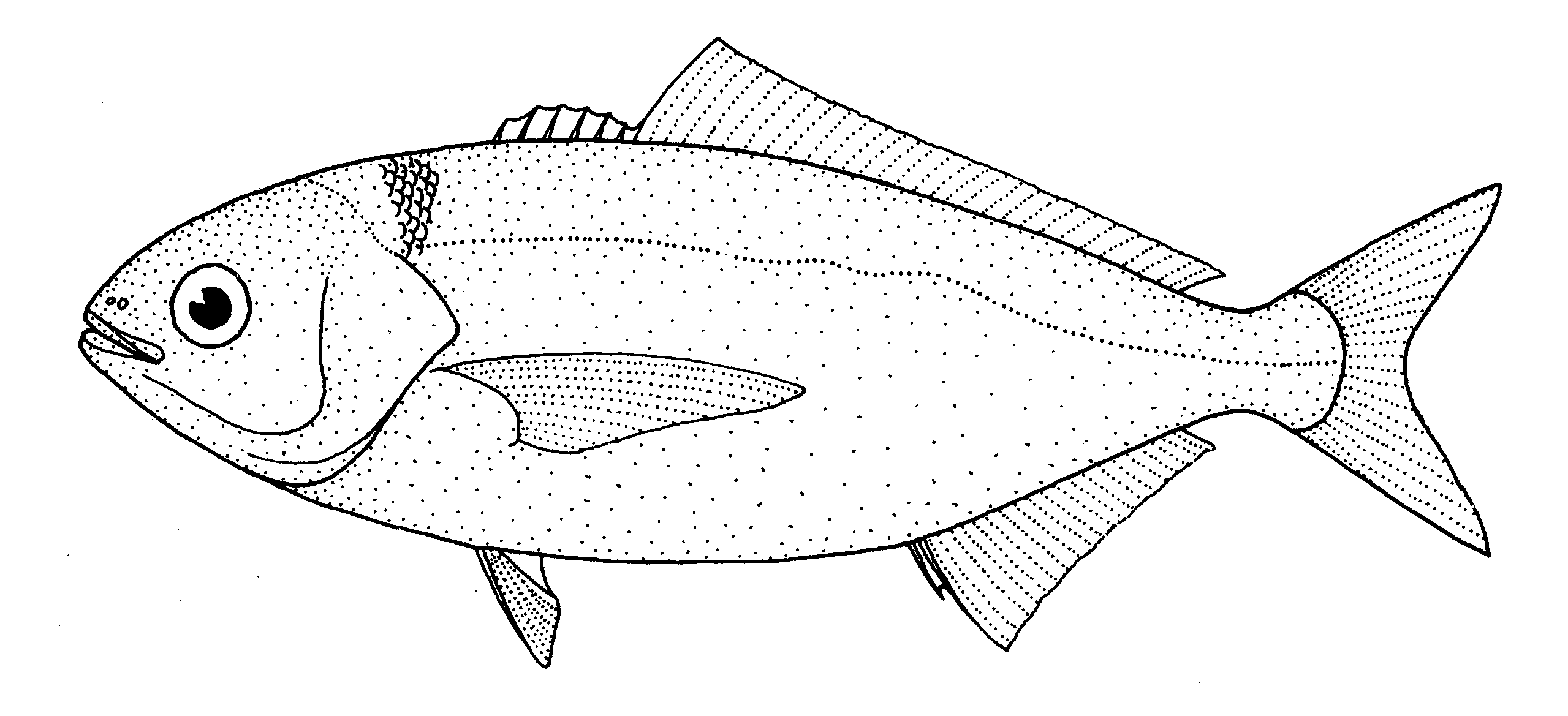
- White warehou (S. caerulea)

Scientific classification
- Kingdom: Animalia
- Phylum: Chordata
- Class: Actinopterygii
- Order: Scombriformes
- Family: Centrolophidae
- Genus: Seriolella; Guichenot, 1848

Type species
- Seriolella porosa Guichenot, 1848

Synonyms
- Neptomenus Günther, 1860

= Seriolella =

Genus of ray-finned fishes

Seriolella is a genus of medusafishes native to the southwestern Pacific Ocean and the eastern Indian Ocean.

== Species ==
There are currently six recognized species in this genus:

- Seriolella brama (Günther, 1860) (Blue warehou or common warehou)
- Seriolella caerulea Guichenot, 1848 (White warehou)
- Seriolella porosa Guichenot, 1848 (Choicy ruff)
- Seriolella punctata (J. R. Forster, 1801) (Silver warehou)
- Seriolella tinro Gavrilov, 1973
- Seriolella violacea Guichenot, 1848 (Palm ruff)
