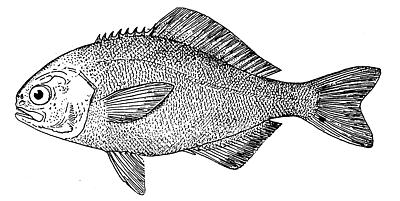
- Barrelfish (H. perciformis)
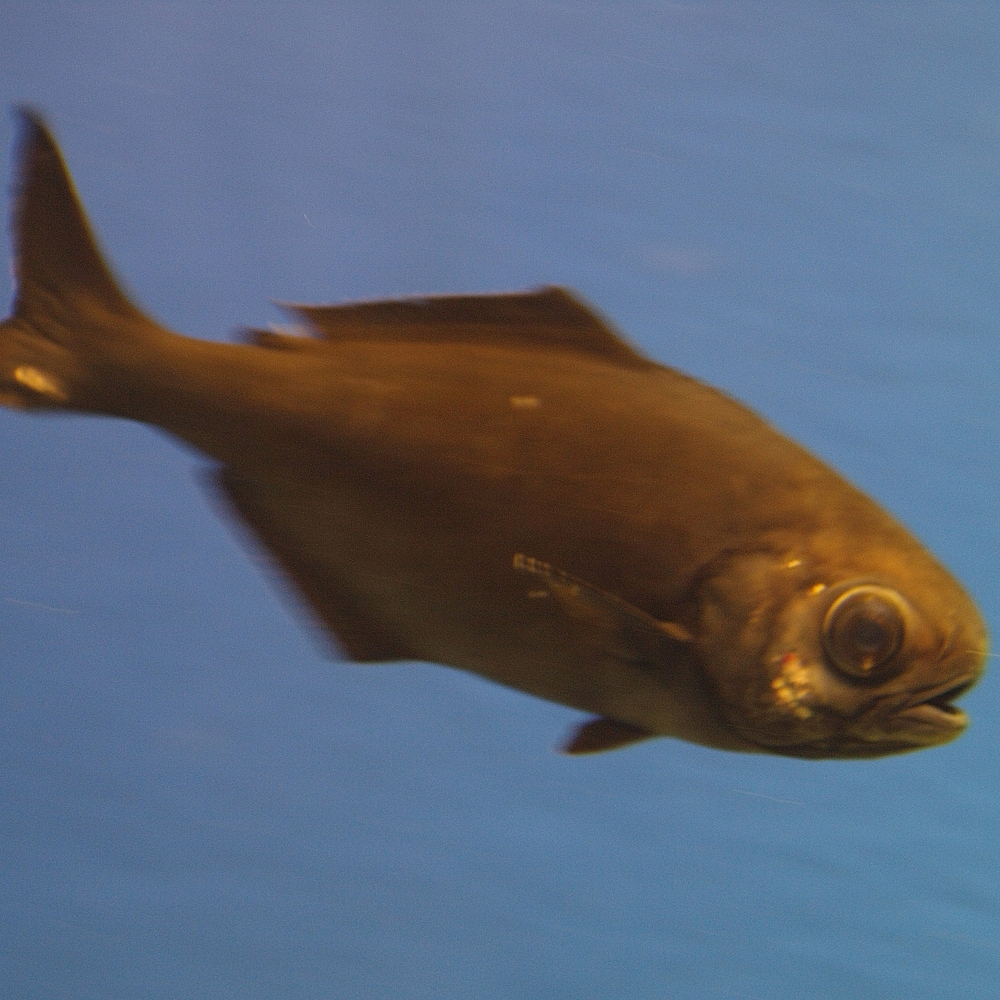
- Pacific barrelfish (H. japonica)

Scientific classification
- Kingdom: Animalia
- Phylum: Chordata
- Class: Actinopterygii
- Order: Scombriformes
- Family: Centrolophidae
- Genus: Hyperoglyphe; Günther, 1859

Type species
- Diagramma porosa J. Richardson, 1845

Synonyms
- Eurumetopos Morton, 1888; Ocycrius Jordan & Hubbs, 1925; Palinurichthys Bleeker, 1859; Pammelas Günther, 1860; Toledia Miranda-Ribeiro, 1915

= Hyperoglyphe =

Genus of ray-finned fishes

Hyperoglyphe is a genus of medusafishes native to the Atlantic and Pacific oceans.

== Species ==
There are currently six recognized species in this genus:

- Hyperoglyphe antarctica (Carmichael, 1819) (Bluenose warehou)
- Hyperoglyphe bythites (Ginsburg, 1954) (Black driftfish)
- Hyperoglyphe japonica (Döderlein (de), 1884) (Pacific barrelfish)
- Hyperoglyphe macrophthalma (A. Miranda-Ribeiro, 1915)
- Hyperoglyphe perciformis (Mitchill, 1818) (Barrelfish)
- Hyperoglyphe pringlei (J. L. B. Smith, 1949) (Black butterfish)
