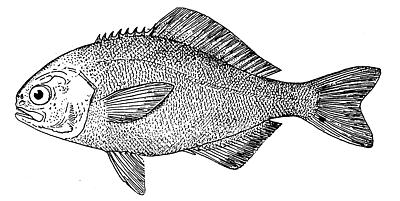

Conservation status
- Least Concern (IUCN 3.1)

Scientific classification
- Kingdom: Animalia
- Phylum: Chordata
- Class: Actinopterygii
- Division: Teleostei
- Order: Scombriformes
- Family: Centrolophidae
- Genus: Hyperoglyphe
- Species: H. perciformis

Binomial name
- Hyperoglyphe perciformis (Mitchill, 1818)

= Hyperoglyphe perciformis =

Barrelfish

Species of fish

Hyperoglyphe perciformis, the barrelfish is a primarily bathypelagic species of ray-finned fish belonging to the family Centrolophidae. The barrelfish is found in the Northern Atlantic Ocean. Despite being in the medusafish family, the barrelfish does not associate with jellyfish or other medusae. It is considered a deep-water gamefish.

== Description ==
The barrelfish primarily has a brown to black coloration on their back, fading to gray on the sides of the body. The dorsal fin normally has 8 spines, and 20 to 22 soft rays. Barrelfish are relatively deep bodied, and have large eyes adapted for sight in the bathypelagic zone. Younger barrelfish have smaller eyes compared to adults, as they do not inhabit deeper water until they grow larger. The young barrelfish found in the upper water columns are often no larger than 1 ft (30 cm), but adults can grow up to 3 ft (91 cm) in length and weigh up to 27 lb (12 kg).

== Distribution ==
The native range of barrelfish includes the subtropical and temperate waters of the Northern Atlantic Ocean, where they are heavily associated with the deeper waters of the Gulf Stream and the Gulf of Mexico. In North America, barrelfish range from Nova Scotia, to the Florida Keys. In Europe, their range is more restricted, being found from Ireland to Portugal.

== Habitat and biology ==
Young barrelfish inhabit all levels of the water column, and have a habit of examining any floating object which crosses their path. It is irrelevant whether the item is a natural object such as a log, or man-made flotsam such as barrels, which is where the name "barrelfish" originated from. Adults are more frequently found in deep water over the continental slopes, appearing first around 300 ft (91 m) and being found down to at least 1,200 ft (370 m). Barrelfish are occasionally found in the same environment as groupers, deep-water snappers, and tilefishes. The diet of the barrelfish consists of crustaceans, molluscs, and fish.

== Uses ==
Barrelfish are of minor commercial importance but are not often targeted by commercial fishermen due to the inability to find them consistently. They are often caught as bycatch in the swordfish, deep-water grouper and snapper fisheries. Recreational anglers also occasionally catch barrelfish whilst deep dropping for snappers and groupers, or fishing for swordfish. The meat is of high quality, with a mild flavor. Barrelfish can be prepared and cooked in a variety of fashions and reportedly freezes well. Some anglers consider them trash fish, as they have a thick slime coating and are caught as bycatch.

== Conservation ==
While considered an uncommon fish, the barrelfish is not considered rare. It is listed as species of least concern, as it is difficult to target with any consistency.

== Gallery ==
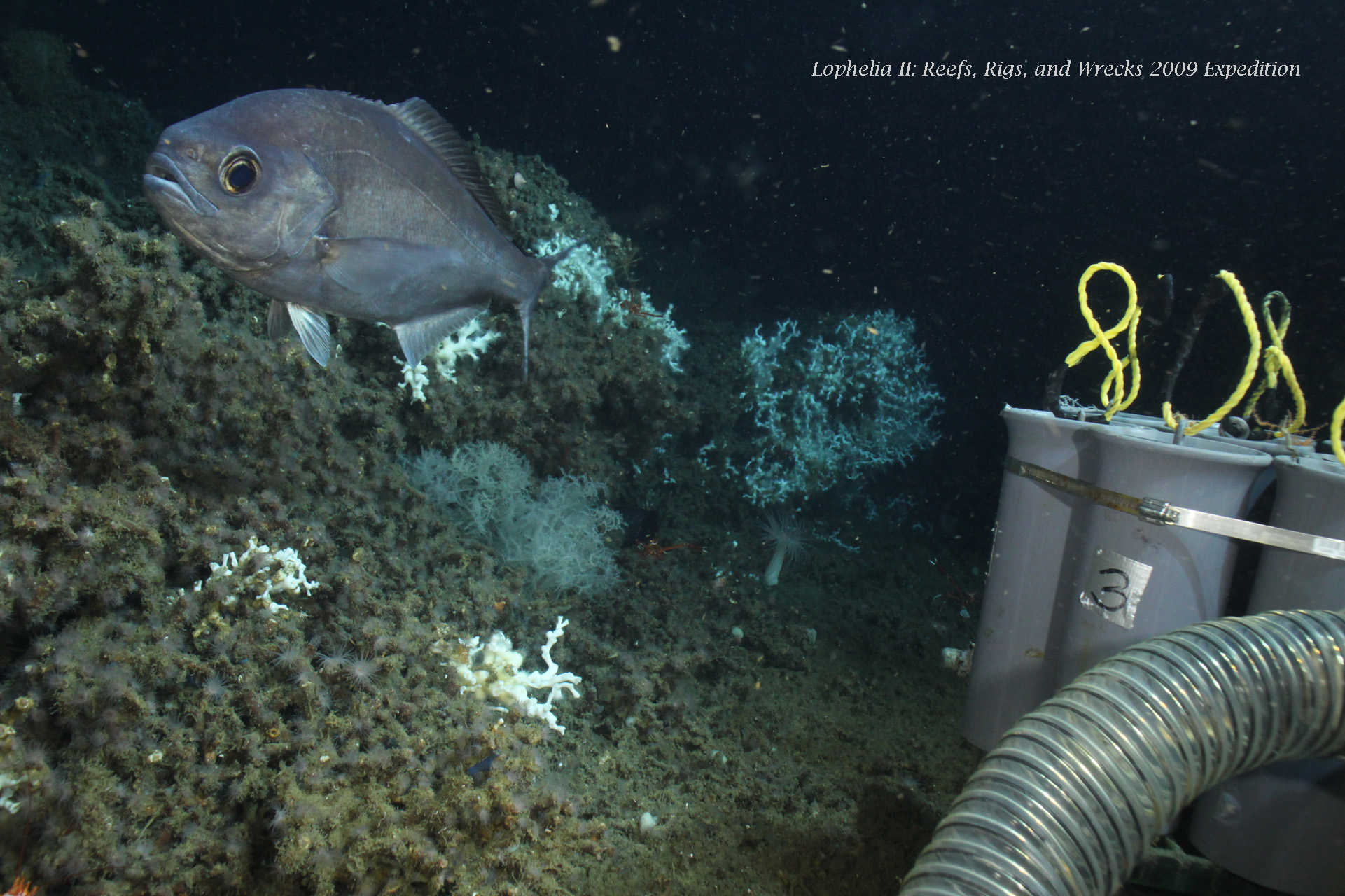
A barrelfish seen on a deep-sea lophelia coral reef.

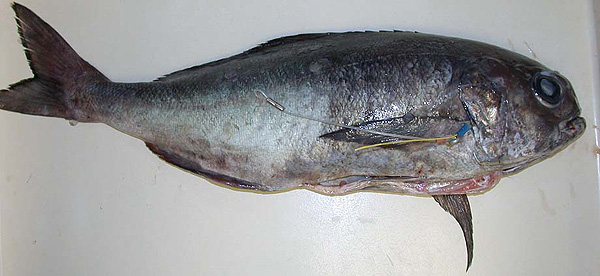
A fresh-caught and gutted barrelfish.
