= Exclusive economic zone of New Zealand =

Overview of New Zealand EEZ

New Zealand's exclusive economic zone (EEZ) covers at least 4,083,744 square kilometres (1,576,742 sq mi), which is approximately 15 times the land area of the country. Sources vary significantly on the size of New Zealand's EEZ; for example, a recent government publication gave the area as roughly 4,300,000 km^{2}. These figures are for the EEZ of New Zealand proper, and do not include the EEZs of other associated states and territories in the Realm of New Zealand (the Cook Islands, Niue, the Ross Dependency, and Tokelau).

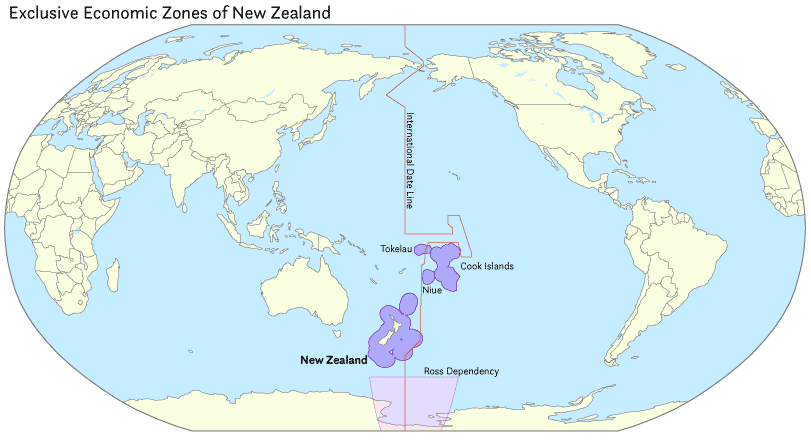
Exclusive economic zones of the Realm of New Zealand, including the Ross Dependency (shaded).

== See also ==
- Australia–New Zealand Maritime Treaty
- Coastline of New Zealand
