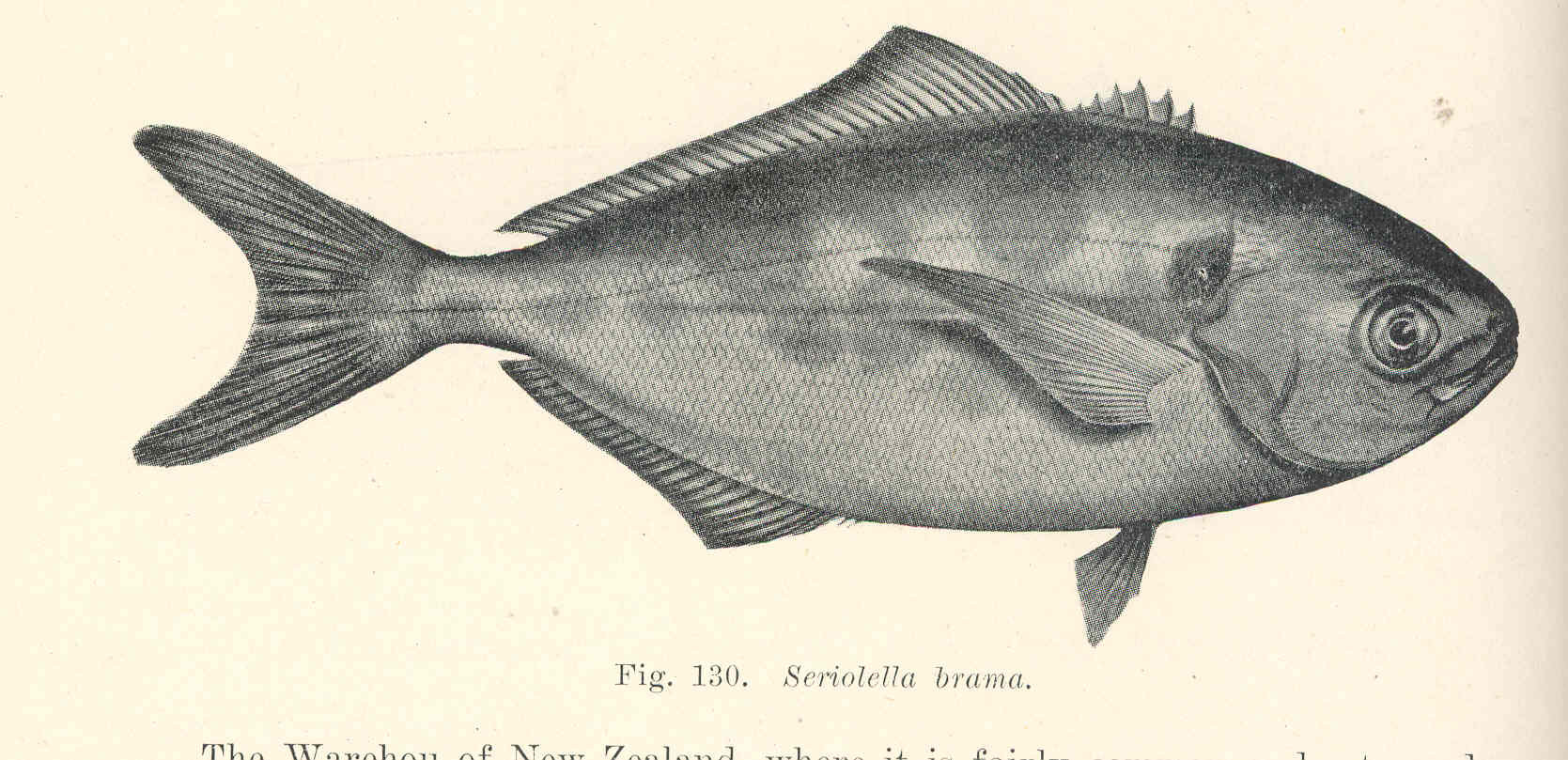

Scientific classification
- Kingdom: Animalia
- Phylum: Chordata
- Class: Actinopterygii
- Order: Scombriformes
- Family: Centrolophidae
- Genus: Seriolella
- Species: S. brama

Binomial name
- Seriolella brama (Günther, 1860)

Synonyms
- Neptomenus brama Günther, 1860

= Blue warehou =

Species of ray-finned fish

The blue warehou (Seriolella brama) or common warehou is a medusafish of the family Centrolophidae found off southern Australia and around New Zealand, at depths of between 5 m and 400 m. Its length is up to about 75 cm.

The blue warehou is not to be confused with the bluenose warehou (usually referred to simply as bluenose in New Zealand, and bonita, big-eye or Griffin's silverfish by others), which is a deepwater member of the warehou family.
