= Aquaculture in New Zealand =

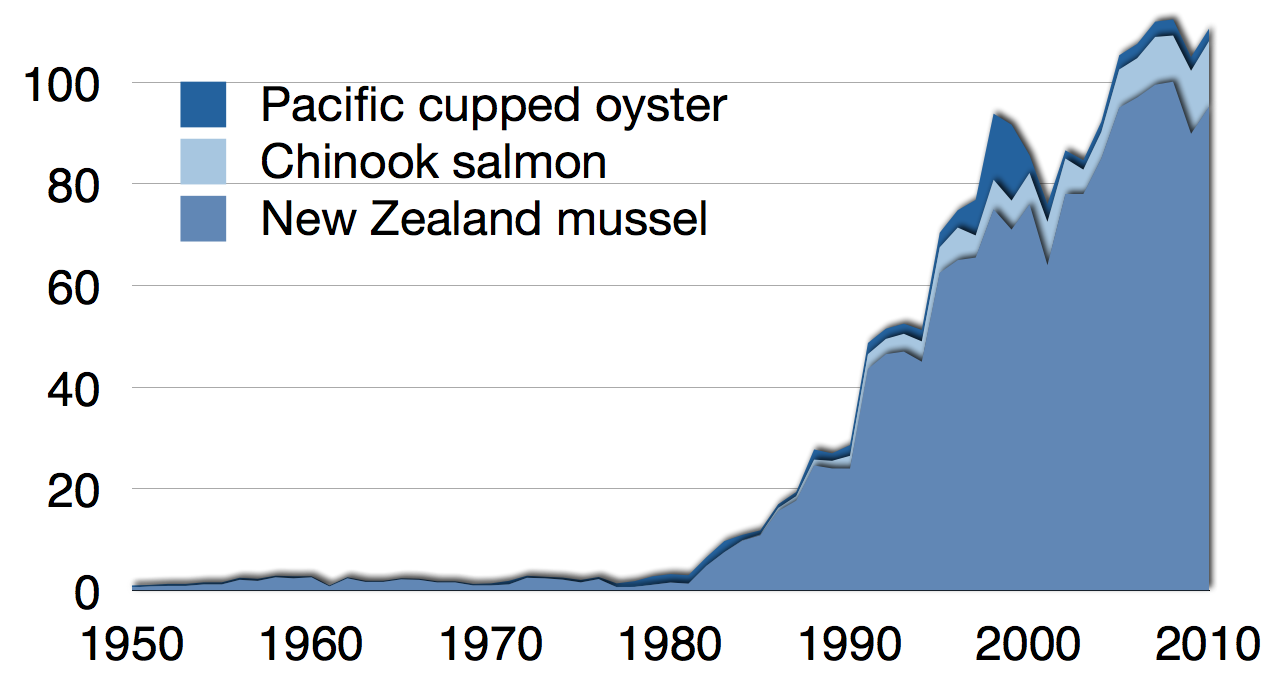
Production in thousand tonnes of the principal aquaculture species, as reported by the FAO, 1950–2009

Aquaculture started to take off in New Zealand in the 1980s. It is dominated by mussels, oysters and salmon. In 2007, aquaculture generated about NZ$360 million in sales on an area of 7,700 hectares. $240 million was earned in exports.

In 2006, the aquaculture industry in New Zealand developed a strategy aimed at achieving a sustainable annual billion NZ dollar business by 2025. In 2007, the government reacted by offering more support to the growing industry. Aquaculture in New Zealand is being affected by climate change through effects such as ocean acidification and marine heatwaves.

== Overview ==
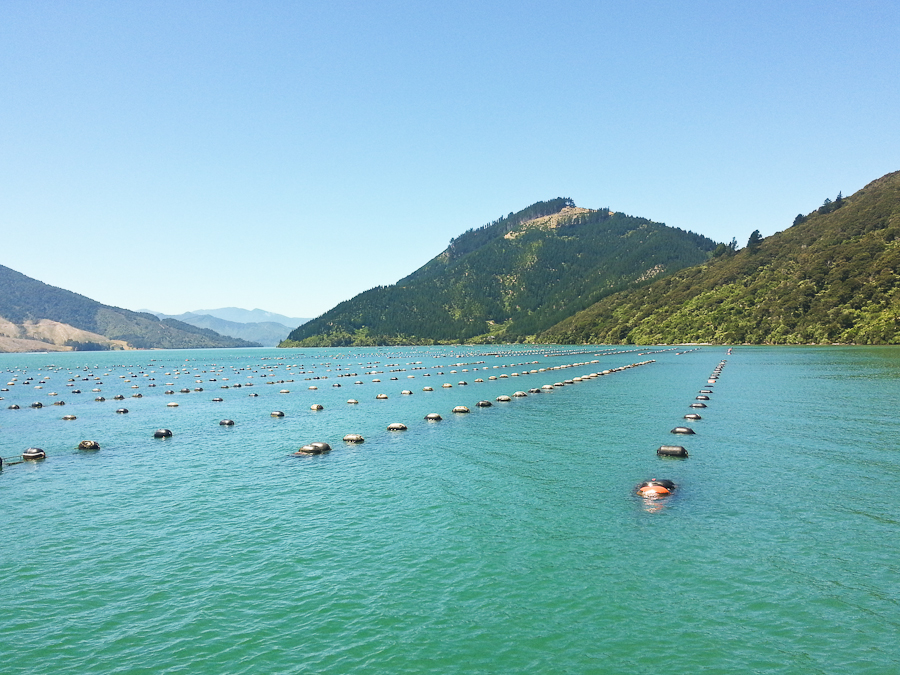
Mussel farm, New Zealand

External images
- Map of aquaculture areas in New Zealand
- Aquaculture production in tonnes, 1950–2006

Aquaculture is the general term given to the cultivation of any fresh or saltwater plant or animal. It takes place in New Zealand in coastal marine areas (mariculture) and in inland tanks or enclosures.

Aquaculture in New Zealand currently (2008) occupies 14,188 ha. Of that area, 7,713 ha is in established growing areas and is owned by the aquaculture industry, 4,010 ha is used to enhance the wild scallop fishery and belongs to the Challenger Scallop Enhancement Company, and 2,465 ha is an exposed site six kilometres offshore from Napier where trials are being undertaken by a private company to test the site's economic viability.

In 2005 the aquaculture industry provided direct employment for about 2,500 full-time equivalents, mostly in the processing sector. A similar amount of indirect employment resulted from flow-on effects. The aquaculture industry is important for some coastal areas around New Zealand where there is limited employment. This applies particularly to some Māori communities with traditional links to coastal settlements.

Marine aquaculture, and mariculture, occurs in the sea, generally in sheltered bays along the coast. In New Zealand, about 70 percent of marine aquaculture occurs in the top of the South Island. In the North Island, the Firth of Thames is productive.

== Cultured species ==
There are three main species in the New Zealand aquaculture industry: the green-lipped mussel, the Pacific oyster and king salmon. In 2006 these three species generated $357 million in sales. Mussel accounted for 63 percent of this value, Pacific oysters 9 percent and king salmon 28 percent.

Value of farmed species in 2006 (NZ$ million)
Common name	Scientific name	Domestic	Export	Total
Green lipped mussel	Perna canaliculus	43	181	224
Pacific oyster	Crassostrea gigas	14	18	32
King salmon	Oncorhynchus tshawytscha	59	42	101
Totals		116	241	357

Locality of farmed species, 2005
Species	Farms (number)	Area (ha)	Production (tonnes)	Locality
Green lipped mussel	550	4500		Particularly the top of the South Island, Pelorus Sound / Te Hoises, Tasman and Golden bays; but also the Hauraki Gulf and Coromandel, with a small number around Banks Peninsula and Stewart Island.
Pacific oyster	236	928		North coast of the North Island: Coromandel, Bay of Islands and the Whangaroa, Mahurangi and Kaipara Harbours.
King salmon	29	128	7,400	Mostly Marlborough Sounds and around Stewart Island, but also in channels below hydroelectric dams in the Mackenzie Basin.

Over two-thirds of New Zealand's aquaculture product comes from mussels and oysters. These shellfish are cultivated in two distinct stages; first spat needs to be collected, then the spat is grown in a grow-out facility.

- Spat, also called seed, is the free-swimming larval stage of a shellfish. Spat is cultured in hatcheries, and can be grown in tanks on land. Hatcheries can also be associated with research facilities where spat can be selectively bred to specifications, as broodstock.
- A grow-out facility is the place where the spat are raised to market size, usually in enclosures anchored in coastal waters.

=== Mussels ===
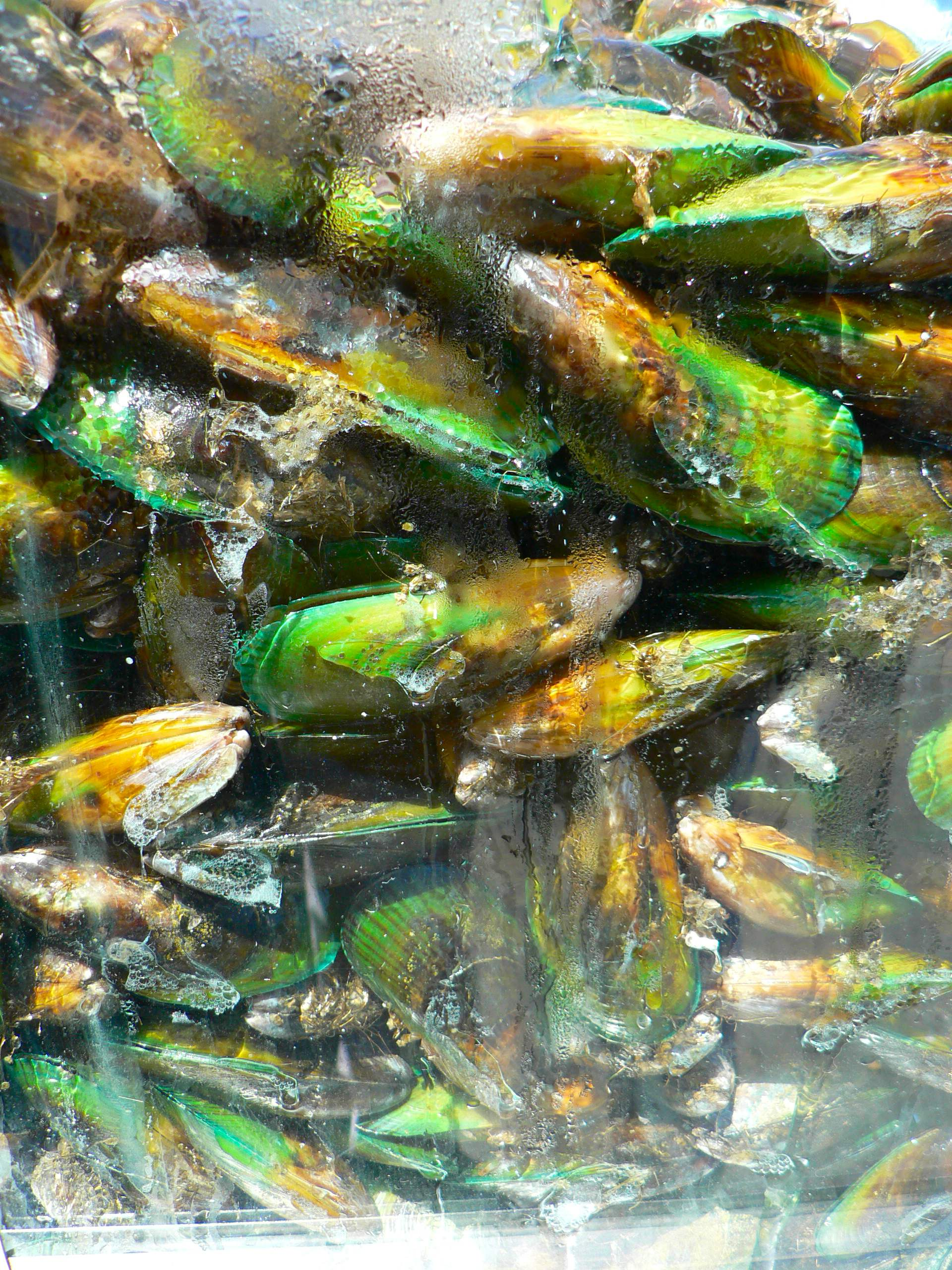
Green lipped mussel in a tank

Until the early 1960s, mussels were harvested by hand from intertidal rocks. Dredging was then introduced, and within a few years the mussel beds in Tasman Bay / Te Tai-o-Aorere and the Hauraki Gulf were dredged clean. In the late 1960s, following this collapse, the aquaculture of the New Zealand mussel began. The endemic green lipped mussel was used to trial growing mussel spat (young mussels) on ropes suspended from rafts. The Hauraki Gulf and the Marlborough Sounds provided sheltered environments, with clean water rich in plankton. The cultured mussels were ready for harvest after 12 to 18 months, and first went on sale in 1971.

More growers entered the industry. The labour-intensive raft method was replaced with a modified Japanese longline system. Biodegradable stockings were packed with spat and tied to parallel rows of looped ropes, supported by buoys. Young mussels grow through the stockings, anchoring themselves to the ropes with their strong byssal threads (beards). The farms are usually located in sheltered or semi-sheltered areas where there is sufficient depth of water at low tide to keep the longline droppers off the bottom. Recent research has been investigating offshore mussel farming in exposed areas several kilometres from shore, such as farms offshore from Napier and Ōpōtiki.

Initially the ropes were allowed to reseed naturally, after harvest, from the spat already present in coastal waters. However, this method was unreliable. In 1974 a marine scientist discovered mussel spat encrusted on drift kelp on Ninety Mile Beach. Locals collected the seaweed and air freighted it to mussel farmers. Kaitaia spat, as it became known, is now the prime source of seed mussels. There are some experimental hatcheries.

Improved techniques have led to rapid production increases, and bulk handling methods have been introduced to meet growing demand for export to more than 60 countries. By 2006 there were over 900 mussel farms in New Zealand covering about 6500 hectares, and worth about $224 million in annual sales. About $180 million were exports, usually sold as frozen mussels in half shells, patented with the trade name NZ Greenshell Mussels.

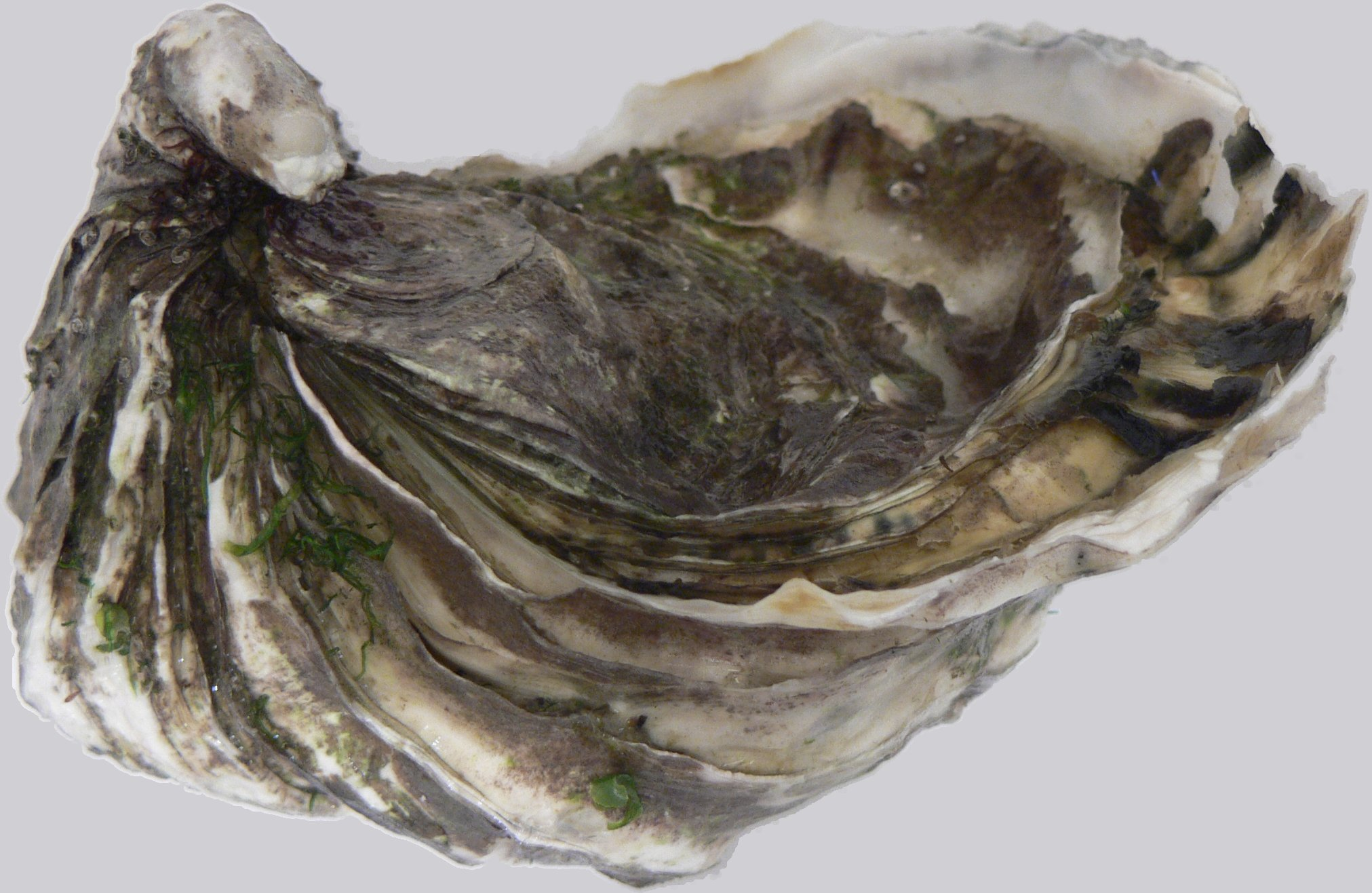
Pacific oyster

=== Oysters ===
There are two types of wild oysters in New Zealand, Bluff oysters and rock oysters. Both have been commercially harvested since the mid-19th century. Bluff oysters have never been cultivated, but various attempts were made to cultivate the rock oyster.

Rock oysters are found naturally in the intertidal zone in the north of the North Island, and were subject to early cultivation experiments. During the 1960s, commercial farmers grew rock oysters on sticks coated with cement, and laid in racks in the lower intertidal regions of harbours and inlets around the northern North Island.

Then in 1970 another oyster started outgrowing the native rock oyster. This newcomer was the Pacific oyster, which had probably been introduced into New Zealand waters in the 1950s from a Japanese vessel hull or in their ballast water. At first, farmers tried to remove it from their collecting sticks, but year by year Pacific oyster spat increased, out-competing the native rock oyster.

Commercial growers began to cultivate the Pacific oyster, and by the mid-1970s, it had become the main farm-raised oyster. Pacific oysters have well-established international markets, grow three times faster than native rock oysters, reach a larger size, have several spawnings each year and produce more consistent quantities of spat.

In 1977 Pacific oysters appeared in the Marlborough Sounds, and farming began there in the 1990s. Instead of using the North Island method of cultivating oysters on racks, Marlborough farmers used hanging longlines, a system developed in Australia.

By 2006 there were over 230 oyster farms in New Zealand using over 900 hectares, and worth about $32 million in annual sales. About $18 million were exports.

Hatchery reared seed is not suitable for the rack systems which are still used by much of the industry. Pacific oysters on these racks are cultured from wild spat, most of which is gathered in the Kaipara Harbour. However, other systems are increasingly being used, including hanging longlines and plastic trays. The Cawthron Institute is the main provider of hatchery spat, and can selectively breed spat to specifications.

=== Salmon ===
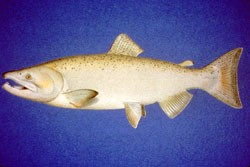
King salmon (Chinook)

Around 1900, different salmon were introduced as sport fish. Only the king salmon (Chinook) adapted to the environment. For decades, the development of salmon and trout aquaculture in New Zealand was opposed by recreational fishers, on the grounds that disease would spread from fish farms into recreational fisheries, and that wild fish would be poached if they could be sold. In 1973 the government compromised by making trout farms illegal, but salmon farms legal. New Zealand is probably the only country in the world where trout farming is illegal, despite commercial interest from companies already farming salmon.

In 1976, the first salmon farm was established at Pupu Springs near Tākaka. Salmon were raised in fresh water, growing to 25 centimetres over two years. The venture was originally aimed at ocean ranching, where juvenile salmon would be released into the sea with the expectation that some would return as adults. But few did return, so the Pupu Springs facility was converted to a hatchery, supplying stock to sea farms.

In 1983, the first sea-cage salmon farm was established in Big Glory Bay, Stewart Island. It was followed by farms in the Marlborough Sounds and at Akaroa Harbour on Banks Peninsula. These areas accounted for over 90 percent of the 8,500 tonnes of salmon produced in 2001.

Today, New Zealand accounts for over half of the world production of king salmon (7,400 tonnes in 2005).

Farming in the sea (mariculture) for king salmon is sometimes called sea-cage ranching. Sea-cage ranching takes place in large floating net cages, about 25 metres across and 15 metres deep, moored to the sea floor in clean, fast-flowing coastal waters. Smolt (young fish) from freshwater hatcheries are transferred to cages containing several thousand salmon, and remain there for the rest of their life. They are fed fishmeal pellets high in protein and oil. Most of this fishmeal is imported from Australia. The salmon are harvested when they are about two years old, weighing 2.5 to 4 kilograms. Sea cages are located in the Marlborough Sounds, Akaroa Harbour and Stewart Island.

Farming in freshwater for king salmon uses net cages placed in rivers, using techniques similar to those used for sea-farmed salmon. Freshwater raceways are located in several Canterbury rivers such as the Clutha and Waimakariri Rivers. In the 1990s, a unique form of freshwater salmon farming was developed in hydroelectric canals in the Mackenzie Basin. Young salmon are enclosed in pens in the Ōhau and Tekapo canals. The Tekapo site, fed by fast cold waters from the Southern Alps, is the highest salmon farm in the world, 677 metres above sea level.

Before they are killed, cage salmon are anaesthetised with a herbal extract. They are then spiked in the brain. The heart beats for a time as the animal is bled from its sliced gills. Relaxing the salmon like this when it is killed produces firm, long-keeping flesh. Lack of disease in wild populations and low stocking densities used in the cages means that New Zealand salmon farmers do not use antibiotics and chemicals that are often needed elsewhere.

The New Zealand industry has grown into the largest producers of farmed king salmon in the world, accounting for about half of world production. The New Zealand King Salmon Company, dominates the production of king salmon in New Zealand. The company has its own selective breeding programmes integrated with quality control and production. Other salmon producers rely on stock from hatcheries where selective breeding is less well developed.

=== Other species ===
- The culture of ornamental cold water species, such as goldfish, are valued at about $18 million.
- A small-scale freshwater prawn farm was established in 1991 at Wairakei, near Taupō, producing tropical giant river prawns. Heat from a geothermal source is used to heat water in prawn-rearing ponds (see geothermal energy and aquaculture).
- Commercial seaweed cultivation is an emerging sector in New Zealand aquaculture. Asparagopsis Technologies is one such example, operating a land-based farming facility at the Ocean Beach Aquaculture Park in Southland, cultivating Asparagopsis armata (red seaweed) to produce low-emissions livestock feed additives.

Other species which have potential, but are currently small-scale or are still in research or pre-commercial stages, are discussed under Prospects below.

== Scallop enhancement ==
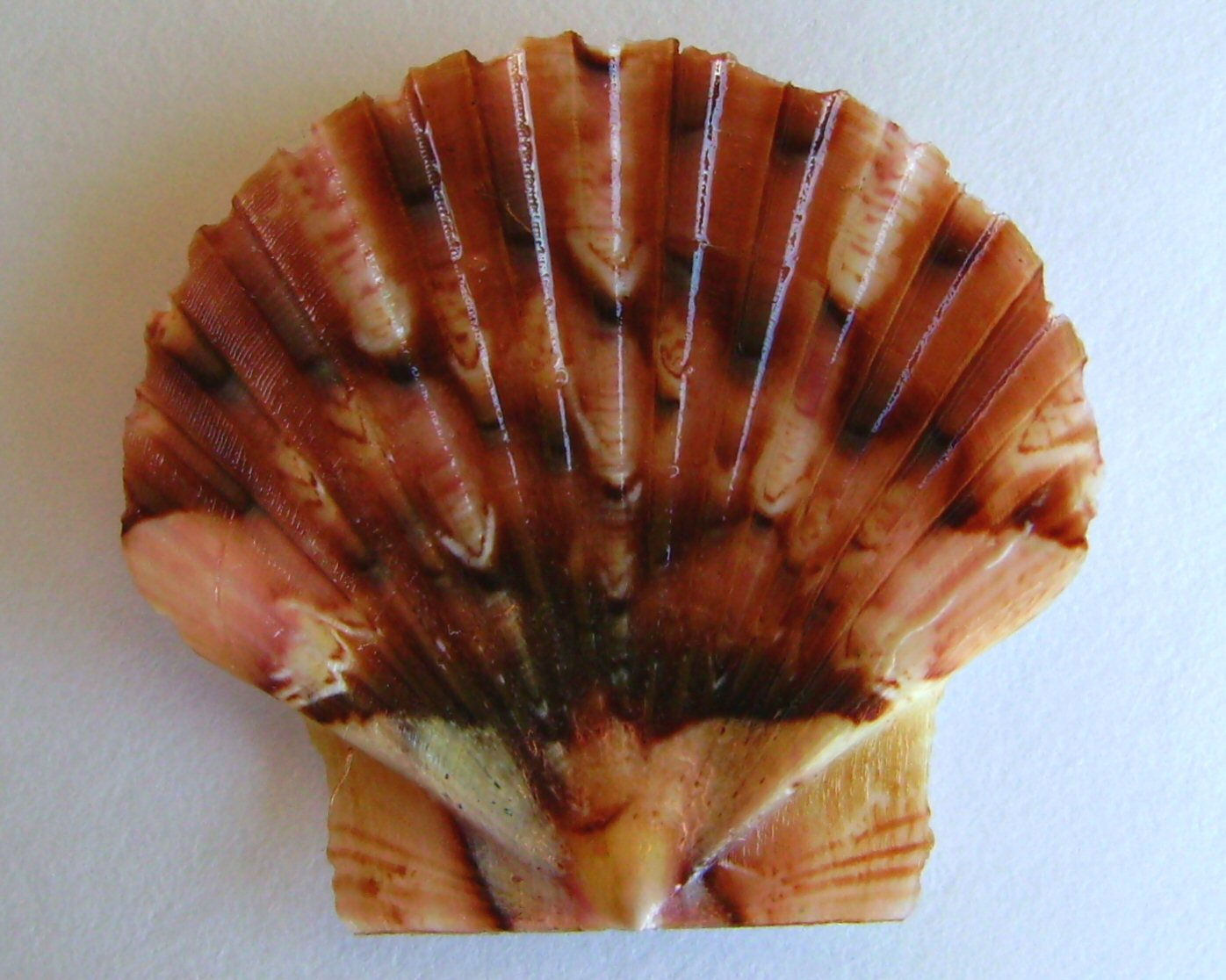
A young New Zealand scallop

Enhancement is the name given to techniques designed to boost the natural recruitment or survival of young animals or seaweed in the wild. In New Zealand, scallop enhancement has worked well in Tasman Bay / Te Tai-o-Aorere and Golden Bay.

The New Zealand scallop is a large fan-shaped shellfish, flat on one side and convex on the other. It lives on the bottom of coastal waters from low tide level to over 90 metres deep, though typically from 10 to 25 metres deep. Scallop spat-collecting bags are suspended during summer in coastal areas with high natural scallop settlement. The scallop larvae settle out of the plankton onto the fine feathery surface of the plastic mesh bags. The larvae are allowed to grow to a suitable size and are then released onto known natural scallop beds at densities of about six per square metre of sea floor. There, they are later harvested on a rotational basis by dredges. This technique has resulted in a marked increase and stabilising of the available annual catch. The Tasman scallop fishery, near collapse in the 1980s, recovered with re-seeding to a level where 747 tonnes were harvested in 2004.

== Climate change ==
Climate change is affecting fish stocks and the fishing and aquaculture industries in New Zealand, through marine heatwaves, higher average water temperatures, and ocean acidification. Effects include changes in fish ranges, warmer water temperatures changing the suitability of areas for aquaculture, loss of habitat species, and loss of species from some areas when a species cannot adapt to higher temperatures.

== Legislation and administration ==
Marine farmers usually look for sheltered and unpolluted waters rich in nutrients. Often these areas are also desirable for other purposes. In the late 1990s, demand for coastal aquaculture space upsurged, increasing fivefold. Aquaculture consents developed haphazardly, with regional councils unsure about how marine farms might impact coastal environments. By 2001, some councils were inundated with marine farm applications, and were operating with inadequate guidelines for sustainably managing the coast. As the Ministry for the Environment put it: "Attempts to minimise local or cumulative environmental effects resulted in bottlenecks, delays and high costs in processing applications for new marine farms, local moratoria, submitter fatigue and poor environmental outcomes. Marine farmers, local communities, and the government wanted change."

In 2002, the government stopped issuing consents for more new marine farms while they reformed the legislation. The consents had operated under a system overseen by both the Ministry of Fisheries and the regional councils. The reforms aimed to streamline these applications for both freshwater and marine farms. Industry farmers objected to the moratorium, on the grounds that delaying expansion and diversification could not be in the interest of the industry. Māori groups considered they were especially affected since they were the main applicants for coastal farms.

This took three years, and in early 2005, Parliament passed the Aquaculture Reform Act 2004, which introduced the new legislation. The act amends five existing acts to cope with the new environmental demands, and creates two new acts, the Māori Commercial Aquaculture Claims Settlement Act 2004 and the Aquaculture Reform (Repeals and Transitional Provisions) Act 2004. The legislation and administration of aquaculture in New Zealand is complex for such a small industry. A more comprehensive overview can be found here.

Aquaculture is administered in New Zealand through labyrinth bureaucracies, with consequent diluted responsibilities. No single ministerial portfolio or government agency is responsible. As an example, in 2007 the government released a strategy on aquaculture. This strategy was endorsed by six government ministers with the following portfolios: fisheries, environment, conservation, local government, Māori affairs, industry and regional development. Further, there were five government departments directly involved in the preparation of the strategy. As another example, the access to marine and freshwater aquaculture sites are under the control of 17 regional local government agencies with yet more oversight by various central government agencies.

Despite many further consultations and incentives, no new aquaculture space was created under the new legislation for another four years. This coincided with a change in government at the end of 2008, which announced that the aquaculture reforms are to be overhauled.

== Training and research ==
In recent years, skill levels in the New Zealand aquaculture industry has considerably improved. This has been largely due to Seafood Industry Training Organization (SITO), an integral part of the seafood industry. SITO have developed tailored aquaculture training programmes based on their prior experience with industry-based training for wild fisheries. They now offer nationally recognised training programmes based on the needs of companies involved in aquaculture.

At the tertiary level, the Auckland University of Technology offers an undergraduate degree in aquaculture. Other tertiary training centres offering aquaculture courses include the Bay of Plenty Polytechnic, the Nelson Marlborough Institute of Technology, and the Mahurangi Technical Institute.

Government funding for aquaculture research is about two percent of the annual sales of the industry. These funds are mostly delivered through a competitive bidding process, organised and controlled by the Foundation for Research, Science and Technology.

- The principal aquaculture research group is the National Institute of Water and Atmospheric Research (NIWA). NIWA is structured as a profit-making private company, though it is owned by the government. It operates three aquaculture research facilities; Bream Bay Aquaculture Park, Mahanga Bay Aquaculture Research Facility and Silverstream Hatchery. The Bream Bay Aquaculture Park includes other private aquaculture companies organised as an industrial-technology park. NIWA produces yellowtail kingfish spat, seed abalone and salmon smolts, which it sells to on-growers.
- The Cawthron Institute is a non-profit organisation which does regional research around Nelson. It operates a nearby saltwater research facility called the Cawthron Aquaculture Park.
- The tertiary education sector undertakes a small amount of aquaculture research. In 2007 an aquaculture centre was opened at Mahurangi Technical Institute in Warkworth. Scientists at the institute are aiming to breed short-fin eels within two years with a goal of producing commercial quantities of eels in captivity, which would be a world first.

== Role of Māori ==
In pre-European times, the indigenous Māori of New Zealand undertook rudimentary aquaculture activities, such as placing suitable rocks into the intertidal settlement zones of oyster larvae. They were also thought to have transplanted abalone and other shellfish between different areas.

Māori currently have a significant presence in the New Zealand aquaculture industry, and this is likely to increase over time as the requirements to allocate aquaculture space through the Māori Commercial Aquaculture Claims Settlement Act 2004 are met. However, inappropriate aquaculture locations and unsustainable practices have the potential to compromise values and resources important to coastal whānau, hapū and iwi.

In 2008, a settlement of $97 million was made to Māori for Crown obligations for aquaculture space that was approved between 1992 and 2004.

NIWA operates a Māori research and development unit, Te Kūwaha o Taihoro Nukurangi. The unit has a team of Māori scientists who undertake research and provide consultancy services, based particularly around iwi with environmental and commercial issues.

== Prospects ==
In 2006, the New Zealand aquaculture industry published The New Zealand Aquaculture Strategy, setting itself an annual sales target of one billion NZ dollars by 2025. The strategy sets out ten areas of activity needed to achieve this target. The New Zealand Aquaculture Council has introduced a levy on aquaculture producers so this strategy can be implemented.

In 2007, the New Zealand government responded to this industry initiative by releasing an aquaculture development strategy highlighting existing actions and proposing new initiatives. In addition, the government has offered additional funding around five key objectives, with the main focus on improving the implementation of the new 2004 regulations. At the end of 2008 there was a change in government, which announced that the aquaculture reforms will be overhauled, but reaffirmed the government commitment to the industry billion dollar target.

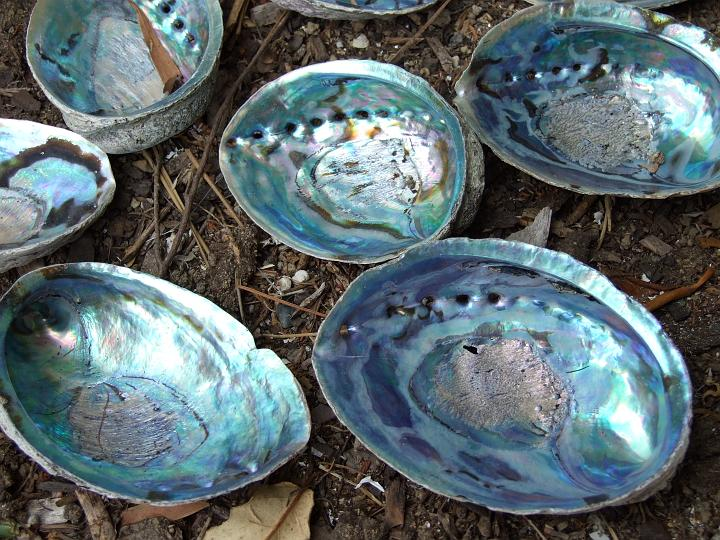
Pāua shells. Pāua is a native form of abalone, and has potential as a high-value species. Many attempts have been made to cultivate pāua, but so far production has been small.

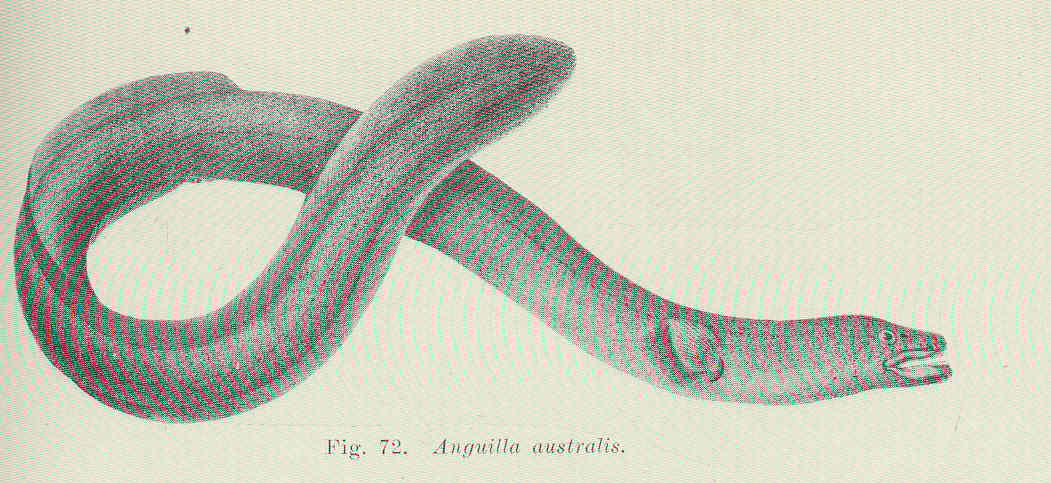
Shortfin eel

The New Zealand industry currently relies on low-value filter-feeding shellfish (mussels and oysters) which are fast growing and relatively easy to culture. There is potential for the industry to diversify into higher value species such as pāua, kingfish and crayfish. These species need special food supplies and are more expensive to farm, but they command higher prices.

- The native blackfoot pāua, Haliotis iris, is a form of abalone. They are large sea snails which survive strong tidal surges by clinging to rocks using their large muscular foot. Wild pāua has been harvested since 1944, usually by skindivers,. Pāua aquaculture started in 1980, but has been slow moving beyond development. They are difficult to grow, and grow more slowly than salmon, mussels or oysters. Their larva and juveniles need to be grown separately. Most pāua farmers get juveniles from hatcheries, and feed them fresh kelp in land-based tanks. In Akaroa Harbour, one farmer grows pāua on plastic barrels tethered to buoys. In 2002, farmers produced five tonnes of pāua meat, worth $400,000.
- Another New Zealand pioneer pāua farmer cultivates blue pearls by placing some grit between the flesh of the pāua and its shell, where it acts as an irritant. The pāua responds by coating the grit with nacre (mother-of-pearl). This develops as a blue pearl.
- For some years there has been research on the best ways of growing the red seaweed, Gigartina atropurpurea, in New Zealand. Seaweed spores are grown on three-metre strings at NIWA's Mahanga Bay aquaculture research facility, and are then transferred to a mussel farm in the Marlborough Sounds. If successful, a new seaweed growing industry could spread to the mussel farms in the Marlborough Sounds.
- Bluff oysters are harvested from the wild in Foveaux Strait. However, they breed more easily in Northland, and NIWA is examining their aquaculture possibilities.
- Shortfin and longfin eels have been trialled by NIWA. Established worldwide markets in cultured eels are worth over US$1 billion, and a decline in some stocks has opened up opportunities for New Zealand.
- The big-bellied seahorse is a native seahorse. Seahorses are valued aquarium fish. They are also used medicinally, particularly in traditional Chinese medicine. Wild seahorses have been over-harvested worldwide, opening markets to their aquaculture.
- A New Zealand sea sponge, Mycale hentscheli, which grows in Pelorus Sound / Te Hoiere, may hold the key to an anti-cancer drug. Scientists are working to see how peloruside, a substance produced by the sponges, might be used as a cancer-fighting drug. Victoria University and NIWA are working with Marlborough marine farmers to develop a method for growing the sponge on an existing mussel farm.

Other prospects which are being researched or trialled include

- European perch
- grass carp
- hāpuku, a native wreckfish
- yellowtail kingfish, a native kingfish
- sea cucumber
- kina, a native sea urchin
- rock lobster
- koura, a native freshwater crayfish
- Spongia manipulatus, a native bath sponge
- giant kelp

== Timeline ==
- Pre-European: The indigenous Māori undertake rudimentary aquaculture activities, such as placing suitable rocks into the intertidal settlement zones of oyster larvae. They are also thought to have transplanted abalone and other shellfish between different areas.
- Early 20th century: Salmon species are introduced to New Zealand as sport fish, but only the Chinook, or king salmon adapts to the environment.
- 1950s: the Pacific oyster is introduced, possibly from a Japanese vessel hull or in their ballast water.
- Early 1960s: Dredge fisheries start operating in the north of the South Island and around the Hauraki Gulf. Within a few years they dredge these areas bare.
- Late 1960s: As a response to the collapse of the dredge fisheries, the aquaculture of New Zealand mussels begins.
- 1970s: Farming of king salmon begins.
- Late 1990s: The aquaculture industry goes through a boom period, and demand for coastal space increases fivefold.
- 2002: The government, in some disarray, imposes a moratorium on new marine farms while they attempt to develop better legislation aimed at dealing with the environmental demands of aquaculture and streamlining applications for marine and freshwater farms.
- 2005: Parliament passes the Aquaculture Reform Act 2004, amending five existing acts so they can better cope with the environmental demands of aquaculture, and creating two new acts. However, the reform fails to streamline applications, and no further allocation of aquaculture space occurs over the next four years.
- 2006: The New Zealand aquaculture industry publishes The New Zealand Aquaculture Strategy, setting itself an annual sales target of one billion NZ dollars by 2025.
- 2007: The New Zealand government responds to the industry initiative by releasing an aquaculture development strategy highlighting existing actions and proposing new initiatives including funding incentives, mainly aimed at trying to action its reform legislation.
- 2008: A settlement of $97 million is made to Māori for Crown obligations for aquaculture space that was approved between 1992 and 2004.
- 2008: The government changes and announces that the aquaculture reforms will be overhauled. It reaffirms the government commitment to the industry billion dollar target.

== See also ==
- Fishing industry in New Zealand
- Agriculture in New Zealand
