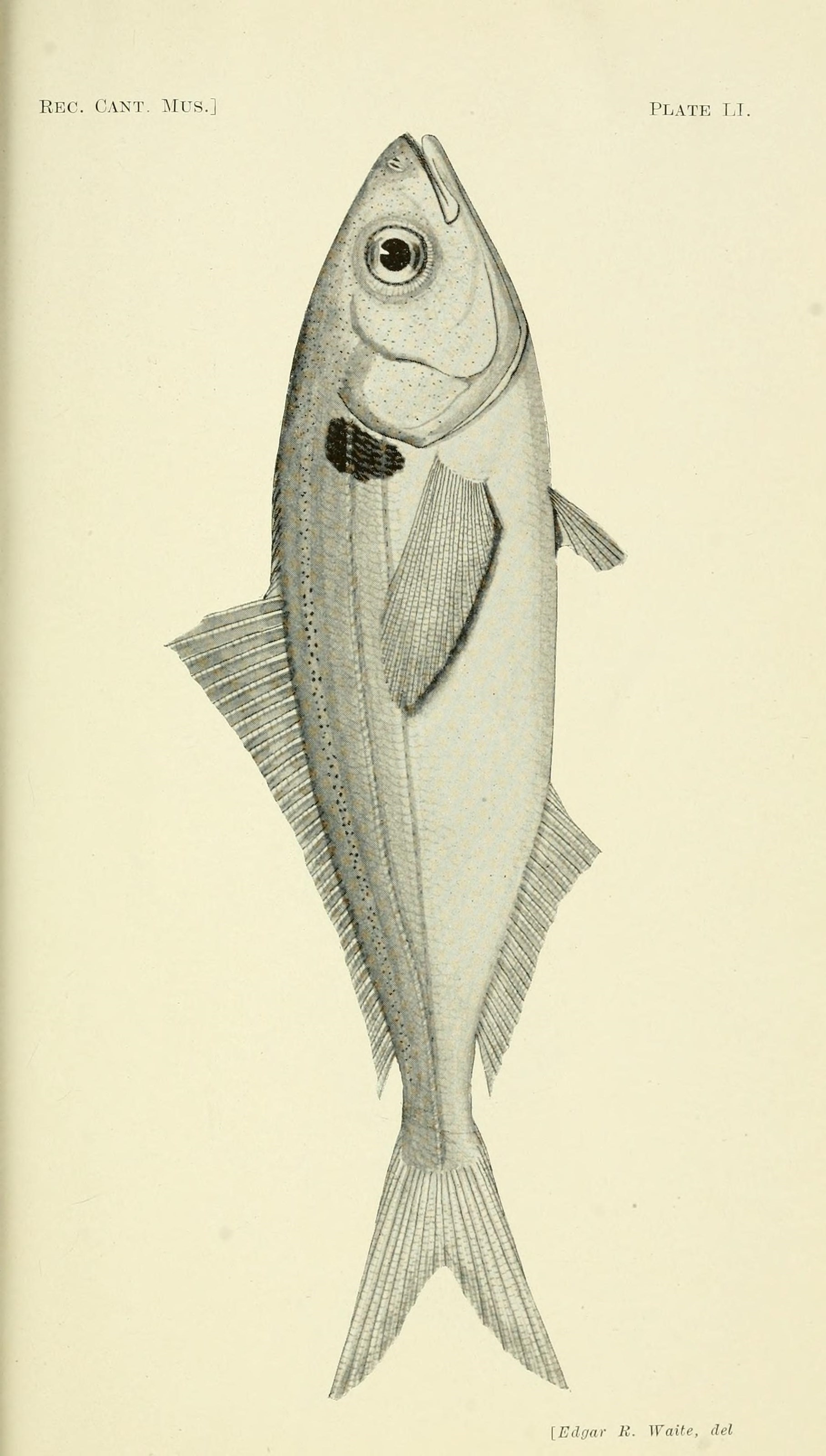

Scientific classification
- Kingdom: Animalia
- Phylum: Chordata
- Class: Actinopterygii
- Division: Teleostei
- Order: Scombriformes
- Family: Centrolophidae
- Genus: Seriolella
- Species: S. punctata

Binomial name
- Seriolella punctata (J. R. Forster, 1801)

Synonyms
- Seriolella maculata (Forster, 1795); Scomber punctatus Forster, 1801; Neptonemus dobula Günther, 1869; Neptonemus travaleCastelnau, 1872

= Silver warehou =

Species of ray-finned fish

The silver warehou, Seriolella punctata, is a medusafish of the family Centrolophidae found in the southern Indian and southern Pacific oceans, at depths of between 100 and 650 m. Its length is up to about 65 cm.
