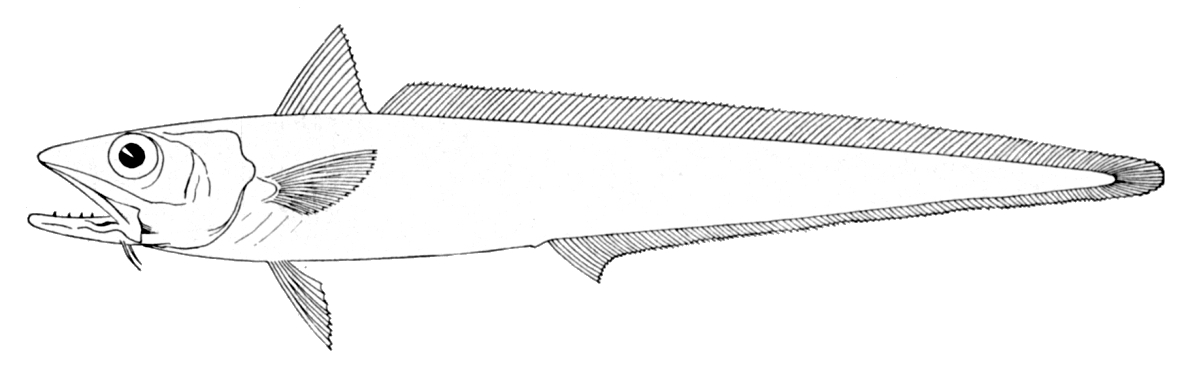

Scientific classification
- Kingdom: Animalia
- Phylum: Chordata
- Class: Actinopterygii
- Division: Teleostei
- Order: Gadiformes
- Family: Macruronidae
- Genus: Macruronus
- Species: M. novaezelandiae

Binomial name
- Macruronus novaezelandiae (Hector, 1871)

Synonyms
- Coryphaenoides novaezelandiae Hector, 1871; Coryphaenoides tasmaniae Johnston, 1883

= Blue grenadier =

Species of fish

The blue grenadier (also known as hoki, blue hake, New Zealand whiptail, or whiptail hake, Macruronus novaezelandiae) is a gadiform fish of the family Macruronidae found around southern Australia and New Zealand, as well as off both the Atlantic and Pacific coasts of South America from Peru to Brazil at depths of between 10 and 1,000 m (33 and 3,300 ft). It feeds in midwater on small squids, crustaceans, and fish. Its length is between 60 and 120 cm (24 and 47 in). It is a slender, silvery fish similar in appearance to the gemfish. The meat of the fish is white and almost always sold in fillets; culinarily it is considered a whitefish.

== Commercial use ==
Australian supermarkets have many hoki products, mainly in pre-packaged processed foods. Often the manufactured meat result is manufactured into a fish cutlet shape and then battered or crumbed to further give a good fresh look.

The hoki is one of the species used in McDonald's Filet-O-Fish, Fish Fingers and McFish sandwiches. It was previously served at Long John Silver's and Denny's restaurants in the United States, and continues to be served at Denny's in New Zealand.

The blue grenadier is a very important commercial species in Australia. They are mostly caught in the south-east, off southern New South Wales, Victoria, Tasmania and South Australia and are considered very good eating, particularly when fresh.

== Sustainable consumption ==
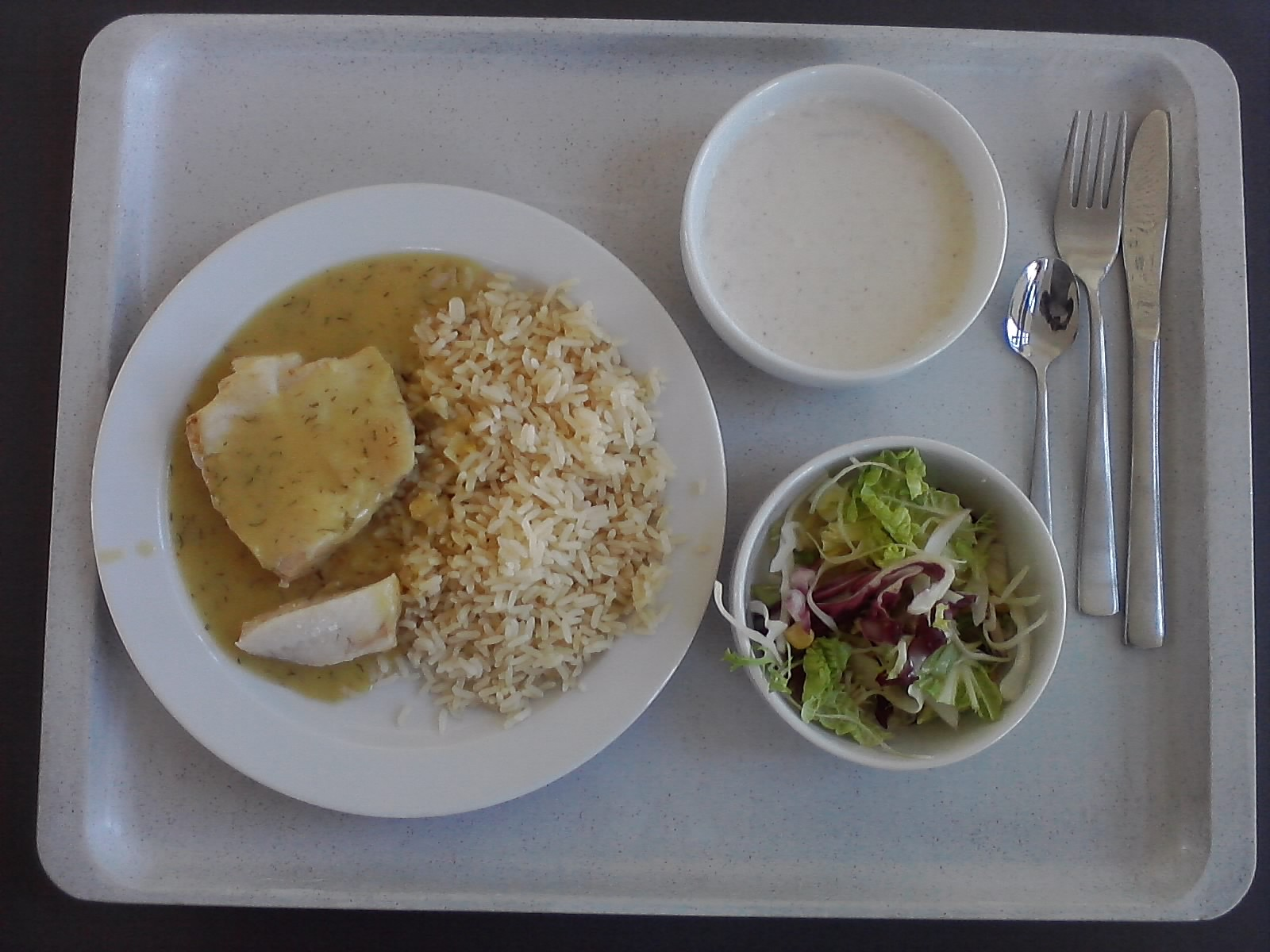
Blue grenadier filet with rice, dill and mustard sauce

The blue grenadier is the subject of a large commercial fishery industry in New Zealand, which has been certified by the Marine Stewardship Council (MSC) as well-managed and sustainable in March 2001. New Zealand has established a fishing quota of about 100,000 tons. The first MSC certification ended in April 2007. Reassessment of the certification commenced in early 2005 and finished in October 2007. A 2009 New York Times article raised questions over the sustainability of blue grenadier fishing practices around New Zealand, though its conclusions were disputed by New Zealand representatives. However, recent quotas on catches have been reduced by nearly two thirds from 275,000 to 100,000 tons.

In 2010, Greenpeace International added the blue grenadier (hoki) to its seafood red list. The Royal Forest and Bird Protection Society of New Zealand (Forest & Bird) assigns hoki an E grade (red - avoid). Both organisations state damage to the sea floor due to bottom trawling and bycatch of species such as New Zealand fur seals, albatrosses, petrels and basking sharks as the primary reasons for the ratings.

In September 2013, as New Zealand Hoki, it continued to appear on the MSC's list of sustainable fish.

== Climate change impacts ==
A Fisheries New Zealand report in 2023 said that the hoki fishery was threatened by climate change due to increasing ocean temperatures, which could cause lower recruitment, and changes in distributions. Other possible effects survival and growth changes due to changes in availability of food caused by shifts in ocean winds and currents.
