= Ministry of Fisheries (New Zealand) =

Former New Zealand ministry

- Te Tautiaki i nga tini a Tangaroa
- Ministry of Fisheries logo

Agency overview
- Formed: 1995
- Dissolved: 2012
- Superseding agency: Ministry for Primary Industries
- Jurisdiction: New Zealand
- Website: www.mpi.govt.nz/travel-and-recreation/fishing/

The Ministry of Fisheries (Māori: Te Tautiaki i nga tini a Tangaroa), also known by its acronym MFish, was a state sector organisation of New Zealand whose role is ensuring the sustainable utilisation of fisheries. It was merged into the Ministry for Primary Industries in April 2012. Its purpose was conserving, using, enhancing and developing New Zealand's fisheries resources.

== History ==
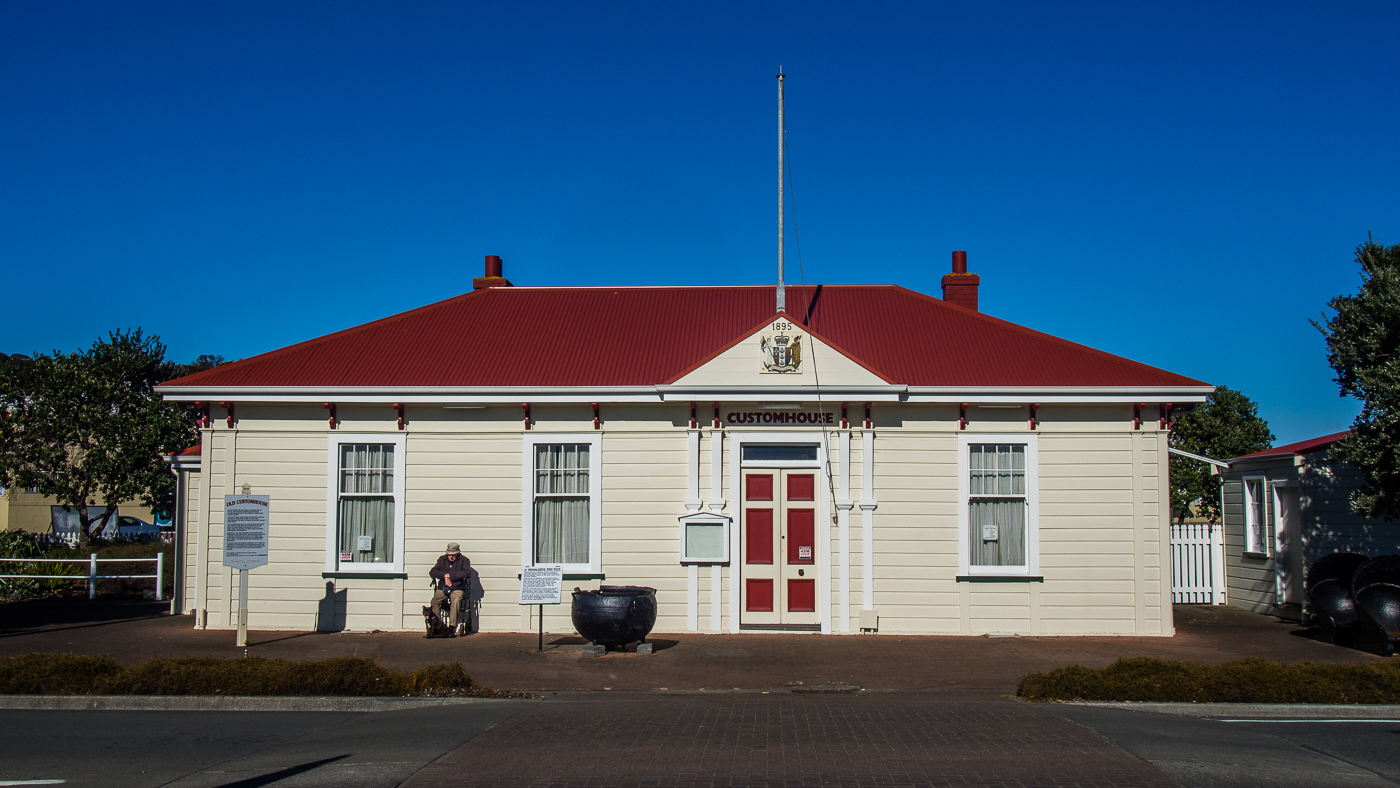
The Ministry of Agriculture and Fisheries used the former Napier Custom House

The Ministry of Fisheries was established as a stand-alone agency in 1995, after a major governmental review of fisheries legislation, as well as ongoing reforms in the New Zealand State Sector. Previously, responsibility for fisheries belonged to New Zealand Ministry of Agriculture and Forestry (MAF), which later became New Zealand's Ministry of Agriculture and Forestry when the Ministry of Forestry merged with the remaining Ministry of Agriculture in 1998. Under the Fifth National Government, the Ministry of Fisheries was merged back into MAF from 1 July 2011, and then into the Ministry for Primary Industries (MPI) in 2012.

The subsequent Labour-led government announced it would break up MPI and re-establish the portfolio of Minister of Fisheries. However, MPI was not disestablished; instead, in 2017, it was restructured with Fisheries New Zealand established as a new business group within the larger agency.

== Responsibilities ==
The Ministry was primarily responsible for fisheries management within New Zealand's 200-nautical-mile (400 km) Exclusive Economic Zone (EEZ). It aimed to ensure that fisheries are sustainably used within a healthy aquatic ecosystem. MFish also undertook fisheries research to provide information needed to determine how many fish and other marine organisms (of various species) could be safely taken while ensuring the sustainability of the resource.

== See also ==
- Aquaculture in New Zealand
- Fishing industry in New Zealand
- Minister of Fisheries (New Zealand)

== Notes ==
1. Budget 2008/09 (excl GST) MFish Facts and Figures.
2. Staff (March 2008)(FTEs) MFish Facts and Figures.
3. Ministry of Fisheries. "Research: Links".
