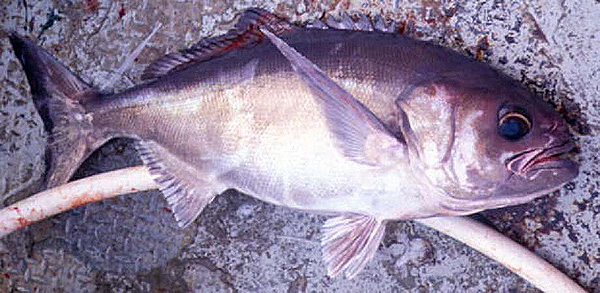

Scientific classification
- Kingdom: Animalia
- Phylum: Chordata
- Class: Actinopterygii
- Order: Scombriformes
- Family: Centrolophidae
- Genus: Hyperoglyphe
- Species: H. antarctica

Binomial name
- Hyperoglyphe antarctica (Carmichael, 1819)

Synonyms
- Perca antarctica Carmichael, 1819; Palinurichthys antarcticus (Carmichael, 1819); Diagramma porosa Richardson, 1845; Hyperoglyphe porosa (Richardson, 1845); Palinurichthys porosus (Richardson, 1845); Eurumetopos johnstonii Morton, 1888; Seriolella amplus Griffin, 1928

= Hyperoglyphe antarctica =

Species of fish

Hyperoglyphe antarctica, the Antarctic butterfish, bluenose warehou, deepsea trevally, blue eye trevalla, blue-eye cod, bluenose sea bass, or deep sea trevalla, is a medusafish of the family Centrolophidae found in all the southern oceans, at depths of between 40 and 1,500 m. Its length is up to about 140 cm, with a maximum published weight of 60 kg.

Antarctic butterfish have a dark blue body above and lighter blue below with large eyes (another name for this fish is big eye). Larger individuals have a bronze sheen along the flanks.

They can grow to 1.4 m in length and over 50 kg in weight. Studies have shown that fish between 62 and 72 cm are mature and range in age between 8–12 years respectively. Mature females can produce between 2 million and 11 million eggs prior to spawning.

Blue eye mainly feed on the tunicate Pyrosoma atlantica. However, they will feed on a range of fish, molluscs, squid and crustaceans, and are also cannibalistic.

== Reproduction and distribution ==
This species is present in five distinct areas: Argentina, South Africa, southern Australia, Saint-Paul & Amsterdam French Austral Islands and New Zealand. Spawning appears to occur in an area north east of Tasmania during March and April.

Little is known about the egg and larval stages of blue eye. Recently Antarctic butterfish of approximately 10 cm have been found living in association with large masses of floating kelp. It is believed that as these juveniles reach 50 cm they become semi-bottom dwelling.

These young fish form schools over hard bottom at depths of around 350–450 m, moving to deeper waters as they grow.

== Gallery ==
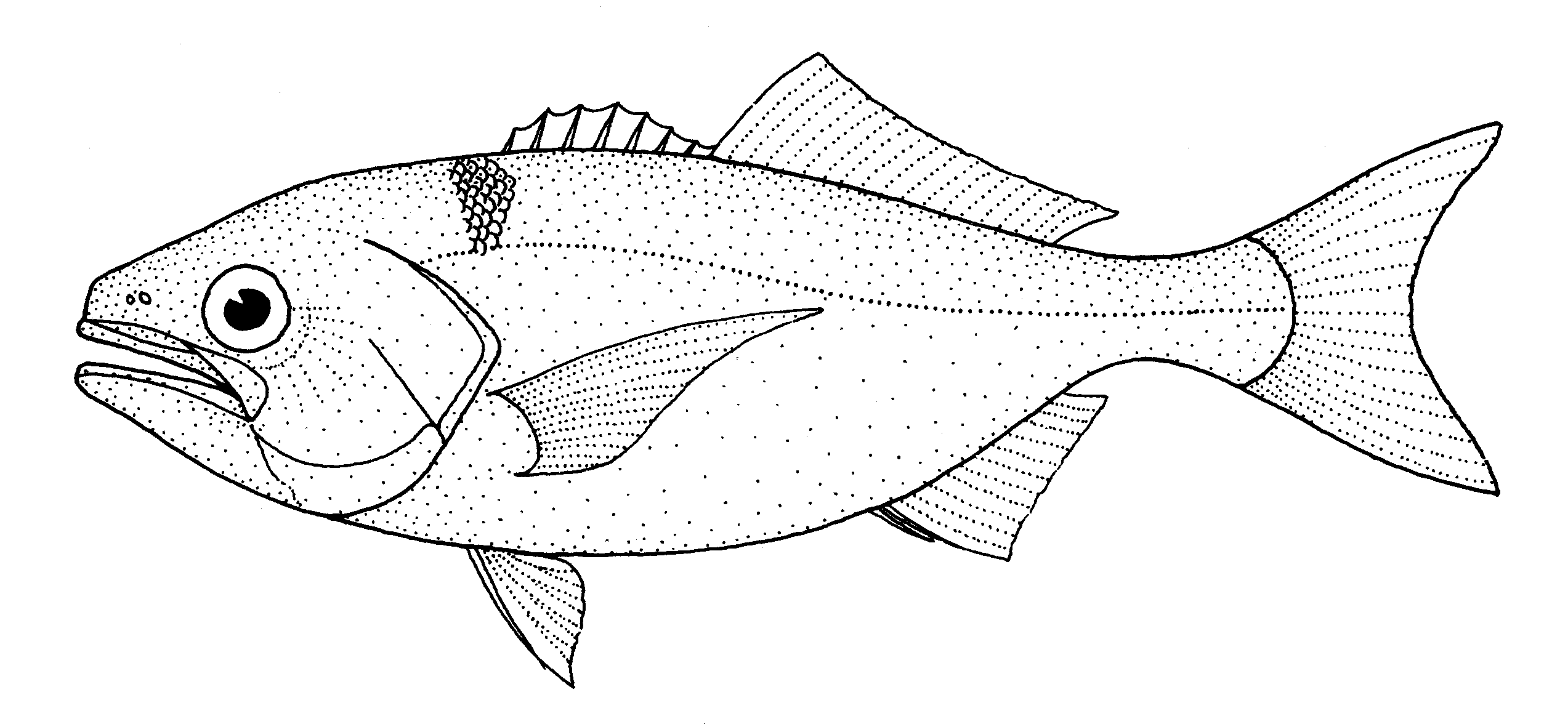
Drawing by Dr Tony Ayling

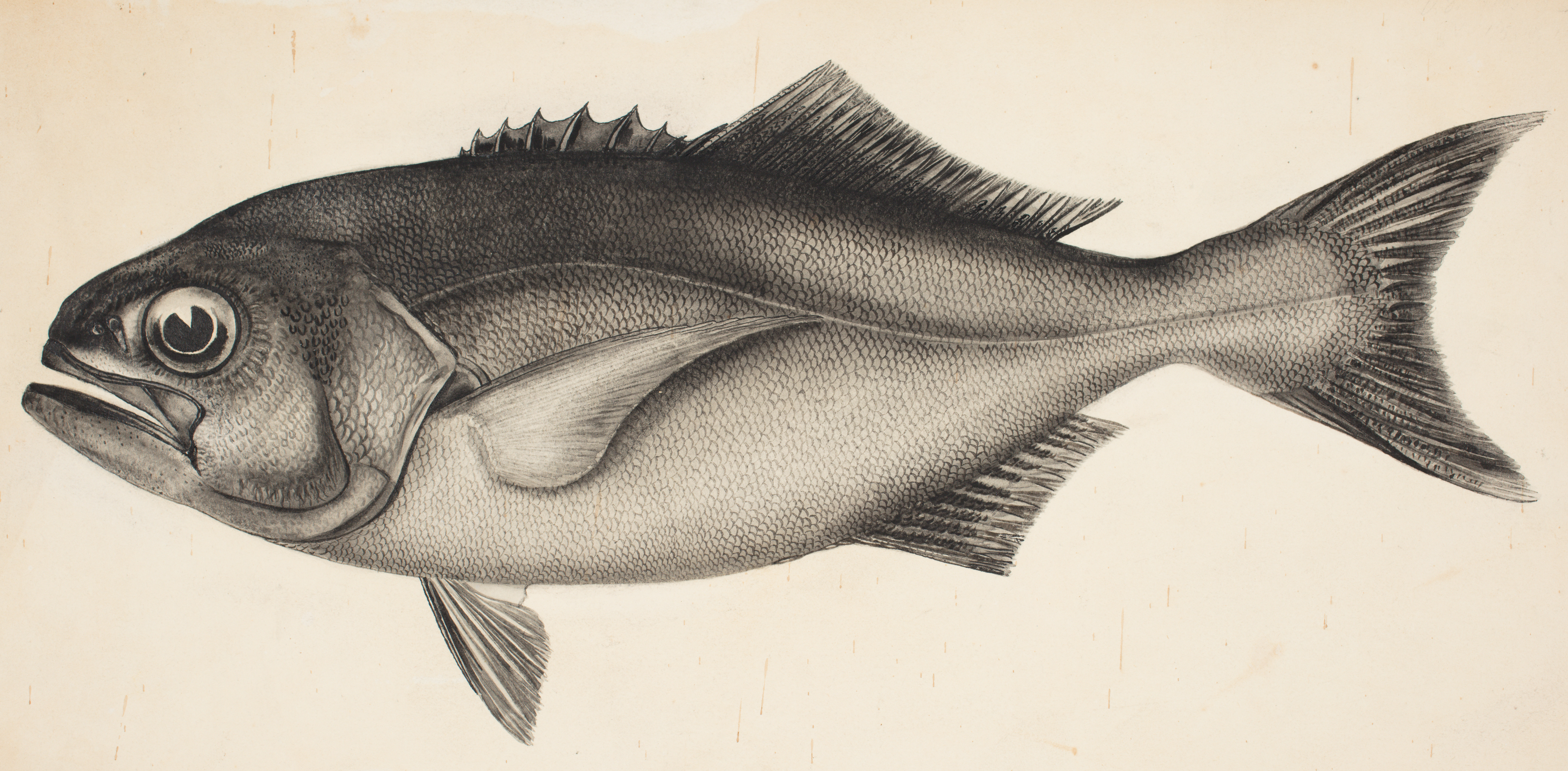
1928 drawing by Louis Thomas Griffin
- Tony Ayling & Geoffrey Cox, Collins Guide to the Sea Fishes of New Zealand, (William Collins Publishers Ltd, Auckland, New Zealand 1982) ISBN 0-00-216987-8
- New Zealand Ministry of Fisheries - https://web.archive.org/web/20081230124424/http://www.fish.govt.nz/en-nz/SOF/Species.htm?code=BNS&list=name
