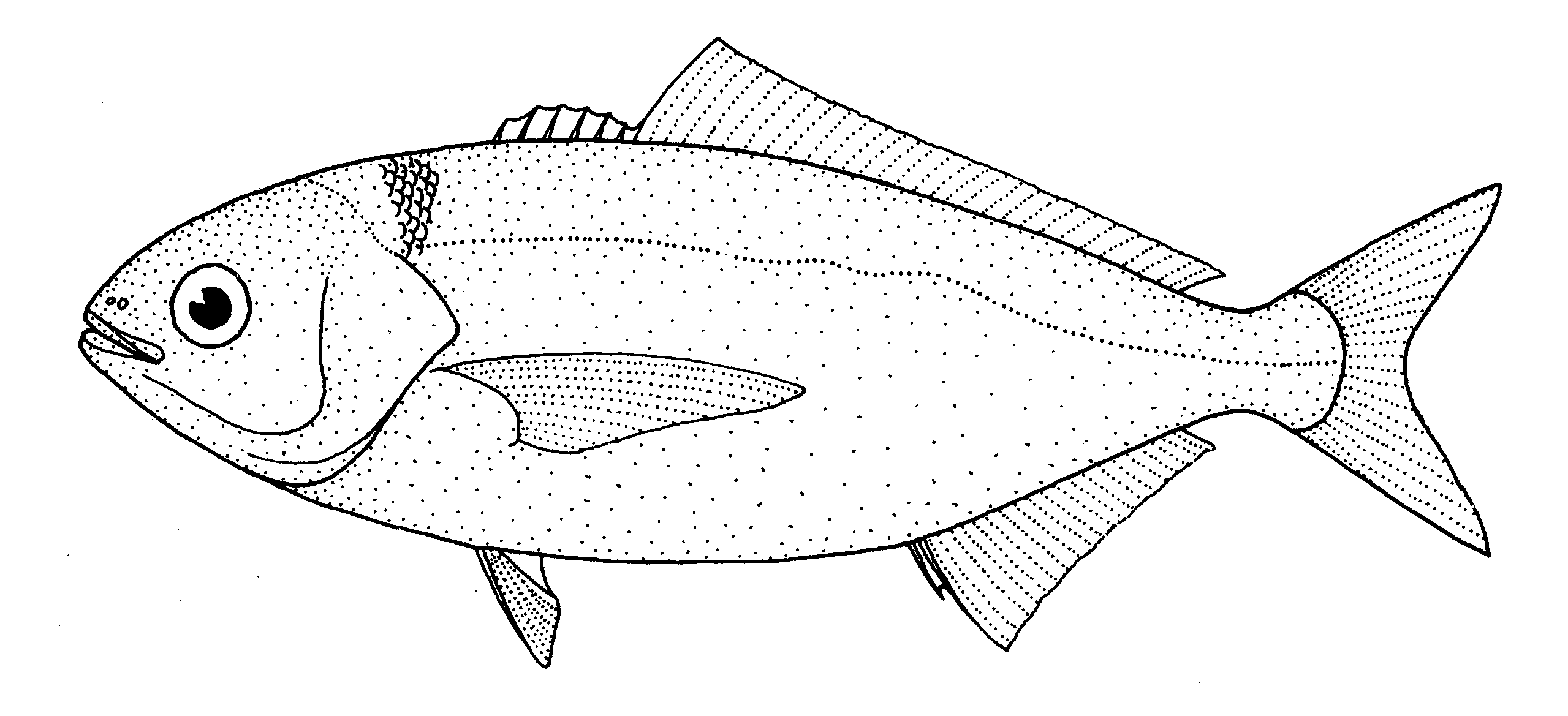
- Drawing by Dr Tony Ayling

Conservation status
- Least Concern (IUCN 3.1)

Scientific classification
- Kingdom: Animalia
- Phylum: Chordata
- Class: Actinopterygii
- Order: Scombriformes
- Family: Centrolophidae
- Genus: Seriolella
- Species: S. caerulea

Binomial name
- Seriolella caerulea Guichenot, 1848

Synonyms
- Palinurichthys caeruleus (Guichenot, 1848)

= White warehou =

Species of ray-finned fish

The white warehou, Seriolella caerulea, is a medusafish of the family Centrolophidae found in the southern Pacific and southern Atlantic oceans, at depths of between 500 and 800 m. Its length is up to about 75 cm.
