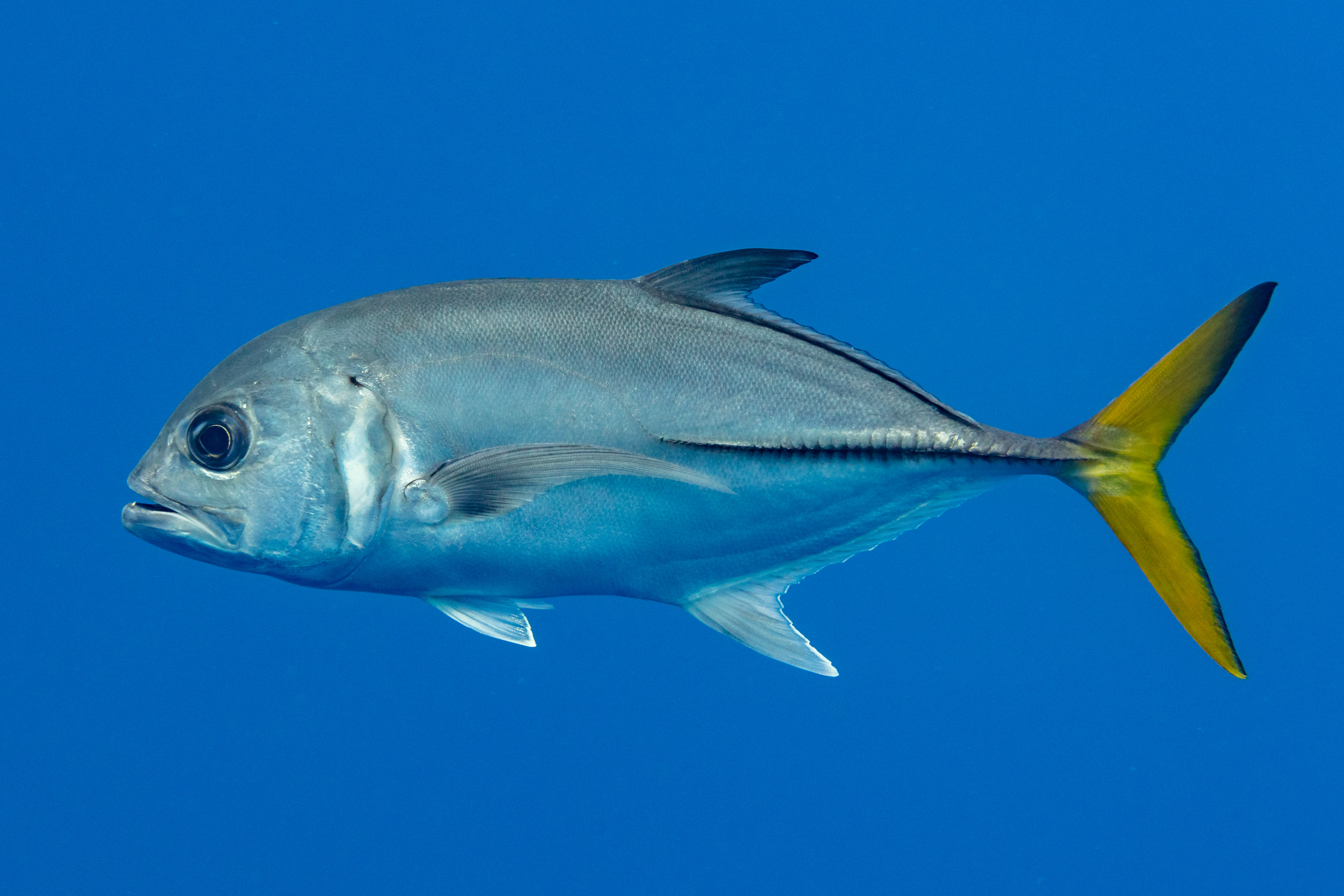

Conservation status
- Least Concern (IUCN 3.1)

Scientific classification
- Kingdom: Animalia
- Phylum: Chordata
- Class: Actinopterygii
- Order: Carangiformes
- Suborder: Carangoidei
- Family: Carangidae
- Genus: Caranx
- Species: C. latus

Binomial name
- Caranx latus Agassiz, 1831

Synonyms
- Xurel latus (Agassiz, 1831); Caranx lepturus Agassiz, 1831; Caranx fallax Cuvier, 1833; Caranx richardi Holbrook, 1855; Carangus aureus Poey, 1875

= Horse-eye jack =

Species of fish

The horse-eye jack (Caranx latus), also known as the big-eye jack, is a game fish and minor commercial fish in the family Carangidae. Its appearance is similar to that of the crevalle jack, although the horse-eye jack's head is not as blunt. The horse-eye jack is known to feed on smaller fish and on many invertebrates, such as shrimp and crab.

== Taxonomy and phylogeny ==
The horse-eye jack is classified within the genus Caranx, one of a number of groups known as the jacks or trevallies. Caranx itself is part of the larger jack and horse mackerel family Carangidae, which in turn is part of the order Carangiformes.

The horse-eye jack was first scientifically described in 1831 by the Swiss naturalist Louis Agassiz based on a specimen collected from the waters of Brazil. Agassiz published this description, along with a further three carangids, in a volume co-authored with the German biologist Johann Baptist von Spix entitled Selecta Genera et Species Piscium Brasiliensium. The specific epithet latus is Latin for 'broad', and may also refer to the flank of an animal. The new species was placed in the genus Caranx, with one subsequent revision reassigning the species to Xurel, now considered to be a junior synonym of Carangoides. In the same volume that C. latus was described, Agassiz also described Caranx lepturus, which later examination revealed to be synonymous with C. latus. Due to C. latus being described first in the publication, this name takes priority and relegates C. lepturus to junior synonymy. The species has been redescribed and named a further three times, all of which are similarly considered to be junior synonyms. The horse-eye jack is similar in appearance to the bigeye trevally (Caranx sexfasciatus) of the Indo-Pacific region, causing the American ichthyologist John Nichols to describe C latus as a 'form' of C. sexfasciatus. This analysis is no longer accepted, with the two species considered separate.

The horse-eye jack was included in a wide-ranging study of the molecular systematics of the Carangidae. In various analyses and models, C. latus always reliably placed in Caranx, being basal to a clade consisting of C. vinctus and C. caninus.

The species is commonly known as the horse-eye jack or horse-eye crevalle in reference to the large eyes of the species. Other lesser used names include big-eye jack and false jack.

== Description ==
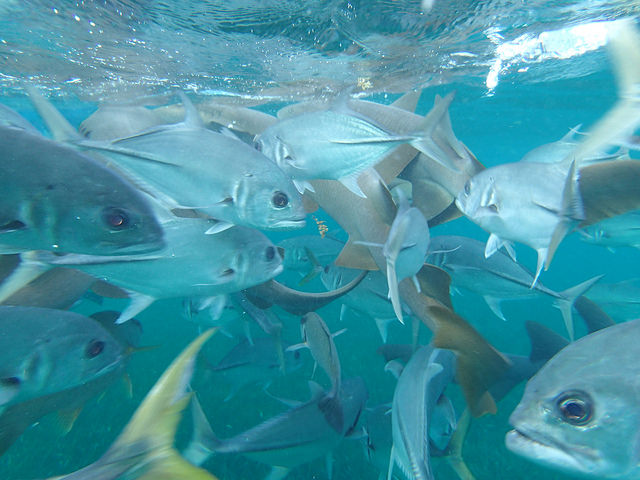
Horse-eyed jacks in Belize

The horse-eye jack is a large fish; it can grow to a maximum recorded length of 101 cm and a weight of 13.4 kg but is more common at lengths less than 60 cm. The horse-eye jack has a body form similar to other large jacks found throughout its range, with a moderately compressed elongate and deep body. The dorsal profile becomes more strongly curved anteriorly, however the forehead is less blunt than the crevalle jack. The eyes are large in proportion to the rest of the head and covered by a well-developed adipose eyelid, with the posterior extremity of the jaw vertically under or past the posterior margin of the eye. The dorsal fin is in two parts, the first consisting of eight spines and the second of one spine followed by 19 to 22 soft rays. The anal fin consists of two anteriorly detached spines followed by one spine and 16 to 18 soft rays. The lobes of the soft dorsal and anal fins are elongated, and the pectoral fin is falcate and longer than the length of the head. The lateral line has a pronounced and moderately long anterior arch. The straight section contains 32 to 39 very strong scutes, with bilateral keels present on the caudal peduncle. The chest is completely scaled. The upper jaw contains a series of strong outer canines with an inner band of smaller teeth, while the lower jaw contains a single row of teeth. The species has 22 to 25 gill rakers in total and 24 vertebrae are present. Like the crevalle jack, the horse-eye jack is known to develop hyperostosis in parts of its skeletal structure.

Adult horse-eye jack are typically dark blue to silvery-blue above, becoming silvery white to golden below. In some individuals the tip of the soft dorsal fin lobe and the scutes may be dark blue to black. The caudal fin is yellow to dusky in color. Unlike the crevalle jack, there is no dark spot at the base of the pectoral fin, although but there may be dark spots on the gill covers. Juveniles exhibit a series of about five dark vertical bars on their flanks which fade with age.

== Distribution ==
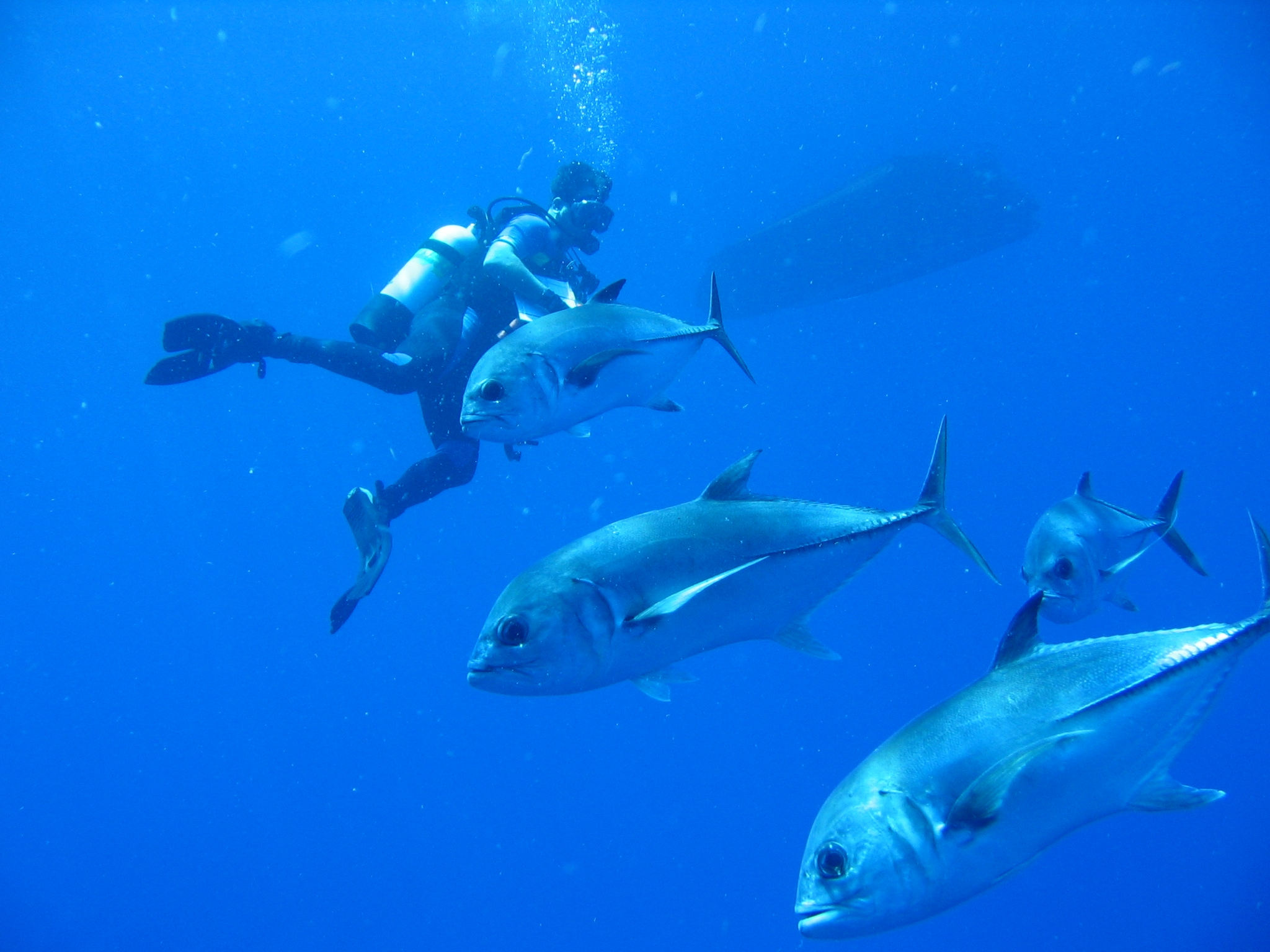
Horse-eye jacks with diver

The horse-eye jack is commonly found in the subtropical Atlantic Ocean from Bermuda and the northern Gulf of Mexico and south to Rio de Janeiro. In the eastern Atlantic, it is found from St. Paul's Rocks to Ascension Island and, rarely, in the Gulf of Guinea. It is a pelagic fish. It can be found on reefs and offshore oil rigs. The juvenile can be found closer to shore along sandy and muddy bottoms. The species may venture into brackish waters and can live in river mouths, but it is typically found in saltwater up to 140 m in depth.

The adult horse-eye jack commonly swims with others in a school, either as one species or mixed with crevalle jack. Sometimes it also swims as a pair with a member of a very different species, such as Halichoeres radiatus, a type of wrasse.

== Interaction with humans ==
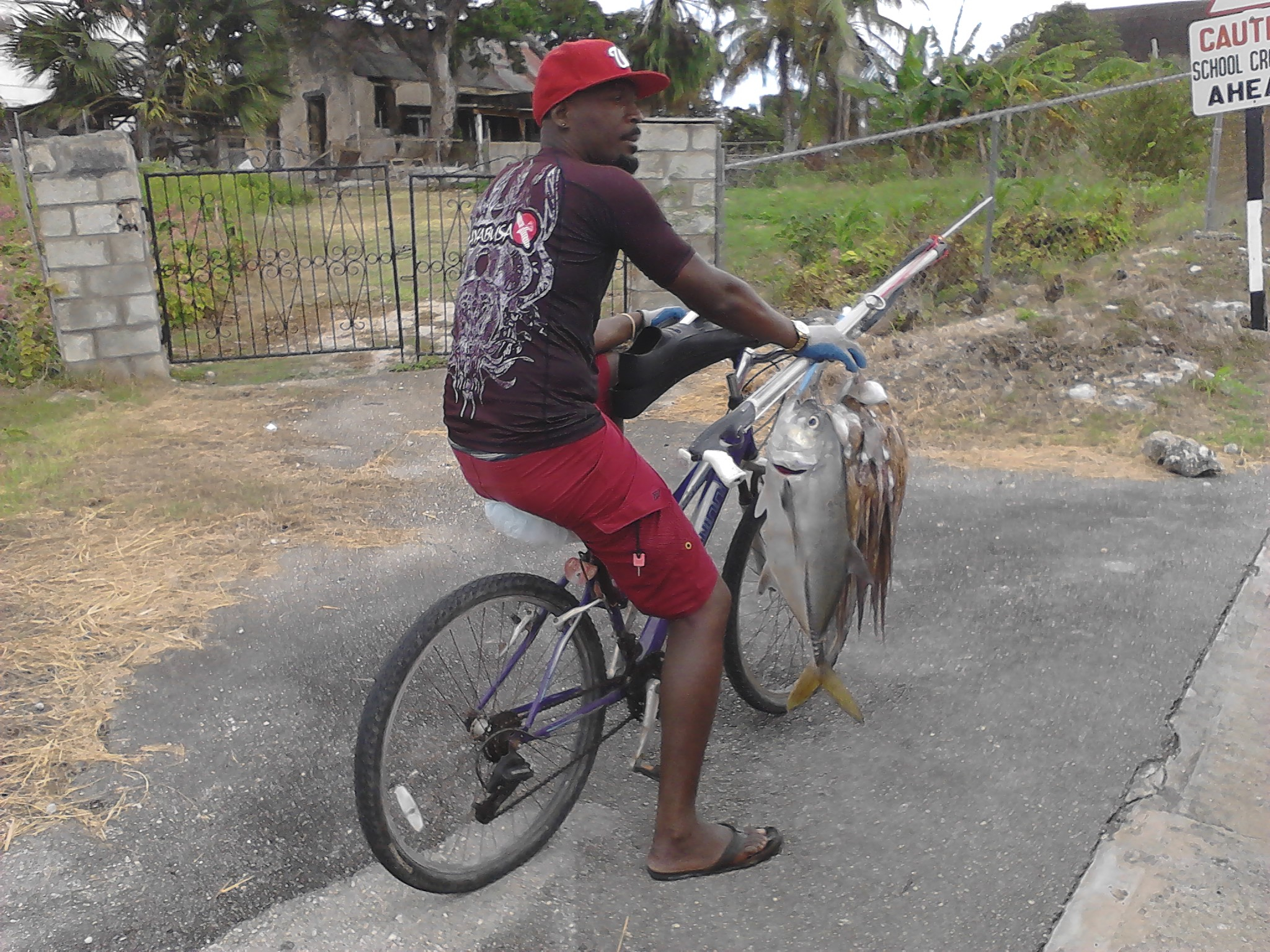
Man with a catch of horse-eye jack and sea catfish

The fish is generally wary of scuba divers; it will move slowly away as divers approach. However, schools have been known to crowd around divers, apparently attracted to the bubbles the diver exhales.

Throughout its range, the Horse-eye jack is a popular game fish and food fish and consequently is the target of both commercial and recreational fisheries. The current IGFA All Tackle World Record for this species is 32 lbs (14.51 kg), caught by Terry Lee Ramsey in the Gulf of Mexico off Texas, USA. Previous world records came from Ascension Island, UK; Miami, Florida, USA; Cancun, Mexico, Miami Beach, Florida, USA; and Plantagenet Bank, Bermuda. They are commonly used as bait for larger species of game fish including Atlantic Sailfish, Blue Marlin, Tarpon, and Snook. Horse-eye jack have been identified as a significant carrier of the ciguatera toxin and so should be consumed with caution, if at all. The toxins C-CTX-1 and C-CTX-2 of this fish are potent, both have an LD50 of 3.6 μg / kg and 1 μg / kg respectively.
