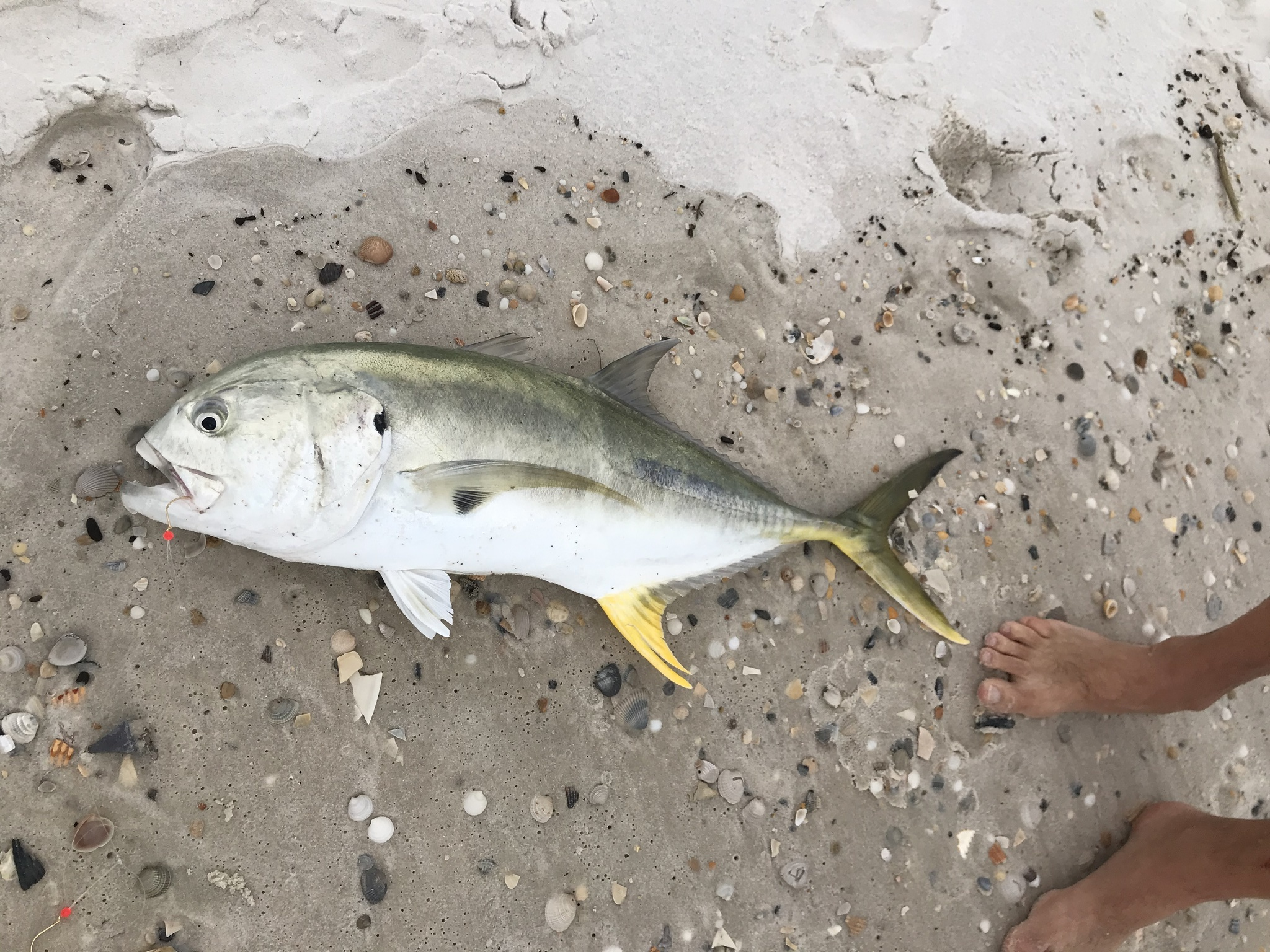

Conservation status
- Least Concern (IUCN 3.1)

Scientific classification
- Kingdom: Animalia
- Phylum: Chordata
- Class: Actinopterygii
- Division: Teleostei
- Order: Carangiformes
- Suborder: Carangoidei
- Family: Carangidae
- Genus: Caranx
- Species: C. hippos

Binomial name
- Caranx hippos (Linnaeus, 1766)
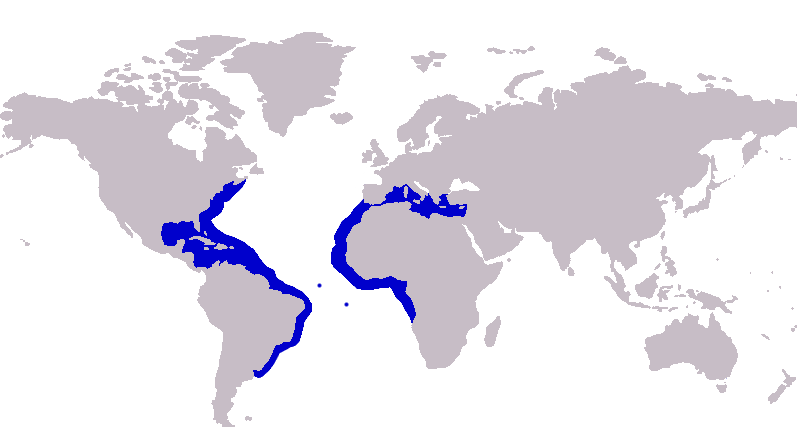
- Approximate range of the crevalle jack

Synonyms
- List: Scomber hippos Linnaeus, 1766; Carangus hippos (Linnaeus, 1766); Scomber carangus Bloch, 1793; Caranx carangus (Bloch, 1793); Caranx carangua Lacépède, 1801; Caranx erythrurus Lacepède, 1801; Caranx antilliarum Bennett, 1840; Caranx defensor DeKay, 1842; Trachurus cordyla Gronow, 1854; Carangus esculentus Girard, 1859; Caranx esculentus (Girard, 1859); Caranx hippos hippos (Linnaeus, 1766); Caranx hippos tropicus Nichols, 1920

= Crevalle jack =

Species of fish

The crevalle jack (Caranx hippos), also known as the common jack, black-tailed trevally, couvalli jack, black cavalli, jack crevale, or yellow cavalli is a common species of large marine fish classified within the jack family, Carangidae. The crevalle jack is distributed across the tropical and temperate waters of the Atlantic Ocean, ranging from Nova Scotia, Canada to Uruguay in the western Atlantic and Portugal to Angola in the eastern Atlantic, including the Mediterranean Sea. It is distinguishable from similar species by its deep body, fin colouration and a host of more detailed anatomical features, including fin ray and lateral line scale counts. It is one of the largest fish in the genus Caranx, growing to a maximum known length of 124 cm and a weight of 32 kg, although is rare at lengths greater than 60 cm. The crevalle jack inhabits both inshore and offshore waters to depths of around 350 m, predominantly over reefs, bays, lagoons and occasionally estuaries. Young fish dispersed north by currents in the eastern Atlantic are known to migrate back to more tropical waters before the onset of winter; however, if the fish fail to migrate, mass mortalities occur as the temperature falls below the species' tolerance.

The crevalle jack is a powerful, predatory fish, with extensive studies showing the species consumes a variety of small fish, with invertebrates such as prawns, shrimps, crabs, molluscs and cephalopods also of minor importance. Dietary shifts with both age, location and season have been demonstrated, which led some researchers to postulate the species is indiscriminant in its feeding habits. The crevalle jack reaches maturity at 55 cm in males and 66 cm in females, with spawning taking place year round, although peaks in activity have been documented in several sites. The larval and juvenile growth has been extensively studied, with the oldest known individual 17 years of age. The crevalle jack is an important species to commercial fisheries throughout its range, with annual catches ranging between 1000 and 30 000 tonnes over its entire range. It is taken by a variety of netting methods, including purse nets, seines and gill nets, as well as hook-and-line methods. The crevalle jack is also a revered gamefish, taken both by lures and bait. The species is considered of good to poor quality table fare, and is sold fresh, frozen, or preserved, or as fishmeal or oil at market. The crevalle jack is closely related to both the Pacific crevalle jack and the longfin crevalle jack, the latter of which has been extensively confused with the true crevalle jack until recently.

== Taxonomy and phylogeny ==
The species belongs to what William Smith-Vaniz and Ken Carpenter refer to as the Caranx hippos complex, a group of closely related fishes which also includes Caranx caninus (Pacific crevalle jack) and Caranx fischeri (longfin crevalle jack).

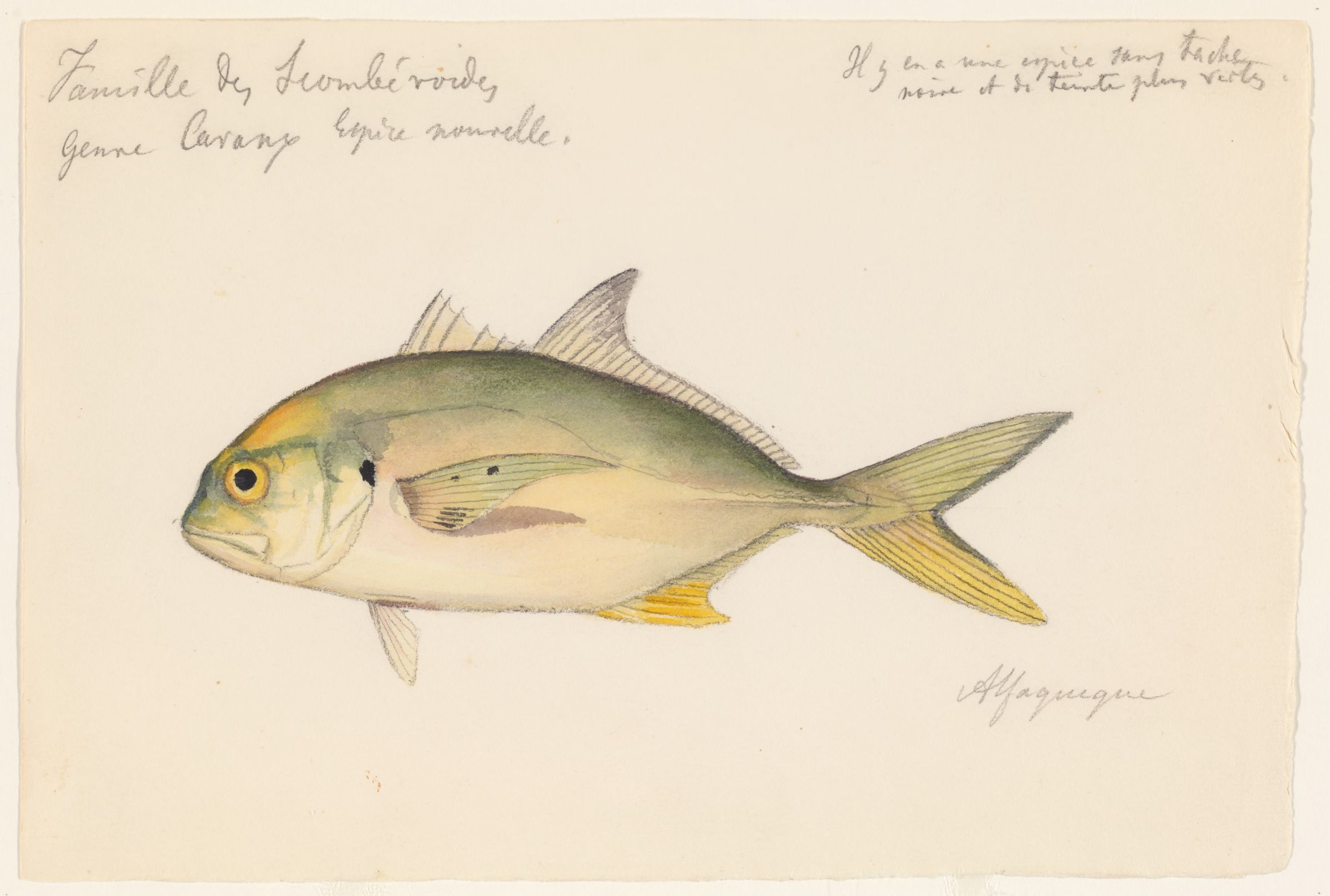
19th century watercolor of a Caranx hippos by Jacques Burkhardt

The crevalle jack was the first species of its genus to be scientifically described and named, and is the type species of the genus Caranx. It was described and named in 1766 by the famed Swedish taxonomist Carl Linnaeus, based on the holotype specimen taken off the coast of the Carolinas, United States. He named the species Scomber hippos, placing it in the mackerel genus Scomber, a practice which was common prior to 1801 when the carangids were not yet recognised as separate from the scombrids. The specific epithet means "horse" in Latin, with Scomber hippos literally translating in English as "horse mackerel", which has become a common name for many species of carangid. As the state of fish taxonomy progressed, the species was transferred to both Caranx and Carangus, with the name Caranx hippos now accepted. Bernard Germain de Lacépède was the first person to separate the crevalle jack from the mackerels, placing it in its own genus Caranx, although he had redescribed the fish as Caranx carangua, which became the type species of Caranx. As well as Lacepede's renaming, the species has been independently redescribed a total of six times, with all of these names, including Lacepede's, categorised as invalid junior synonyms under ICZN rules.

There has been extensive discussion in the scientific literature regarding the possible conspecifity of the Pacific crevalle jack, Caranx caninus, with Caranx hippos. Arguments ranged from the species being conspecific, subspecific or as individual species. This led to the creation of two trinomial names; Caranx hippos hippos and Caranx hippos tropicus. The former was an attempt to separate the 'subspecies' on each side of the Americas, while the latter was an unnecessary name to divide the Atlantic Caranx hippos into subspecies. The most recent review of the species complex by Smith-Vaniz and Carpenter treated the fish as separate species, citing differences in the development of hyperostosis and differing anal fin colours as evidence of species status.

=== Etymology ===
The species' most often used common name, crevalle jack (or 'jack crevalle') is based on the word "cavalla", an earlier word used for the jacks. Other names include common jack, black-tailed trevally, couvalli jack, black cavalli, yellow cavalli and a host of generic names, such as horse mackerel and crevalle.

== Distribution ==
The crevalle jack inhabits the tropical and temperate waters of the Atlantic Ocean, ranging extensively along both the eastern American coastline and the western African and European coastlines. In the western Atlantic, the southernmost record comes from Uruguay, with the species ranging north along the Central American coastline, and throughout the Caribbean and many of the numerous archipelagos within. The species is found throughout the Greater Antilles, however it is absent from the leeward Lesser Antilles, with its distribution being patchy throughout other Caribbean archipelagos. From the Gulf of Mexico, its distribution extends north along the U.S. coast and as far north as Nova Scotia in Canada, also taking in several northwest Atlantic islands. The crevalle jack is also known from Saint Helena Island in the southern Atlantic Ocean.

In the eastern Atlantic, the southernmost record comes from Angola, with the species distributed north along the west African coastline up to West Sahara and Morocco, with its distribution also including much of the Mediterranean Sea. In the Mediterranean, its range extends as far east as Libya in the south and Turkey in the north, and includes most of the northern Mediterranean, including Greece, Italy and Spain. The species' northernmost record in the eastern Atlantic comes from Portugal, with the species also known to inhabit many of the northeastern Atlantic islands, including Cape Verde, Madeira Island, and the Canary Islands.

Many older publications list the species range as from the eastern Pacific, which now is known to represent the Pacific crevalle jack and is considered a distinct species. There are also often mentions of the species erroneously having circumtropical and Indian Ocean distributions, with these records probably attributable to similar Indo-Pacific species, namely the blacktip trevally and giant trevally. The species distribution overlaps that of the similar longfin crevalle jack in the eastern Atlantic, with careful identification needed to distinguish the two. Within the Atlantic, confusion with both longfin crevalle jack and horse-eye jack, Caranx latus, have also led to erroneous records being made, with Smith-Vaniz and Carpenter suggesting this occurred in the Mediterranean, and the species may actually be absent from waters north of Mauritania.

== Description ==
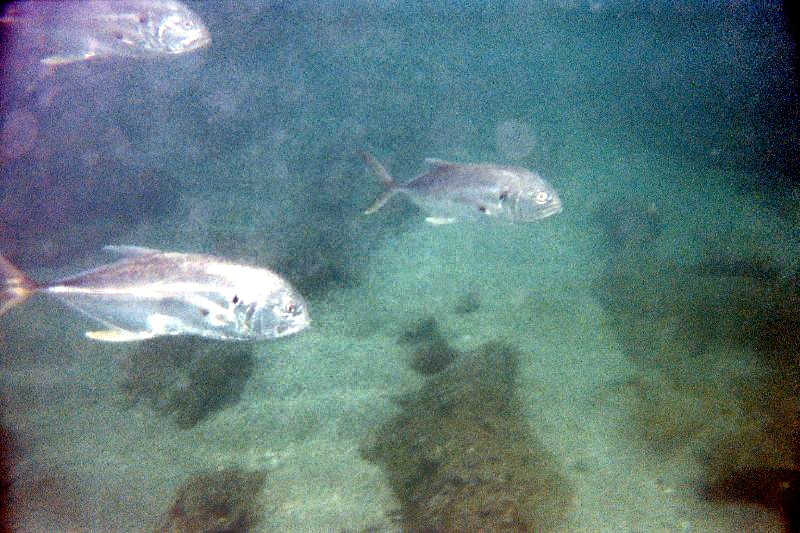
Several crevalle jacks over a reef in Florida

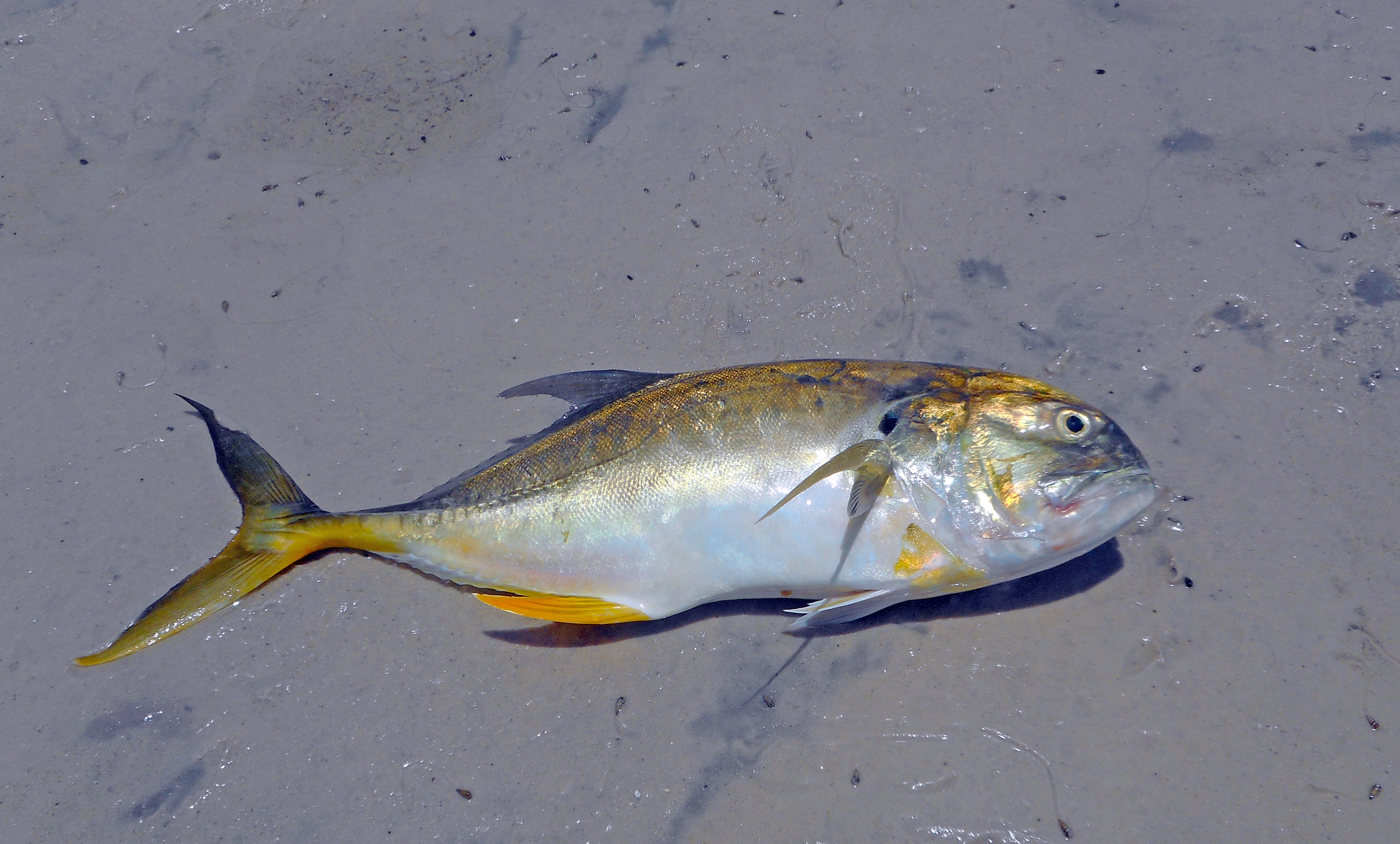
In Miami, Florida

The crevalle jack is one of the largest members of Caranx, growing to a known maximum length of 125 cm and a weight of 32 kg, although it is generally uncommon at lengths greater than 65 cm. Unverified reports of fish over 150 cm may also be attributable to this species. The crevalle jack is morphologically similar to a number of other deep-bodied carangids, having an elongate, moderately compressed body with the dorsal profile more convex than the ventral profile, particularly anteriorly. The eye is covered by a well-developed adipose eyelid, and the posterior extremity of the jaw is vertically under or past the posterior margin of the eye. The dorsal fin is in two parts, the first consisting of eight spines and the second of one spine followed by 19 to 21 soft rays. The anal fin consists of two anteriorly detached spines followed by one spine and 16 or 17 soft rays. The pelvic fins contain one spine and five soft rays, while the pectoral fins contain 20 or 21 soft rays. The caudal fin is strongly forked, and the pectoral fins are falcate, being longer than the length of the head. The lateral line has a pronounced and moderately long anterior arch, with the curved section intersecting the straight section midway below the second dorsal fin. The straight section contains 23 to 35 very strong scutes, with bilateral keels present on the caudal peduncle. The chest is devoid of scales with the exception of a small patch of scales in front of the pelvic fins. The upper jaw contains a series of strong outer canines with an inner band of smaller teeth, while the lower jaw contains a single row of teeth. The species has 35 to 42 gill rakers in total and 25 vertebrae are present.

In 1972, a crevalle jack caught by fishermen off South Carolina displayed swollen, bulbous mandibles. These swellings were initially thought to be due to a copepod parasite, however radiographs and subsequent sectioning found them to be bony in nature. The cause of this calcified connective tissue is still unknown, and there remains only a single reported case of such an ailment in crevalle jack.

The crevalle jack's colour ranges from brassy green to blue or bluish-black dorsally, becoming silvery white or golden ventrally. A dark spot is present on the pectoral fin, with a similar dark to dusky spot present on the upper margin of the operculum. Juveniles have around five dark vertical bands on their sides, with these fading at adulthood. The first dorsal fin, pectoral and pelvic fins range from white to dusky, occasionally with golden tinges throughout. The anal fin lobe is bright yellow, with the remainder of the fin ranging from golden to dusky, while the underside of the caudal peduncle often being yellow in adults. The caudal fin itself is also golden to dusky, with the lower lobe often brighter yellow than the upper, with both the lobes often having a black trailing edge.

== Habitat ==
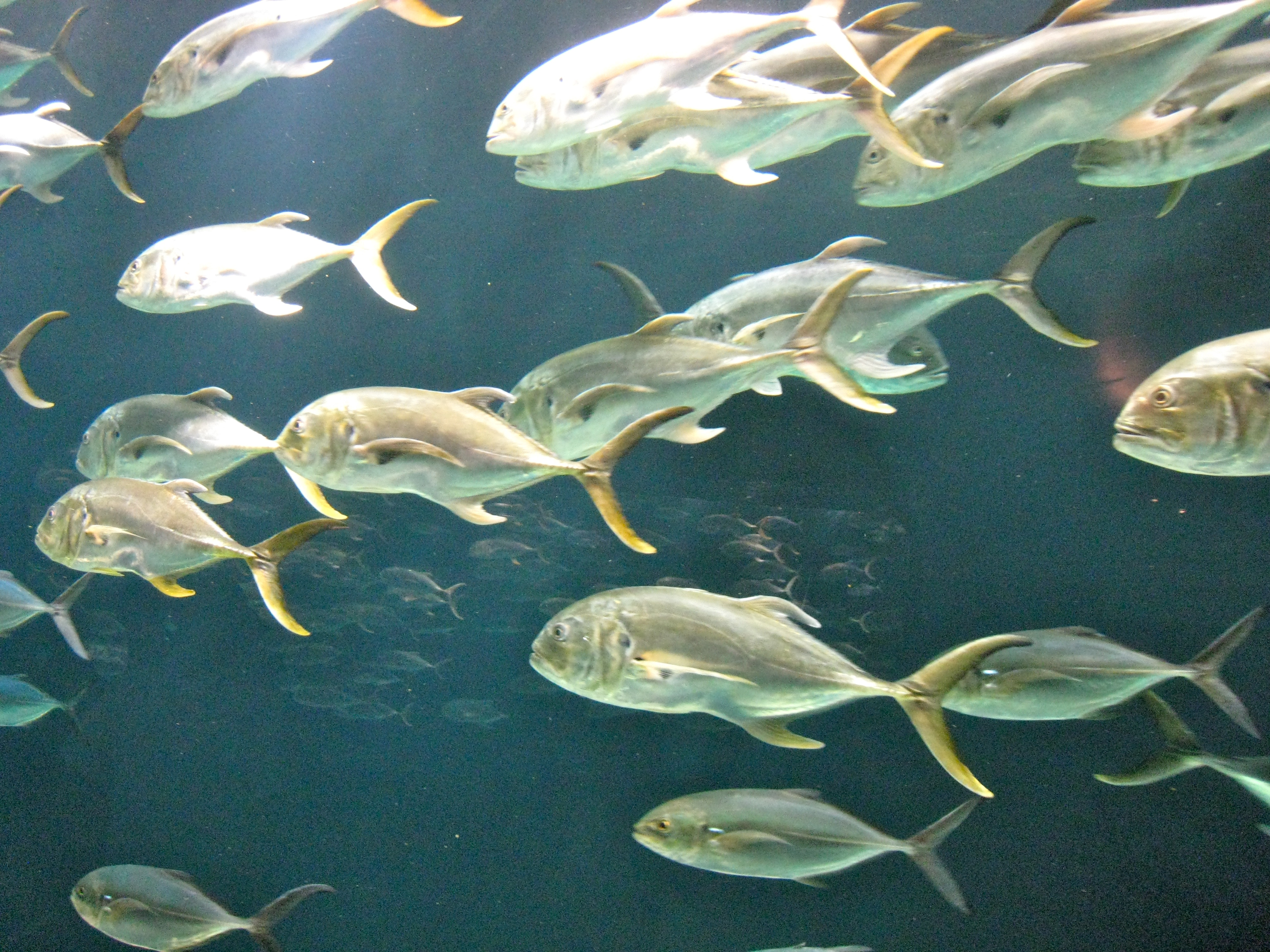
Crevalle jacks swimming in the Georgia Aquarium

The crevalle jack lives in both inshore and offshore habitats, with larger adults preferring deeper waters than juveniles. In the inshore environment, crevalle jack inhabit shallow flats, sandy bays, beaches, seagrass beds, shallow reef complexes and lagoons. The species is also known to enter brackish waters, with some individuals known to penetrate far upstream; however, like most euryhaline species, they generally do not penetrate very far upriver. The water salinities where the species has been reported from range from 0% to 49%, indicating the species can adapt to a wide range of waters. Studies in West Africa found marked differences in the sex ratios of populations in brackish waters, with females very rarely seen in such environments once they are mature. Research in the coastal waters of Ghana suggests the availability of food is the primary control on the species distribution in inshore waters.

Adults that move offshore generally do not leave continental shelf waters, however still penetrate to depths of 350 m, and possibly deeper. These individuals live on the outer shelf edges, sill reefs and upper slopes of the deep reef, and tend to be more solitary than juveniles. Adults have also been sighted around the large oil rig platforms throughout the Gulf of Mexico, where they use the man-made structure like a reef to hunt prey. The larvae and young juveniles of the species live pelagically offshore along the continental shelf and slope, and are also known to congregate around oil platforms, as well as natural floating debris such as sargassum mats.

== Biology and ecology ==
The crevalle jack is one of the most abundant large carangids in the Atlantic Ocean, with at least two systematic studies placing it within the top five most abundant species of that region, namely lagoons in Nigeria and Chiapas, Mexico. Seasonal movements are known from both the American and African coastlines, with both juveniles and adults appearing to migrate. In North America, young individuals recruited to northern estuaries are known to move to warmer tropical waters at the onset of winter to escape possible hypothermia. At least one hypothermia-driven mass mortality of 200 crevalle jacks has been reported from the Slocum River in Massachusetts, indicating low-temperature mortality is a major concern for north-ranging groups of the species, with temperatures below 9.0 °C apparently being lethal to the fish. This applies not only to river dwelling fish, but also to marine migrants which linger too long in the temperate regions during winter. In Nigeria, and presumably other parts of Africa, the species appears to migrate seasonally, possibly to take advantage of prey, with the fish arriving in Nigeria during September to November. The species is more active during the day than the night, with larger catches in fisheries taken during the day, also. The crevalle jack is a schooling species for most of its life, forming moderately large to very large, fast-moving schools. At larger sizes, the fish become more solitary and move to the deeper offshore reefs. Evidence from laboratory studies indicates crevalle jack are able to coordinate their feeding and spawning aggregations over coral reefs based on the release of dimethylsulfoniopropionate (DMSP) from the reef. DMSP is a naturally occurring chemical produced by marine algae and, to a lesser extent, corals and their symbiotic zooxanthellae. Field studies have also shown the species increases in abundance with increased levels of DMSP over coral reefs.

=== Diet and feeding ===
The crevalle jack is a powerful predatory fish which predominantly takes other small fishes as prey at all stages of its life, with various invertebrates generally being of secondary importance to its diet. Several studies conducted on the species' diet over its range have found other aspects of its diet vary widely, including the specific types of prey the species takes and the change in diet with age. The most detailed of these studies was conducted in the Southern USA, which showed the species diet comprised between 74% and 94% fish. The remainder of the diet was various prawns, shrimps, crabs, molluscs and stomatopods. The types of fish taken varied throughout the range, with members of Clupeidae, Sparidae, Carangidae and Trichiuridae all taken in variable amounts, usually with members of one family dominating the local diet. The percentage of various invertebrates also was highly variable, with penaeid shrimps, portunid crabs, stomatopods and squid being of importance to different populations. The study also indicated young crevalle jack predominantly take clupeids, adding sparids and later carangids to their diets as they grow larger. The larger individuals also took much higher amounts of invertebrates, and also small quantities of seagrass, indicating larger fish are more opportunistic. This general change in diet with age also seems spatially variable, with young crevalle jack in both Maryland and Puerto Rico consuming almost exclusively crustaceans, including shrimps, crabs (and juvenile tarpon) in Maryland and harpacticoid copepods in Puerto Rico before moving to fish-dominated diets later in life. Research in Ghana shows a pattern somewhat intermediate to the previous two locations; adults take larger fish, predominantly Engraulis guineensis and Sardinella eba, while juvenile fish take smaller fishes such as Epiplatys sexfasciatus or juvenile caridean and penaeid shrimps.

The widely variable diet of the species throughout its life stages led authors in the 1950s and 1960s to conclude the species was indiscriminate in its feeding habits, eating whatever was locally available. The diets of the populations in both the southern USA and Ghana also varied quite markedly by season and year, which led the authors of both these studies to agree with these earlier conclusions. Recent laboratory studies, however, have shown the species may have preferences for certain sizes of prey. In these experiments, the fish were presented with a range of size classes of the same prey species, Menidia beryllina, with the results showing they prefer to take the smallest size class possible, which contrasts with more aggressive predators, such as bluefish. Both adults and juveniles feed throughout the day, generally becoming inactive at night. During some feeding periods recorded in Ghana, digestion in the species was so rapid that food becomes unidentifiable within four to five hours of consumption. The crevalle jack is also an important prey species itself, taken by larger fish, such as billfish and sharks, as well as seabirds. As well as being preyed on during its adult stage, the spawn of the crevalle jack is known to be eaten by planktivorous organisms, including whale sharks in the Caribbean.

=== Life history ===
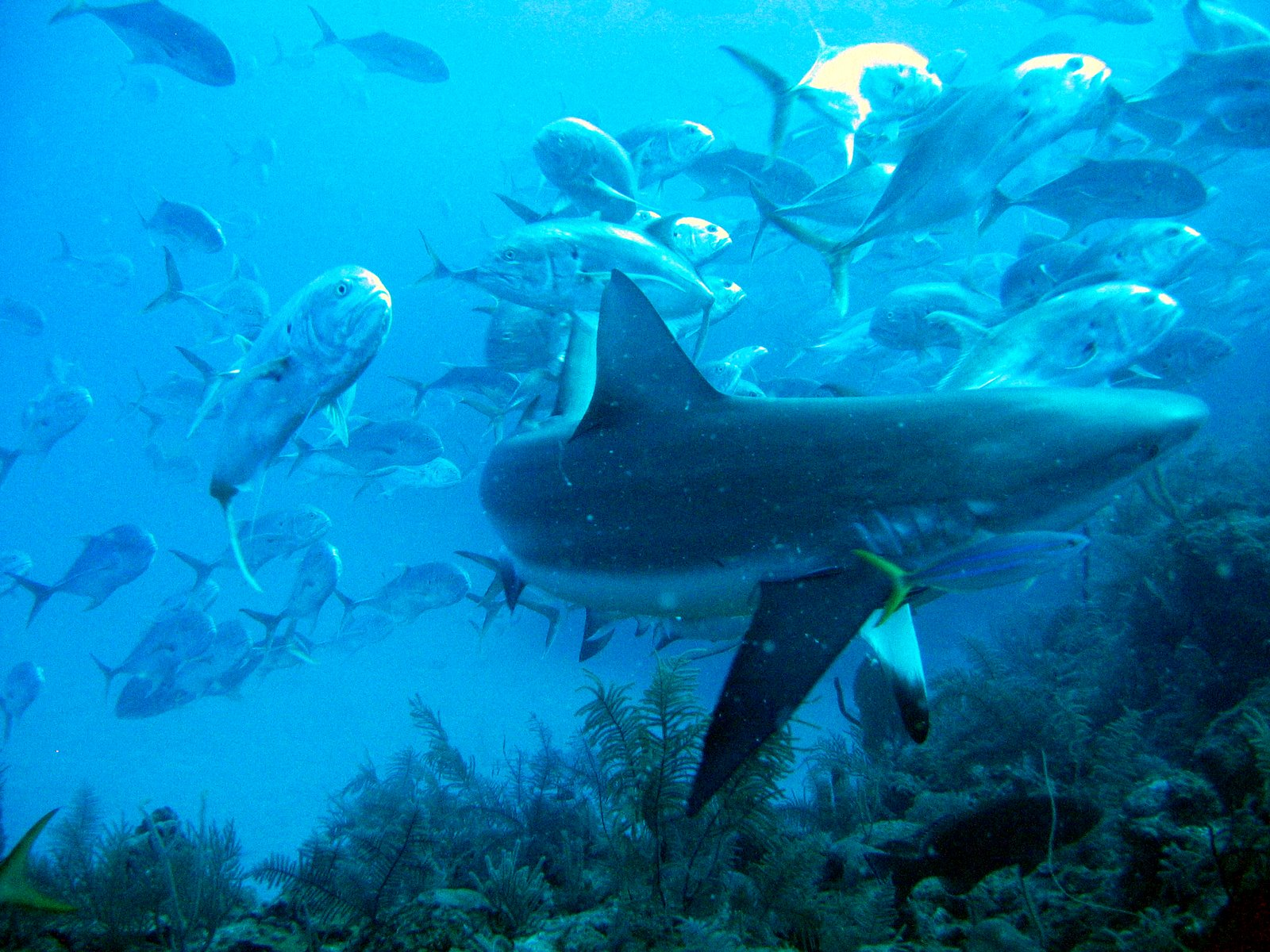
A school of crevalle jack swarming around a Caribbean reef shark

The crevalle jack reaches sexual maturity at different lengths in males and females, with estimates suggesting males reach maturity at 55 cm and four to five years of age, and females at 66 cm and five to six years of age. Reproduction is thought to occur year-round in most areas, although there are peaks in activity. South of Florida, this period is between March and September, in Cuba it is April and May, while in Jamaica no definitive peak has yet been identified. The species also has a protracted spawning in Ghana, although a peak in activity occurs between October and January. Juveniles are also present in lagoons year round in this location, indicating year round spawning and recruitment. The place of spawning also appears to be variable, with the act occurring offshore south of Florida, while in Colombia and Belize, they have been observed spawning over inshore reefs and bays. Large aggregations of crevalle jack form prior to spawning, with these schools containing upward of 1000 individuals. Pairs break off from the school to spawn, with one individual turning a much darker color during this exchange. Once spawning has occurred, the pair rejoins the main school. Fecundity in the species has been estimated as up to one million eggs, with these being pelagic, and spherical in shape. They have a diameter of 0.7 to 0.9 mm, and contain a pigmented yolk and one yellow oil globule with dark pigments. The larvae have been extensively described in the scientific literature, although the sequence of fin formation is still not well known. Defining features of the larval crevalle jack include a relatively deep body, heavily pigmented head and body, and more detailed meristic characteristics, with flexion occurring at 4 to 5 mm in length.

Otolith and vertebrae studies have proved useful in determining the age and thus growth patterns of the species, with other methods including scale and fin ray sectioning having lesser value. The species otoliths have been the subject of detailed X-ray diffraction studies, which have indicated biomineralisation of the otoliths occurs predominantly in the aragonite phase. Females grow faster than males, reaching 266.5 mm after their first year of life, 364.4 after their second, 370.9 mm after the third and 546.7 after their fifth. A female of 676.6 mm was 9 years old. Males reach 252.4 mm in their first year, 336.2 mm in their second, 363.8 in the third and 510.3 in their fifth. A male of 554 mm was eight years old. The oldest studied individual was a 934-mm individual of unspecified sex, which was 17 years old. The larvae are pelagic and are found over continental shelf waters and occasionally in the oceanic zone proximal to the continental slope. They are present all year round in the Gulf of Mexico, with a peak in abundance during the summer months due to spawning peaks. While the young juveniles live in the exposed pelagic environment, they use a behaviour called 'piloting' to swim in very close proximity to both larger animals and floating objects, such as sargassum mats, buoys and even boats. By the time juveniles make their way to shore, they may have been dispersed large distances from their initial spawning grounds and may face the challenge of migration to warmer climates during winter if they are to survive as outlined previously. Juveniles use estuaries and seagrass beds as their main nursery habitats.

== Relationship to humans ==
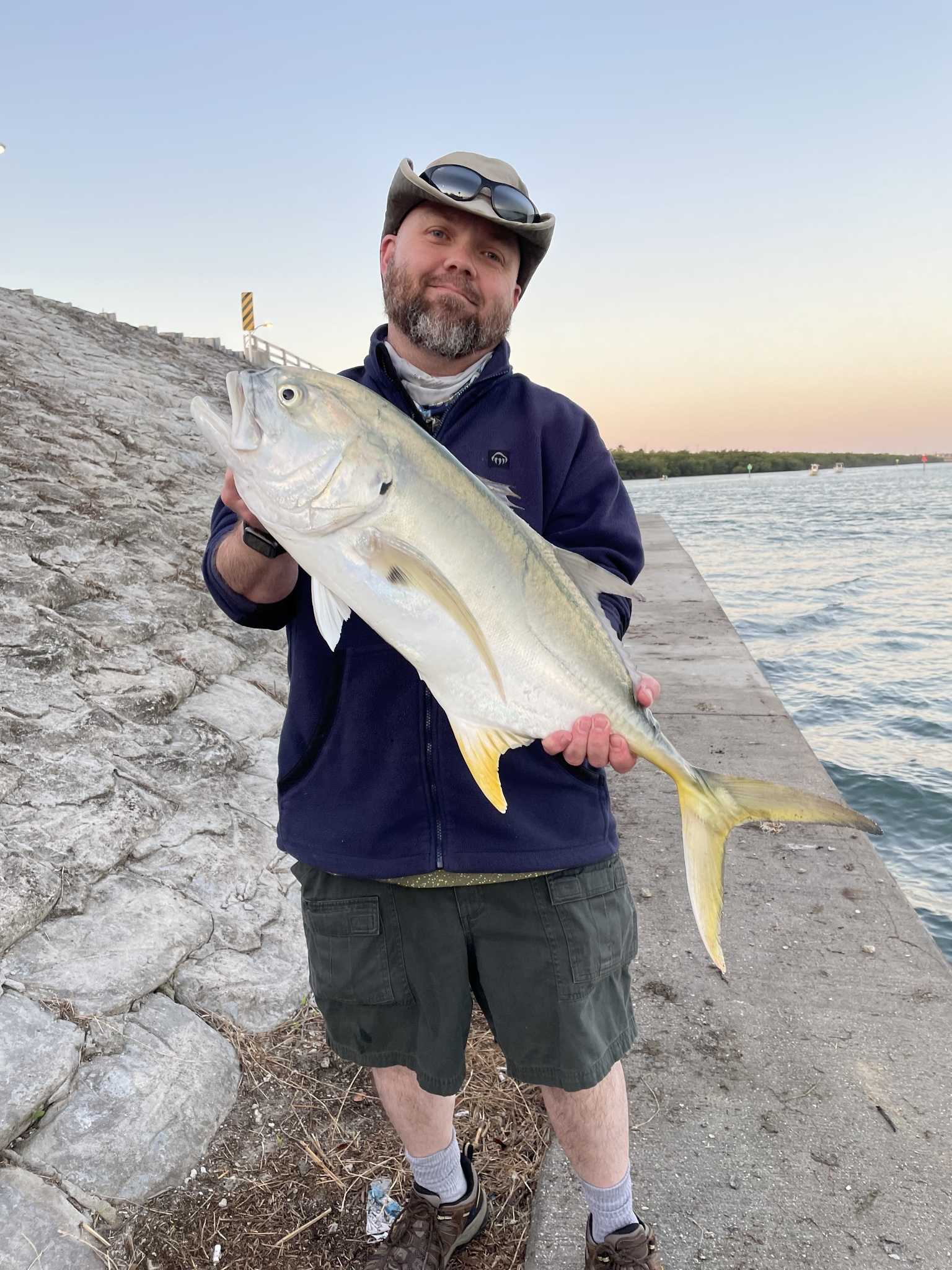
In Florida

The crevalle jack is a highly important species to commercial fisheries throughout its range, with the greatest quantity of the species taken from the eastern Atlantic. In some fisheries, it is one of the most abundant species and therefore of great importance in these regions. In the Americas, the reported annual catch has ranged between 150 and 1300 tonnes since 1950, with catches since 2000 ranging between 190 and 380 tonnes. Most of the western Atlantic catch is from Florida, although Caribbean fisheries, such as Trinidad, take considerable quantities of the fish. The eastern Atlantic catch statistics do not differentiate longfin crevalle jack from crevalle jack, thus must be considered a composite dataset. This region only comprises catch data from Angola, Ghana, São Tome, and Principe. These catches are much larger than in the east, with hauls of between 1000 and 38 000 tonnes per year recorded since 1950, although catches since 2000 only range between 1900 and 10 200 tonnes. Crevalle jack is taken by a number of fishing methods, including haul seines, gill nets, purse seines, trawls, handlines and trolling lines. The abundance of the species in Trinidad leads to the fish being taken in several quite different types of fishery; demersal trawls, artisanal gill nets and even beach seines, which illustrates the species' importance. In Trinidad, recreational fishermen also may sell their catch, which adds to the overall quantity of fish sold. Crevalle jack is sold at market fresh, frozen, salted, and smoked, and as fishmeal and oil.

The crevalle jack is a popular and highly regarded gamefish throughout its range, with the recreational catch of the species often exceeding commercial catches. The only amateur catch data available are from the US, which has an annual catch of around 400 to 1000 tonnes per year. In Trinidad, the species is the basis for several fishing tournaments. Crevalle jack are targeted from boats, as well as from piers and rock walls by land based anglers. Fishermen often target regions where depth suddenly changes, such as channels, holes, reefs or ledges, with strong currents and eddies favourable. The fish take both live and cut baits, as well as a variety of artificial lures; however, when the fish are in feeding mode, they rarely refuse anything they are offered. Popular baits include both live fish, such as mullet and menhaden, as well as dead or strip baits consisting of fish, squid, or prawns. Crevalle jack readily accept any style of lure, including hard-bodied spoons, jigs, plugs and poppers, as well as flies and soft rubber lures. There is some evidence based on long term observations that the species favours yellow lures over all others. Tackle is often kept quite light, but heavy monofilament leaders are employed to prevent the fish's teeth from abrading the line. Crevalle jack are generally considered quite poor table fare, with selection of younger fish and bleeding upon capture giving the best results. The flesh is very red and dark due to the red muscle of the fish, which makes it somewhat coarse and poor tasting. When pulled from the water, this fish snorts in what many people describe as "a pig-like" fashion. The crevalle jack has been implicated in several cases of ciguatera poisoning, although appears less likely to be a carrier than the horse-eye jack.
