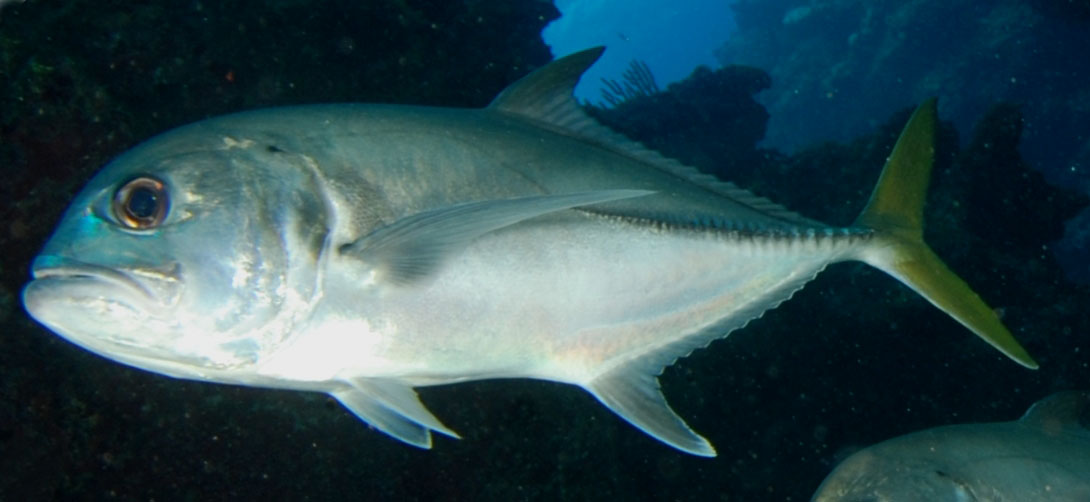
- The horse eye jack, Caranx latus

Scientific classification
- Kingdom: Animalia
- Phylum: Chordata
- Class: Actinopterygii
- Division: Teleostei
- Order: Carangiformes
- Suborder: Carangoidei
- Family: Carangidae
- Subfamily: Caranginae
- Genus: Caranx; Lacépède, 1801

Type species
- Caranx carangua Lacépède, 1801

Species
- See text for species

Synonyms
- List: Tricropterus Rafinesque, 1810; Carangus Girard, 1858; Paratractus Gill, 1862; Elaphrotoxon Fowler, 1905; Vexillicaranx Fowler, 1905; Carangulus Jordan & Evermann, 1927; Xurel Jordan & Evermann, 1927

= Caranx =

Caranx Temporal range: 55–0 Ma Eocene to Present

Genus of fishes

Caranx is a genus of tropical to subtropical marine fishes in the jack family Carangidae, commonly known as jacks, trevallies and kingfishes. They are moderate- to large-sized, deep-bodied fishes which are distinguished from other carangid genera by specific gill raker, fin ray and dentition characteristics. The genus is represented in the Pacific, Indian and Atlantic Oceans, inhabiting both inshore and offshore regions, ranging from estuaries and bays to deep reefs and offshore islands. All species are powerful predators, taking a variety of fish, crustaceans and cephalopods, while they in turn are prey to larger pelagic fishes and sharks. A number of fish in the genus have a reputation as powerful gamefish and are highly sought by anglers. They often make up high amounts of the catch in various fisheries, but are generally considered poor to fair table fishes.

== Taxonomy and naming ==
The genus Caranx is one of 30 currently recognised genera of fish in the jack and horse mackerel family Carangidae, this family are part of the order Carangiformes. The species has long been placed in the subfamily Caranginae (or tribe Carangini), with modern molecular and genetic studies indicating this subdivision is acceptable, and Caranx is well defined as a genus. Phylogenetically, the monotypic genus of Gnathanodon is most closely related to Caranx; and indeed its sole member was once classified under Caranx.

Caranx was created by the French naturalist Bernard Germain de Lacépède in 1801 to accommodate a new species he had described, Caranx carangua (the crevalle jack), which was later found to be a junior synonym of Scomber hippos, which in turn was transferred to Caranx. The early days of carangid taxonomy had over 100 'species' designated as members of the genus, most of which were synonyms, and a number of genera were created which were later synonymised with Caranx. Caranx took authority over these other genera names due to its prior description, rendering the rest as invalid junior synonyms. Today, after extensive reviews of the family, 19 species are considered valid by major taxonomic authorities Fishbase and ITIS, although many other species are unable to be properly validated due to poor descriptions. The fish in the genus are commonly referred to as jacks, trevallies or kingfishes. Like the genus Carangoides, the word Caranx is derived from the French carangue, used for some fishes of the Caribbean.

== Species ==
The 19 currently recognized extant species in this genus are:

Image	Scientific name	Common name	Distribution
	Caranx bartholomaei G. Cuvier, 1833	yellow jack	east coast of the Americas from Massachusetts in the north to Brazil in the south, as well as a number of offshore islands.
	Caranx bucculentus Alleyne & W. J. Macleay, 1877	bluespotted trevally	tropical east Indian and west Pacific Oceans, ranging from Taiwan in the north to Australia in the south.
	Caranx caballus Günther, 1868	green jack	eastern Pacific Ocean along the American coastline from Santa Cruz Island off California in the north to Peru in the south, as well as a number of islands including the Galapagos and recently, Hawaii
	Caranx caninus Günther, 1867	Pacific crevalle jack	tropical waters of the eastern Pacific Ocean from California in the north to Peru in the south
	Caranx crysos (Mitchill, 1815)	blue runner	the Atlantic Ocean, ranging from Brazil to Canada in the western Atlantic and from Angola to Great Britain including the Mediterranean in the east Atlantic
	Caranx fischeri Smith-Vaniz & K. E. Carpenter, 2007	longfin crevalle jack	subtropical waters of the east Atlantic Ocean, ranging along the African coast from Mauritania south at least to Moçamedes in southern Angola, with the species historically present in the Mediterranean Sea.
	Caranx heberi (J. W. Bennett, 1830)	blacktip trevally	the tropical to subtropical Indian and West Pacific Oceans, ranging from South Africa in the west to Fiji, Japan and northern Australia in the east.
	Caranx hippos (Linnaeus, 1766)	crevalle jack	distributed across the tropical and temperate waters of the Atlantic Ocean, ranging from Nova Scotia, Canada to Uruguay in the west Atlantic and Portugal to Angola in the east Atlantic, including the Mediterranean Sea.
	Caranx ignobilis (Forsskål, 1775)	giant trevally	the tropical waters of the Indo-Pacific region, with a range stretching from South Africa in the west to Hawaii in the east, including Japan in the north and Australia in the south
	Caranx latus Agassiz, 1831	horse-eye jack	the subtropical Atlantic ocean from Bermuda and the northern Gulf of Mexico and south to Rio de Janeiro.
	Caranx lugubris Poey, 1860	black jack	the tropical zones of the Pacific, Atlantic and Indian Oceans.
	Caranx melampygus G. Cuvier, 1833	bluefin trevally	the tropical waters of the Indian and Pacific Oceans, ranging from Eastern Africa in the west to Central America in the east, including Japan in the north and Australia in the south
	Caranx papuensis Alleyne & W. J. Macleay, 1877	brassy trevally	range extends from South Africa and Madagascar north along the East African coast
	Caranx rhonchus É. Geoffroy Saint-Hilaire, 1817	false scad	the tropical and temperate waters of the eastern Atlantic Ocean from Namibia in the south to Spain and throughout most of the Mediterranean in the north
	Caranx ruber (Bloch, 1793)	bar jack	western Atlantic Ocean from New Jersey and Bermuda in the north to Venezuela and possibly Brazil in the south, with the largest population in the Gulf of Mexico and West Indies.
	Caranx senegallus G. Cuvier, 1833	Senegal jack	the tropical waters of the eastern Atlantic Ocean, ranging along the west African coast from Angola in the south to Mauritania in the north
	Caranx sexfasciatus Quoy & Gaimard, 1825	bigeye trevally	the Indian and Pacific Oceans
	Caranx tille G. Cuvier, 1833	tille trevally	western part of its range, the species distributed throughout South Africa and Madagascar waters north along the east African coast up to Tanzania, with an apparent break in its range from Tanzania to India. Its range continues from India east to South East Asia and the Indonesian Archipelago. The distribution extends south to northern Australia, north to Japan, and to Fiji in the east
	Caranx vinctus D. S. Jordan & C. H. Gilbert, 1882	cocinero	eastern Pacific Ocean, along the American coastline from Baja California in the north to Peru in the south, possibly including the Gulf of California

== Fossil record ==
The first representative of Caranx found in the fossil record dates back to the mid-Eocene, a period when many modern Perciform lineages appeared. Fossils mostly consist of otoliths, with the bony skeletal material rarely preserved. They are generally found in shallow marine or brackish water sedimentary deposits. A number of extinct species have been definitively identified and scientifically named, including:

- Caranx annectens Stinton, 1980 Eocene, England
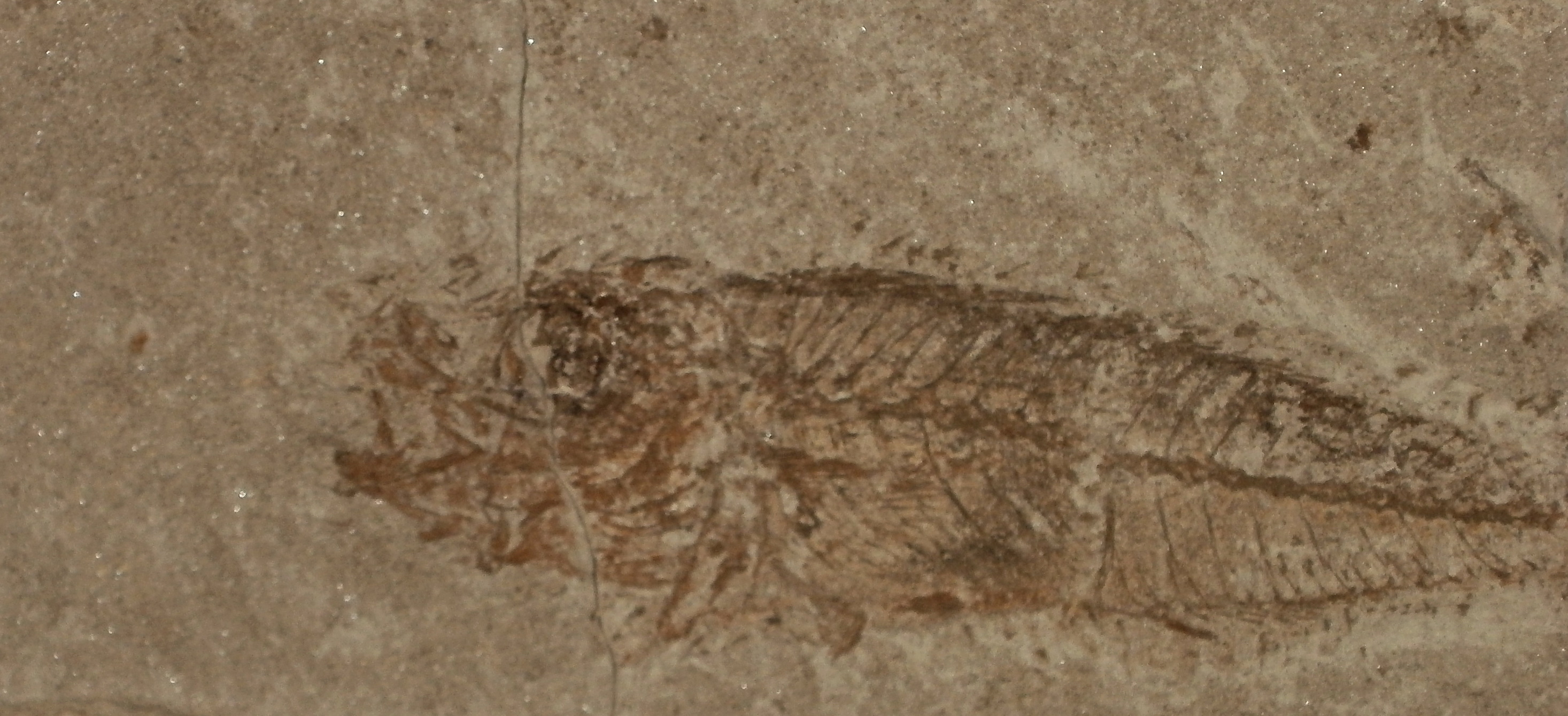
  Caranx gracilis of the Oligocene from the Romanian Eastern Carpathians
- Caranx carangopsis Steindachner, 1859 Cenozoic, Austria
- Caranx daniltshenkoi Bannikov, 1990 Cenozoic, Russia
- Caranx exilis Rueckert-Uelkuemen, 1995 Middle Miocene, Turkey
- Caranx extenuatus Stinton, 1980 Eocene, England
- Caranx gigas Rueckert-Uelkuemen, 1995 Middle Miocene, Turkey
- Caranx gracilis Kramberger, 1882 Oligocene-Lower Miocene, Romania
- Caranx hagni Rueckert-Uelkuemen, 1995 Middle Miocene, Turkey
- Caranx macoveii Pauca, 1929 Oligocene-Lower Miocene, Romania
- Caranx petrodavae Simionescu, 1905 Oligocene-Lower Miocene, Romania
- Caranx praelatus Stinton, 1980 Eocene, England
- Caranx primaevus Eastman, 1904 Eocene, Italy (may be attributable to own genus Eastmanalepes)
- Caranx quietus Bannikov, 1990 Cenozoic, Russia

== Description ==
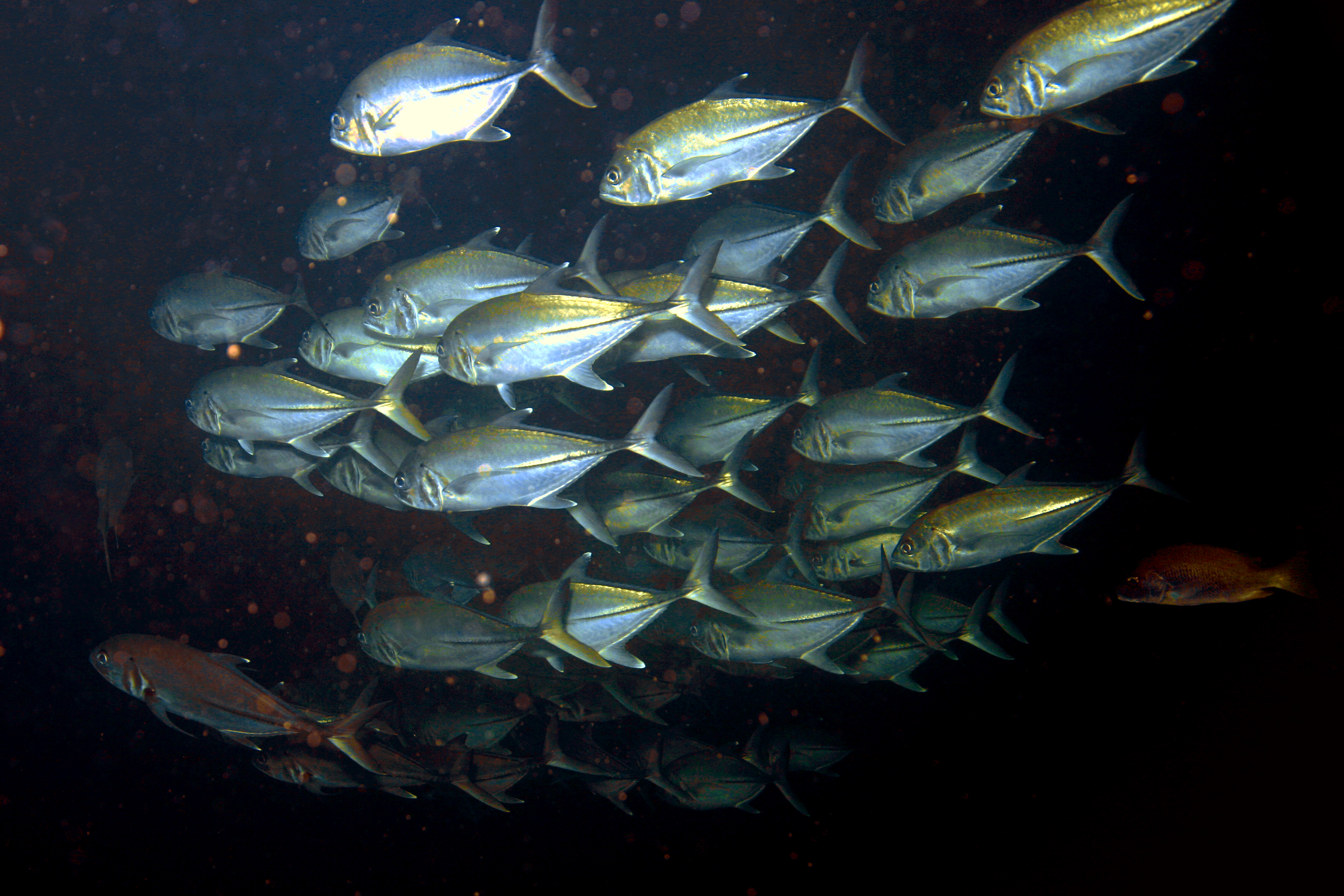
A school of Pacific crevalle jack, Caranx caninus in Panama

The species in the genus Caranx are all moderately large to very large fishes, growing from around 50 cm in length to a known maximum length of 1.7 m and 80 kg in weight; a size which is only achieved by the giant trevally, Caranx ignobilis, the largest species of Caranx. In their general body profile, they are similar to a number of other jack genera, having a deep, compressed body with a dorsal profile more convex than the ventral. The dorsal fin is in two parts, the first consisting of 8 spines and the second of one spine and between 16 and 25 soft rays. The anal fin has one or two detached anterior spines, with 1 spine and between 14 and 19 soft rays. The caudal fin is strongly forked. All species have moderate to very strong scutes on the posterior section of their lateral lines. All members of Caranx are all generally silver to grey in colour, with shades of blue or green dorsally, while some species have coloured spots on their flanks. Fin colours range from hyaline to yellow, blue and black.

The specific characteristics that distinguish the genus relate to specific anatomical details, with these being a gill raker count between 20 and 31 on the first gill arch, 2 to 4 canines anteriorly positioned in each jaw, and dorsal and anal rays which are never produced into filaments as seen in genera such as Alectis and Euprepocaranx.

== Distribution and habitat ==
Species from the genus Caranx are distributed throughout the tropical and subtropical waters of the world, inhabiting the Atlantic, Pacific and Indian Oceans. They are known from the coasts of all continents and islands (including remote offshore islands) within this range, and have a fairly even species distribution, with no particular region having unusually high amounts of Caranx species.

Most species are coastal fish, and very few venture into waters further offshore than the continental shelf, and these species are generally moved by ocean currents. They inhabit a range of environments including sand flats, bays, lagoons, reefs, sea mounts and estuaries. Most species are demersal, or bottom dwelling, in nature, while others are pelagic, moving long distances in the upper water column.

== Biology and fisheries ==
The level of biological information known about each species in Caranx is generally related to how important they are commercially. All species are predatory fish, taking smaller fish, crustaceans and cephalopods as prey. Most species form schools as juveniles, but generally become more solitary with age. Reproduction and growth has been studied in a number of species, with these characteristics varying greatly between species.

All species in Caranx are of at least minor importance to fisheries, but a number are much more so due to their abundance in certain regions. Most are considered to be gamefish, with some such as the giant trevally and bluefin trevally highly sought after by anglers. They are generally considered poor to fair quality table fishes, and have had a number of ciguatera poisoning cases attributed to them.
