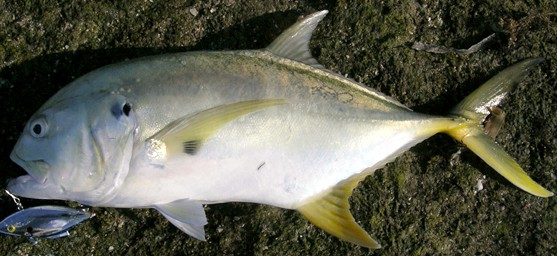

Conservation status
- Least Concern (IUCN 3.1)

Scientific classification
- Kingdom: Animalia
- Phylum: Chordata
- Class: Actinopterygii
- Division: Teleostei
- Order: Carangiformes
- Suborder: Carangoidei
- Family: Carangidae
- Genus: Caranx
- Species: C. caninus

Binomial name
- Caranx caninus (Günther, 1867)
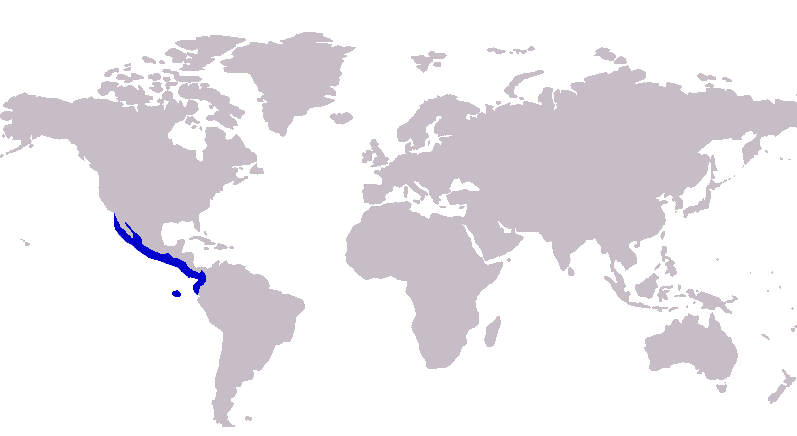
- Approximate range of the Pacific crevalle jack

Synonyms
- Caranx hippos caninus (Günther, 1867)

= Pacific crevalle jack =

Species of fish

The Pacific crevalle jack (Caranx caninus) is a species of large marine fish classified in the jack family Carangidae. The species is distributed through the tropical waters of the eastern Pacific Ocean from California in the north to Peru in the south, including several offshore islands. The species is best identified by its deep body and mostly unscaled breast, as well as other more detailed anatomical features. The species is known to grow to a maximum length of 101 cm and a weight of 19.7 kg. Disagreement on the status of the species has been significant in the scientific literature, with many claiming it to be conspecific with or subspecific to the Atlantic Caranx hippos (crevalle jack). The most recent review of the crevalle jacks strongly concluded it to be a separate species based on the development of hyperostosis and fin colouring. It is predominantly a schooling inshore species, inhabiting sandy and rocky substrates, although larger individuals are occasionally found living pelagically to depths of 350 m. The Pacific crevalle jack is a fast-swimming predator, taking a variety of fish, crustaceans, and other small invertebrates. Spawning is thought to occur year-round, although peaks occur during November and May. The Pacific crevalle jack is an important species to commercial fisheries, with data available from Colima in Mexico indicating it accounts for up to 15% of the entire yearly catch. Pacific crevalle jack are highly rated gamefish, taken by both bait and a variety of lures, but are considered relatively poor quality food.

== Taxonomy and naming ==
The Pacific crevalle jack is classified within the genus Caranx, one of a number of groups known as the jacks or trevallies. Caranx itself is part of the larger jack and horse mackerel family Carangidae, part of the order Carangiformes. The species is part of what William Smith-Vaniz and Kent Carpenter term the Caranx hippos species complex, a group of three closely related and anatomically similar species, which also includes Caranx hippos (Crevalle jack) and Caranx fischeri (Longfin crevalle jack).

The species was first properly scientifically described by the British zoologist Albert Günther in 1867 based on a specimen taken from Panama, which was designated to be the holotype. He named the species Caranx caninus, with the specific epithet meaning 'dog like'. Apart from disagreements pertaining to the possible conspecificity of the species with Caranx hippos, the taxonomy has been very stable, with not one independent redescription and naming. There has, however, been considerable debate in the past as to whether the Pacific crevalle jack is the same species as its Atlantic counterpart, Caranx hippos. To this end it has previously been referred to as C. hippos, and John Nichols argued it was a subspecies, creating the trinomial name Caranx hippos caninus. Yoshio Hiyama also referred the species to a subgenus he created; Tricropterus, creating the name Caranx (Tricropterus) hippos, which is now considered invalid. The most recent review of the species by Smith-Vaniz and Carpenter treated the fish as a separate species, citing differences in the development of hyperostosis and differing anal fin colours as evidence of different species. The species is commonly referred to as the 'Pacific crevalle jack' or 'Pacific jack crevalle' due to its close appearance to the Atlantic 'crevalle jack', as well as a variety of Spanish names.

== Distribution and habitat ==
The Pacific crevalle jack inhabits the tropical to subtropical waters of the eastern Pacific Ocean. The species ranges along the western American coastline from Lobos de Tierra Island, Peru in the south and north to San Diego Bay, California. The species is generally rare north of the Gulf of California, however El Nino events which bring warm tropical waters further north than usual transport Pacific crevalle jack and other species beyond their normal range. All occurrences of the species in San Diego Bay have been attributed El Nino events in that year. The species is also known from several offshore Pacific islands including the Galápagos, Malpelo, Cocos, and Revillagigedo Islands.

The Pacific crevalle jack is most common in coastal regions, although is occasionally found in more pelagic settings, with the species not known to live deeper than 350 m. In coastal waters the species prefers sandy and rocky substrates, including protected bays, lagoons and harbours, where large schools of the species form. Larger individuals are often solitary, and living in deeper offshore environments. Pacific crevalle jack are also common in estuaries, usually as juveniles which preferentially inhabit these environments, but also as adults that make their way into brackish waters and tidal streams. Juveniles are known to penetrate well upstream, indicating a wide salinity tolerance.

== Description ==
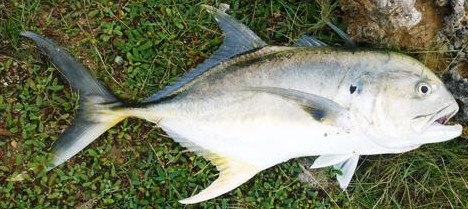
The Pacific crevalle jack is distinguished by yellow anal and caudal fins

The Pacific crevalle jack is a relatively large fish, growing to a maximum recorded size of 101.6 cm in length and 19.7 kg in weight. It is similar to most other jacks of the genus Caranx, having a moderately deep and compressed, oblong body, with the dorsal profile more convex than the ventral profile, particularly anteriorly. The dorsal fin is in two distinct sections; the first consisting of eight spine and the second of one spine and 19 to 21 soft rays. The anal fin consists of two anteriorly detached spines followed by one spine and 16 to 17 soft rays. The pectoral fins are falcate, and consist of 19 to 21 soft rays, while the caudal fin is strongly forked. The species lateral line is moderately arched anteriorly, with 58 to 79 scales in this section, while the straight section contains none to seven scales and 34 to 43 strong scutes. The breast is devoid of scales with the exception of a small patch of scales in front of the pelvic fins. The species has well-developed adipose eyelids, while its dentition consists of an outer row of widely spaced canine teeth and an inner band of villiform teeth in the upper jaw, with a row of widely spaced conical teeth on the lower jaw. The Pacific crevalle jack has 21 to 27 gill rakers and 24 vertebrae. There are significant differences in the development of hyperostosis between this species and C. hippos.

The Pacific crevalle jack is a bluish-green to bluish-black dorsally, fading to a silvery white or golden shade ventrally. Juveniles are generally lighter in colour, also possessing five dark vertical bars on their sides. The fins are all white dusky with the exception of the anal fin and lower caudal fin lobe, which are white to brownish orange, with the ventral surface of the caudal peduncle also this colour. This contrasts to the bright lemon yellow anal and lower caudal fins of C. hippos. The Pacific crevalle jack also has a black spot on the base of its pectoral fins, as well as a dark blotch on the margin of the operculum.

== Biology ==
The Pacific crevalle jack is a schooling fish for much of its life, forming moderate to large aggregations that can move quite rapidly. Older fish tend to be more solitary, moving offshore to greater depths. It is one of the most abundant pelagic species throughout its range, making it both ecologically and economically important. The species is a strong, fast swimming predator that takes predominantly small fish, as well as crustaceans such as prawns and various other benthic invertebrates, although no detailed data on diet has been collected.

Individuals begin reaching sexual maturity at 67 cm in males and 65 cm in females, with reproduction thought to occur year-round. There are peaks in spawning activity however, with these peaks reported as January–February and August in Colombia and May and November in Mexico. The eggs are pelagic, as are the newly hatched larvae. Several studies on yearly growth in the species have given slightly different results, although the maximum difference between these studies is 5 cm per year. After the first year, the species is 19.02 to 20.64 cm long, after the second it is 29.86 to 32.95 cm, and it is 36.8 to 42.44 cm long after the third year. According to the von Bertalanffy growth equations that govern the species growth, the species may live as long as 12 or 15 years, or even 37 years as calculated in one study. These growth equations are generated using the fish's otoliths, which add annual growth rings. These also show yearly periods of slow and fast growth, with August to February having the fastest growth due to the rainy season providing increased runoff and nutrients to the coast. Slowest growth occurs during March to August, although one of the main spawning peaks occurs during this period.

== Commercial fishery ==
The Pacific crevalle jack is of high importance to fisheries throughout its range, with the abundance of the species allowing for large catches by commercial fishermen. Due to the artisanal nature of many Central American fisheries, detailed catch statistics of the species are not kept, making it impossible to estimate total annual catches. Where these statistics are kept, however, it is apparent that it is one of the most important species in its range, with the species accounting for up to 15% of the total annual catch in Colima, Mexico. This translates as around 76 tonnes on average, just for the state of Colima. The species is taken year round by a variety of methods including trawling, fence and fixed nets, as well as hook and line methods.

== Angling ==
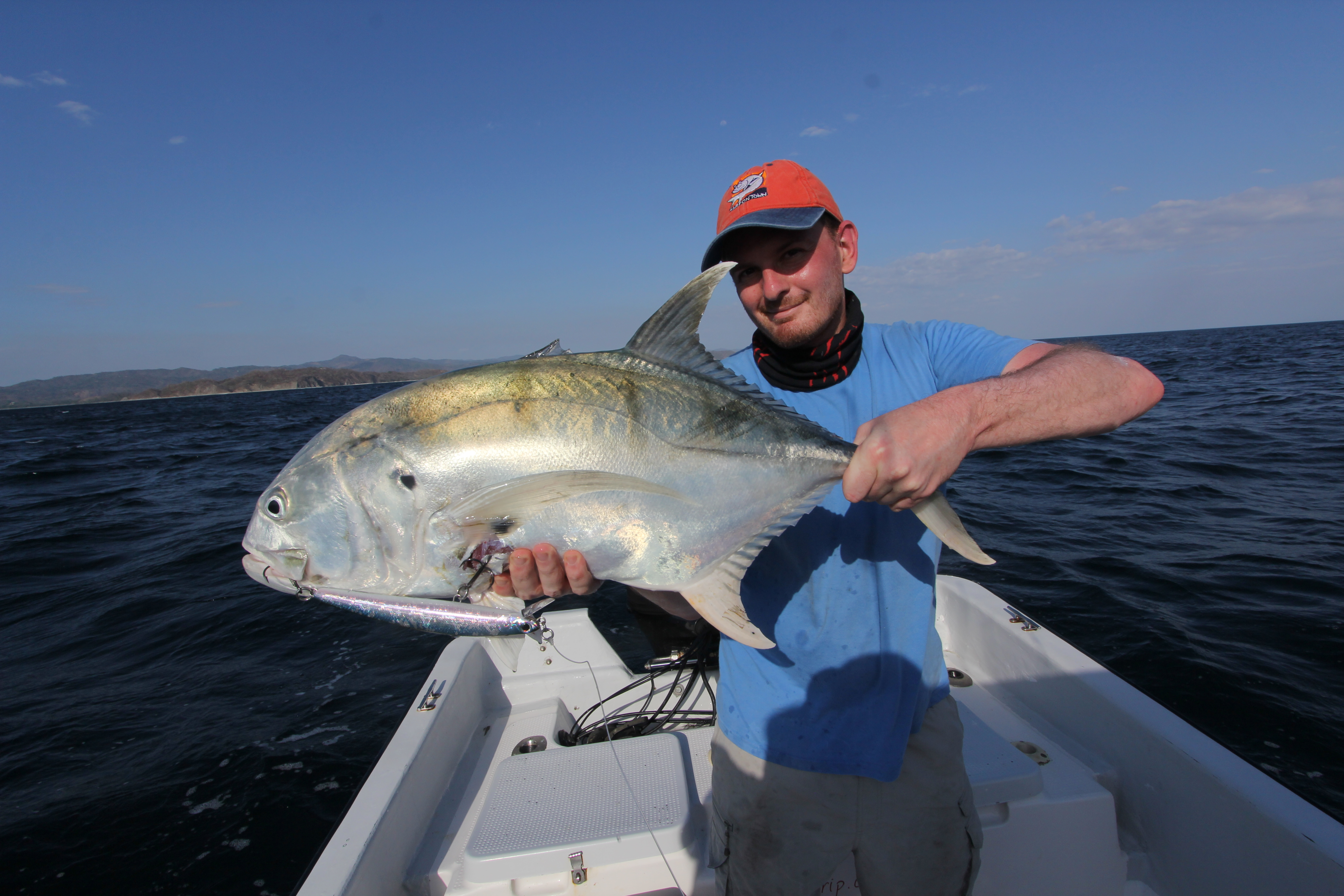
A Pacific crevalle jack caught off Samara, Costa-Rica

The Pacific crevalle jack is also a major target for anglers throughout its range, and can be taken by live bait as well as various lure types including surface poppers and fast retrieved metal slugs and spoons. The IGFA maintains full line class and tipped world records for the Pacific crevalle jack, the current all tackle world record sits at 17.69 kg (39 lb 0 oz) caught off Playa Zancudo, Costa Rica in 1997.

== Use ==
The fish is sold at market either fresh, frozen, smoked, salted or dried, and is also utilized as a source of fishmeal and oil. Despite the large numbers taken, the Pacific crevalle jack is considered a second or third class commercial product, fetching fairly low prices at market. The value of the fish does change throughout its range based on local opinion of the fish.

It is generally viewed as marginal table fare, although bleeding the fish immediately after capture is said to improve the flavor.
