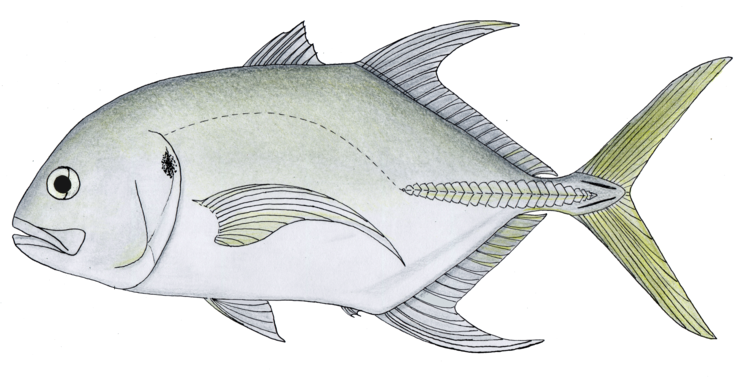

Conservation status
- Least Concern (IUCN 3.1)

Scientific classification
- Kingdom: Animalia
- Phylum: Chordata
- Class: Actinopterygii
- Division: Teleostei
- Order: Carangiformes
- Suborder: Carangoidei
- Family: Carangidae
- Genus: Caranx
- Species: C. fischeri

Binomial name
- Caranx fischeri Smith-Vaniz & K. E. Carpenter, 2007
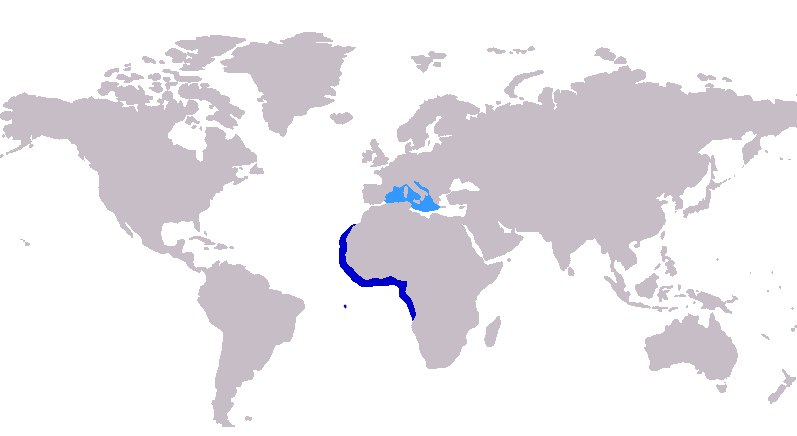
- Approximate range of the longfin crevalle jack. Current range indicated in dark blue, known historical range in light blue

= Longfin crevalle jack =

Species of fish

The longfin crevalle jack (Caranx fischeri) is a species of large marine fish classified in the jack family, Carangidae. It inhabits the subtropical waters of the east Atlantic Ocean, ranging along the African coast from Mauritania south at least to Moçamedes in southern Angola, with the species historically present in the Mediterranean Sea. It is an inshore species, known to occasionally penetrate estuaries, possibly to spawn. The species is very similar to the crevalle jack, Caranx hippos, and is separated by its extended dorsal and anal fin lobes as well as more detailed anatomical features including dorsal and anal fin ray counts. The fish is known to reach 127 cm in length and 20.9 kg in weight. The longfin crevalle jack is a predatory fish, taking small fish as its main prey. Due to longstanding confusion between C. fischeri and C. hippos, the importance of each species to African fisheries is poorly understood, with a known combined catch in this region of between 2,233 and 10,054 tonnes per year in 1995–2004. Like its close relatives, the species is considered a powerful gamefish and highly sought after, although their coarse flesh makes for relatively poor quality food.

== Taxonomy and naming ==
The longfin crevalle jack is classified within the genus Caranx, one of a number of groups known as the jacks or trevallies. Caranx itself is part of the larger jack and horse mackerel family Carangidae, part of the order Carangiformes.

The species belongs to the "Caranx hippos complex" as defined by William Smith-Vaniz and Kent Carpenter, which includes C. fischeri, C. hippos and C. caninus. The identity of the species was entangled with C. hippos until William Smith-Vaniz and Kent Carpenter described the species in full in 2007, anatomically setting it aside from C. hippos. The holotype specimen is derived from a specimen collected in 1978 off Cameroon, and was initially referred to C. hippos. The species has no synonyms due to its recent description, but the species has been misidentified as both C. hippos and C. carangus (now synonymous with C. hippos). The specific epithet is in reference to Dr. Walter Fischer, a former official of the FAO who initiated the Species Identification and Data Program. The naming of the new species was presented at an IGCC and FAO meeting. The species common name as defined by Smith-Vaniz and Carpenter is 'longfin crevalle jack', referring to the extended fin lobes which separates the species from the crevalle jack.

== Description ==
The longfin crevalle jack is large species, growing to a maximum recorded size of 53 cm as measured by Smith-Vaniz and Carpenter in their description. Discussion on the angling merits of the species in the same publication indicate that the species grows significantly larger, recorded up to 127 cm by anglers mistaking it for C. hippos. It has a body profile similar to most of the large species in Caranx, possessing a strongly compressed approximately oblong form. The dorsal profile is much more convex than the ventral profile, with the caudal peduncle quite slender. The dorsal fin is in two parts, the first consisting of 8 spines and the second of 1 spine followed by 21 to 24 soft rays. The dorsal and anal fin lobes are slightly elongated on the species, which distinguishes from the similar crevalle jack. The anal fin consists of 2 detached spines anterior to the main bulk of the fin, which consists of 1 spine followed by 17 to 19 soft rays. The lateral line is moderately arched anteriorly, with this section containing 50 to 73 scales, while the straight section has 0 to 16 scales and 24 to 41 scutes. The breast is devoid of scales up to the origin of the pelvic fins and is separated from the base of the pectoral fins by a narrow band of scales. there are 20 to 25 gill rakers in total and 24 vertebrae.

The longfin crevalle jack is olive to greenish blue in colour dorsally, fading to pale and white ventrally. The dorsal fin dark brown to grey while the anal fin is brownish yellow, becoming white towards the lobe. The caudal fin is brown-yellow and the pelvic fins white. The species has a dark spot both on its opercle and lower pectoral fin rays.

== Distribution and habitat ==
The longfin crevalle jack inhabits the subtropical waters of the east Atlantic Ocean, currently known to range from Mauritania south to at least Moçamedes in southern Angola. Publications describing historical fish specimens collected in the Mediterranean confirm Caranx fischeri was present in this region, although no recent specimens are known. The species appears to be able to travel long distances, with one adult collected from Ascension Island in the mid-Atlantic.

The longfin crevalle jack appears to be primarily an inshore species based the limited data available, although captures such as those in the Ascension Island indicate the species may live pelagically. In the inshore environment they are known from reefs, as well as estuarine environments, possibly penetrating the upper reaches of rivers.

== Habitat and behavior ==
The specifics of the longfin crevalle jack's biology are not known due its recent description and previous confusion with C. hippos. It is clear that all species of crevalle jack are powerful predators, taking a variety of small, schooling fish species including herrings, other carangids and porgies of the family Sparidae. Small jacks, probably including C. fischeri also are known to take invertebrates including shrimps and crabs. Reproduction is poorly known, with spawning possibly occurring in estuaries and rivers.

== Relationship with humans ==
Due to confusion with C. hippos, the species contribution to fisheries is also poorly understood. A combined total of 2233 to 10054 t per year for C. hippos and C. fischeri was recorded from several African countries by the FAO in the 1995 to 2004 interval, indicating it is of moderate importance. Like the other crevalle jacks, the species is a strong gamefish and sought after by anglers in West Africa. Taken by lures or bait, the species is not considered a good table fish, having coarse, tasteless flesh. The IGFA world record stands at 28 kg (61 lb 12 oz) caught off the Loos Islands, Guinea by Daniel Gaillard in 2017, previous records were caught in Angola.
