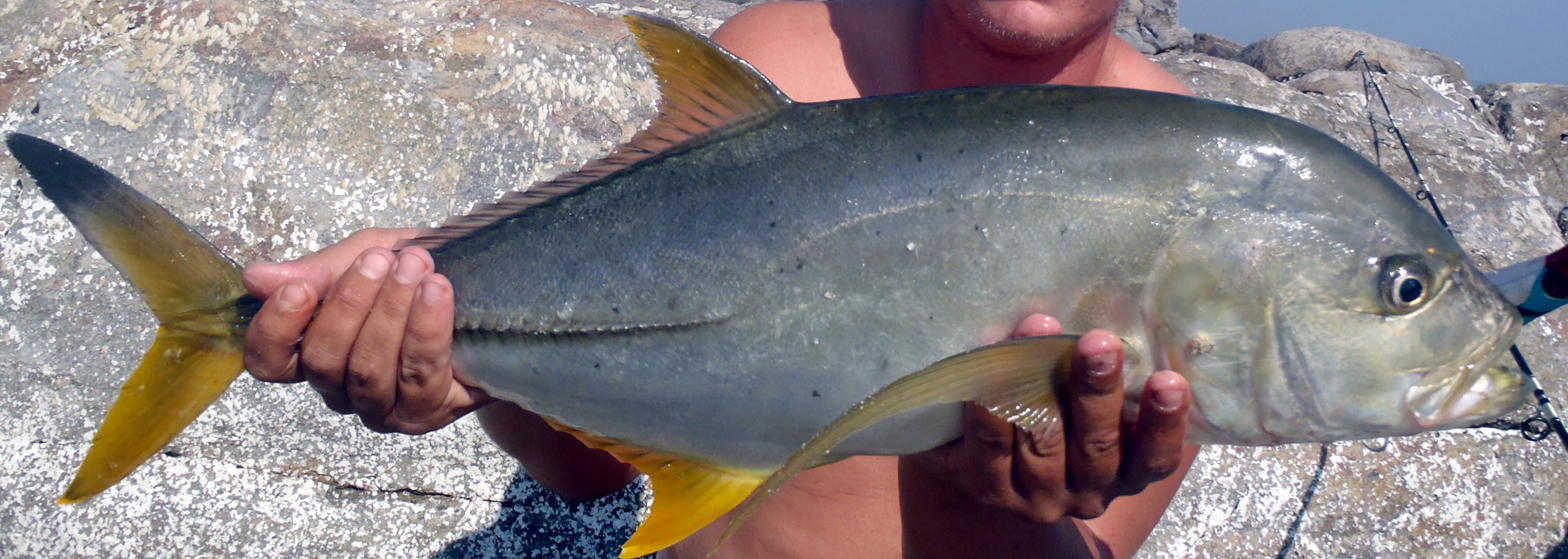

Conservation status
- Least Concern (IUCN 3.1)

Scientific classification
- Kingdom: Animalia
- Phylum: Chordata
- Class: Actinopterygii
- Order: Carangiformes
- Suborder: Carangoidei
- Family: Carangidae
- Genus: Caranx
- Species: C. heberi

Binomial name
- Caranx heberi (J. W. Bennett, 1830)
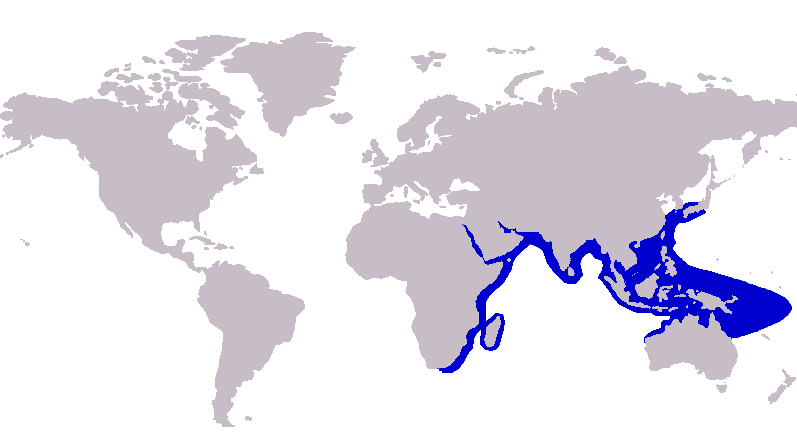
- Approximate range of the blacktip trevally

Synonyms
- Scomber heberi Bennett, 1830; Caranx sem Cuvier, 1833; Caranx williamsi J. L. B. Smith, 1968

= Blacktip trevally =

Species of fish

The blacktip trevally (Caranx heberi), also known as the blacktip kingfish or yellowtail kingfish, is a species of large marine fish classified in the jack family Carangidae. The blacktip trevally is distributed throughout the tropical to subtropical Indian and West Pacific Oceans, ranging from South Africa in the west to Fiji, Japan and northern Australia in the east. It inhabits coastal waters throughout its range, preferring moderately deep clear waters over rocky and coral reefs. The blacktip trevally is easily distinguished by its yellow fins and a dark upper caudal fin lobe which gives the species its common name, as well as a host of other anatomical features. The species is known to reach a maximum size of 1 m. It is a benthopelagic predator, commonly forming small shoals where it takes a variety of fishes, cephalopods and crustaceans as prey. Little is known of reproduction in the species, and spawning is assumed to take place in more tropical regions of its range, with juveniles known to inhabit bays and large estuaries. Blacktip trevally are often caught using hook and line and various nets in commercial fisheries although don't make up a large part of the market. They are also popular with anglers due to their fighting ability and decent table qualities.

== Taxonomy and naming ==
The blacktip trevally is classified within the genus Caranx, one of a number of groups known as the jacks or trevallies. Caranx itself is part of the larger jack and horse mackerel family Carangidae, which in turn is part of the order Carangiformes.

As currently accepted, the species was first scientifically described by John Whitchurch Bennett in 1830 based on the holotype specimen taken from the south coast of Sri Lanka. He named this new species Scomber heberi, placing it in the mackerel genus which at that time was a common genus for placing carangid fishes. The origin of the specific epithet is unclear, with it possibly named after someone or relate to the German word Heber, meaning "lob". With the creation of the genus Caranx, the species was transferred there, where it has remained. There is some confusion over a species described by Peter Forsskål in 1775 under the name Scomber sansun and later transferred to Caranx sansun. This species is still listed as valid by some authorities, although a 1968 review of the taxon by J. L. B. Smith failed to find the holotype and suggested a new name with holotype be introduced to replace it; Caranx williamsi. This name was sunk into C. heberi by William Smith-Vaniz in a major review, indicating C. sansun also should be sunk. Despite this, the name remains valid amongst some authorities. A second, later independent description of the fish by Georges Cuvier produced the name Caranx sem, which became common throughout the literature. Probable synonymy with C. heberi was recognized by Henry Fowler in 1905 and is currently recognized as such due to formal synonymisation by John Randall.

== Distribution and habitat ==
The blacktip trevally is distributed throughout the tropical and subtropical waters of the Indian and West Pacific Oceans. In the western part of its range, the species ranges from South Africa and Madagascar north along the east African coast up to the Persian Gulf and Red Sea. Its distribution continues eastward through India, South East Asia and the Indonesian Archipelago. Its range extends south to northern Australia, north to Japan, and to Fiji in the east.

The blacktip trevally is predominantly an inshore species, frequenting clean open coastal waters as an adult, with juveniles also found in large bays and estuaries. Adults are often found over moderately deep rocky reefs and pinnacles as well as open sandy areas.

== Description ==
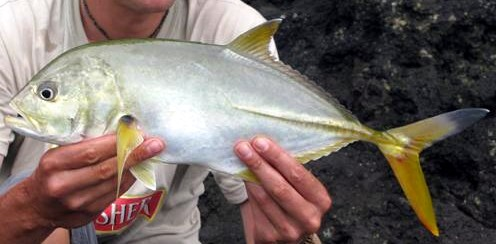
The yellow fins and black caudal fin tip are characteristic of the species

The blacktip trevally is a large fish, growing to a maximum recorded size of 1 m in length and 12.5 kg in weight. It is similar to most other jacks in having a compressed, oblong body, with the dorsal profile much more convex than the ventral profile, particularly anteriorly. The dorsal fin is in two distinct sections; the first consisting of 8 spine and the second of 1 spine and 19 to 21 soft rays. The anal fin consists of 2 anteriorly detached spines followed by 1 spine and 15 to 17 soft rays.

The ventral fin consists of 1 spine and 5 soft rays, while the caudal fin is strongly forked. The species lateral line is moderately arched anteriorly, with 50 to 60 scales in this section, while the straight section contains 0 to 4 scales and 30 to 40 strong scutes. The pattern of breast scales is variable, ranging from fully scaled to naked ventrally. The species has moderately well developed adipose eyelids, while its dentition consists of an outer row of widely spaced canines and an inner band of villiform teeth in the upper jaw and a row of widely spaced conical teeth on the lower jaw. The blacktip trevally has 24 to 27 gill rakers and 24 vertebrae.

The blacktip trevally's colouration is distinctive, with the upper body being dark bronze to yellow green while the lower body fades to silvery white below. The caudal fin is bright to olive yellow, with the top half normally black to dark, giving the species its common name. Other fins range from bright yellow to dusky with little yellow at all. The species also lacks the dark spot on the opercular margin that many related species possess.

== Habitat and behavior ==
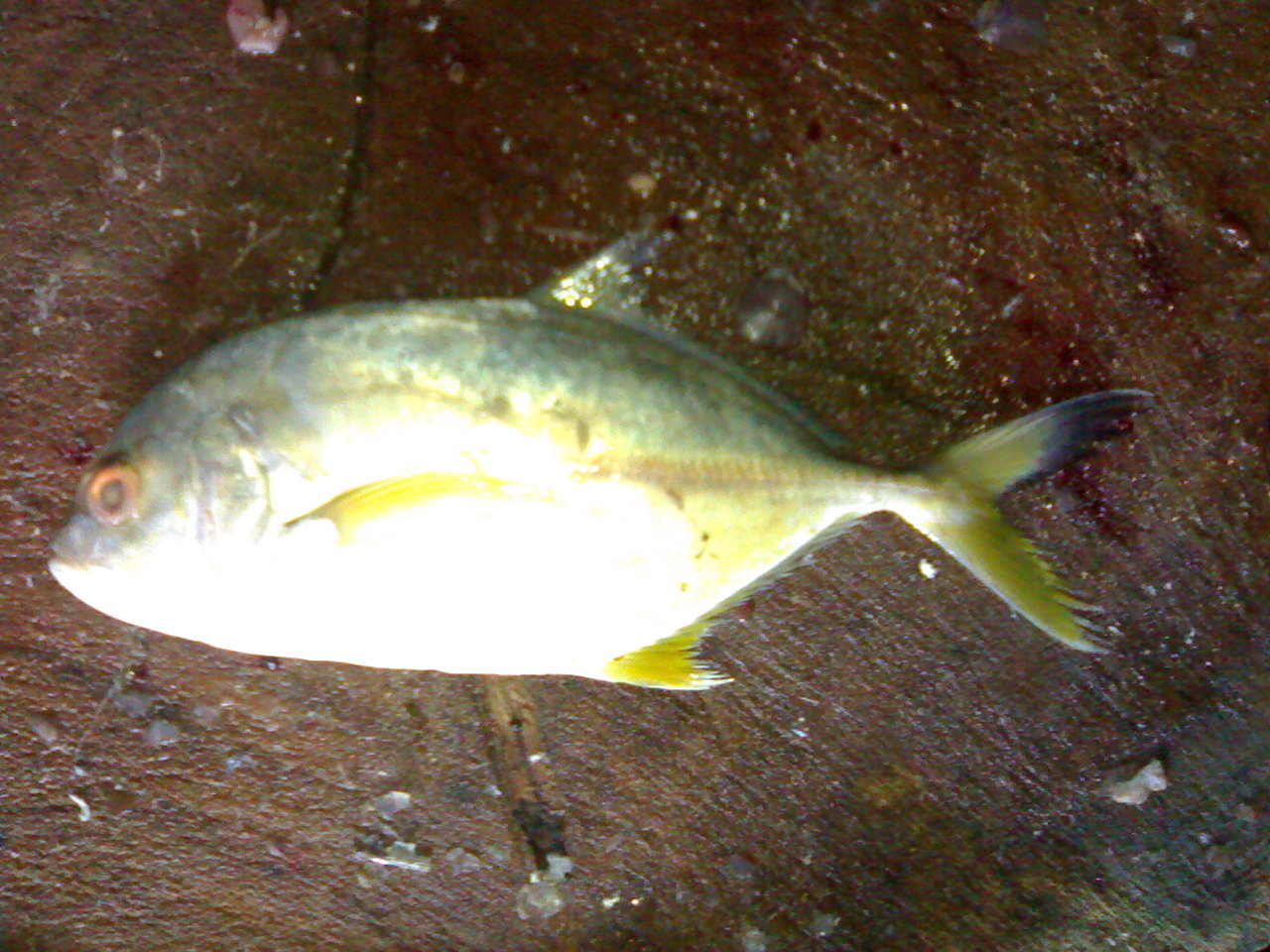
A young blacktip trevally in a Bangalore market

The blacktip trevally travels in both small shoals and individually throughout its habitat, with juveniles more commonly found in shoals. They appear to be migratory, with South Africa recording influxes of the species in summer, while in India they arrive after the monsoons and continue their inhabitance through the cold months. The species is a benthopelagic predator, taking its prey from the sea floor and higher in the water column. Prey items include a variety of fish, cephalopods, and crustaceans including shrimps, mantis shrimps, crabs and crayfish. Reproduction in the species is poorly understood, although observations indicate it spawns in the more tropical regions of its range, with sexual maturity reached at 50 cm.

== Relationship with humans ==
The blacktip trevally is of minor importance to commercial fisheries throughout its range, taken by hook and line and various netting methods, from where it is sold fresh, salted or dried at market. The species is considered a good gamefish and can be taken by fish or squid baits as well as various patterns of lure and fly. When taken from the water, the fish often 'grunt' in similar manner to a young pig. They are considered an excellent table fish despite being known to be a host to parasitic infection in some regions. The IGFA all tackle world record for the species stands at 8.20 kg (18 lb 1 oz) caught off Bazaruto Island, Mozambique in 2008.
