= John Whitchurch Bennett =

John Whitchurch Bennett (28 July 1790 – 10 June 1853) was a British army officer, official and printer, and was also known as a naturalist.

== Life ==
Bennett served in the Royal Marines from 1806 to 1815. He transferred to the British Army in 1815, and in 1816 was posted to Ceylon. He served there to 1827. His rank in 1815 was 2nd lieutenant; he was placed on half-pay in 1819. With a civil service appointment in Ceylon, he served in junior posts, and then was appointed magistrate of the Mahagampattu district, at Galle and Hambantota on the south coast of the island, in 1826.

When in 1827 Bennett left Ceylon, it was under a cloud: he had been accused of financial mismanagement. In 1828 he was again placed on half-pay, for the 3rd Ceylon Regiment.

In 1829 Bennett was listed as a Fellow of the Linnean Society, with a London address in Prospect Place, and given as a Fellow of the Horticultural Society. In 1830 he petitioned Parliament to look into the conduct of Sir Edward Barnes, as Governor of Ceylon. In 1837, he appealed to Sir Alexander Johnston for support.

== Works ==
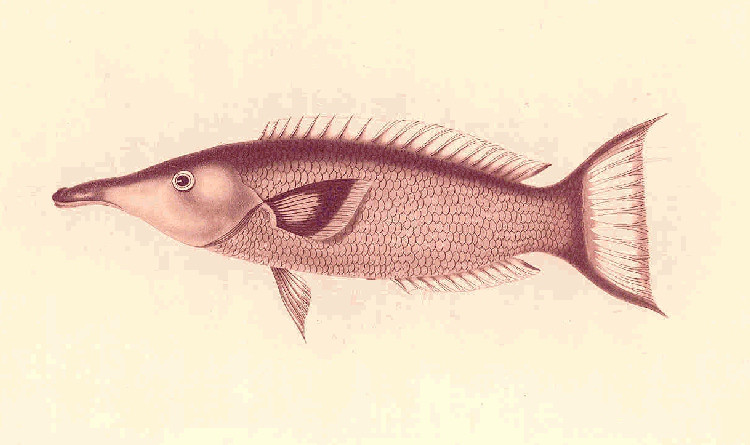
Gomphosus Viridis, from a drawing by John Whitchurch Bennett

Bennett wrote:

- A Selection from the Most Remarkable and Interesting Fishes Found on the Coast of Ceylon (1830). Bennett acknowledges the assistance with the fish of Thomas Hardwicke.
- The Coco-nut Palm, Its Uses and Cultivation (1836)
- Ceylon and Its Capabilities: An Account of Its Natural Resources, Indigenous Productions, and Commercial Facilities (1843). It includes description of a nadagama theatre performance, a Singhalese form derived from the natakam of south India.

== Family ==
Bennett married in 1815 Frances Luttrell Moriarty.

== Taxon described by him ==
- See Category:Taxa named by John Whitchurch Bennett
