= Hyperostosis =

Excessive bone growth

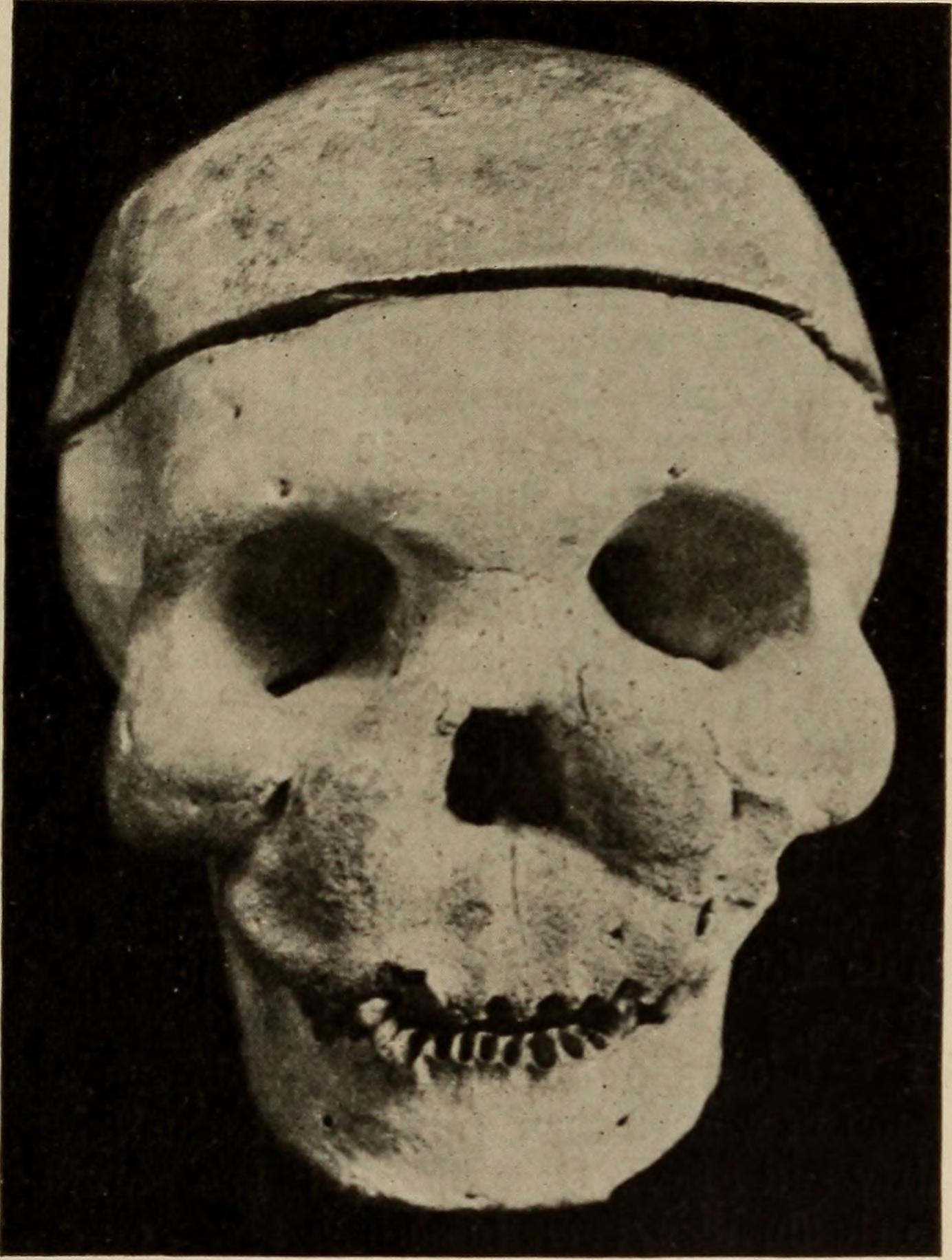
- A human skull showing hyperostosis
- Specialty: Rheumatology

Hyperostosis is an excessive growth of bone. It may lead to exostosis. It occurs in many musculoskeletal disorders and from use of drugs like Isotretinoin.

Disorders featuring hyperostosis include:

- Camurati-Engelmann disease, type 2
- Hypertrophic osteoarthropathy, primary, autosomal recessive, 2
- Melorheostosis
- Tumoral calcinosis, hyperphosphatemic, familial, 1
- Worth disease

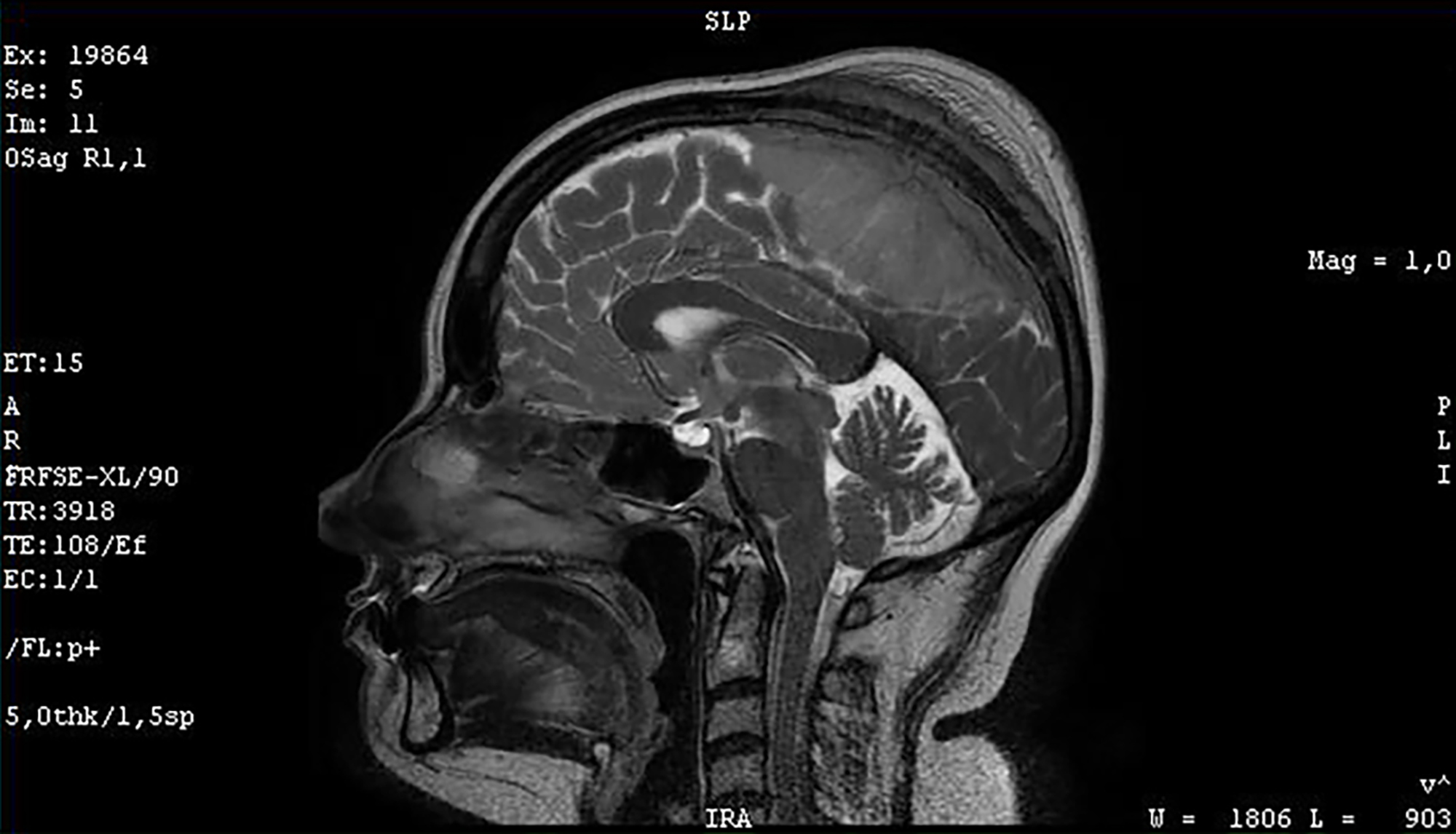
Meningioma of the middle third of the sagittal sinus with large hyperostosis

== See also ==
- Diffuse idiopathic skeletal hyperostosis
- Hyperostosis frontalis interna
- Infantile cortical hyperostosis
- Porotic hyperostosis
- SAPHO syndrome
