= Pierre-Georges Jeanniot =

French painter (1848–1934)

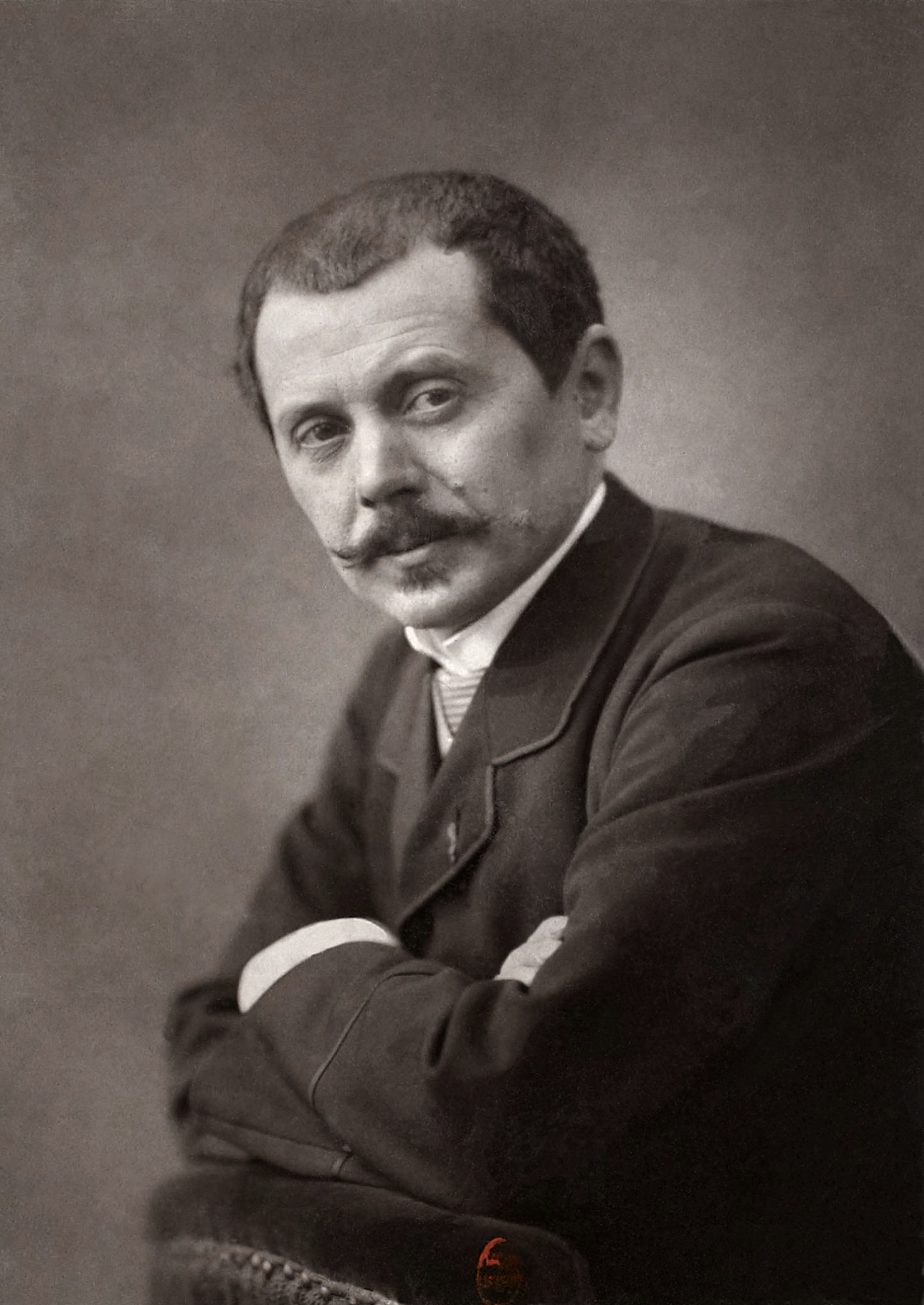
Pierre-Georges Jeanniot

Pierre-Georges Jeanniot (English: /ʒæniˈoʊ/ zhæ-nee-OH, French: [pjɛʁ ʒɔʁʒ ʒanjɔ]; 1848–1934) was a Swiss-French Impressionist painter, designer, watercolorist, and engraver who was born in Geneva, Switzerland, and died in France. His work often depicts the modern life in Paris.

== Biography ==
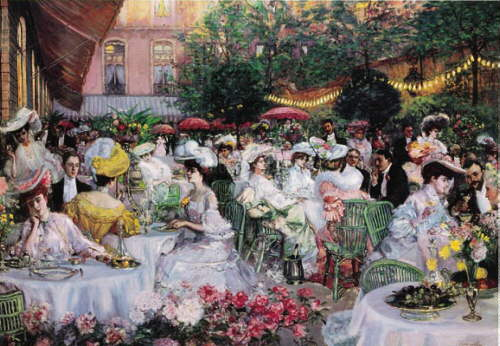
The Ritz garden café, Paris, France

The artistic education of Pierre-Georges Jeanniot began with his father, Pierre-Alexandre Jeanniot (1826–1892), a longtime director of l'École des Beaux-Arts of Dijon, France.

Pierre-Georges Jeanniot started out pursuing a military career, as an infantry officer (1866–1881). He was a lieutenant with the Twenty-third Infantry from 1868 to 1870. He fought in the Franco-Prussian War, was wounded at Rezonville, and was awarded the Légion d'Honneur. He subsequently served with the Ninety-fourth Infantry and the Seventy-third Infantry. At the time he left the army he held the rank of major, with the Chasseurs à Pieds.

He never ceased drawing. He was known for the first time in 1872 at the art exhibition Salon de Paris, where he presented a watercolor painting called Intérieur de forêt. The next year he presented the painting Le Vernan à Nass-sous-Sainte-Anne. From then on he was a regular contributor to the Salon de Paris, where he presented new works with views of Toulouse, Paris, Troyes, the edges of the Seine, and some portraits.

In 1881, after the army offered him the rank of commandant, he resigned to devote himself exclusively to painting. He took up residence in Paris. His works from this period represent mainly scenes of military life that allowed him to forge a reputation. Jeanniot established himself permanently in 1882 and obtained his first award the following year (medal third class of the Salon de Paris) with his les Flanqueurs (1883, Musée du Luxembourg). In 1886, La ligne de feu, souvenirs de la bataille de Rezonville, remembering the Battle of Mars-La-Tour (Museum of Pau), assured his notoriety.

From then on, he started to show a certain artistic independence. He then mostly portrayed Parisian women during the "Belle Epoque", women in bathing suits on the beaches (a new phenomenon in those times) or scenes on the race course. These paintings give us a vivid sociological portrayal of his times. But as soon as the Société Nationale des Beaux-Arts was founded in 1899, he rallied to their new painting trend.

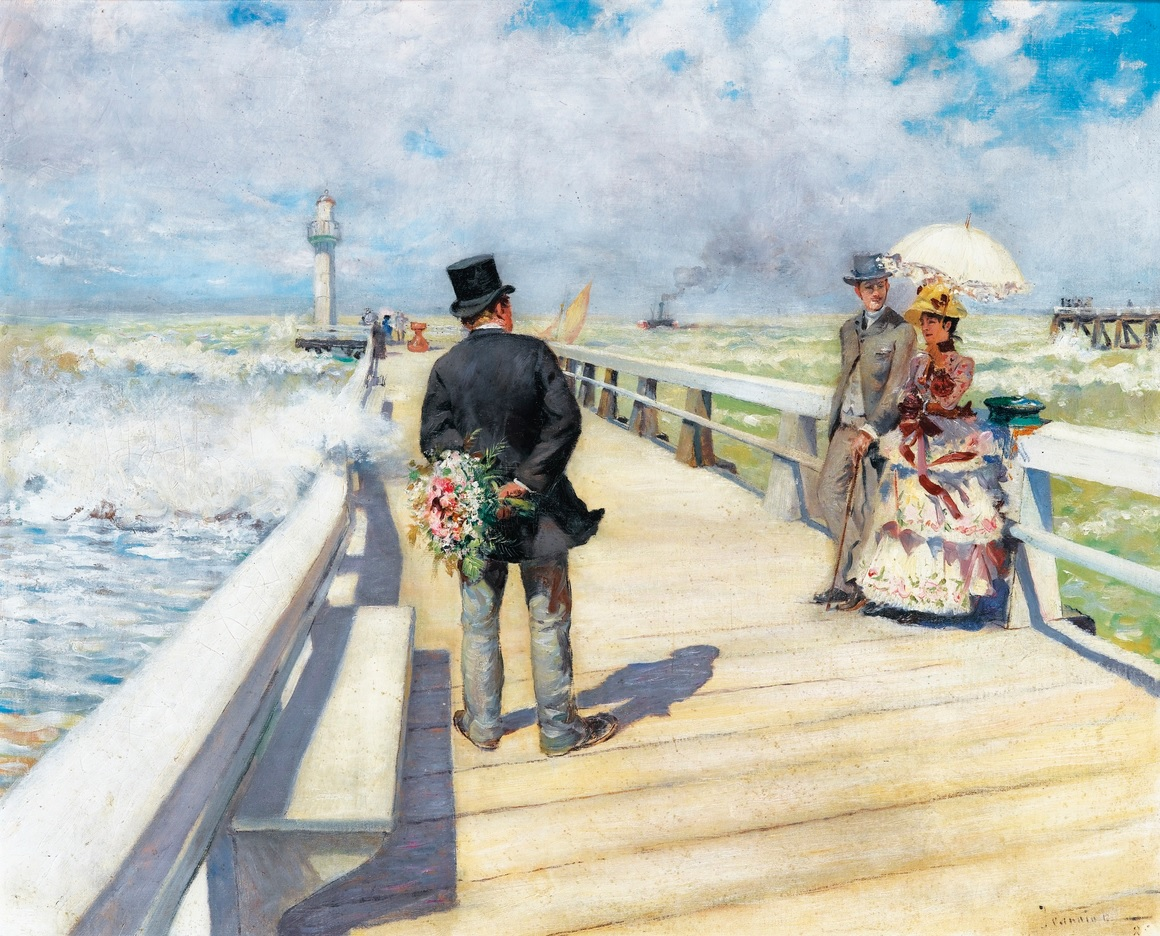
The Walk on the Piers, 1880s, Private Collection

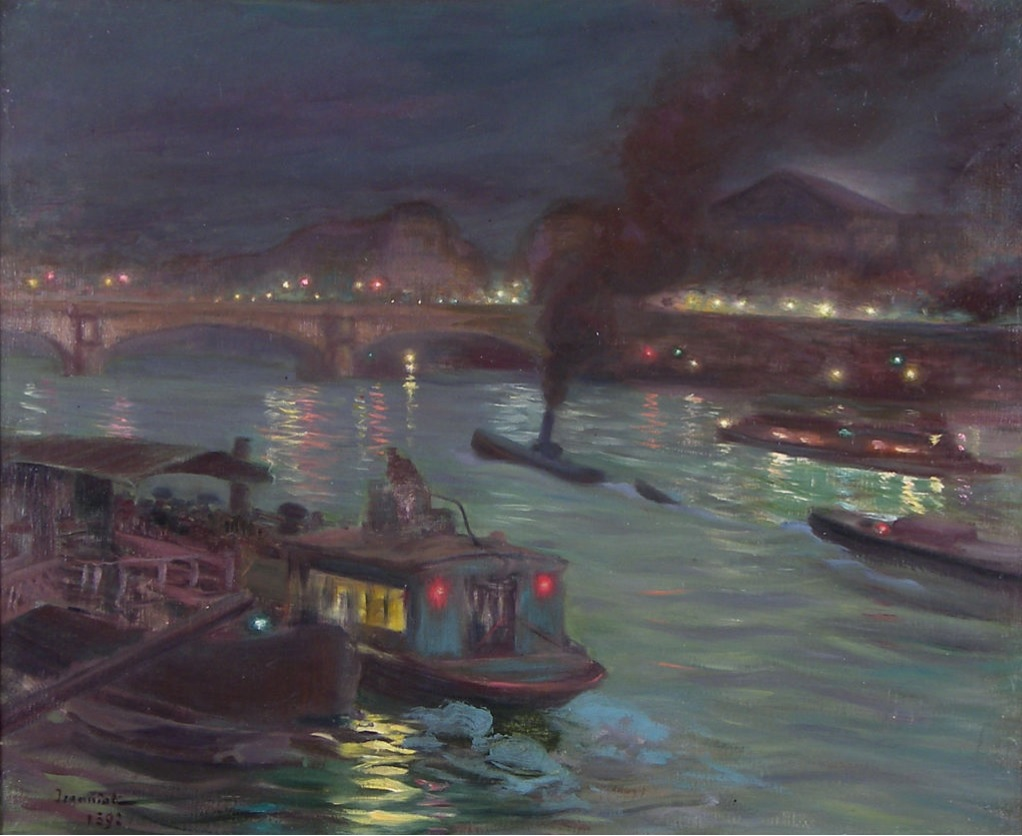
View of Seine by Night, 1892, Private Collection

In Paris, he secured himself friendships and memories of Édouard Manet, Pierre Puvis de Chavannes, Jean-Louis Carnival, Paul Helleu, and especially with Edgar Degas, whom he revered as a master. He spent much time with Edgar Degas in his family home in Diénay (Côte-d'Or).

He was gifted with many talents and also excelled with his drawings. He showed in his drawings his passion and his artistic strength. They are vivacious, expressive and enthusiastic, while at the same time, rendering with a sense of humour the picturesque scenes of daily life. During the next decades he illustrated a large number of literary books, among them Le Voyage à Saint-Cloud, Germinie Lacerteux (1886), Contes choisis" (Guy de Maupassant, 1886), Tartarin de Tarascon (Daudet, 1887), "Les Liaisons dangereuses" (Pierre Choderlos de Laclos, 1917). He was also one of the illustrators of Les Misérables (Victor Hugo, 1887), La Débâcle et La Curée (Émile Zola, 1893–1894), Le Calvaire (Octave Mirbeau, 1901), Le Misanthrope (Molière, 1907), Les Paysans (Honoré de Balzac, 1911), and Candide (Voltaire) and many more.

He was one of the first collaborators (together with Théodore de Banville, Alphonse Daudet and Giuseppe De Nittis) of the review La Vie Moderne and also contributed to the review La Lutte Moderne. In a later stage he became the director of Journal amusant, while also offering contributions to Rire and L'Écho de Paris.

As an engraver, he also sketches ironic scenes from the daily life depicting in lively traits the snobs of Paris. His talents suggest a resemblance to the works of Toulouse-Lautrec and Mary Cassatt. At the same time he also used the woodcut printing technique allowing vivid contrasts between dark and bright parts of the image.

His works can be found in many museums, though most are situated in France (Alais, Nancy, Paris, Carnavalet, Pau, Toul and Toulouse), but some in other countries (Oslo, New York, Buenos Aires).

== List of honours ==
- 1882: Honourable mention, Salon de paris
- 1884: Third-class medal, Salon de Paris
- 1889: 1900: Silver medal, Salon de Paris
- 1906: Chevalier in the Legion of Honour

== Recent exhibitions ==
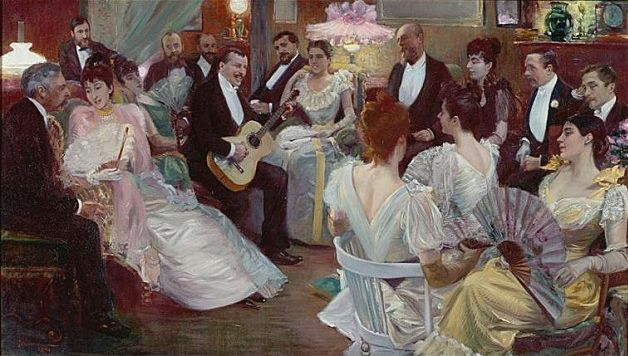
Une chanson de Gibert dans le salon de madame Madeleine Lemaire, 1891, La Piscine Museum

- 2015: "Edgar Degas: The Private Impressionist", The Frick Art & Historical Center
- 2015: "Toulouse-Lautrec and the Post-Impressionists", Arlington Museum of Art, Arlington, Texas
- 2015: "Toulouse-Lautrec and La Vie Moderne: Paris 1880-1910", Crocker Art Museum, Sacramento
- 2014: "Toulouse-Lautrec and La Vie Moderne: Paris 1880-1910", Art Gallery of Alberta, Edmonton
- 2014: "Tea and Morphine. Women in Paris, 1880-1914", Hammer Museum, Los Angeles
- 2013: "Toulouse-Lautrec and La Vie Moderne: Paris 1880-1910", Nevada Museum of Art, Reno
- 2012/2013: "Le Nu", Musée d'Orsay, Paris
- 2012: "Modern Women. Daughters and Lovers 1850-1918", Queensland Art Gallery, Brisbane
- 2010: "Femmes peintres et salons au temps de Proust", Musée Marmottan Monet, Paris
- 2010: "The Modern Woman. Drawings by Degas, Renoir, Toulouse-Lautrec and other Masterpieces form the Musée d'Orsay", Musée d'Orsay, Paris and Vancouver Art Gallery, Vancouver
- 2007: "Des toiles, des voiles, l'île d'Yeu sous le regard des peintres", Historial de la Vendée, Vendée
- 1996: "Degas beyond Impressionism", National Gallery, London and Art Institute of Chicago
- 1990: "De Manet à Matisse, 7 ans d'enrichissement au musée d'Orsay", Musée d'Orsay, Paris

== Museums ==
- Albertina, Vienna
- Art Institute of Chicago
- Clark Art Institute
- Dahesh Museum of Art, New York
- Fine Arts Museum of San Francisco
- Finnish National Gallery, Helsinki
- Harvard University Art Museums
- Louvre
- McNay Art Museum, San Antonio
- Metropolitan Museum of Art
- Minneapolis Institute of Arts
- Musée d'Orsay
- Museum of Fine Arts, Boston
- National Gallery of Art Washington
- Smithsonian American Art Museum
- The Baltimore Museum of Art

== Selected works ==
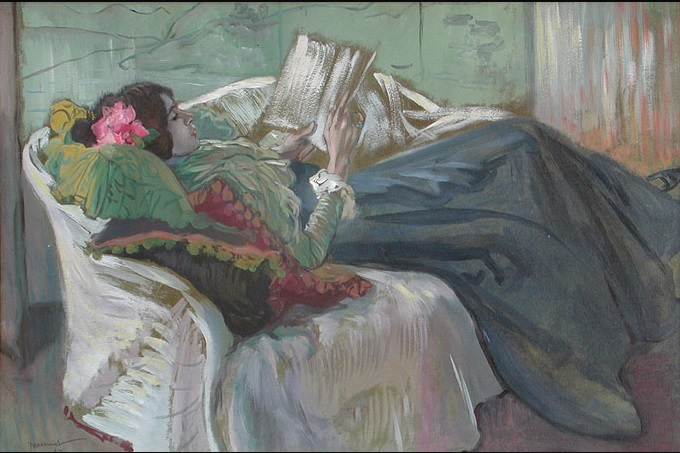
The Pink Camelia, 1897, Private Collection

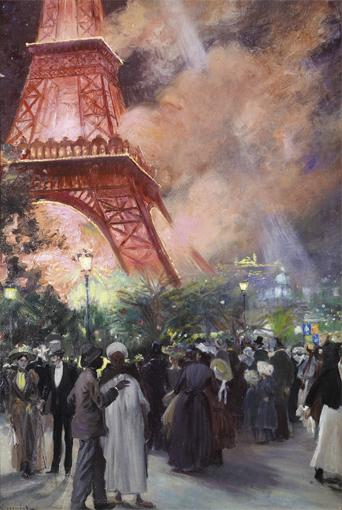
Exposition Universelle (1889), 1889, Private Collection

- Partie de Polo, oil on canvas, 1920 (sold in 1997 for 40,000 FRF)
- Le Vaguemestre, lithograph, 1915
- Paysage de la campagne et du village de Villecomte, oil on canvas, 1909
- Femme au rive de la rivière, oil on canvas, 1908 (sold in 1993 for 6,325 USD)
- Après le bain, etching, 1908
- La lecture, oil on paper remounted on panel, 1906 (sold in 1990 for 6,800 FRF)
- Le Dîner à l'Hotel Ritz, oil, 1904
- L'introduction, watercolour, 1902
- Femme assise dans un parloir, oil on canvas, 1905 (sold in 1995)
- Au tailleur, oil on canvas, 1901 (sold in 1987 for US$8,000)
- Le Buveur d'Absinthe, etching and pencil, 1900
- La Place de la Concorde vue du Jardin des Tuileries, oil on panel, 1900
- Spectateurs au Polo, etching, 1900
- Scène de café, 1892 (sold in 1985 for US$2,800)
- Nuit sur la Seine, oil on canvas, 1892
- Barques en Automne, pastel on paper, 1891
- Portrait d'Edgar Degas, etching, 1891 (sold in 1994 for 3,500 FRF)
- Place de la Concorde enneigée, watercolour heightened with gouache, 1888 (sold in 1983 for 500 GBP)
- Partie de Polo, oil on canvas, 1887 (sold in 1977 for 5,000 FRF and in 1995 for 100,000 FRF))
- Germaine Larceteux, book illustration, 1886
- Prise d'armes, Place des Invalides, 1883 (sold in 1942 for 2,000 FRF)
- Les Flanqueurs, watercolour, 1882, Musée du Luxembourg
- La ligne de feu, 16 août 1870, oil on canvas, 1886
- La charge des cuirassiers à Waterloo, drawing (sold in 1895 for 60 FRF)
- Vieux paysan limousin (sold in 1920 for 400 FRF)
- Chez la modiste (sold in 1925 for 190 FRF)
- L'arrivée du mailcoach au château, watercolour (sold in 1929 for 900 FRF)
- L'Arlequin, charcoal and wash drawing (sold in 1941 for 1,300 FRF)
- La partie de billard (sold in 1943 for 4,700 FRF)
- Portrait d'homme (sold in 1945 for 1,700 FRF)
- Jeune femme, drawing (sold in 1946 for 2,500 FRF)
- Femme dans un intérieur, watercolour (sold in 1948 for 9,000 FRF)
- Galopeurs sur le champs des courses, oil on panel, (sold in 1995 for 35,000 FRF)
- Elégantes au jardin, wash, charcoal and gouache (sold in 1997 for 1,000 FRF)
- En fiacre, charcoal and wash (sold in 1997 for 1,350 FRF)
- Elegante conversation, wash, gouache and watercolour (sold in 1997 for 1,600 FRF)
- Trois élégantes dans une chairière, wash, watercolour, gouache, charcoal and pencil (sold in 1997 for 1,800 FRF)
- Paris, oil on canvas (sold in 1997 for 2,000 FRF)

== Publications ==
- Le Rire, la morale avant tout, Éditions Tonnelle, 1899
