= Charles Nicolas Lacretelle =

French general and statesman

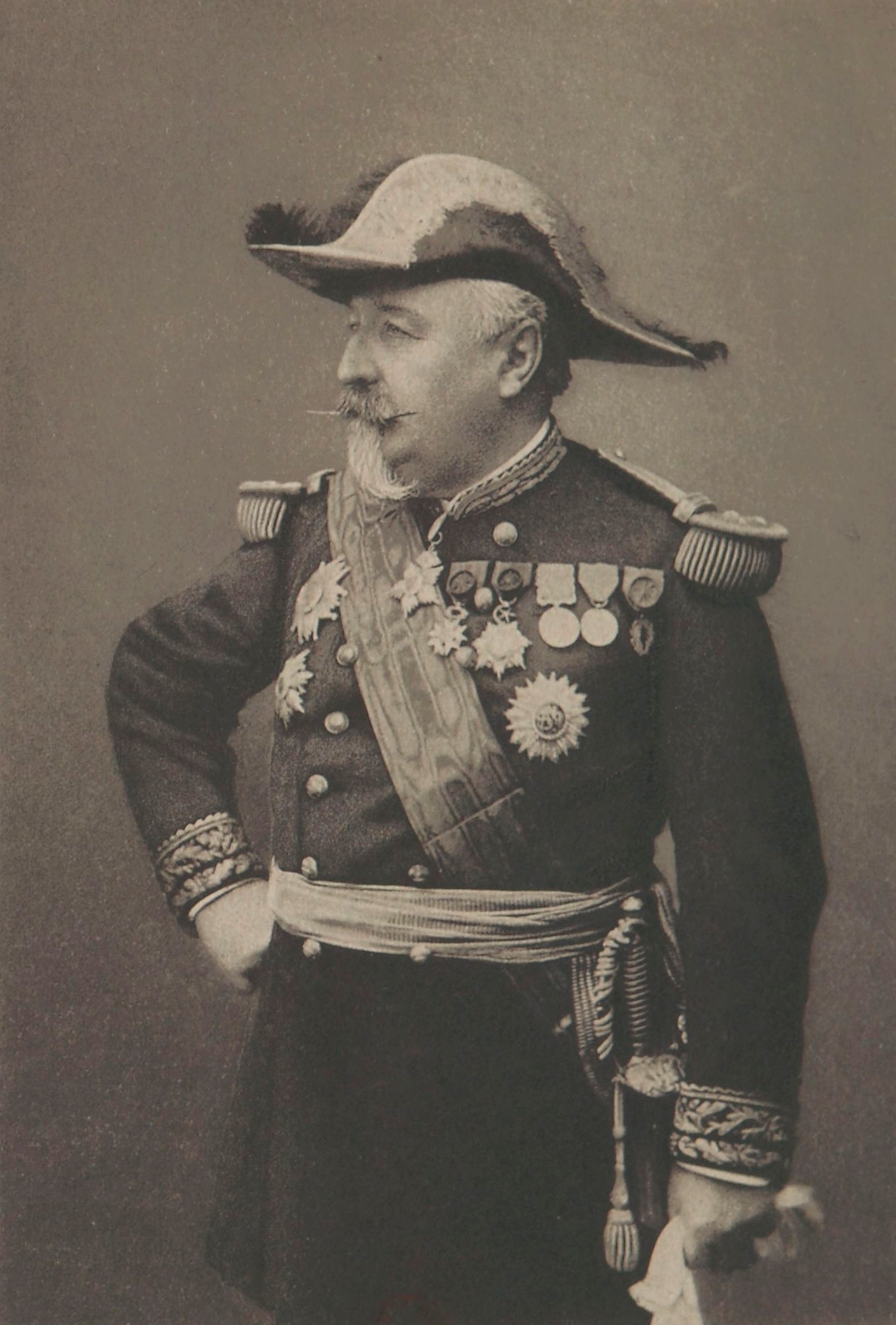
Charles Nicolas Lacretelle

Charles Nicolas Lacretelle (1822–1891) was a French general and statesman born in Pont-à-Mousson (Meurthe-et-Moselle, France) on 30 October 1822.

== Military career ==
Charles Nicolas entered the Promotion de la Nécéssité at the French military academy of École spéciale militaire de Saint-Cyr on 20 April 1841. After graduating on 1 April 1843, he joined as lieutenant the French Foreign Legion.

- 1st Algerian Campaign – He was sent to the Oran Division (Algeria) near Sidi Bel Abbès, where many of his siblings lived at the time. In 1852 after the battle of the Tigre, he received from the Minister of War, Maréchal Saint-Arnaud a citation for his courage in combat. Promoted instantly to the rank of Captain he was awarded the Knighthood of the Légion d’Honneur.
- 1st Russian Campaign – During the Crimean War in June 1854, he was part of the Bataillon Etranger (French Foreign Battalion) detached to the Canrobert Division and took part in the Battle of Alma. After being wounded at Lukermann, he was promoted Battalion Commander at the 2nd Zouave Regiment and became Officer of the Légion d’Honneur. Wounded again on 18 June 1855 (Affaire Malakoff) he was on 30 June promoted to the rank of lieutenant colonel at the 19th Line Infantry Regiment. On 30 December 1857, he became Colonel of the 31st Line Infantry Regiment.
- Italian Campaign – In 1859 Colonel Lacretelle was transferred to the Zouave Regiment of the Guard and took part in the Campagne d'Italie (1859). He was awarded the title of Commander of the Légion d’Honneur on 12 August 1861. Lacretelle was promoted to the rank of Brigadier General on 13 August 1865.
- 2nd Algerian Campaign – In 1866, General Lacretelle was again sent back to North Africa to take command of the operations in the South of Algeria.
- 1870–71 War – Attached to the 4th Division of the 1st Army Corps under the command of Marechal Mac-Mahon, he was commander of the "Le Mans" Sub-Division in 1870 and took part in the battle of Frœschwiller, where his Brigade was only composed of the 3rd Tirailleur Algérien Regiment. During this battle, he occupied the extreme right flank of the French forces next to Morsbronn, well known for the Charges of the 8th and 9th Cuirassier and the 6th Lancer Regiments. Being promoted Général de Division on 23 August, he took command of a 12th Corp Division in Sedan.
- Aftermath – After the capitulation of France at Sedan on 2 September 1870, General Lacretelle was held prisoner in Germany. Upon his return to France, he took command of the 3rd Division of the Versailles 2nd Army Corps during the second Siege of Paris and took part of the Military Operations against the Commune. He later participated to the reorganization of the Army while commanding the 19th Division (2nd Army Corps). For his services, he was awarded the title of "Grand Officier" of the Légion d’Honneur on 21 April 1874 before retiring from active duty.

== Political career ==
1888–1891 – Mayor of Beaucouzé (Council of Angers) and Deputy of Maine-et-Loire, France

Lacretelle was elected deputy of Maine-et-Loire by a large majority 61,782 votes against 29,542 (for David d’Angers) and 12.015 (for the General Boulanger) on 26 February 1888. Taking place at Right Royalist wing on the French Parliament, he took an active part in the legislation regarding the new Military Law and proposed the indefinite adjournment of a Revision of the French Constitution. He also was a fervent opponent against:

- The establishing of the voting by district proposed system on 11 February 1889
- The legal pursuits against the three deputies of the Ligue des Patriotes
- The proposed lawsuit against General Boulanger
- The Eugene Lisbonne Law Project defining the freedom of press

He was re-elected in the Baugé circumscription at the second round of the general election on 6 October 1889.

Note: Lacretelle's political and military career was well officially documented by the Biographie de Charles Nicolas Lacretelle extraite du dictionnaire des parlementaires français de 1789 à 1889 (A.Robert et G.Cougny)

== Private and public life ==
His father Louis François-Marie Lacretelle (1784–1859) was a colonel during the 1st French Empire and a hero of the Napoleonic Wars during the Sieges of Zaragoza in 1808 and 1809. He was swarded the ranks of officer of the Légion d'Honneur and the Knighthood of the Order of St-Louis. He married Adelaide Duhem (1799–?) giving birth to four children:

1. Louis Nicolas Lacretelle (1818–1887)
2. Nicolas Eugène Lacretelle (1821–1859)
3. Charles Nicolas Lacretelle (1822–1891)
4. Clémentine Lacretelle

Lacretelle was a lieutenant colonel when he married Valérie Marie Guilhem (1835–1912) on 18 May 1857. Some years later, one of his best friends General Émile Armand Gibon (1813–1870) was wounded in action and died the following days. Charles Nicolas and his wife decided to adopt the General's children, Louis Charles Emile Gibon-Guilhem (1862–1945) and Laure Helen Marguerite Gibon (1869–1957) who later became part of his family when she married their nephew Charles Louis Lacretelle (1859–1915) the son of his brother Louis Nicolas on 26 January 1891. As Mayor of Beaucouzé he personally recorded the birth of their daughter Marie-Valérie on 1 November 1891 just days before he died.

Charles Nicolas Lacretelle was also known to be severe but fair, friendly and distant as conditions required with his soldiers and colleagues. He corresponded regularly in several languages when necessary (French, German, Italian, Arabic and English). When out of duties, he loved to spend most of his free time with his family riding or wine testing as well as restoring his chateau near Angers but mostly writing books. Probably due to his past military wounds, Lacretelle's health was deteriorating. He died in his "Chateau de Molière" on 14 November 1891 at the age of 69.

His name was given to several French streets of which:

- Rue du Général Charles Lacretelle in Beaucouzé (49)
- Rue Lacretelle in Mâcon

== Bibliography ==
As well as political publications, Lacretelle published several books and essays. One of his books published in 1868 was De l'Algérie au point de vue de la crise actuelle. "

During his last years, and with the help of Marie de Sardent, he also wrote his memoirs which were published after his death in 1907 (with a misspelled first name) by Emile-Paul Editions.

== Lacretelle Family ==
Charles Nicolas Lacretelle was part of a large family which took his ancient origins in Sweden. The first French recorded family member was Nicolas Lacretelle born in 1659. The family has since produced French magistrates and statesmen as well as military commanders, poets and writers. From genealogy researches made by his most directly related descendant (3 times great nephew) Geoffroy Gaillard de Saint Germain, it is now possible to establish parenthood with some other famous members of the Lacretelle family such as:

- Jean-Charles Dominique de LACRETELLE (Charles's third cousin, once removed). French historian and Journalist (1766–1855)
- Pierre-Louis Lacretelle (Charles's third cousin, once removed) French lawyer, politician and writer (1751–1824).
- Jacques de Lacretelle (Charles's fourth cousin, twice removed). French Novelist (1888–1985)
