= Éden-Théâtre =

Former theatre and cinema in rue Boudreau, Paris, France

- Éden-Théâtre (1883–1890); Théâtre Lyrique (1890); Grand Théâtre (1892–1893)
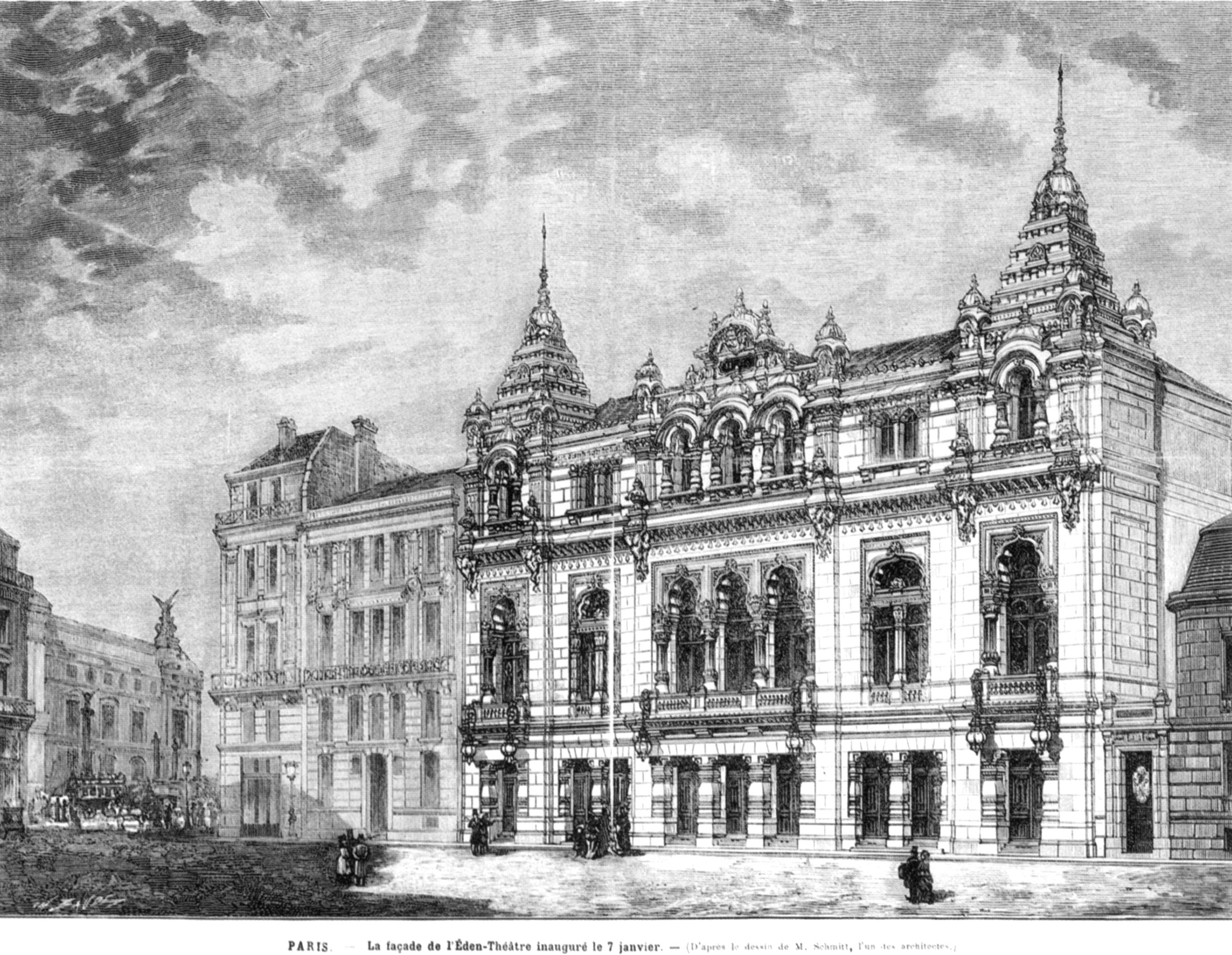
- Entrance facade of the Éden-Théâtre (with the west facade of the nearby Palais Garnier in the background on the left)

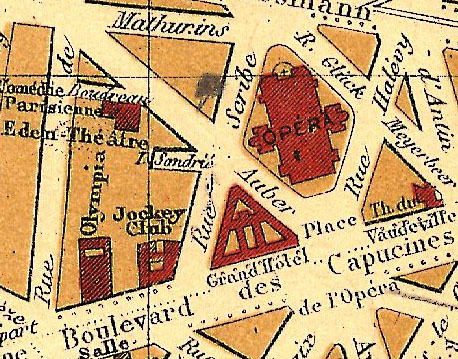
- Detail from an 1893 map of Paris with the Éden-Théâtre on the left and the Opéra (Palais Garnier) on the right
- Address: 7 rue Boudreau, 9th arrondissement Paris
- Coordinates: 48.872153°N 2.329155°E

Construction
- Opened: 7 January 1883
- Demolished: May 1895
- Architects: William Klein; Albert Duclos

The Éden-Théâtre was a large theatre (4,000 seats) in the rue Boudreau, Paris, built at the beginning of the 1880s by the architects William Klein and Albert Duclos (1842–1896) in a style influenced by orientalism. It was demolished in 1895.

== History ==
=== Éden-Théâtre ===
Inspired by Moghol architecture, it was inaugurated on 7 January 1883 with the ballet Excelsior! with music by Romualdo Marenco, and this was followed in subsequent years by other spectacular ballets. The theatre witnessed the single performance of the first Paris production of Wagner's Lohengrin, on 3 May 1887 (in French) with Ernest van Dyck and Fidès Devriès, conducted by Charles Lamoureux, which aroused enormous opposition among the Parisian public. This was followed in 1888 by La fille de Madame Angot with Anna Judic and Jeanne Granier and Le petit duc with José Dupuis and Granier. The four-act version of Orphée aux enfers with Christian and Granier, a revival of Excelsior!, and the Paris premiere of Charles Lecocq's Ali-Baba were presented in 1889.

=== Théâtre Lyrique ===
After a ballet and a grand revue, the theatre was renamed Théâtre Lyrique in October 1890, and the first Paris performance of Samson et Dalila with Talazac and Bloch and La jolie fille de Perth with Émile Engel and Cécile Mézeray were presented, but the theatre closed before the end of the year due to lack of funds.

=== Grand Théâtre ===
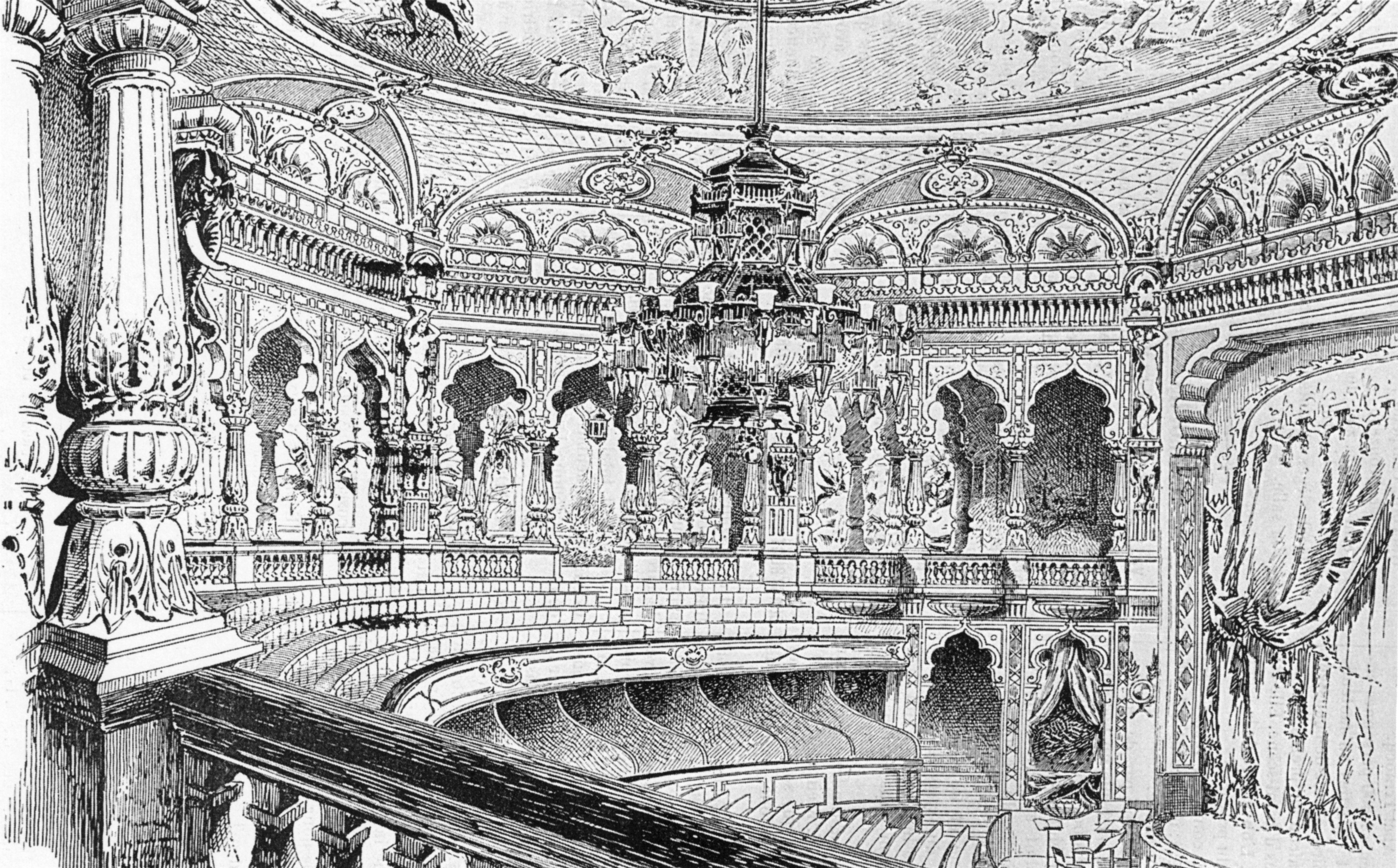
View of the auditorium

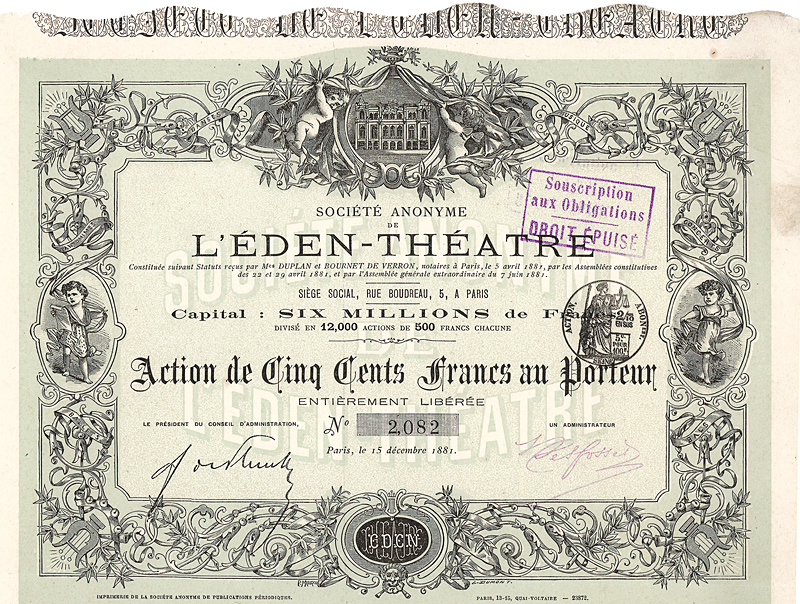
Share certificate of S.A. de l'Eden-Theatre from the 15. December 1881

On 12 November 1892 the theatre became the Grand Théâtre, opening with Daudet's play Sapho (with incidental music by Mendelssohn, Delibes and Massenet), followed by a production of Le Malade imaginaire with Charpentier's music arranged by Saint-Saëns. The year 1893 saw a production of L'Arlésienne (music director Gabriel Marie), Pêcheur d'Islande by Loti with Guitry and music by Ropartz, and in November that year the Société des Grand Concerts of Colonne gave Marie-Magdeleine (with Gabrielle Krauss) and La damnation de Faust (with Engel).

=== Comédie-Parisienne ===
In 1893 a foyer of the Grand Théâtre was converted into a much smaller theatre called the Comédie-Parisienne (later renamed Théâtre de l'Athénée). The colossal theatre suffered continual financial difficulties, closed in 1894, and was demolished in May 1895.

== Sources ==
- Fauquet, Joël-Marie, editor (2001). Dictionnaire de la musique en France au XIX^{e} siècle. Paris: Fayard. ISBN 9782213593166.
- Langham-Smith, Richard (1992). "Paris: 1870–1902" in Sadie 1992, vol. 3, p. 873–879.
- Noel, Édouard; Stoullig, Edmond (1875–1918). Les Annales du Théâtre et de la Musique (41 volumes). Paris. View at HathiTrust.
- Sadie, Stanley, editor (1992). The New Grove Dictionary of Opera (4 volumes). London: Macmillan. ISBN 978-1-56159-228-9.
- Tydeman, William; Price, Steven (1991). Wilde: Salome Cambridge: Cambridge University Press. ISBN 978-0-521-56545-5.
- Wild, Nicole (2003) "Éden-Théâtre" in Fauquet 2003, p. 422.
