= Émile Armand Gibon =

French general

Émile Armand Gibon (1813–1870) (Commander of the Légion d'Honneur) was a French General born in Quimper (Département du Finistère, Brittany, France) on 15 September 1813. He served in Algeria, Crimea and France from 1836 to 1870.

== Military career ==
Emile Armand Gibon started his military career as a simple soldier at the 41st Line Infantry Regiment of Brest (Brittany) under the command of his own father who was commanding the very same regiment. After climbing through the ranks, he became an officer on April 25, 1836. He served in Algeria at the Tirailleur Battalion of Oran. Because of his courage in action, he was admitted to the Légion d'Honneur on August 12, 1845, and promoted Commander on May 29, 1849. He then served in Crimea and took part at the Battle of Alma on September 20, 1854. Battalion Commander on February 9, 1855, in front of Sebastopol he received a citation order to the Armée d'Orient and got awarded the rank of Officer of the Légion d'Honneur and Commander of the same Order on April 17, 1866. On 18 June 1859 he was promoted to the rank of lieutenant colonel at the 70th Infantry Regiment. He was then Nicknamed "The Intrepid" by the Chief of Staff as recalled Léon Guérin in his book "Histoire de la Derniere Guerre de Russie" (History of the Last Russian War).

General Mac Mahon (Later Président of the French Républic 1873–1879) transferred him personally to the First Grenadier Regiment of the Imperial Guard, the elite regiment of the French Army.

Colonel at the 25th Infantry Regiment on March 14, 1863, he fought during the 1870 War at Rezonville, St Privat, Servigny, Woippy and Landonchamps where he served under General Julius Richardson de Marguenat. After the death of the later, he was promoted to the rank of Brigadier General.

On 7 October 1870 at the Battle of Bellevue, he charged in front of the 25th and 26th Regiments and was gravely wounded in battle.

Gibon was highly appreciated and trusted by his superiors, officers and soldiers for his bravery in action, competency in military tactics and very warm relationships with his men of all nationalities. He died from his wounds on October 19, 1870, and was buried at the Woippy cemetery.

== Family ==
Emile Armand was from a family with long tradition of military officers. Son of a French Colonel Jean Gibon (1775–1842) (Commander of the Légion d’Honneur, Knight of the Empire and Commanding officer at the 37th and 41st Light Infantry Regiment) and Théodore Eléonore de Pestel. On January 7, 1861 at the age of 47, Gibon married in Paris 7, a young 19-year-old English woman from Lancaster County named Hélene Ord. She gave him 3 children:

1. Louis Charles Emile Gibon-Guilhem (1862–1945). French Brigadier General. His son François Gibon-Guilhem will later become Chief of Staff of the North African-based French Air Force and in turn will become father of Charles Albert (1944)
2. Marie Marceline Gibon (1866–1938) who married Auguste Napoléon Emmanuel Lucien Colonna de Giovellina (1852–1939) on 11 January 1888.
3. Laure Helen Marguerite Gibon (1869–1957) who married Charles Louis Lacretelle (1859–1915), the nephew of Gibon's long-time friend General Charles Nicolas Lacretelle on 26 January 1891. From this marriage was born in Angers (Beaucouzé) Valérie Marie Lacretelle (1891–1982) who later married Arthur Gaillard de St-Germain in 1919 giving birth to their son Olivier in October 1921. From his first marriage with Monique Lorand, the Count Olivier Gaillard de Saint Germain (French Diplomat) had two children, Régine-Anne (1950) and Geoffroy Gaillard de Saint Germain born in Rabat (1957) and later 1 daughter Hélen from his second marriage with Daniele Doucet.

The Gibon's branch of the general has since changed its name to Gibon-Guilhem and is still well represented in France. The general's latest descendant carrying his name was born in 2011.

Gibon died on 19 October 1870.
