= Daudet =

Daudet (English: /doʊˈdeɪ/, French: [dodɛ]) is a given name and surname. Notable people with the name include:

== People with the surname ==
- Alphonse Daudet (1840–1897), French novelist
- Célimène Daudet (born 1977), French classical pianist
- Ernest Daudet (1837–1921), French journalist, novelist and historian
- François Daudet (born 1965), French classical pianist
- Joris Daudet (born 1991), French cyclist
- Julia Daudet (1844–1940), French writer, poet and journalist
- Léon Daudet (1867–1942), French journalist, writer, an active Orléanist, and a member of the Académie Goncourt (son of Alphonse Daudet)
- Lucien Daudet (1878–1946), French novelist, painter, and friend of Marcel Proust (son of Alphonse Daudet)

== People with the given name ==
- Daudet N'Dongala (born 1944), French footballer

== See also ==
- Prix Jean Ferré, a French literary prize formerly known as the Daudet Prize
