= Las Aventuras de Jack =

- Directed by: Carlos F. Borcosque
- Written by: Carlos F. Borcosque; Alphonse Daudet (novel)
- Produced by: Carlos F. Borcosque
- Cinematography: José María Beltrán; Américo Hoss
- Edited by: José Cañizares
- Music by: Alejandro Gutiérrez del Barrio
- Release date: 1949
- Running time: 97 minute
- Country: Argentina
- Language: Spanish

Las Aventuras de Jack is a 1949 Argentine film of the classical era of Argentine cinema, directed and written by Carlos F. Borcosque based on the novel Jack by Alphonse Daudet. The music was composed by Alejandro Gutiérrez del Barrio. Set in the 19th century, its protagonist is a young man, son of a frivolous countess, who faces the rigors of a tragic life.

== Cast ==
- Juan Carlos Barbieri
- Guillermo Battaglia
- Alberto Bello
- Homero Cárpena
- Eva Caselli
- Manolo Díaz
- Francisco Pablo Donadio
- César Fiaschi
- Nedda Francy
- Antonia Herrero
