= Jack (Daudet novel) =

1876 novel by Alphonse Daudet

- Author: Alphonse Daudet
- Translator: Mary Neal Sherwood
- Language: French
- Publication date: 1876
- Publication place: France
- English publication date: 1877
- Pages: 762

Jack (French: Jack : mœurs contemporaines, lit. 'Jack: Contemporary Manners') is a novel by the French writer Alphonse Daudet, published by Édouard Dentu in two volumes in 1876. It was published in English translation by Mary Neal Sherwood in 1877.

It is about the Frenchman Jack, who is followed through his youth with a single mother and unknown father, as a literary student under a poor professor who starts an abusive relationship with Jack's mother, as an ironworker, as a stoker on a trans-Atlantic steamship, and as a medical student in Paris, as he struggles with family, love and friendship. Charles Dudley Warner wrote that the novel is characterised by "a passionate sympathy".

It is not to be confused with My Brother Jack: Or the Story of What-D'Ye-Call'em, which is an 1877 English translation of Daudet's book Le Petit Chose.

Jack was adapted into the 1913 French film Jack, the 1925 French film Jack, the 1949 Argentine film Las Aventuras de Jack and the 1975 French 13-part television series Jack.

== See also ==
- Illegitimacy in fiction
