= Jack (1925 film) =

1925 film

- Directed by: Robert Saidreau
- Based on: Jack by Alphonse Daudet
- Produced by: Robert Saidreau
- Starring: Jean Yonnel; André Dubosc; Thérèse Kolb
- Cinematography: Georges Asselin
- Release date: 3 October 1925
- Running time: 80 minutes
- Country: France
- Languages: Silent; French intertitles

Jack is a 1925 French silent drama film directed by Robert Saidreau and starring Jean Yonnel, André Dubosc and Thérèse Kolb. It is based on the 1876 novel of the same title by Alphonse Daudet.

== Cast ==
- Jean Yonnel as Le poète d'Argenteuil
- Yanne Exiane as Ida de Bargency
- Madeleine Carlier as Clarisse Le Roudic
- André Dubosc as Docteur Rivals
- Max de Rieux as Jack
- Thérèse Kolb as La mère Archaimbaud
- Jean Forest as Jack, enfant
- Olga Noël as Zénaïde
- Jacques Berthier as Le Roudic
- Roger Tréville as Le Nantais
- Thomy Bourdelle as Le fiancé de Zénaïde
- Alexiane as La fille du docteur Rivals
- Octave Berthier as Le Roudic

== Bibliography ==
- Berthomé, Jean-Pierre & Naizet, Gaël. Bretagne et cinéma: cent ans de création cinématographique en Bretagne. Cinémathèque de Bretagne, 1995.
- Goble, Alan. The Complete Index to Literary Sources in Film. Walter de Gruyter, 1999.
