= Marbod of Rennes =

11th-century bishop of Rennes

Marbod, Marbode or Marbodus of Rennes (c. 1035 – 11 September 1123) was archdeacon and schoolmaster at Angers, France, then Bishop of Rennes in Brittany. He was a respected poet, hagiographer, and hymnologist.

== Biography ==
Marbod was born near Angers in Anjou, France, presumably in the mid-1030s. He received at least part of his early education at Angers under archdeacon and schoolmaster Rainaldus (d. c. 1076), who may have been trained by Fulbert of Chartres. He was a well-known and highly praised scholar in Angers. Marbod had three known named relatives: a brother named Hugo, who was a canon of Saint-Maurice of Angers, a mother most likely named Hildeburgis, and a nephew named Herveus.

Two of Marbod's family members were in the entourage of Count Fulk le Réchin of Anjou. The power of the episcopate in Northern France during the twelfth century was immense. The position came with land, economic, political, and spiritual power which had been continued on from the time of Carolingian kings. For noblemen, having a bishop on one's side could lend to having a lot of pull in politics. Count Fulk negotiated Marbod's position as bishop because he was acquainted with Marbod's family and therefore someone who he could influence the power of with more ease. Marbod was a canon in the cathedral chapter of Saint-Maurice of Angers as early as c. 1068. In about 1076 he became the cardinal archdeacon of Angers as well as the master of its cathedral school. He was consecrated in his mid-60s as bishop of Rennes by Pope Urban II (1088–1099) during the Council of Tours (16–23 March 1096) while he was touring France to promote his crusade. Marbod succeeded Silvester of La Guerche (1076–93) as bishop. Although Pope Urban II was a reforming pope in the tradition of Pope Gregory VII (1073–1085) (see Gregorian Reform), it is likely that Marbod's selection as bishop had a significant political component. Pope Urban II's goals were to promote his crusade and have the church gain more freedom and separation, and therefore power, from the secular world. Bishop Marbod attempted to implement reform principles in his diocese of Rennes, working to regain episcopal possessions that had been alienated by his predecessor-bishops, and helping transfer churches held by laymen to ecclesiastical hands. With these actions, he aided in the continuation of Gregorian Reform through aiding the acquisition of land for the church. He was critical of the more extreme practices of Robert of Arbrissel and other such itinerant preachers wandering northwestern France at the time, but his letters indicate that he was tolerant of and even favorable towards their religious ideals.

At the age of about eighty-eight he resigned his diocese and withdrew to the Benedictine monastery of St. Aubin at Angers where he died.

== Writings ==
Marbod was renowned for his Latin writing during his lifetime. Sigebert of Gembloux, writing c. 1110–1125, praised Marbod's clever verse style. He composed works in verse and prose on both sacred and secular subjects: saints' lives, examples of rhetorical figures (De ornamentis verborum), a work of Christian advice (Liber decem capitulorum) hymns, lyric poetry on many subjects, and at least six prose letters.

His style of poetry was part of a group of poets that were from French Cathedral Schools. Their poetry was marked by its revival of the classical style, writing in Latin and specific verse. He commonly wrote in Leonine hexameter. A poem written this way would consist of six metrical feet per line. This style of verse was popular in the Middle Ages and was distinguishable from verse in antiquity by its use of rhyme within the feet of the poem. Marbod's subject matter was diverse, dealing with both secular and religious topics. He wrote mainly didactic poetry; poetry that gave instruction or lessons to its readers.

The most popular of Marbod's works was the Liber de lapidibus, a verse lapidary or compendium of mythological gem-lore; by the fourteenth century it had been translated into French, Provençal, Italian, Irish, and Danish, and it was the first of Marbod's works to be printed.

The first collection of Marbod's works was published at Rennes in 1524 (In collectione prima operum Marbodi). Today the most widely accessible edition of Marbod's collected works is that in Migne's Patrologiae cursus completus Series Latina, vol. 171, edited by Jean-Jacques Bourassé (Paris, 1854); this was based on the edition of Antoine Beaugendre, Venerabilis Hildeberti primo Cenomannensis Accesserunt Marbodi Redonensis (Paris, 1708). Both contain numerous errors and omissions and should be used with caution. Modern editions of Marbod's works include Antonella Degl’Innocenti, ed. Marbodo di Rennes: Vita beati Roberti (Florence, 1995), Maria Esthera Herrera, ed., Marbodo de Rennes Lapidario (Liber lapidum) (Paris, 2005), and Marc Wolterbeek, ed. and trans., Marbod of Rennes, The Complete Poems (Turnhout, 2026).

Marbod produced lyric poetry on a wide variety of subjects, including frankly erotic love lyrics concerning male and female love interests. Many of his shorter poems circulated primarily in florilegia, collections assembled for the use of students. The most radical of Marbod's poems, while printed in the earliest collections, were omitted by Beaugendre and Bourassé; they were reprinted by Walther Bulst in "Liebesbriefgedichte Marbods," in Liber floridus: Mittellateinische Studien Paul Lehmann, zum 65 Geburtstaag am 13. Juli 1949, ed. Bernhard Bischoff and Suso Brechter (St. Ottilien, 1950), p. 287–301, and Lateinisches Mittelalter: Gesammelte Beitraege (Heidelberg, 1984), 182–196.

=== Sexuality ===
Marbod's sexuality and attitudes towards same-sex sexual relations has been the subject of much scholarly debate. For one, Marbod writes in the first person and in amorous and erotic terms about male and female lovers and love interests alike; in "Argument Against the Love of Venus”, Marbod writes of a "distinguished boy whose beauty is my fire". He thus rejects the love of Venus, that is, the love of a young woman who desires him, but acknowledges that her charms may have persuaded him in the past. Furthermore, while several of Marbod's poems speak openly of homosexual desire ("To His Absent Lover", "The Unyielding Youth"), others adopt a polemical tone, rejecting both homo- and heterosexual relationships but singling out same-sex sexual relations as especially sinful (An Argument Against Copulation Between People of Only One Sex). Some scholars have sought to explain this apparently contradictory stance by situating it within a literary milieu that favored the imitation of classical models, by comparing Marbod's work to other works commonly grouped within the tradition of courtly love (in which chaste love is a salient, if complex, feature), by suggesting that Marbod's position on same-sex sexual relations may have changed over the course of his life, or by downplaying the sincerity of his more polemical works.

It is evident in other French didactic writing, such as that from Robert de Blois, that sexuality was largely complex. Writers argued against sexualizing a person while simultaneously describing them in an erotic manner. His friendships with Baudry of Bourgeuil, his junior, and Hildebart of Lavardin suggest this as well. Marbod dedicated much of his later works to Hildebart. All three of the men authored some poems about homosexual desire. These poems reflected other communities of poets in Europe. Jewish communities in Spain similarly wrote about pederasty and the beauty and allure of young men. The similarities in these communities of men writing about homosexuality implies a larger subculture of Medieval literature outside of individual men.

== Translations and adaptations ==
- A French translation of his hymns was edited by Ropartz (Rennes, 1873).
- Marbod's verse life of Saint Thaïs, a fourth-century Egyptian prostitute who finished her life as a recluse, inspired the novel by Anatole France and in turn the opera by Jules Massenet.
- Marbod of Rennes, The Complete Poems, ed. and trans. Marc Wolterbeek (Turnhout, 2026).

== Sources ==
- Herbermann, Charles, ed. (1913). "Marbodius". Catholic Encyclopedia. New York: Robert Appleton Company.
