= Fromont and Risler =

1874 novel by Alphonse Daudet

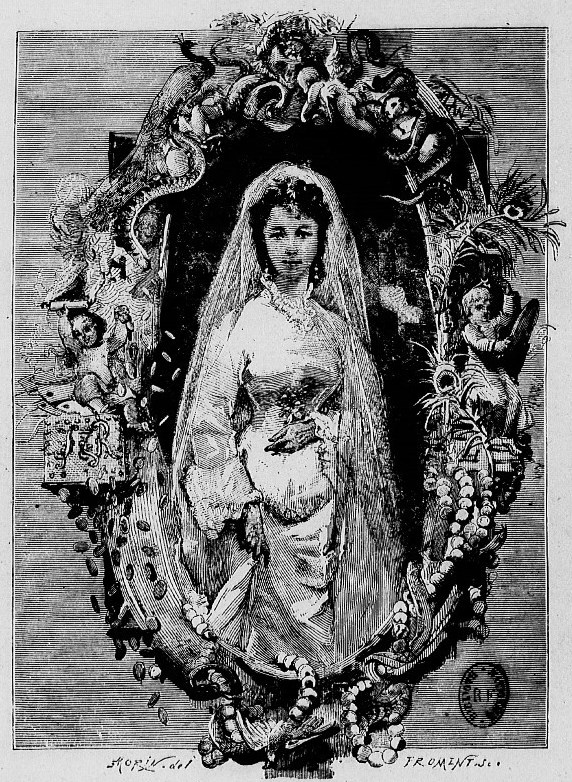
Fromont and Risler

Fromont jeune et Risler aîné (1874; English: Fromont Junior and Risler Senior or Fromont and Risler or Sidonie) is a novel by French author Alphonse Daudet. It is the novel that first made Daudet famous, or as he put it, "the dawn of his popularity."

== History ==
Fromont and Risler is the novel that first made Daudet famous. He had won a creditable literary place for himself before its publication with Letters From My Windmill (1869), but when Fromont and Risler appeared in 1874, he was at once hailed as one of the few really great novelists of his time, one of the few who knew how to deal adequately with the mysteries, the complexities, and the subtleties of human nature and human passion. The novel was crowned by the French Academy with the Prix de Jouy in 1875, but that was a small part of its success. It was everywhere read and talked of, from the highest to the lowest ranks. Numberless editions of the book were printed — deluxe editions, library editions, and editions so cheap that the gamins of the streets might buy and read; and demands poured in for the privilege of translation rights in other countries.
