= Rezonville-Vionville =

- Commune
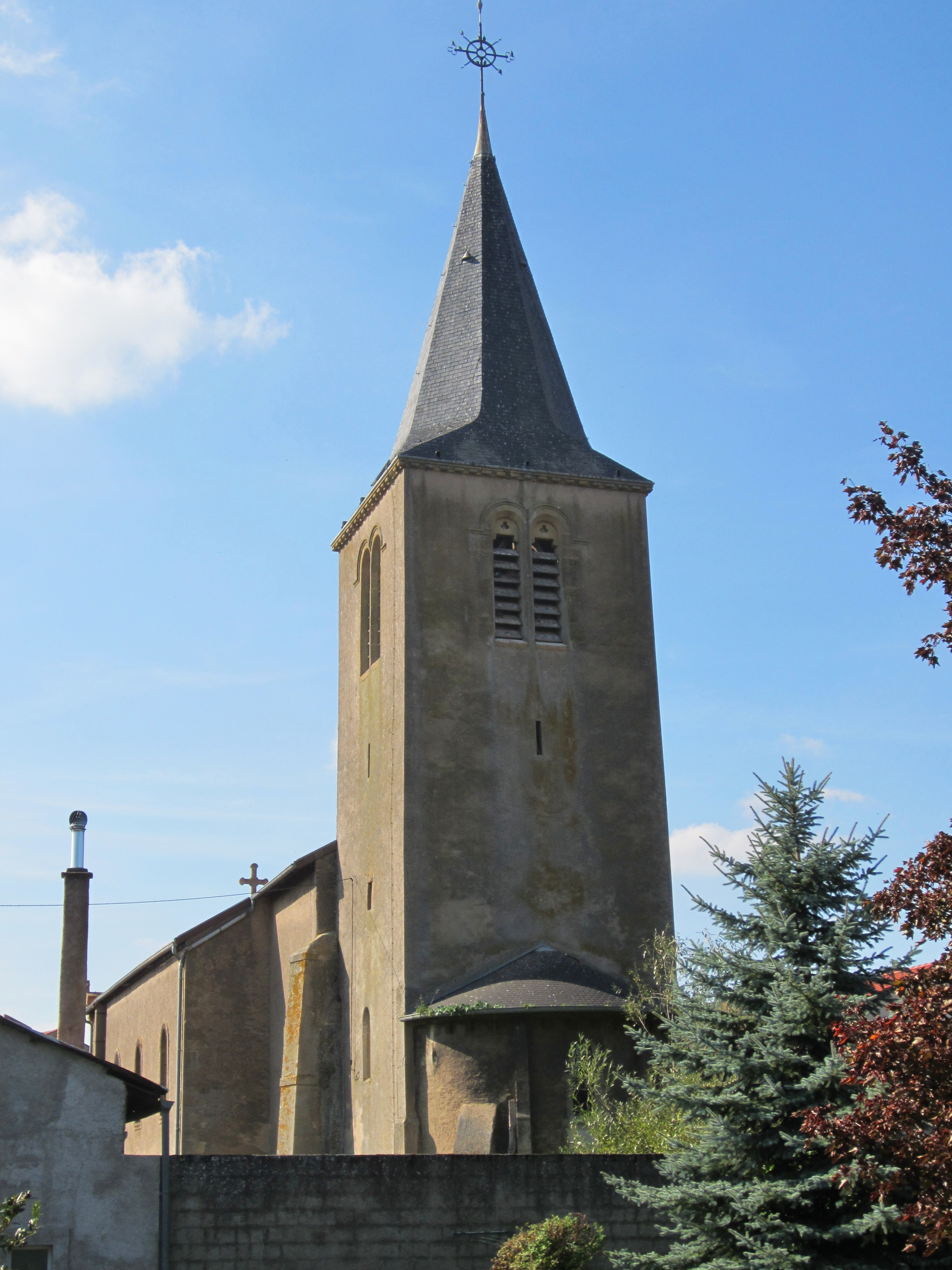
- The church in Rezonville
- Location of Rezonville-Vionville
- Location within France Location within Grand Est
- Coordinates: 49°05′54″N 5°59′28″E
- Country: France
- Region: Grand Est
- Department: Moselle
- Arrondissement: Metz
- Canton: Les Coteaux de Moselle
- Intercommunality: Mad et Moselle

Government
  - Mayor (2020–2026): Vincent Boniface
- Area^{1}: 23.10 km^{2} (8.92 sq mi)
- Highest elevation: 321 m (1,053 ft)
- Lowest elevation: 230 m (750 ft)
- Population (2023): 517
  - Density: 22.4/km^{2} (58.0/sq mi)
- Time zone: UTC+01:00 (CET)
  - Summer (DST): UTC+02:00 (CEST)
- INSEE/Postal code: 57578 /57130
- ^{1} French Land Register data, which excludes lakes, ponds, glaciers > 1 km^{2} (0.386 sq mi or 247 acres) and river estuaries.

Rezonville-Vionville (French pronunciation: [ʁəzɔ̃vil vjɔ̃vil]) is a commune in the Moselle department in Grand Est in north-eastern France. It was established on 1 January 2019 by merger of the former communes of Rezonville (the seat) and Vionville.

== See also ==
- Communes of the Moselle department
