= Robert Helmont =

French novella

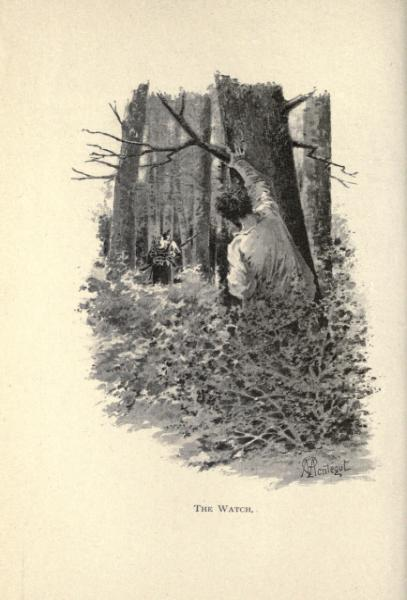
"The Watcher", artwork by Picard and Montégut

Robert Helmont (1874; English: Robert Helmont: Diary of a Recluse, 1870–1871 (1888)) is a novella by French author Alphonse Daudet. It is partly based on Daudet's actual experiences during the Franco-Prussian War of 1870–71, as described in the Preface. The book was originally serialized in 1873 in the weekly illustrated magazine Le Musée Universel and published in book form by E. Dentu in 1874 under the title Robert Helmont: Études et paysages, but received little notice. It was re-published in 1888 with illustrations by "Picard and Montégut". The forest Sénart is the same described in his novel Jack and contains some of the same characters.

Robert Helmont breaks his leg on the day of the start of the war. Unable to flee to Paris ahead of the advancing "Saxons", he decides to hide in an hermitage deep in the Sénart woods. For the next 5 months he has a series of adventures, as told by Daudet in colorful and naturalistic prose. Historically accurate details about costume, architecture, food and mannerisms provide an excellent painting of the time. Hot air balloons, messenger pigeons and late night cut-throat murders lend the novel an air of high adventure, mixed with a love of nature and solitude.
