= Comte de Sanois =

French nobleman and army officer

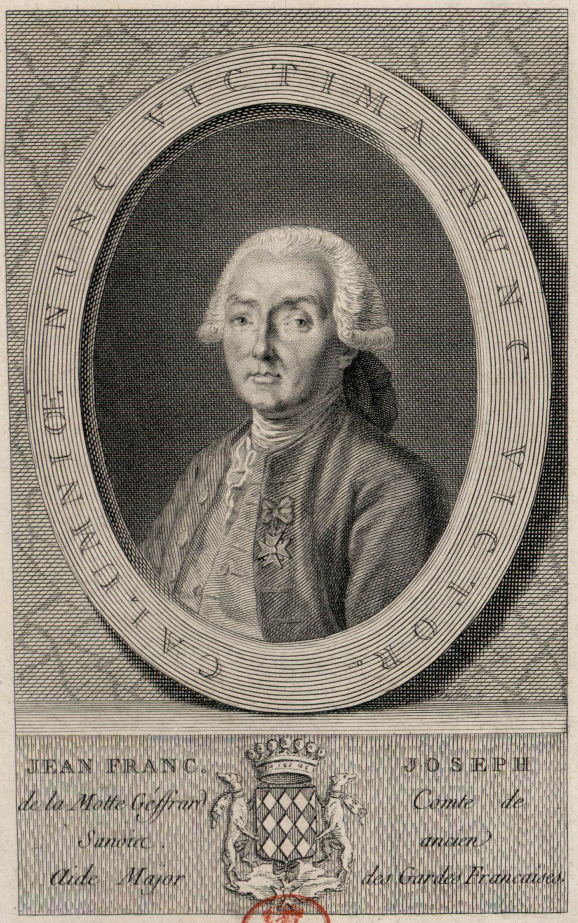
Comte de Sanois (1723–1799)

Jean-François Joseph Geffrard de La Motte, Comte de Sanois (1723–1799), was a French nobleman and army officer. In his later years his wife committed him unjustly to the Asylum of Charenton under a lettre de cachet, an incident which because it illustrated the despotic and arbitrary nature of the legal system of the ancien régime became a cause célèbre known as the Affaire Sanois on the eve of the Revolution, in the course of which the count also became increasingly well known for his many political pamphlets.

== Biography ==
The Comte de Sanois was born in 1723 near Vitré in Brittany into an old aristocratic family, whose properties included the fief of Sanois in Annet-sur-Marne, and Pantin. In 1745, he joined the prestigious regiment of the Gardes Françaises and shortly afterwards was present at the Battle of Fontenoy. Soon after his marriage in 1761, he left military service and withdrew to his estates. His wife, however, the only daughter of a rich counsellor of the Parlement of Paris, was not happy at the prospect of a quiet country life. Despite some legacies which made the couple relatively wealthy, they nevertheless fell into debt, which caused many domestic disputes and eventually a public drama.

In 1785, in despair at his financial position and crippled by illness, de Sanois fled to Lausanne. Under the mistaken impression that he had taken with him what remained of their fortune, his wife obtained a lettre de cachet from Lenoir, lieutenant-general of police, under which a police inspector was authorised to follow him and force him to return, whereupon he was imprisoned in the Asylum of Charenton. Ceaselessly protesting his innocence, he was finally released after nine months and immediately began proceedings against his wife to compel her to abandon her request for separation and to clear his good name and reputation.

== The Sanois Affair ==
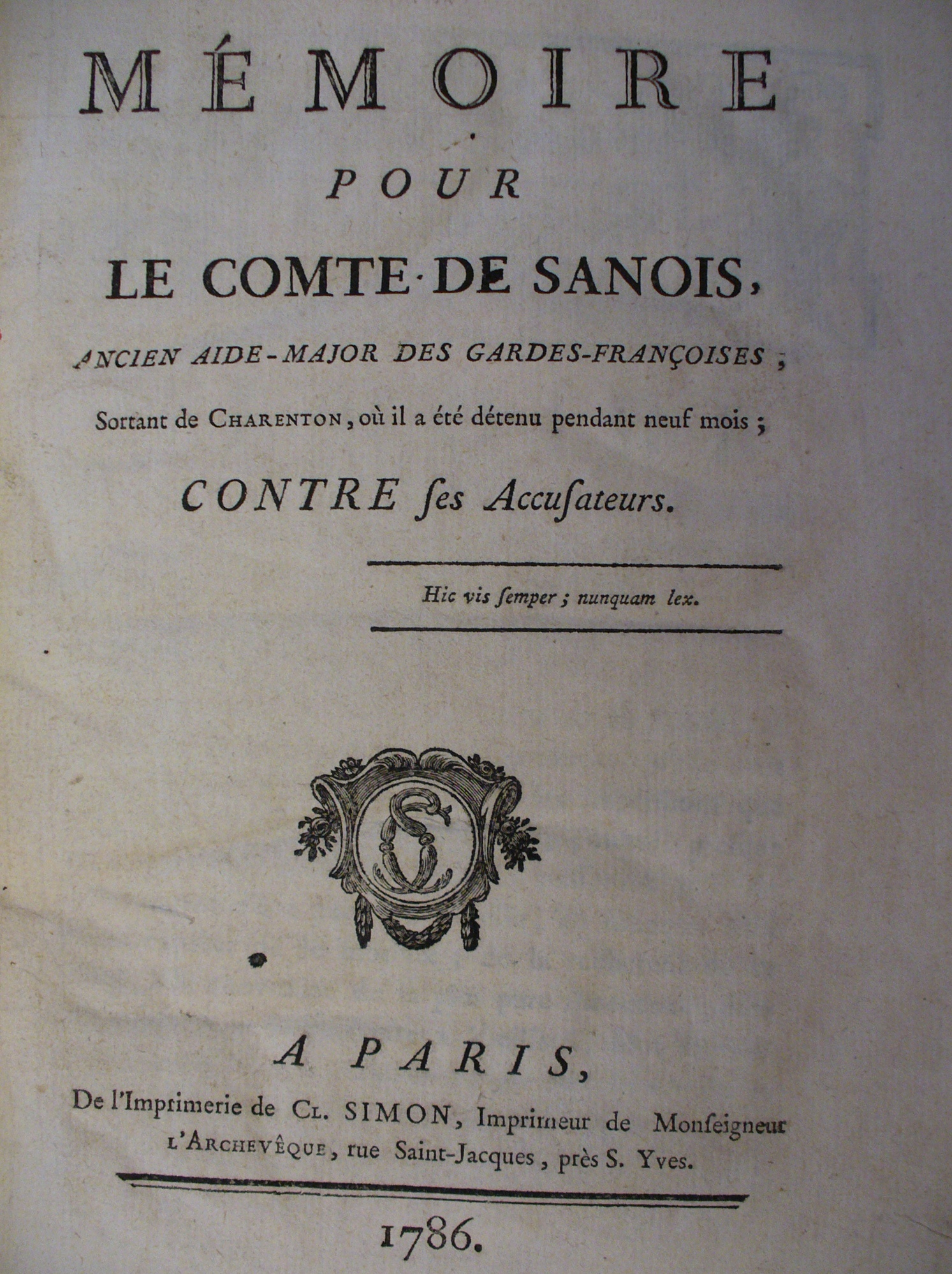
Memoir of Lacretelle

In 1786 the Sanois Affair (Affaire Sanois) erupted into an extremely tense social climate which transformed what would otherwise have been a banal private case into a headline-grabbing lawsuit. There was huge public indignation over the principle of the lettre de cachet, a symbol of despotism, and there was sympathy for the unfortunate old man whom his unnatural wife had had thrown into Charenton. The business thus lent itself to media exploitation by ambitious and talented lawyers like Pierre Louis de Lacretelle, the new champion of individual freedoms.

De Lacretelle dashed off his Memoir for the Comte de Sanois which denounces in passing the abusive use of the lettre de cachet. Exempt from censorship, the legal memoir (mémoire judiciaire or factum) had become a fashionable literary genre. Initially a straightforward working document written by lawyers for the judges, it had now become a means of communication of frightening power which circulated among the salons and the coffee houses. Thanks to this currency of the legal memoir, readers could easily become engaged in famous cases such as the Affair of the Diamond Necklace or the Kornmann case.

The press also played a decisive part in provoking the curiosity of the public. Among the publications which revealed the background and details of topical affairs, one of the most reliable is certainly the "Mémoires secrets", an anonymous serial published over many years Various authors have been credited with contributing to it, among them a certain Mouffle d’Angerville, to whom are attributed no less than thirty-four articles favourable to the Comte de Sanois. In 1788, the count assembled these articles and amplified them with his own comments in a work entitled Mon honneur finalement justifié ("My honour finally justified"). Although he rectifies some errors, generally his tone is highly enthusiastic before the authenticity of these chronicles:
"Sirs, you have reproduced this scene with such exactitude that there is not a comma to remove here, nor a point to be added there."

The defence of the countess was undertaken by the lawyer Tronson du Coudray. In 1787, the lawsuit concluded in a compromise: Mme de Sanois was to keep the totality of the couple's goods but agreed to pay an income to her husband and acknowledged that her charges against him were unfounded.

De Sanois then went into exile again, this time to the Principality of Neuchâtel, where he hoped to publish the full account of his misfortunes with the Société typographique de Neuchâtel. But apparently he encountered some difficulties. It was with joy that he learnt the news of the convocation of the Estates-General in 1789 and returned to Paris to make his voice heard against the lettres de cachets and ministerial despotism.

He was initially closely aligned to the patriots who were demanding reforms, and full of enthusiasm published booklet after booklet in support of the Revolution. Although he was the feudal lord of Pantin (near Paris), he even had printed the cahiers de doléances ("lists of grievances") of his own parish, accompanied by his own annotations.

As Lacretelle observed, "He initially turned to the ideas of freedom: but soon, the abuses that were made of it turned him against them".

Faithful to the king and religion, he was then imprisoned as a counter-revolutionary. Although arrested twice, he escaped the guillotine and died in Paris on the 24 pluviôse in year VII, or 12 February 1799.

== Works ==
The Comte de Sanois was an original personality, unrepentant, as a litigant confident of his own right and good faith, but became inebriated by the notoriety he acquired in 1786. He took advantage of the contemporary wind of reform to present his ideas and by the time of his death had produced about fifty political booklets strewn with many autobiographical testimonies.

== Literary references ==
- Lacretelle, P.L. de, nd: Œuvres, vol. 1, pp. viij and xij; vol. 2, pp. 99ff., pp. 218ff., pp. 276ff., pp. 446ff.; vol. 3, ppp. 77ff., p. 399ff.
- Maza, Sarah: "Domestic Melodrama as Political Ideology, The Case of the Comte de Sanois" in The American Historical Review, vol. 94, 1989
- Maza, Sarah, 1993: Private Lives and Public Affairs : the Causes Celebres of Pre-Revolutionary France
- Richard, Hélène-Claire, Caroff, André, 2006: Le comte de Sanois, Paris, Ed. Paradigme
