= Julius Richardson de Marguenat =

Julius (also known as Julien) Richardson de Marguenat (1812–1870) was a French Army Brigadier General born in Morton, Gloucestershire on 21 August 1812.

In 1830, Julius Richardson joined the 13th Promotion (Firmament Promotion 1830-1832) of the famous French Military Academy École spéciale militaire de Saint-Cyr.

On 3 September 1850 Marguenat was promoted Colonel at the 1st Light Infantry Regiment and was awarded the rank of Knight of the Légion d’Honneur the same day. He became General on 3 October 1854. He also was awarded the title of Commander of the Légion d’Honneur on 14 May 1860.

During his military career, Marguenat received 6 citations and was wounded in battle. At the beginning of the Franco-Prussian War (1870–71), he commanded the 1st Brigade (Fourth Infantry Division) at the 6th Army Corps of the Rhine Army. He fought at the battle of Rezonville and was killed in action on 16 August 1870.

Following his death, Marguenat was immediately replaced by Colonel Émile Armand Gibon (then promoted Brigadier General).
