= Vionville =

Commune in Moselle, France

- Part of Rezonville-Vionville
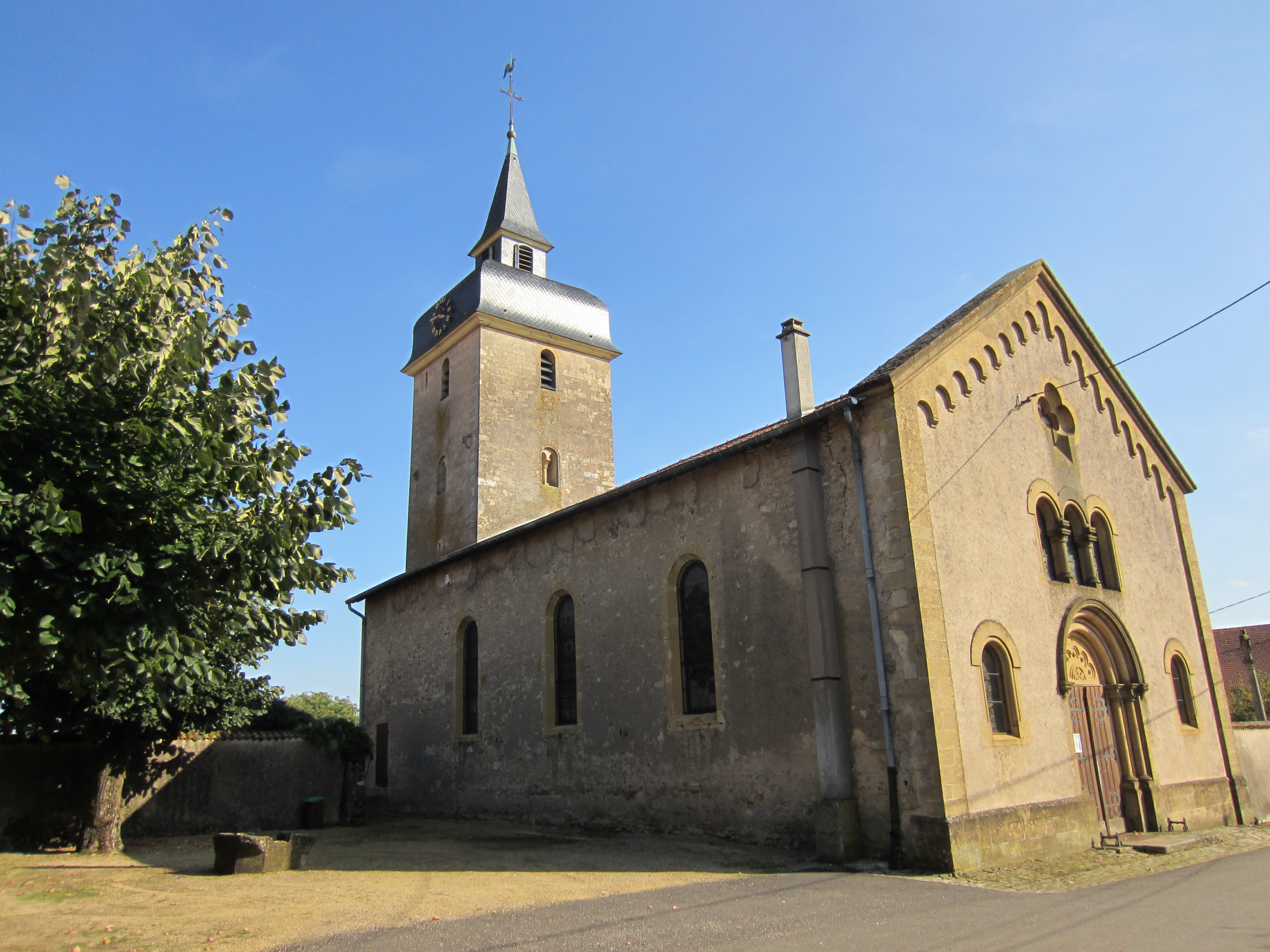
- The church in Vionville

- Coat of arms
- Location of Vionville
- Location within France Location within Grand Est
- Coordinates: 49°05′34″N 5°56′55″E
- Country: France
- Region: Grand Est
- Department: Moselle
- Arrondissement: Metz
- Canton: Les Coteaux de Moselle
- Commune: Rezonville-Vionville
- Area^{1}: 9.65 km^{2} (3.73 sq mi)
- Elevation: 291 m (955 ft)
- Highest elevation: 307 m (1,007 ft)
- Lowest elevation: 240 m (790 ft)
- Population (2022): 195
  - Density: 20.2/km^{2} (52.3/sq mi)
- Time zone: UTC+01:00 (CET)
  - Summer (DST): UTC+02:00 (CEST)
- Postal code: 57130
- ^{1} French Land Register data, which excludes lakes, ponds, glaciers > 1 km^{2} (0.386 sq mi or 247 acres) and river estuaries.

Vionville (French pronunciation: [vjɔ̃vil]) is a former commune in the Moselle department in Grand Est in north-eastern France. On 1 January 2019, it was merged into the new commune Rezonville-Vionville.

The battle of Vionville (Rezonville or Mars-la-Tour) was fought here on 16 of August 1870 between the French and the Germans during the Franco-Prussian War.

== See also ==
- Communes of the Moselle department
- Parc naturel régional de Lorraine
