= Louis Charles Émile Gibon-Guilhem =

French infantry brigadier general (1862–1945)

- Born: Louis Charles Gibon; 23 January 1862
- Died: 10 June 1945 (aged 83); Paris, France
- Relatives: Émile Armand Gibon
- Military career
- Allegiance: France
- Branch: Army
- Service years: 1882–1922
- Rank: Brigadier General
- Awards: Croix de Guerre

Louis Charles Émile Gibon-Guilhem (1862–1945) was a French Infantry Brigadier General born in Rueil-Malmaison (Hauts-de Seine), France. Serving on the German front during World War I, he was instrumental in the victory of allied forces in 1918.

== Private life ==
Louis Charles Gibon was born on 23 January 1862 in a French family with long military tradition who took its origin in Brittany, France. He was the son of Brigadier General Émile Armand Gibon (1813–1870), who died when Louis Charles was 8 years old. His grand father Jean Gibon (1775–1842) was a highly decorated Colonel, Commander of the Legion of Honour and Knight of the Empire. After Louis' father's death, his Scottish mother, Elen Ord, returned to her homeland, Great Britain. Her children never saw her again. Louis Charles was left with his siblings under the care of General Charles Nicolas Lacretelle (a friend of his father) and his wife Valérie Marie Guilhem. Later, at the age of 46, and by judgment dated 12 November 1908 of the Civil Court of Angers, he was officially adopted by the recently widowed Valérie Marie. As recorded on his birth certificate, his name was then changed to Louis Charles Emile Gibon-Guilhem.

Louis Charles Emile had a son François Gibon Guilhem born on 31 January 1898, who joined the Army and later became an aviator. François became Chief of Staff of the North African-based French Air Force in 1942. From his marriage, François had a son Charles Albert born in Algers in 1944. General Gibon-Guilhem died in Paris on 10 June 1945.

== Campaigns and military positions ==
Louis Charles joined the army on 25 October 1882 and entered the famous Ecole Spéciale Militaire de Saint-Cyr ("Pavillons Noirs" Promotion) as a Cadet, from which he graduated in 1884 (with the rank 97 out of 406).

- 1885 – On 12 February Lieutenant Gibon joined the 1st Zouave Regiment in Salon and was sent to Algeria 2 days later.
- 1888 – On 29 February he joined the 4th Tirailleur Algérien Regiment in Sousse. On 11 September, Gibon is sent the 3rd Tirailleur Algérien based in Tunisia.

After 9 years in North Africa Gibon returned to metropolitan France on 31 Mai 1894.

- 1894–1896 Gibon joined the 65th Infantry Regiment
- 1896–1897 On 9 December, Gibon became the Attaché of General Lannes commanding the 21st Infantry Division (France) of the 11th Army Corps
- 1898–1900 Instructor at the Ecole Spéciale Militaire de Saint-Cyr he will later be evicted from the academy for insubordination before joining the 62nd I.R.
- 1901–1902 Gibon trains at the 28th Artillery Regiment learning artillery tactics.
- 1907 – On 24 December Gibon became Bataillon Commander at the 115th Infantry Regiment in Mamers.
- 1911 – On 26 October Bataillon Commander Gibon-Guilhem takes command of the prestigious 8th "Chasseur-à-Pied" Bataillon in Amiens.
- 1913 Lieutenant Colonel Gibon-Guilhem is sent to the 39th Infantry Regiment in Rouen
- 1914–1918 On 3 August 1914 War is declared between France and Germany. Colonel Gibon-Guilhem takes command of the 39th Infantry Regiment. This will be is longest command until the end of the War.
- 1916–1917 Colonel Gibon-Guilhem commands the 39th I.R. in Verdun and is gazed during combat.
- 1918 Colonel Gibon-Guilhem takes the 39 IR to the Battle of the Somme.

Despite several citations, awards, medals and recommendations, Gibon-Guilhem was not promoted to General before the end of the conflict.

- 1918–1919 Commander of the Infantry of the 21st Division
- 1919–1920 General Gibon-Guilhem takes command of the 42nd Infantry Brigade
- 1920 Commander of the Fontenay-le-Comte and La Roche-sur-Yon Regions subdivisions
- 1920–1921 Commander of 1st Subdivision Group of the 11th Army Corps.
- 1921–1922 Reserve

On 23 January 1922, General Gibon-Guilhem retired from military duties and lived in Paris until his death in 1945.

== Promotions and decorations ==
- 29 February 1888 Promoted to the rank of Lieutenant
- 9 July 1889 Officer of the Nichan Iftikhar Tunisian Order
- 4 May 1894 Promoted to the rank of Captain
- 12 July 1897 Knighthood of the Légion d'Honneur
- 21 October 1904 Promoted to the rank of major
- 23 July 1913 Promoted to the rank of lieutenant colonel
- 27 October 1914 Promoted to the rank of colonel
- 13 July 1915 Officer of the Légion d'Honneur
- 14 September 1916 St-Anne Russian Order medal
- 27 September 1917 Commander of Order of the Crown (Italy)
- 23 December 1918 Promoted to the rank of Brigadier General
- 16 June 1920 Commander of the Légion d'Honneur
- 1914–1918 Croix de Guerre (War Cross), 5 palms, 2 Silver Stars, 2 Bronze stars
- Médaille Interalliée 1914–1918 de la Victoire

== The 39th Infantry Regiment under Gibon-Guilhem's command ==
"The Regiment endurance was established in Verdun from the very beginning of the campaign in August and September 1914, then again in Artois in June, September and October 1915. During June 1916 under the command of Colonel Gibon-Guilhem in front of Verdun and under an extremely violent bombardment followed by gas emissions and despite severe losses, the regiment maintained its position on the Fleury plateau and contained enemy attacks for 3 days without losing a single inch of ground". General Denis Auguste Duchêne

"Elite regiment with superior fighting capacity. Between 5 and 18 August 1918 under the command of the Colonel Gibon-Guilhem and during 6 consecutive attacks (of which 2 were carried out by the entire regiment under the Colonel's command), the 39th has several times shown its fighting and resilient qualities and strongly contributed to the success of the operations. During this period the regiment made an 18 kilometre progression (12 of which through very hard fighting), took several high enemy positions, 3 villages, inflicted very high losses to the enemy, took over 350 PoW and captured a very significant amount of materials (of which 94 machine guns, 5 canons (one 210) and several minenwerfer". General Debeney

== Memoirs ==
On 1 August 1921, Louis Charles Gibon-Guilhem was sent to the Army Reserve. From that time he started to write the History of the 39th Infantry Regiment (Historique du 39e Régiment d'Infanterie) which has just recently been published based on his memoirs.
