= Julia Daudet =

French writer, poet and journalist (1844–1940)

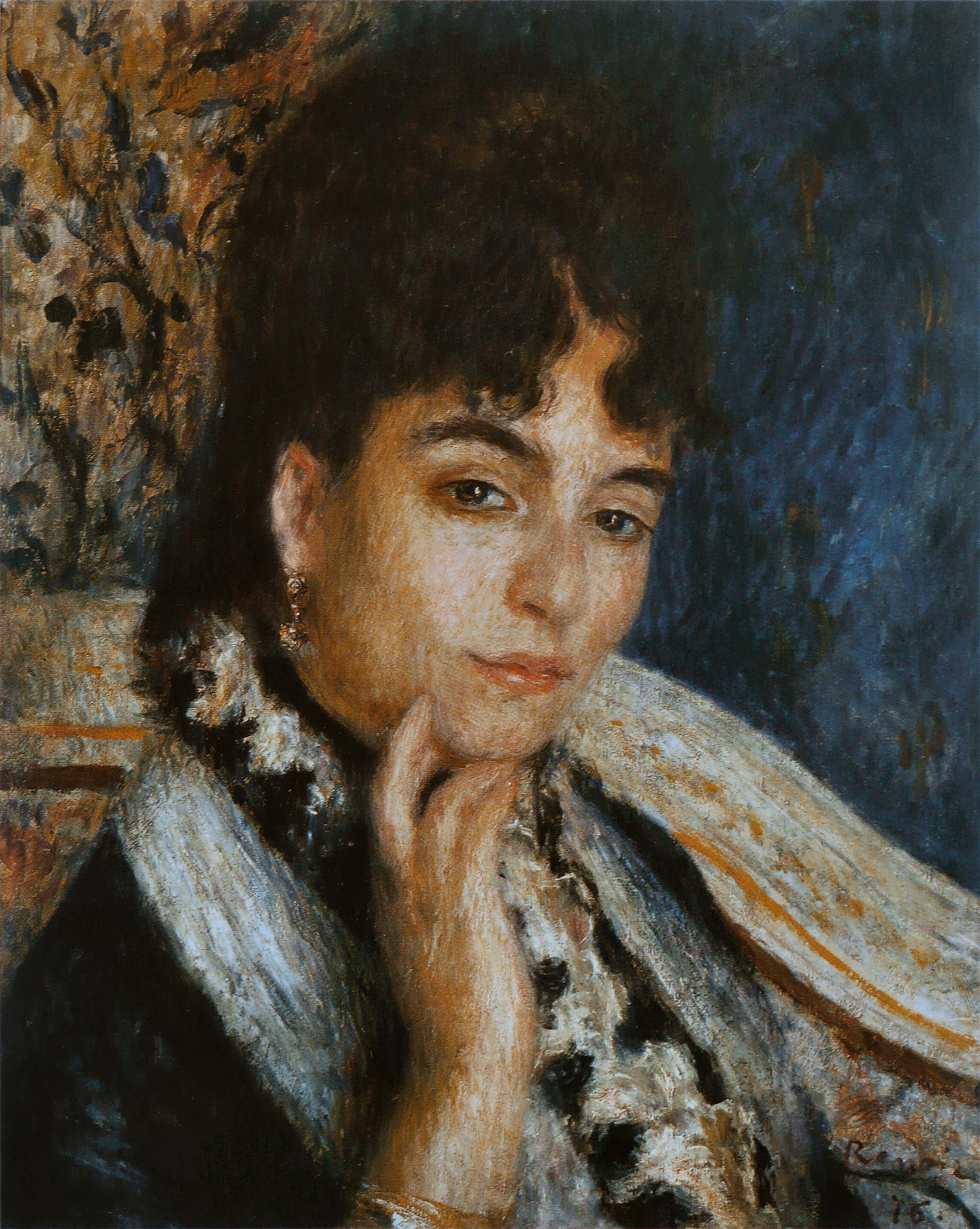
- 1875 portrait of Daudet by Renoir
- Born: Julia Allard; 13 July 1844; Paris, France
- Died: 23 April 1940 (aged 95); Paris, France
- Occupations: Writer; poet; journalist; literary critic
- Spouse: Alphonse Daudet (m. 1867; died 1897)
- Children: Edmée Daudet; Léon Daudet; Lucien Daudet
- Writing career
- Pen name: Marguerite Tournay; Karl Steen

Julia Daudet (French: [ʒylja dodɛ]; born Allard; 13 July 1844 – 23 April 1940) was a French writer, poet and journalist who wrote under the names Marguerite Tournay and Karl Steen. She was the wife and collaborator of Alphonse Daudet, mother of Léon, Lucien and Edmée Daudet.

== Biography ==
Julia Allard grew up in the Marais neighbourhood in Paris, France. Her parents were interested in literature and hosted a salon frequented by Marceline Desbordes-Valmore. Julia published a collection of poetry when she was 17 years old under the name Marguerite Tournay.

On 29 January 1867 she married Alphonse Daudet and became his collaborator. The couple had a summer home in Champrosay that is now a cultural centre. Julia Daudet was also known for her salon in Paris, which was famous for its Thursday receptions, attended by writers and poets such as Edmond de Goncourt, Hélène Vacaresco, Maurice Barrès, Émile Zola, Édouard Drumont, Rosemonde Gérard-Rostand, Guy de Maupassant, Ernest Renan, Arthur Meyer, Léon Gambetta and Rachilde. She published articles in many journals, including the Journal Officiel, as a literary critic under the pseudonym Karl Steen. She was an active member of the jury of the Prix Fémina, which gave her a venue to continue her literary activity after the death of her husband Alphonse Daudet in 1897. The French composer Jeanne Rivet used Julia Daudet’s text for her song ‘Pensee Matinale.”

In 1913, through her son Lucien Daudet, who was a good friend of Marcel Proust, she was one of the first readers of the manuscript of Remembrance of Things Past. She was immediately taken with the text and encouraged the author to persevere at a time when he was doubting his talent, since the novel had been rejected by many editors. In 1922 she became a chevalier of the Legion of Honour. She died in Paris at the age of 95.

== Works ==
- L'enfance d'une Parisienne, 1883
- Enfants et mères…, Lemerre, 1889
- Poésies, Lemerre, 1895
- Reflets sur le sable et sur l'eau, Lemerre, 1903
- Miroirs et mirages, Fasquelle, 1905
- Au bord des terrasses, Lemerre, 1907
- Souvenirs autour d'un groupe littéraire, Charpentier, 1910
- Quand Odile saura lire, Crès, 1919
- Journal de famille et de guerre, 1914–1919, Fasquelle, 1920
- Lumières et reflets, Lemerre, 1920
