= Lucien Daudet =

French writer (1878–1946)

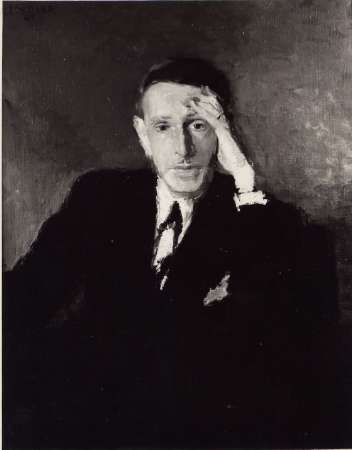
- Lucien Daudet in 1943
- Born: 11 June 1878; Paris, France
- Died: 16 November 1946 (aged 68)
- Occupations: Novelist and painter
- Spouse: Marie-Thérèse Daudet (m. 1943)

Lucien Daudet (French: [lysjɛ̃ dodɛ]; 11 June 1878 – 16 November 1946) was a French writer, the son of Alphonse Daudet and Julia Daudet. He was never really able to trump his father's greater reputation and is now primarily remembered for his romantic ties to fellow novelist Marcel Proust (In Search of Lost Time). Daudet was also friends with Jean Cocteau.

== Biography ==
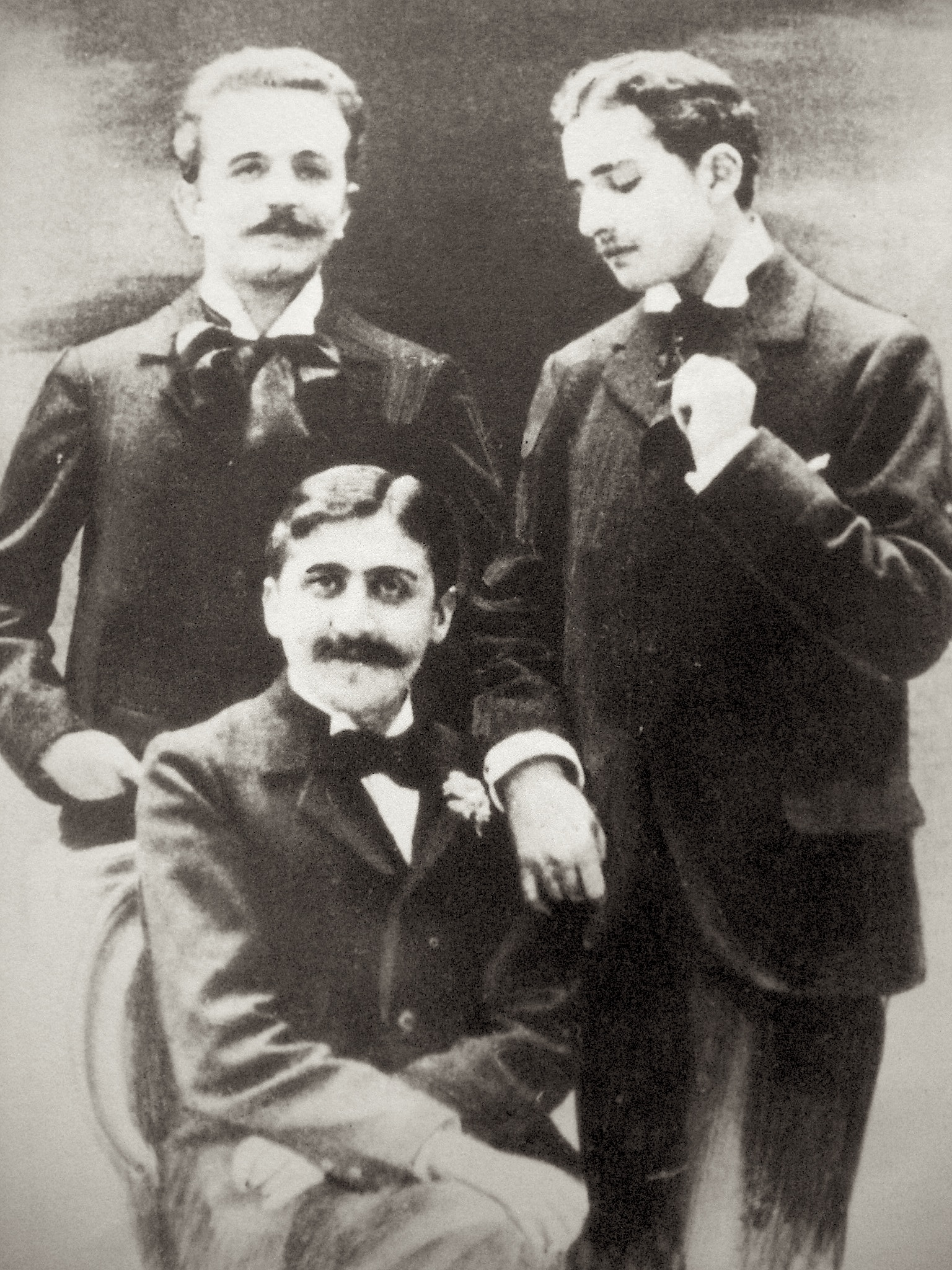
Marcel Proust (seated), Robert de Flers (left), and Lucien Daudet (right), ca. 1894

The Daudet family was composed of the father, Alphonse, the mother Julia (née Allard), Léon, the older brother, Edmée, and Lucien. Every member of the family wrote books: father, mother, brother, sister, sister-in-law (Marthe Allard under the pseudonym of “Pampille”) and uncle (Ernest Daudet). Lucien himself published about fifteen books.

Cultivated, “very beautiful, very elegant, a thin and frail young man, with a tender and a somewhat effeminate face”, according to Jean-Yves Tadié, Daudet lived a fashionable life which made him meet Marcel Proust. In 1897, Jean Lorrain publicly questioned the nature of Proust's relationship with Lucien Daudet. Proust challenged Lorrain to a duel over the implication that Proust and Daudet were lovers. Both duelists survived.

Lucien Daudet was also a painter. After having taken lessons at the Académie Julian, he was a pupil of Whistler and had an exposition together with Bernheim-Jeune in 1906. His tableaux are not known anymore except by literary allusions to them (correspondence of Proust; catalogue by Anna de Noailles).

All his life, Daudet was overshadowed by his father in literature ("I am the son of a man whose celebrity and talent count for several generations, I remain under his shade"), and by Whistler in painting ("He gave me a certain taste in painting, but also very great contempt for that which is not of first rank... and I apply this contempt to what I make.")

Towards the end of his life, in 1943, he married Marie-Thérèse, the younger sister of Pierre Benoit.

== Works ==
- Le Chemin mort, 1908
- La Fourmilière, 1909
- Le Prince des cravates, 1910
- L’Impératrice Eugénie, Fayard, 1911
- Calendrier, Ed. De La Sirène, 1922
- L’Inconnue, Flammarion, 1923
- Autour de 60 lettres de Marcel Proust, 1928
- Dans l’ombre de l’impératrice Eugénie, Gallimard, 1935
- Vie d’Alphonse Daudet, 1941
