= Le Petit Chose =

1868 memoir by Alphonse Daudet

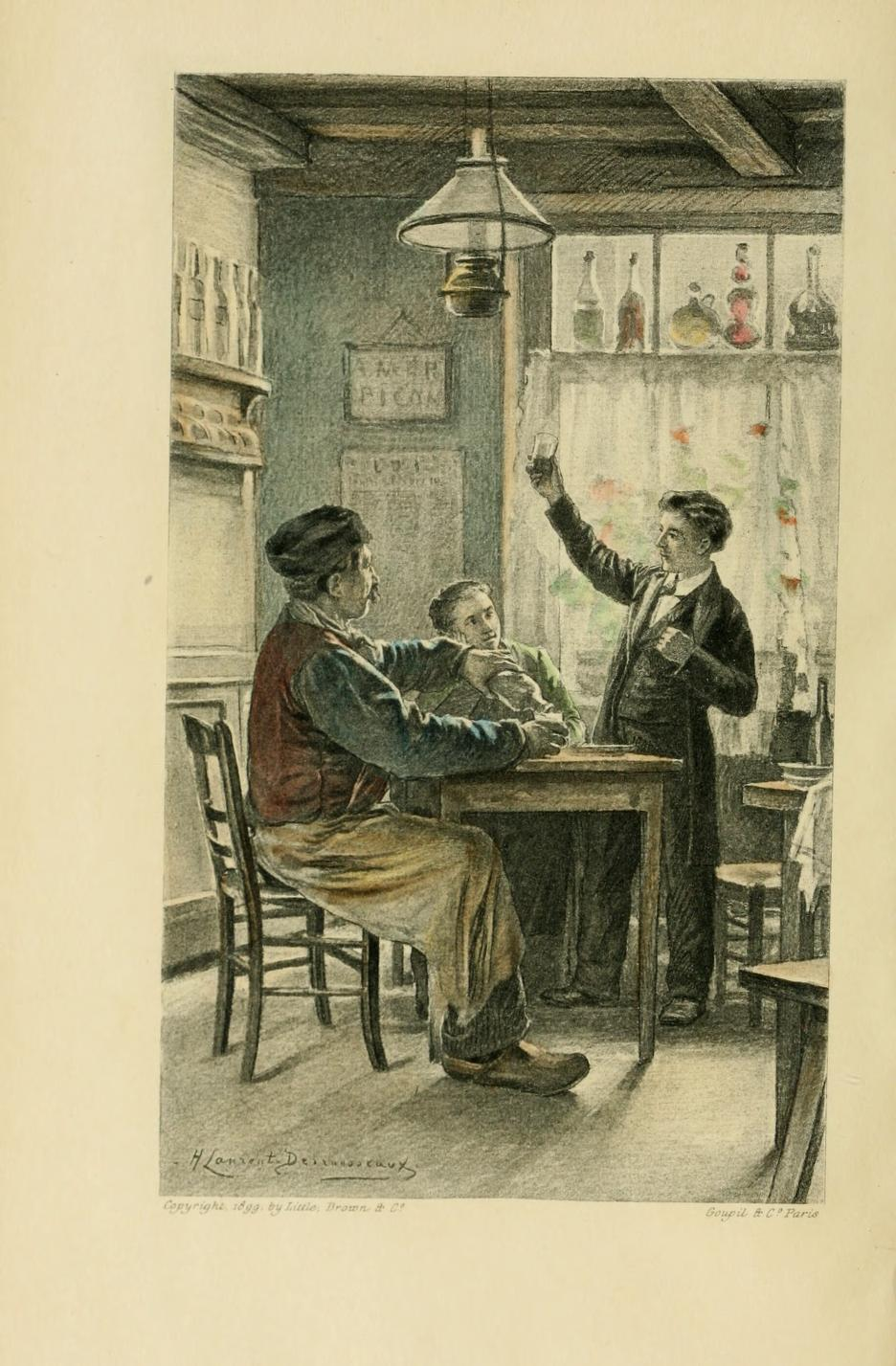
"A Toast!" From the 1898 Jane Segwick translation

Le Petit Chose (1868), translated into English as Little Good-For-Nothing (1878, Mary Neal Sherwood) and Little What's-His-Name (1898, Jane Minot Sedgwick), is an autobiographical memoir by French author Alphonse Daudet.

== Contents ==
Taking its title from the author's nickname, it recounts Daudet's early years from childhood, through boarding school and finally to Paris and his first successes as an author. It was Daudet's first published work, though not first written. It is semi-autobiographical.

== Influence ==
Canadian author Yann Martel (Life of Pi), in talking about his most memorable childhood book, recalled Le Petit Chose, saying that he read it when he was ten years old, and that it was the first time he found a book so heartbreaking that it moved him to tears.

== Film ==
In 1938, the book was made into the movie Le Petit Chose by French director Maurice Cloche. It starred Arletty, Marianne Oswald, and Marcelle Barry in the leading roles and featured then 14-year-old classical guitarist Ida Presti in a supporting role as a guitar player.
