= Jean Charles Dominique de Lacretelle =

French historian and journalist

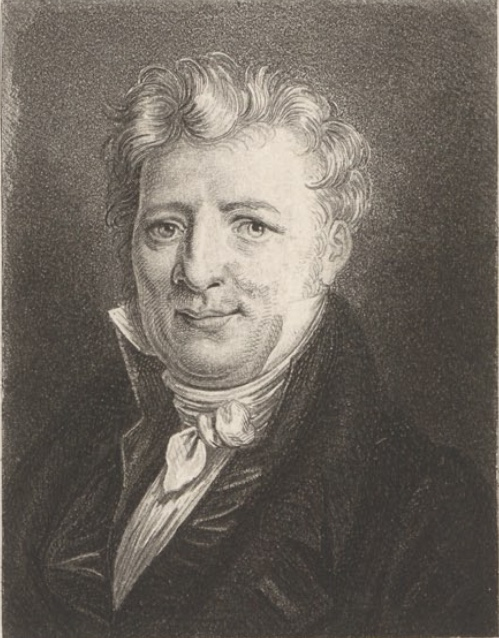
Charles de Lacretelle

Jean Charles Dominique de Lacretelle (3 September 1766 – 26 March 1855) was a French historian and journalist.

Called Lacretelle le jeune to distinguish him from his elder brother, Pierre Louis de Lacretelle. He was born at Metz. He was called to Paris by his brother in 1787, and during the French Revolution belonged, like Pierre, to the party of the Feuillants. He was for some time secretary to the duc de la Rochefoucauld-Liancourt, the famous philanthropist, and afterwards joined the staff of the Journal de Paris, then managed by Suard, and where he had as colleagues André Chénier and Jean-Antoine Roucher. He made no attempt to hide his monarchist sympathies, and these, together with the way in which he reported the trial and death of King Louis XVI, put him in danger of his life; to avoid this danger he enlisted in the army, but after Thermidor he returned to Paris and to his newspaper work.

He was involved in the royalist movement of the 13th Vendmiaire, and condemned to deportation after the 18th Fructidor; but, thanks to powerful influence, he was left forgotten in prison till after the 18th Brumaire, when he was set at liberty by Joseph Fouché. Under the Empire he was appointed a professor of history in the Faculté des lettres of Paris (1809), and elected as a member of the Académie française (1811). In 1827 he was prime mover in the protest made by the Académie française against the minister Peyronnet's law on the press, which led to the failure of that measure, but this step cost him, as it did Abel-François Villemain, his post as censeur royal.

Under Louis Philippe I, Lacretelle devoted himself to his teaching and literary work. In 1848 he retired to Mâcon; he was frequently the focus of social groups. He was known for his ability to talk with others and for being an attentive listener. He often shared stories about his past experiences with those around him. His son Pierre Henri (1815–1899) was a humorous writer and politician of purely contemporary interest.

== Works ==
JC Lacretelle's chief work is a series of histories of the 18th century, the Revolution and its sequel:

- Précis historique de la Revolution française, appended to the history of Rabaud St Etienne, and partly written in the prison of La Force (5 vols., 1801–1806)
- Histoire de France pendant le XVIII^{e} siècle (6 vols., 1808)
- Histoire de l'Assemblée Constituante (2 vols., 1821)
- L'Assemblée Legislative (1822)
- La Convention Nationale (3 vols., 1824–1825)
- Histoire de France depuis la restauration (1829–1835)
- Histoire du consulat et de l'empire (4 vols., 1846)

The author was a moderate and fair-minded man, but possessed neither great powers of style, nor striking historical insight, nor the special historian's power of writing minute accuracy of detail with breadth of view. Carlyle's sarcastic remark on Lacretelle's history of the Revolution, that it exists, but does not profit much, is partly true of all his books. He had been an eye-witness of and an actor in the events which he describes, but his testimony must be accepted with caution.
