= Pierre Louis de Lacretelle =

French politician

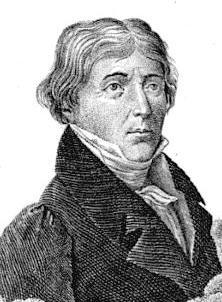
Pierre Louis de Lacretelle

Pierre Louis de Lacretelle (9 October 1751 – 5 September 1824) was a French lawyer, politician and writer.

He was born in Metz, the elder brother of Jean Charles Dominique de Lacretelle. He practised as a barrister in Paris. In 1784 he shared a prize for an award-winning essay with Maximilien Robespierre. Under the French Revolution he was elected as a député suppléant in the Constituent Assembly, and later as a deputy in the Legislative Assembly.

He belonged to the moderate party known as the Feuillants, but after 10 August 1792 he ceased to take part in public life. In 1803 he became a member of the Institut de France, taking the place of La Harpe. From 1806 he was a member of the Académie française.

Under the Restoration he was one of the chief editors of the Minerve française. He also wrote also an essay, Sur le 18 Brumaire (1799), some Fragments politiques et littéraires (1817), and a treatise Des partis politiques et des factions de ca pretendue aristocratie d'aujourd'hui (1819). In 1823, Bossange frères published his Œuvres complètes in 3 volumes.

== See also ==
- The Affaire Sanois
