= Ropartz =

Ropartz is a surname. Notable people with the surname include:

- Guy Ropartz (1864–1955), French composer and conductor
- Yves Ropartz (1903–1983), French racing cyclist
