= Rezonville =

Commune in Moselle, France

- Part of Rezonville-Vionville
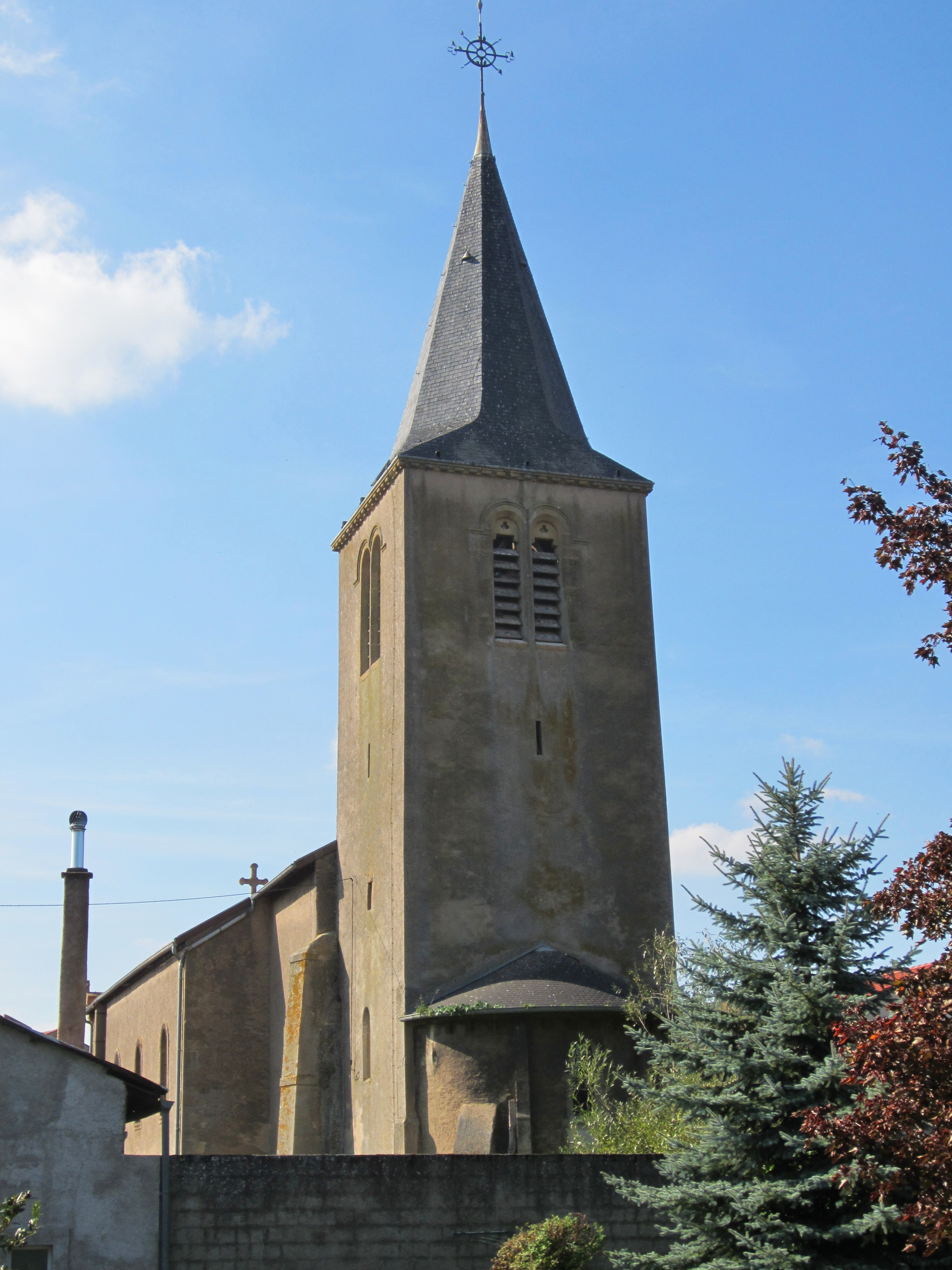
- The church in Rezonville

- Coat of arms
- Location of Rezonville
- Location within France Location within Grand Est
- Coordinates: 49°05′54″N 5°59′28″E
- Country: France
- Region: Grand Est
- Department: Moselle
- Arrondissement: Metz
- Canton: Les Coteaux de Moselle
- Commune: Rezonville-Vionville
- Area^{1}: 13.45 km^{2} (5.19 sq mi)
- Elevation: 300 m (980 ft)
- Highest elevation: 321 m (1,053 ft)
- Lowest elevation: 230 m (750 ft)
- Population (2022): 311
  - Density: 23.1/km^{2} (59.9/sq mi)
- Time zone: UTC+01:00 (CET)
  - Summer (DST): UTC+02:00 (CEST)
- Postal code: 57130
- ^{1} French Land Register data, which excludes lakes, ponds, glaciers > 1 km^{2} (0.386 sq mi or 247 acres) and river estuaries.

Rezonville (French pronunciation: [ʁəzɔ̃vil]) is a former commune in the Moselle department in Grand Est in north-eastern France. On 1 January 2019, it was merged into the new commune Rezonville-Vionville.

== See also ==
- Communes of the Moselle department
- Parc naturel régional de Lorraine
