= Alphonse Daudet =

French novelist (1840–1897)

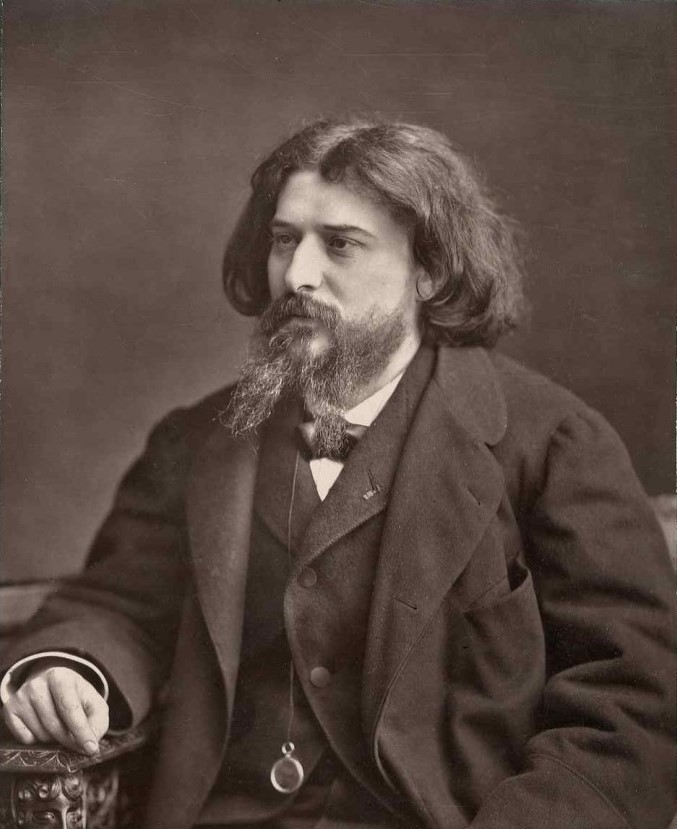
- Born: Louis Marie Alphonse Daudet; 13 May 1840; Nîmes, France
- Died: 16 December 1897 (aged 57); Paris, France
- Resting place: Père Lachaise Cemetery, Paris
- Occupations: Novelist; short story writer; playwright; poet
- Spouse: Julia Daudet
- Children: Léon Daudet; Lucien Daudet; Edmée Daudet
- Writing career
- Movement: Naturalism

Signature
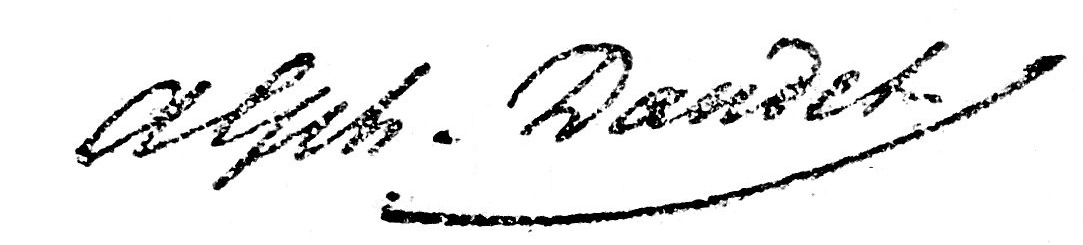

Louis Marie Alphonse Daudet (French: [alfɔ̃s dodɛ]; 13 May 1840 – 16 December 1897) was a French novelist and writer of short stories. He was the husband of Julia Daudet and father of Edmée, Léon and Lucien Daudet.

== Early life ==
Daudet was born in Nîmes, France, on 13 May 1840. His family, on both sides, belonged to the bourgeoisie. His father, Vincent Daudet, was a silk manufacturer—a man dogged through life by misfortune and failure. Alphonse, amid much truancy, had a depressing boyhood. In 1856 he left Lyon, where his schooldays had been mainly spent, and began his career as a schoolteacher at Alès, Gard, in the south of France. The position proved to be intolerable and Daudet said later that for months after leaving Alès he would wake with horror, thinking he was still among his unruly pupils. These experiences and others were reflected in his novel Le Petit Chose.

On 1 November 1857, he abandoned teaching and took refuge with his brother Ernest Daudet, three years his senior, who was trying, "and thereto soberly", to make a living as a journalist in Paris. Alphonse took to writing, and his poems were collected into a small volume, Les Amoureuses (1858), which met with a fair reception. He obtained employment on Le Figaro, then under Cartier de Villemessant's energetic editorship, wrote two or three plays, and began to be recognized in literary communities as possessing distinction and promise. Morny, Napoleon III's all-powerful minister, appointed him to be one of his secretaries—a post which he held till Morny's death in 1865.

== Literary career ==
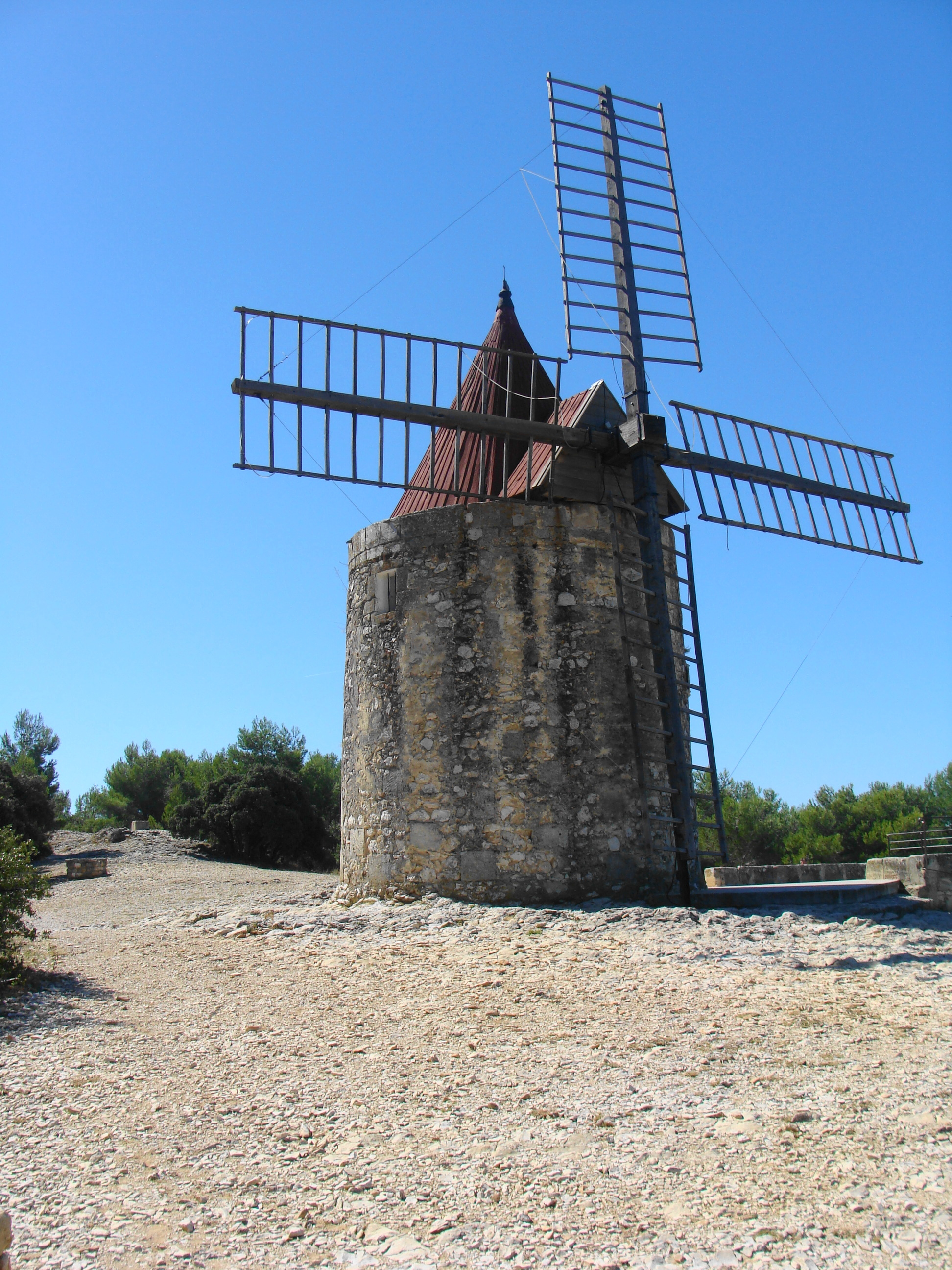
Daudet's mill

In 1866, Daudet's Lettres de mon moulin (Letters from My Windmill), written in Clamart, near Paris, and alluding to a windmill in Fontvieille, Provence, won the attention of many readers. The first of his longer books, Le Petit Chose (1868), did not, however, produce popular sensation. It is, in the main, the story of his own earlier years told with much grace and pathos. The year 1872 brought the famous Aventures prodigieuses de Tartarin de Tarascon, and the three-act play L'Arlésienne. But Fromont jeune et Risler aîné (1874) at once took the world by storm. It struck a note, not new certainly in English literature, but comparatively new in French. His creativeness resulted in characters that were real and also typical.

Jack, a novel about an illegitimate child, a martyr to his mother's selfishness, which followed in 1876, served only to deepen the same impression. Henceforward his career was that of a successful man of letters, mainly spent writing novels: Le Nabab (1877), Les Rois en exil (1879), Numa Roumestan (1881), Sapho (1884), L'Immortel (1888), and writing for the stage: reminiscing in Trente ans de Paris (1887) and Souvenirs d'un homme de lettres (1888). These, with the three Tartarins–Tartarin de Tarascon, Tartarin sur les Alpes, Port-Tarascon–and the short stories, written for the most part before he had acquired fame and fortune, constitute his life work.

L'Immortel is a bitter attack on the Académie française, to which august body Daudet never belonged. Daudet also wrote for children, including La Belle Nivernaise, the story of an old boat and her crew. In 1867 Daudet married Julia Allard, author of Impressions de nature et d'art (1879), L'Enfance d'une Parisienne (1883), and some literary studies written under the pseudonym "Karl Steen".

Daudet was far from faithful, and was one of a generation of French literary syphilitics. Having lost his virginity at the age of twelve, he then slept with his friends' mistresses throughout his marriage. Daudet would undergo several painful treatments and operations for his subsequently paralysing disease. His journal entries relating to the pain he experienced from tabes dorsalis are collected in the volume In the Land of Pain, translated by Julian Barnes. He died in Paris on 16 December 1897, and was interred at that city's Père Lachaise Cemetery.

- The story of Daudet's earlier years is told in his brother Ernest Daudet's Mon frère et moi. There is a good deal of autobiographical detail in Daudet's Trente ans de Paris and Souvenirs d'un homme de lettres, and also scattered in his other books. The references to him in the Journal des Goncourt are numerous.

== Political and social views, controversy and legacy ==
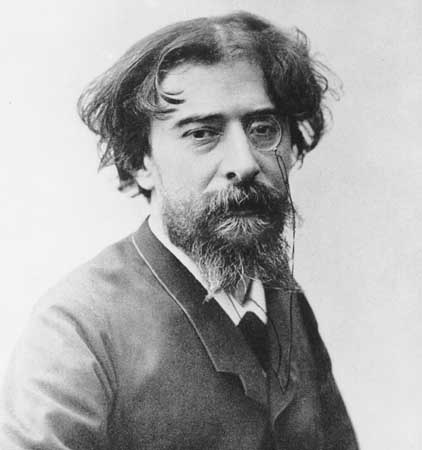
Portrait of Alphonse Daudet

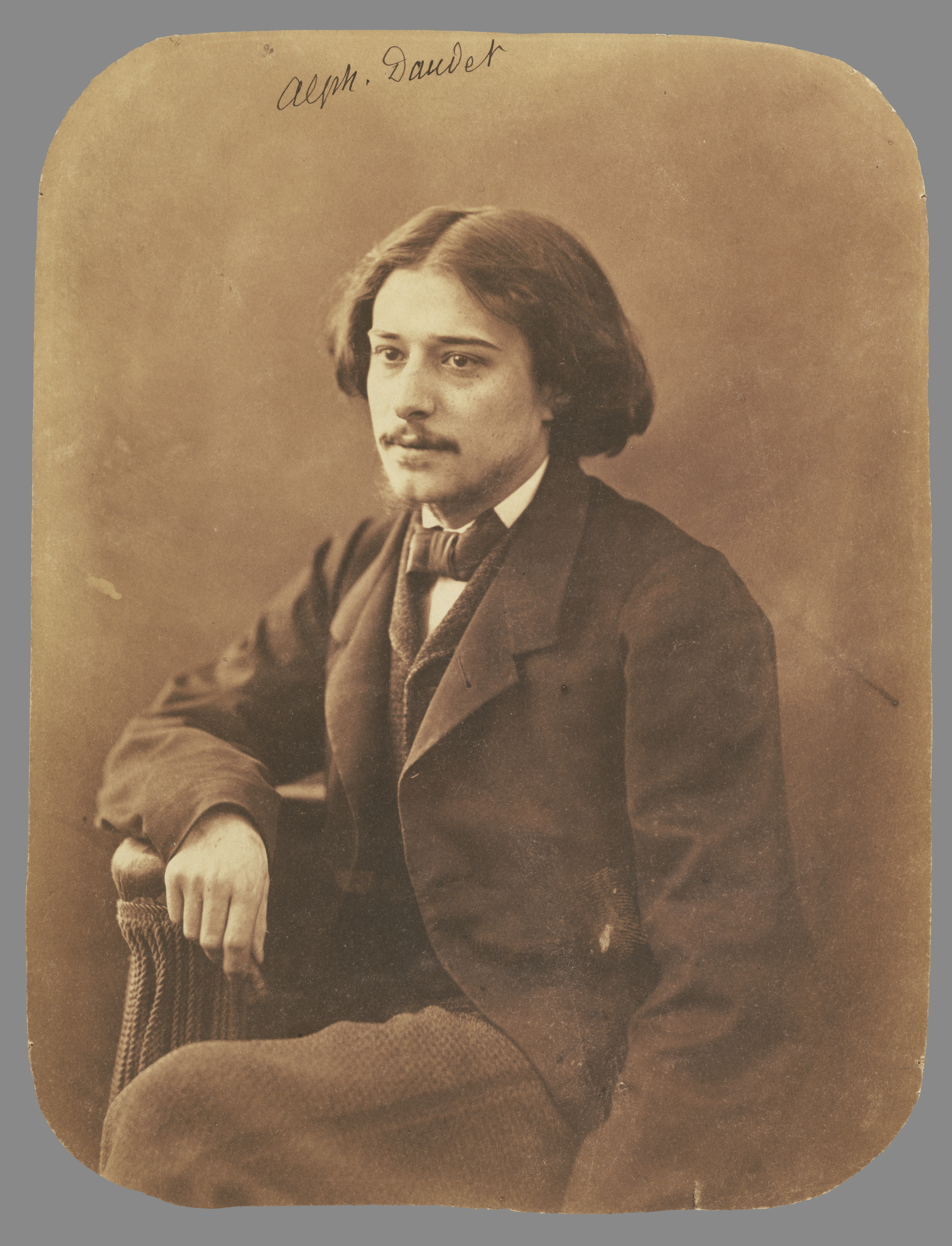
Alphonse Daudet, circa 1860 (The J. Paul Getty Museum)

Daudet was a monarchist and a fervent opponent of the French Republic. He was an antisemite, though less famously so than his son Léon. The main character of Le Nabab was inspired by a Jewish politician who was elected as a deputy for Nîmes. Daudet campaigned against him and lost. Daudet counted many antisemitic literary figures amongst his friends, including Edouard Drumont, who founded the Antisemitic League of France and founded and edited the anti-Semitic newspaper La Libre Parole. It has been argued that Daudet deliberately exaggerated his links to Provence to further his literary career and social success (following Frederic Mistral's success), including lying to his future wife about his "Provençal" roots.

Numerous colleges and schools in contemporary France bear his name and his books are widely read and several are in print.

== Works ==
Major works, and works in English translation (date given of first translation). For a complete bibliography see Works by Alphonse Daudet.

- Les Amoureuses (1858; poems, first published work).
- Le Petit Chose (1868; English: Little Good-For-Nothing, 1885; or Little What's-His-Name, 1898).
- Lettres de Mon Moulin (1869; English: Letters from my Mill, 1880, short stories).
- Tartarin de Tarascon (1872; English: Tartarin of Tarascon, 1896).
- L'Arlésienne (1872; novella originally part of Lettres de Mon Moulin made into a play)
- Contes du Lundi (1873; English: The Monday Tales, 1900; short stories).
- Les Femmes d'Artistes (1874; English: Artists' Wives, 1896).
- Robert Helmont (1874; English: Robert Helmont: the Diary of a Recluse, 1896).
- Fromont jeune et Risler aîné (1874; English: Fromont Junior and Risler Senior, 1894).
- Jack (1876; English: Jack, 1897).
- Le Nabab (1877; English: The Nabob, 1878).
- Les Rois en Exil (1879; English: Kings in Exile, 1896).
- Numa Roumestan (1880; English: Numa Roumestan: or, Joy Abroad and Grief at Home, 1884).
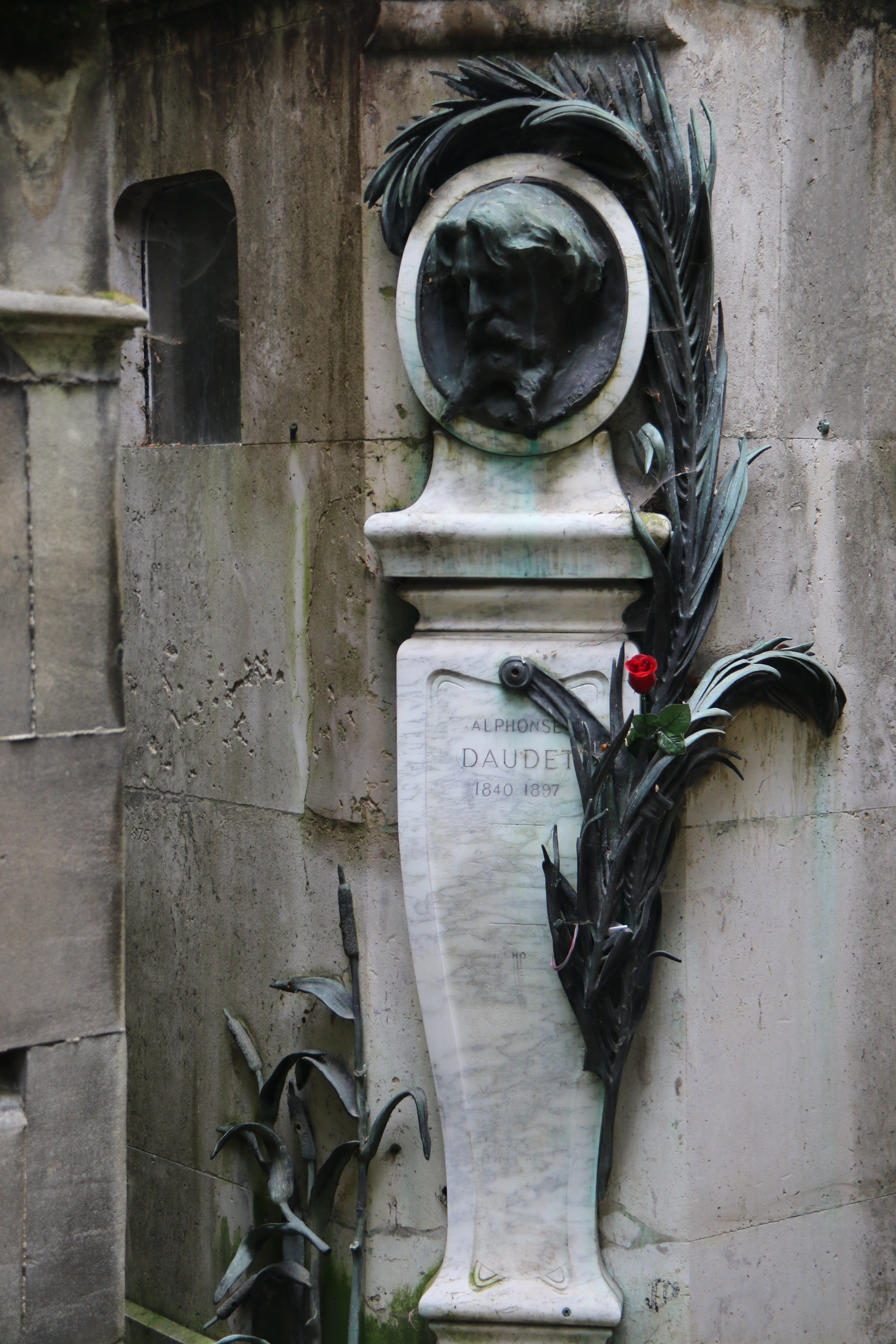
  Daudet's Grave at Père Lachaise Cemetery, Paris
- L'Evangéliste (1883; English: The Evangelist, 1883).
- Sapho (1884); (English: Sappho, 1886).
- Tartarin sur les Alpes (1885; English: Tartarin on the Alps, 1891).
- La Belle Nivernaise (1886; English: La Belle Nivernaise, 1892, juvenile).
- L'Immortel (1888; English: One of the Forty, 1888).
- Port-Tarascon (1890; English: Port Tarascon, 1890).
- Rose and Ninette (1892; English: Rose and Ninette, 1892).
- Batisto Bonnet (1894), Un paysan du Midi. Vie d'enfant (in French), translated by Alphonse Daudet, Paris: E. Dentu, p. 503
- La Doulou (1930; English: In The Land of Pain, 2003; translator: Julian Barnes).
- The Last Lesson

== Honours and Awards ==
- Officier of the Order of Legion of Honour
