= Washington Flats =

- U.S. National Register of Historic Places
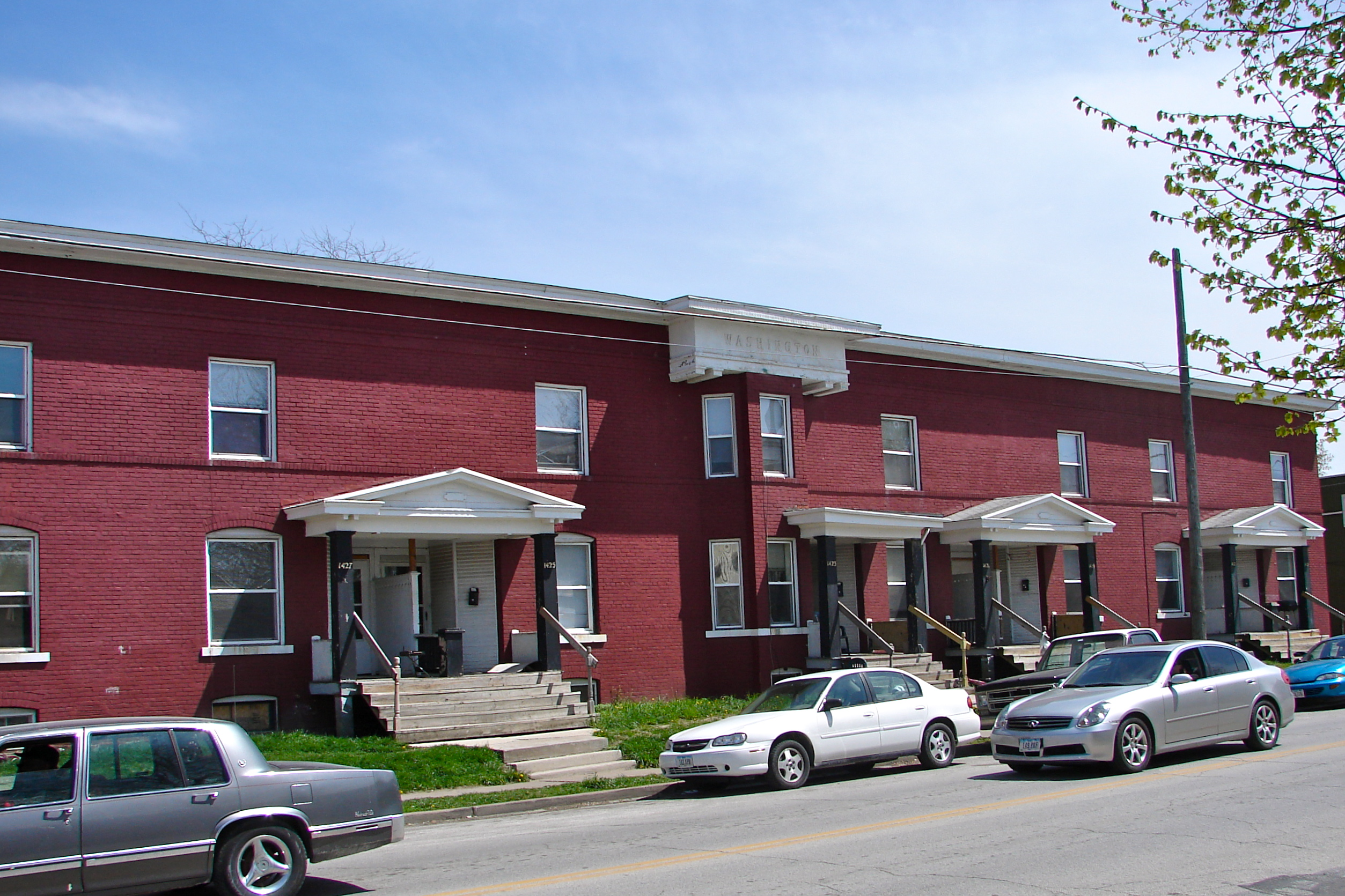
- Washington Flats in 2011

- Location within Iowa Location within the United States
- Location: 1415-1431 Washington St., Davenport, Iowa
- Coordinates: 41°32′4″N 90°35′45″W
- Area: less than one acre
- Built: 1905
- Architectural style: Neoclassical
- MPS: Davenport MRA
- NRHP reference No.: 84001584
- Added to NRHP: July 27, 1984

Washington Flats is located in the old northwest section of Davenport, Iowa, United States. It has been listed on the National Register of Historic Places since 1984.

== Architecture ==
Washington Flats is a local expression of the urban row houses that were built after the mid-19th century in Davenport. It was designed in a simplified Neoclassical style that was typical of many structures built in the city around the turn of the 20th century. The building is a long two-story brick structure with four double entrances into the apartments across the front of the building. A bay window with a fifth entrance is in the center of the building. The porches with shared entrances have partial cornice returns. They also have a screen with wood cut-outs between each doorway. The building features a corbelled brick belt course, and egg-and-dart molding on the facia of the metal cornice.
