= Egg-and-dart =

Ornamental device alternating ovals with points

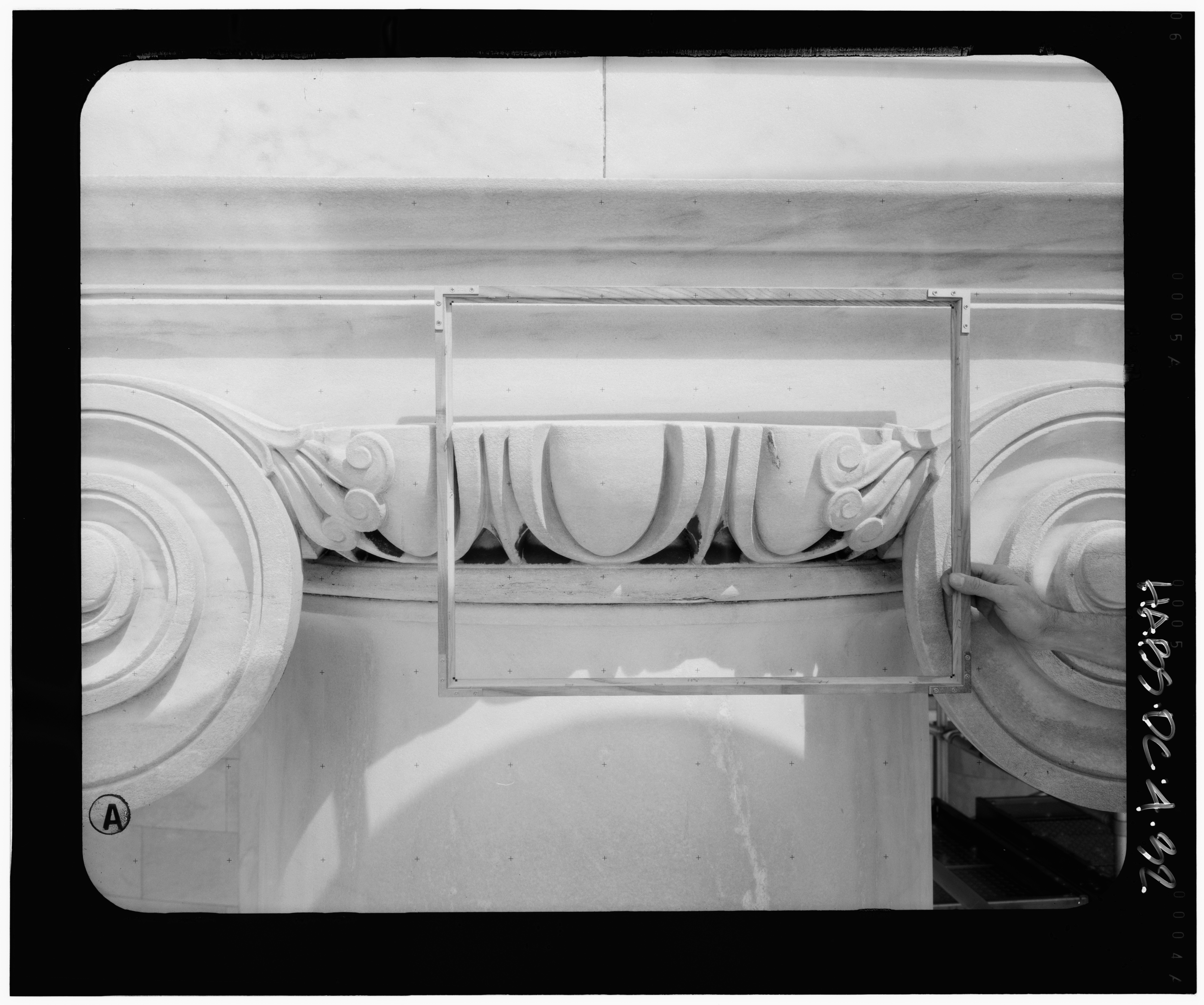
Egg-and-dart molding at the top of an Ionic capital at the Jefferson Memorial

Egg-and-dart, also known as egg-and-tongue, egg-and-anchor, or egg-and-star, is an ornamental device adorning the fundamental quarter-round, convex ovolo profile of moulding, consisting of alternating details on the face of the ovolo—typically an egg-shaped object alternating with a V-shaped element (e.g., an arrow, anchor, or dart). The device is carved or otherwise fashioned into ovolos composed of wood, stone, plaster, or other materials.

Egg-and-dart enrichment of the ovolo molding of the Ionic capital was used by ancient Greek builders, so it is found in ancient Greek architecture (e.g., the Erechtheion at the Acropolis of Athens), was used later by the Romans and continues to adorn capitals of modern buildings built in Classical styles (e.g., the Ionic capitals of the Jefferson Memorial in Washington, D.C., or the ones of the Romanian Athenaeum from Bucharest). Its ovoid shape (the egg) and serrated leaf (the dart) are believed to represent the opium poppy and its leaves. The moulding design element continues in use in neoclassical architecture. As a mass-produced architectural motif at the turn of the 19th to the 20th century, it can, when seen alongside dentils (tooth-like blocks of wood in rows), be used to date a building to the Edwardian period, which began with the death of Queen Victoria in 1901.

== Gallery ==
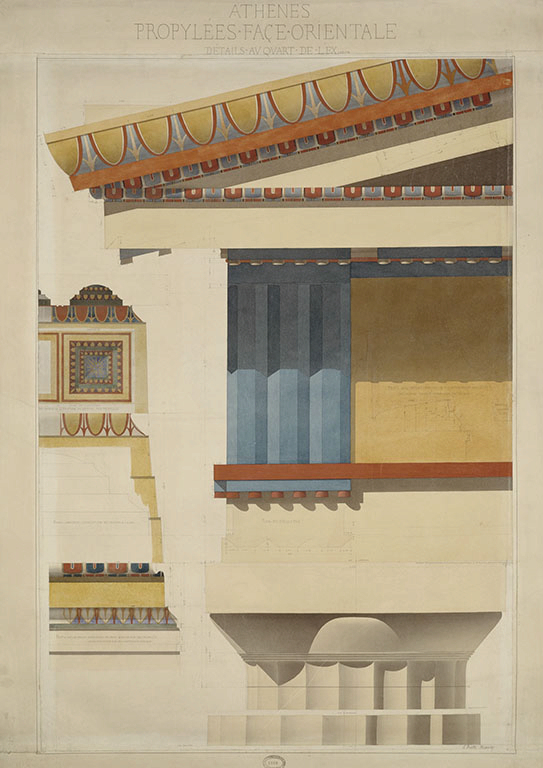
Polychrome Ancient Greek egg-and-dart on the last molding on the top of the pediment from the Propylaia, Athens, unknown architect, 437-432 BC

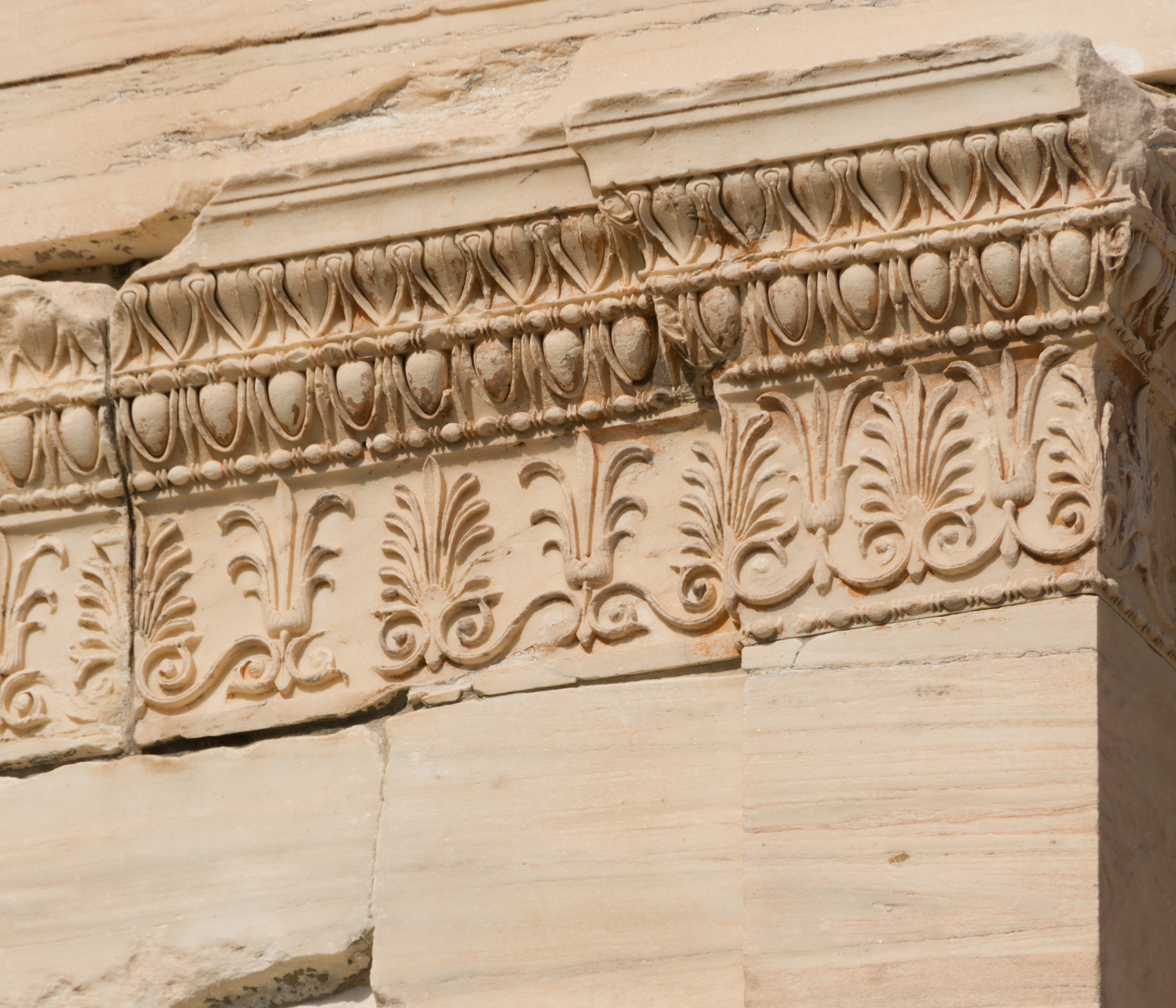
Ancient Greek egg-and-dart on the Erechtheion, Athens, Greece, unknown architect or sculptor, 421-405 BC

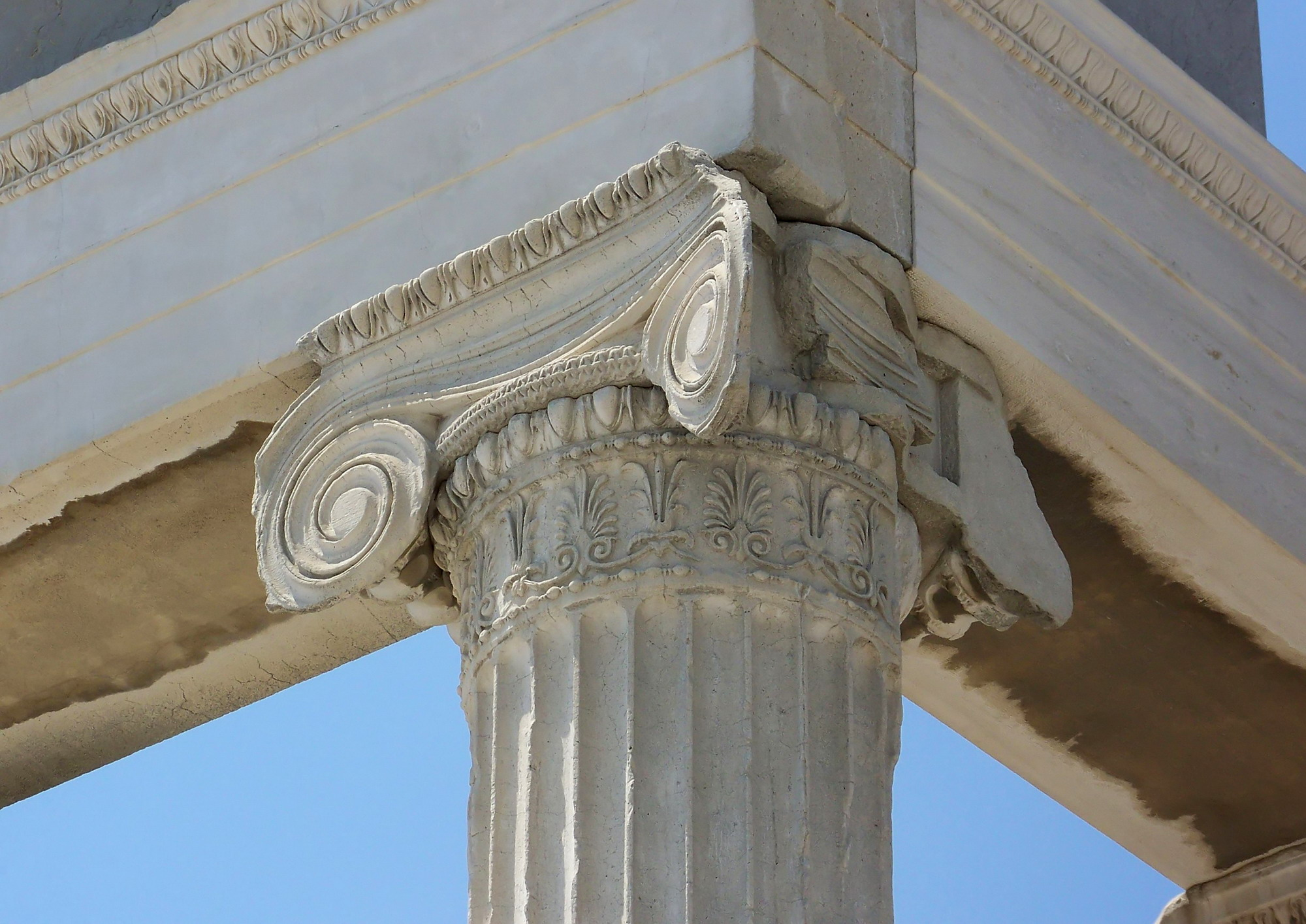
Ancient Greek egg-and-dart on an Ionic capital of the Erechtheion

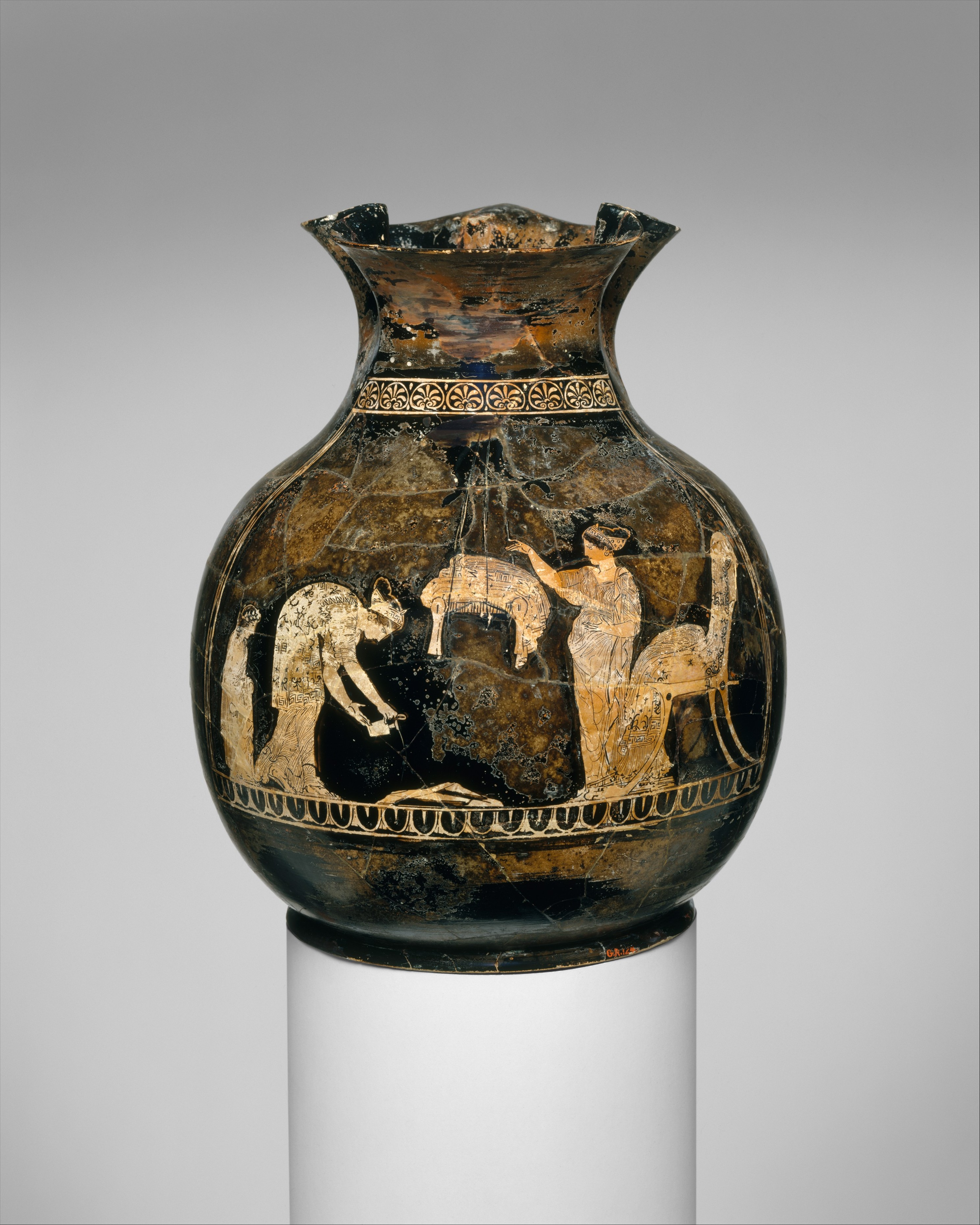
Ancient Greek egg-and-dart painted on the lower part of an oenochoe, by the Meidias Painter, 420–410 BC, terracotta, Metropolitan Museum of Art, New York City

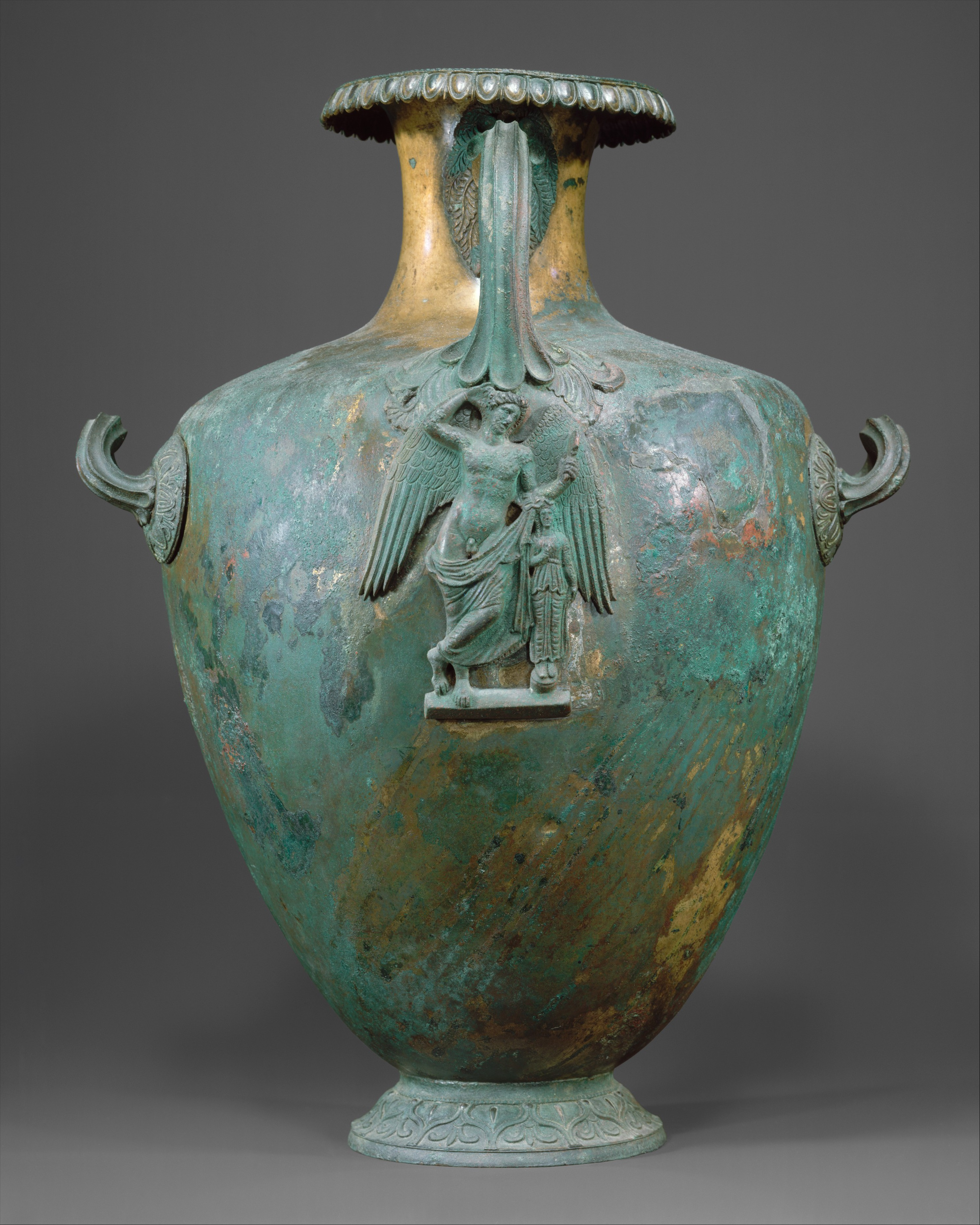
Ancient Greek egg-and-dart on a hydria (water jar), 4th century BC, bronze, Metropolitan Museum of Art

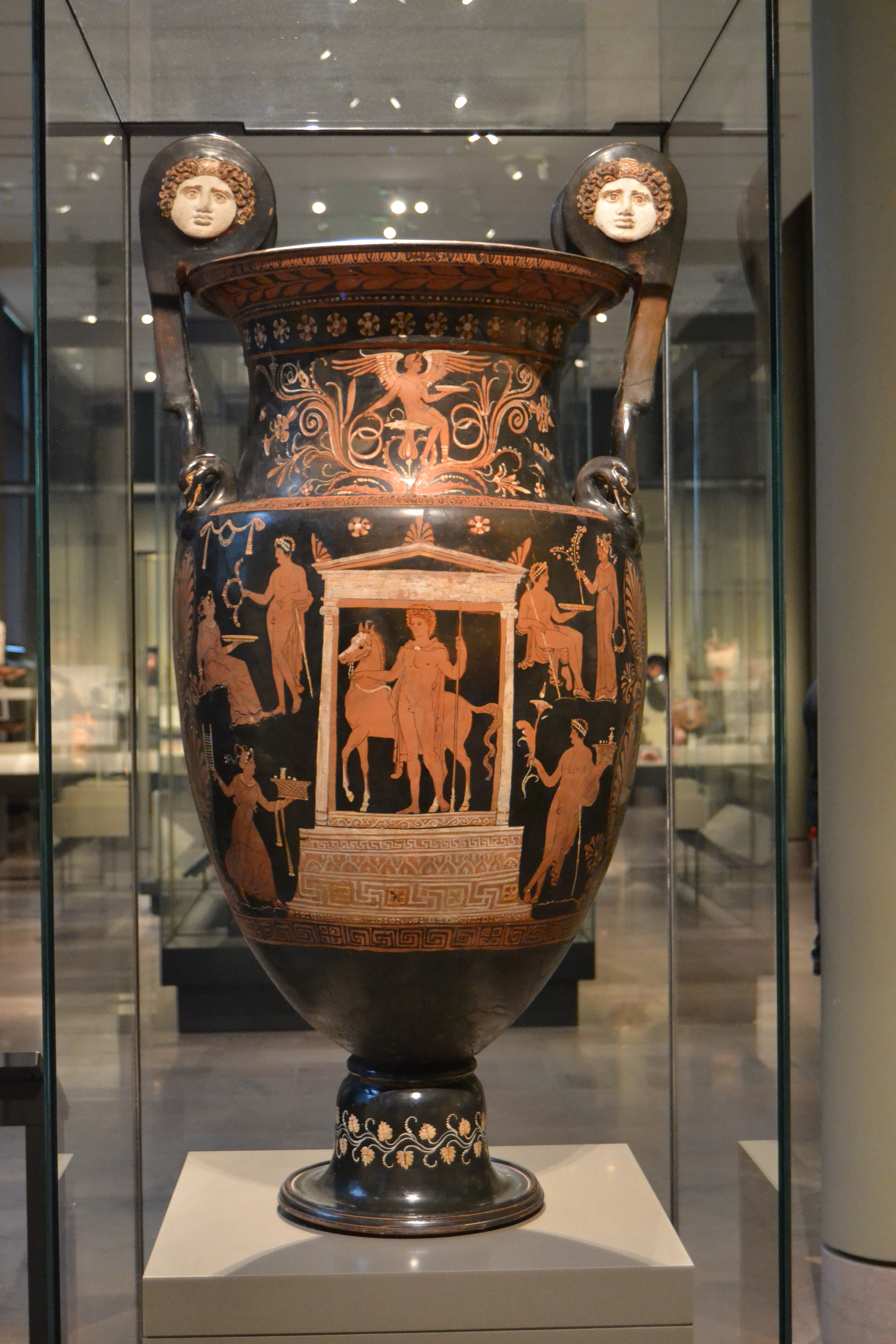
Ancient Greek egg-and-dart on the lip of a krater, 375-350 BC, ceramic, Museum of Fine Arts, Boston, US

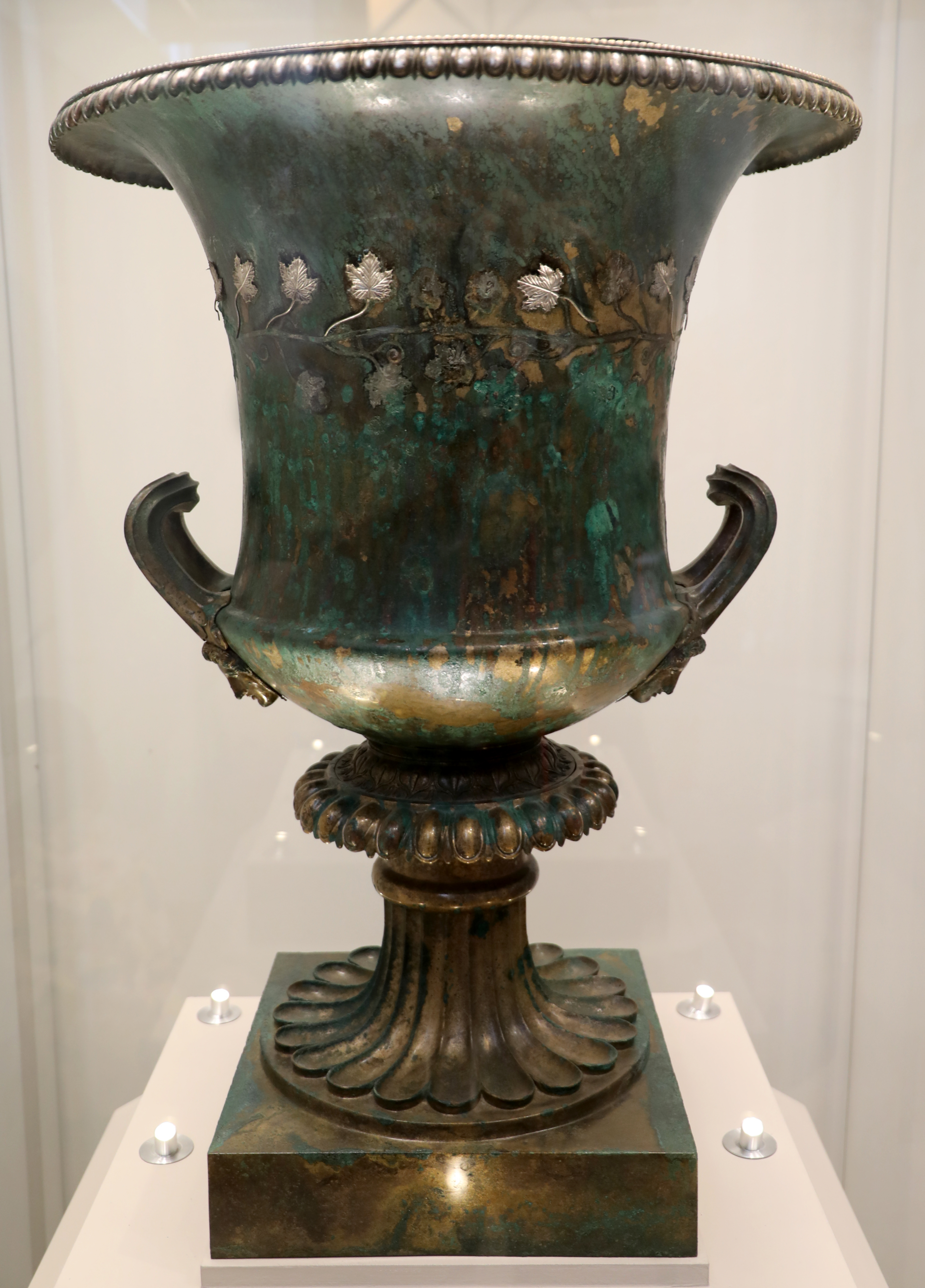
Ancient Greek egg-and-dart on a calyx-krater, c.340 BC, bronze, National Archaeological Museum, Athens

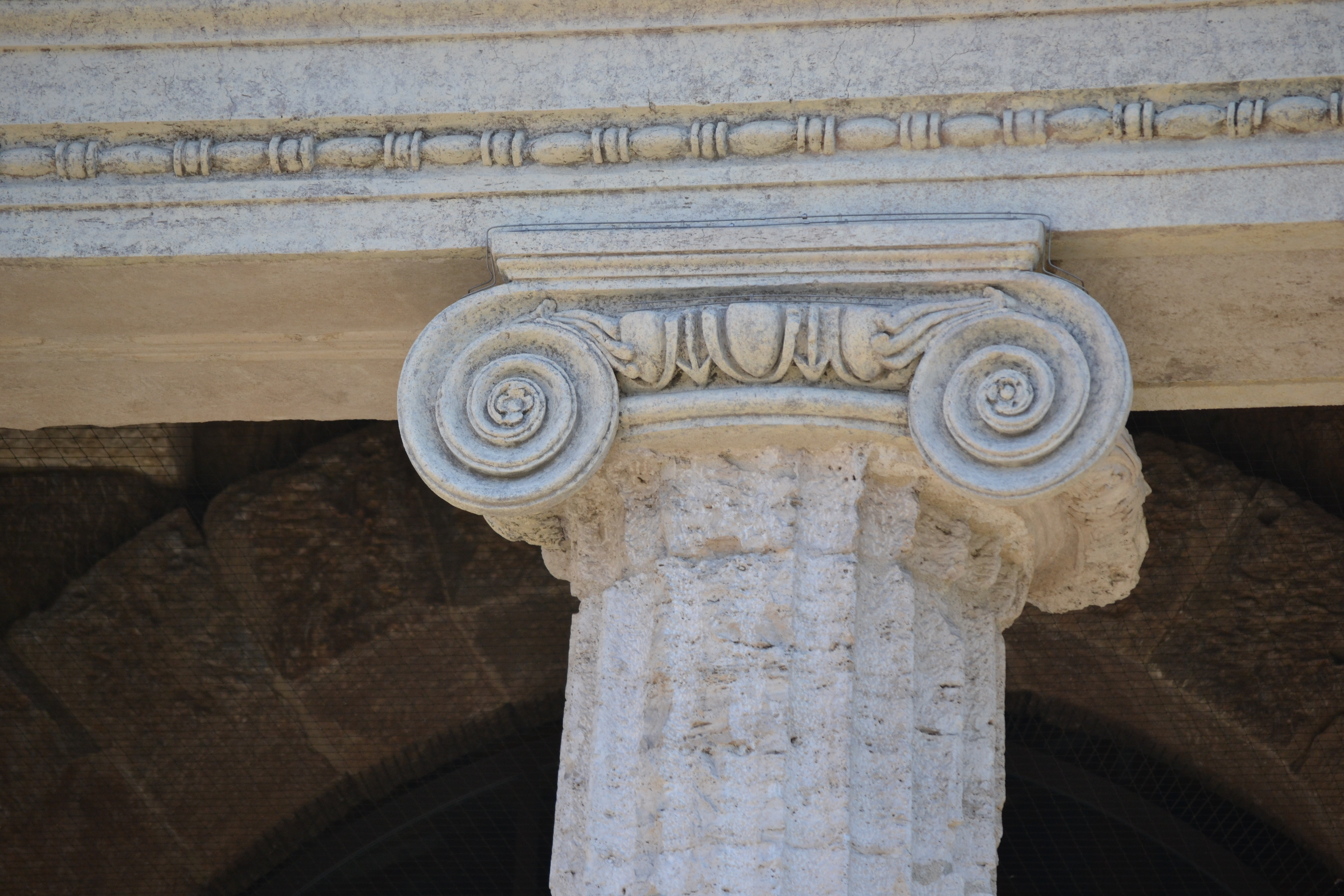
Roman egg-and-dart on an Ionic capital from the Temple of Portunus, Rome, unknown architect or sculptor, early 4th century BC

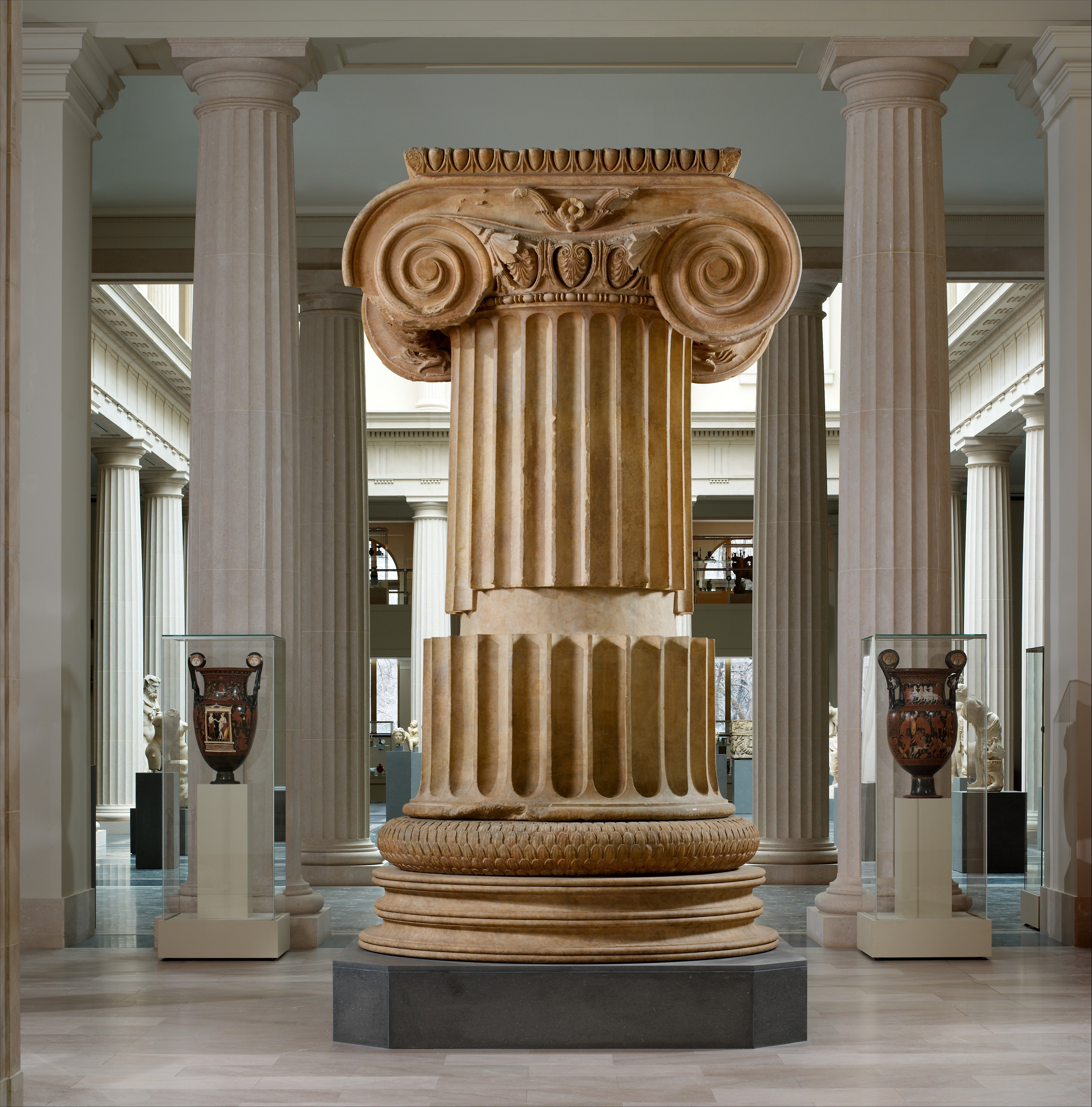
Ancient Greek egg-and-dart on the abacus and with palmettes on them between the volutes of an Ionic column from the Temple of Artemis in Sardis, Turkey, c.300 BC, marble, Metropolitan Museum of Art

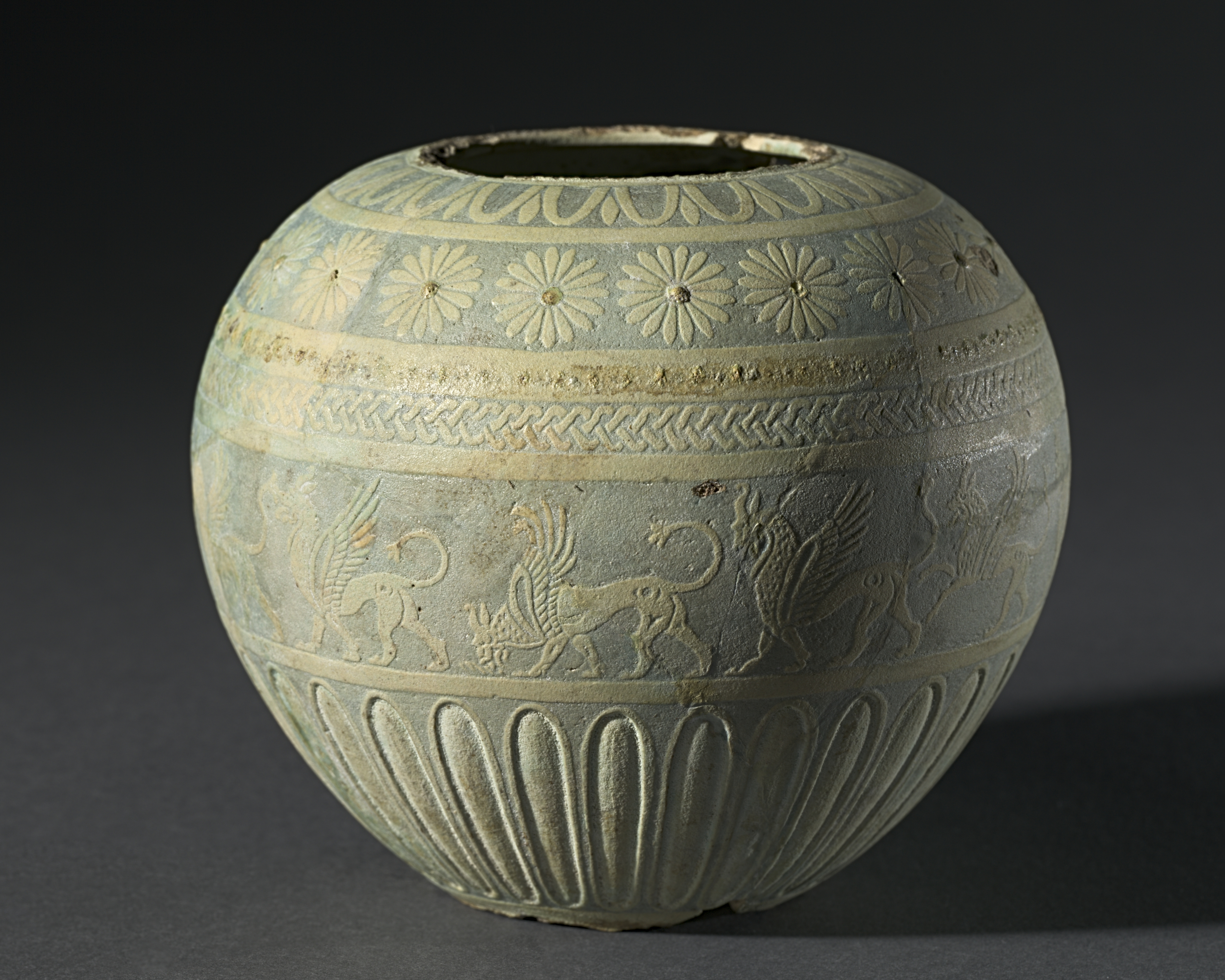
Ancient Greek egg-and-dart on an Ancient Egyptian Mit Rahina ware vessel, c.200 BC, faience, Cleveland Museum of Art, Cleveland, US

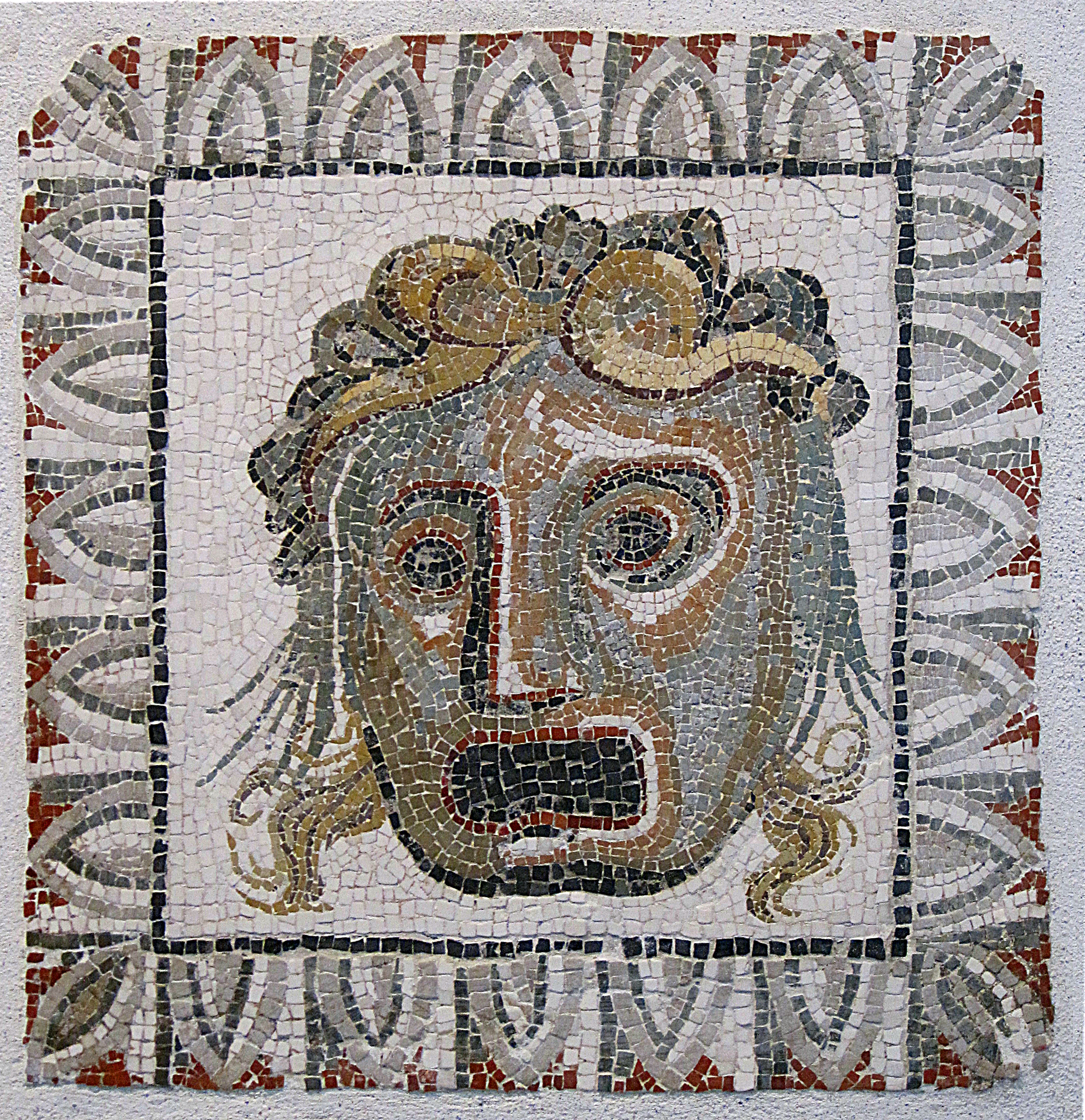
Roman egg-and-dart on a mosaic with a Dionisiac theatre mask, late 1st century BC, mosaic, National Roman Museum of Palazzo Massimo, Rome

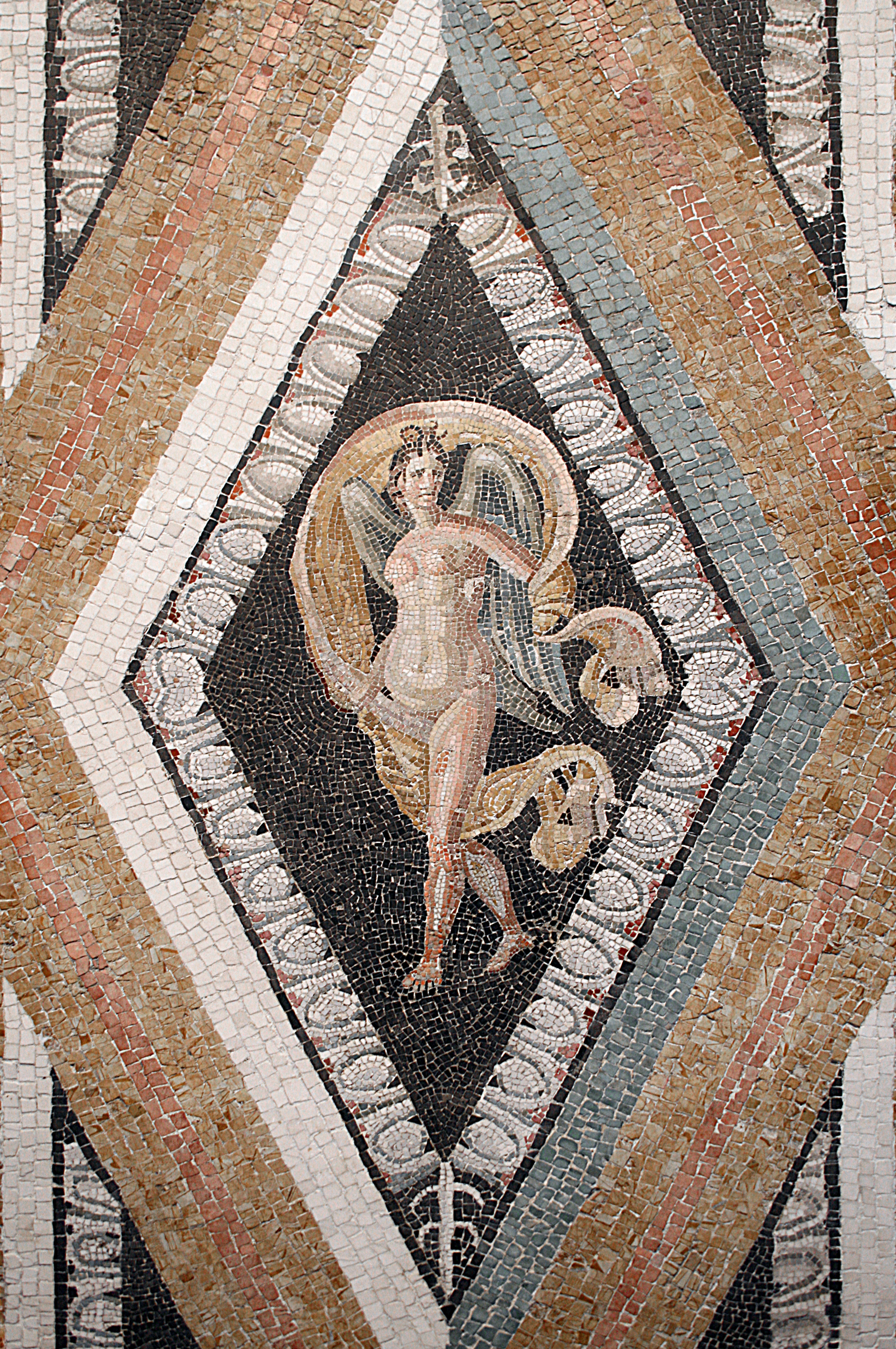
Roman egg-and-dart on a mosaic with Nike, unknown date, mosaic, National Roman Museum of Palazzo Massimo

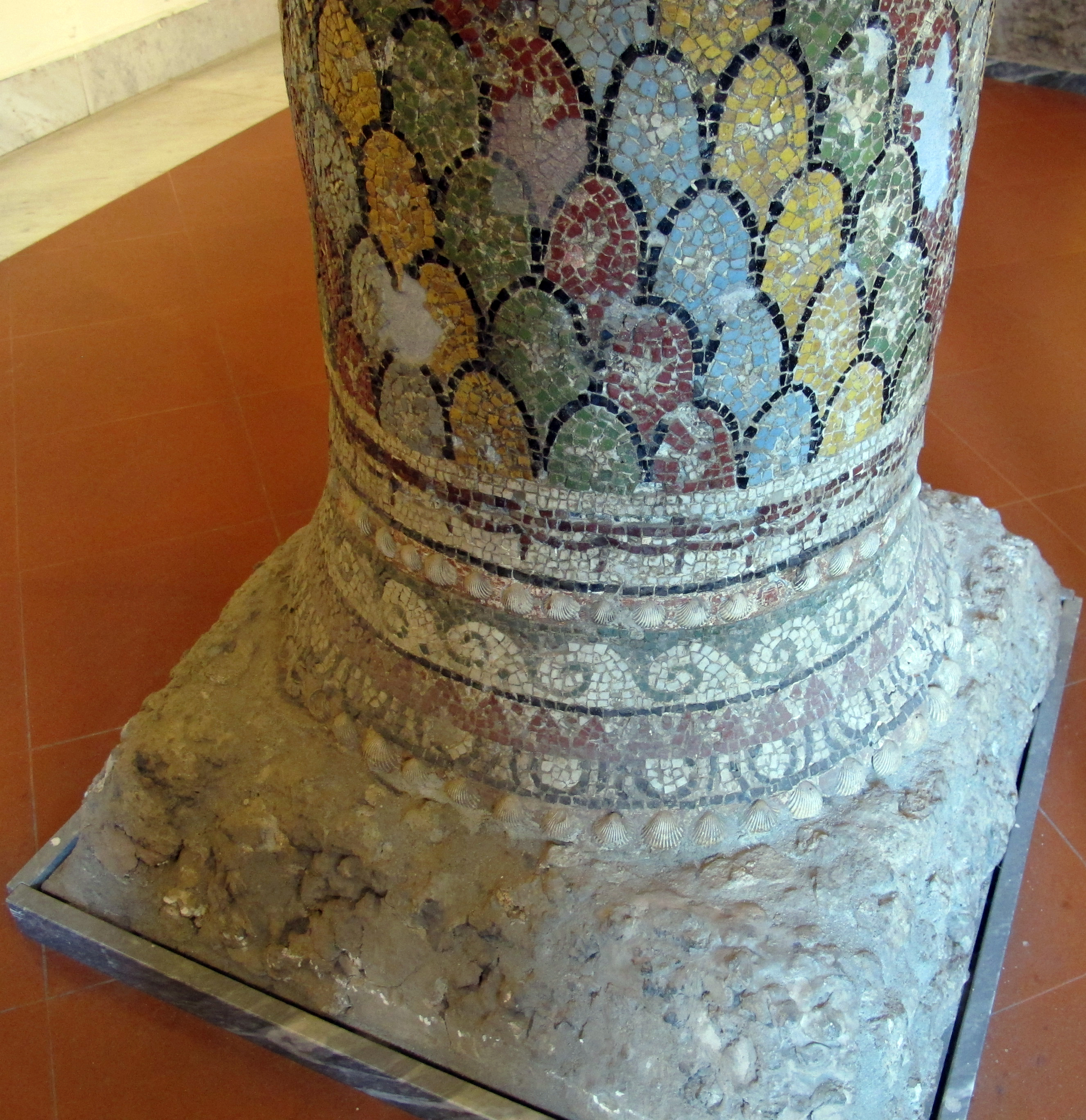
Roman egg-and-dart on the base of a column, unknown date, mosaic, National Archaeological Museum, Naples

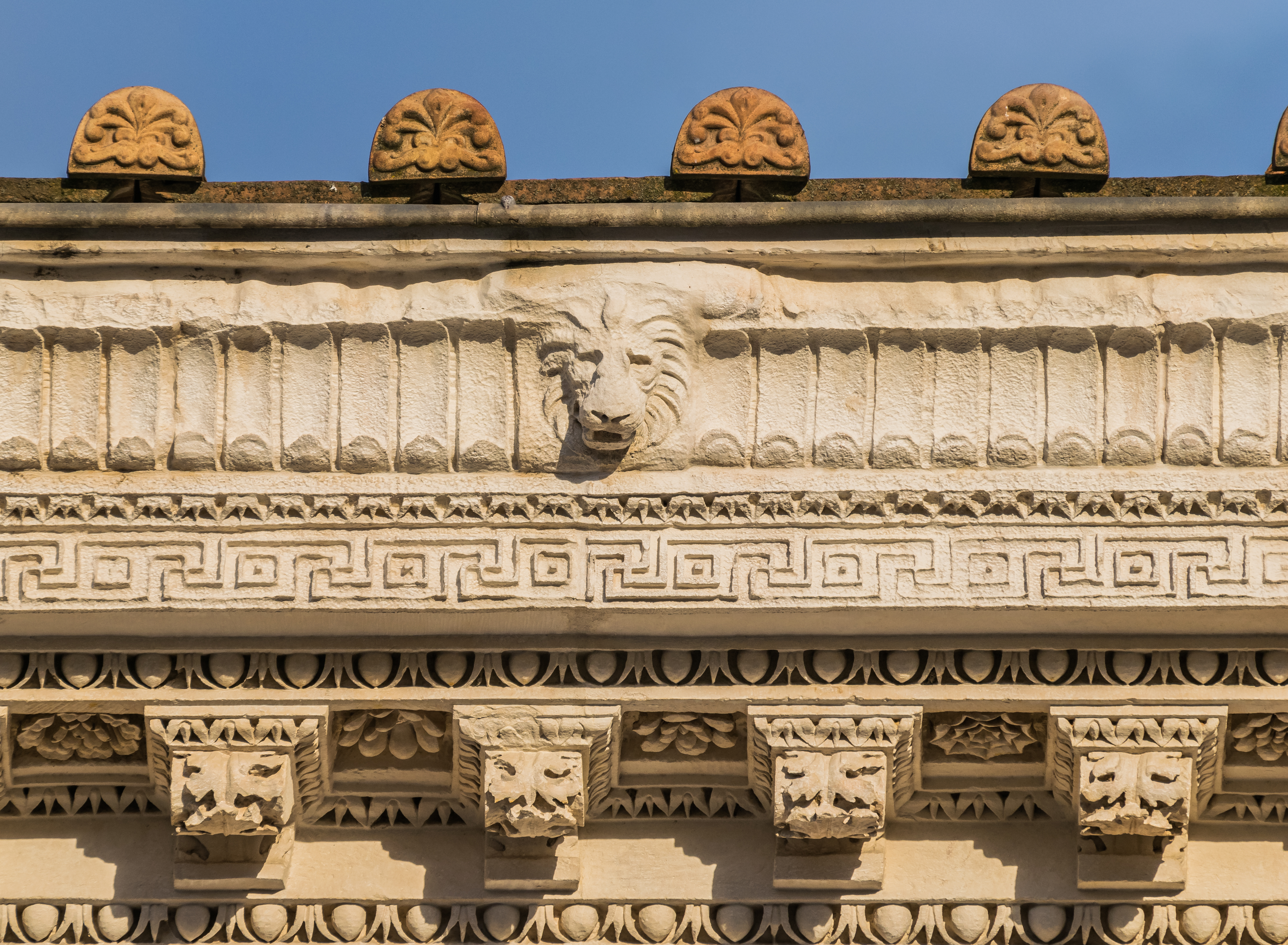
Roman egg-and-dart on the cornice of the Maison carrée, Nîmes, France, unknown architect or sculptor, 2 AD

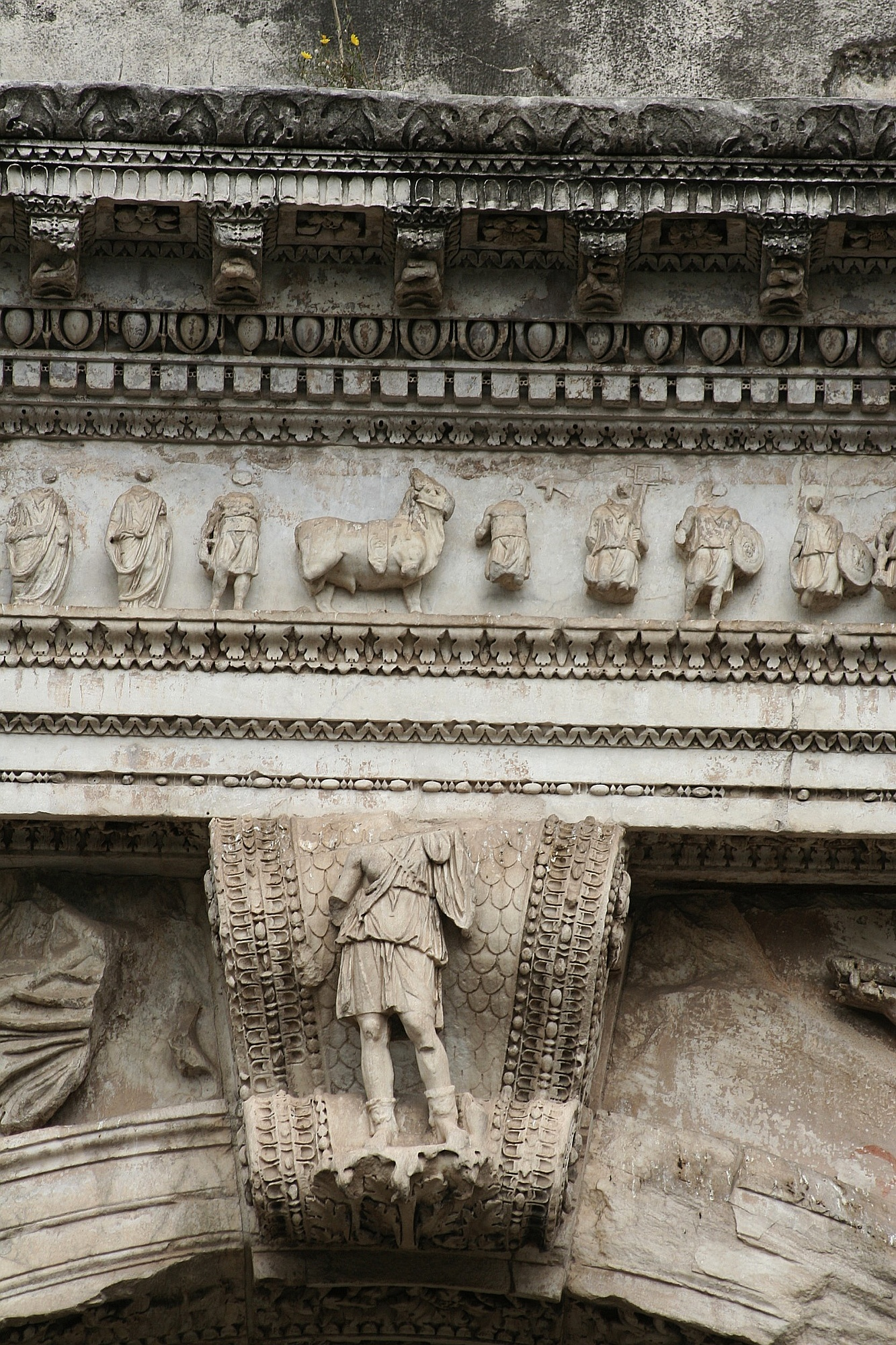
Roman egg-and-dart on the Arch of Titus, Rome, unknown architect or sculptor, 1st-century AD

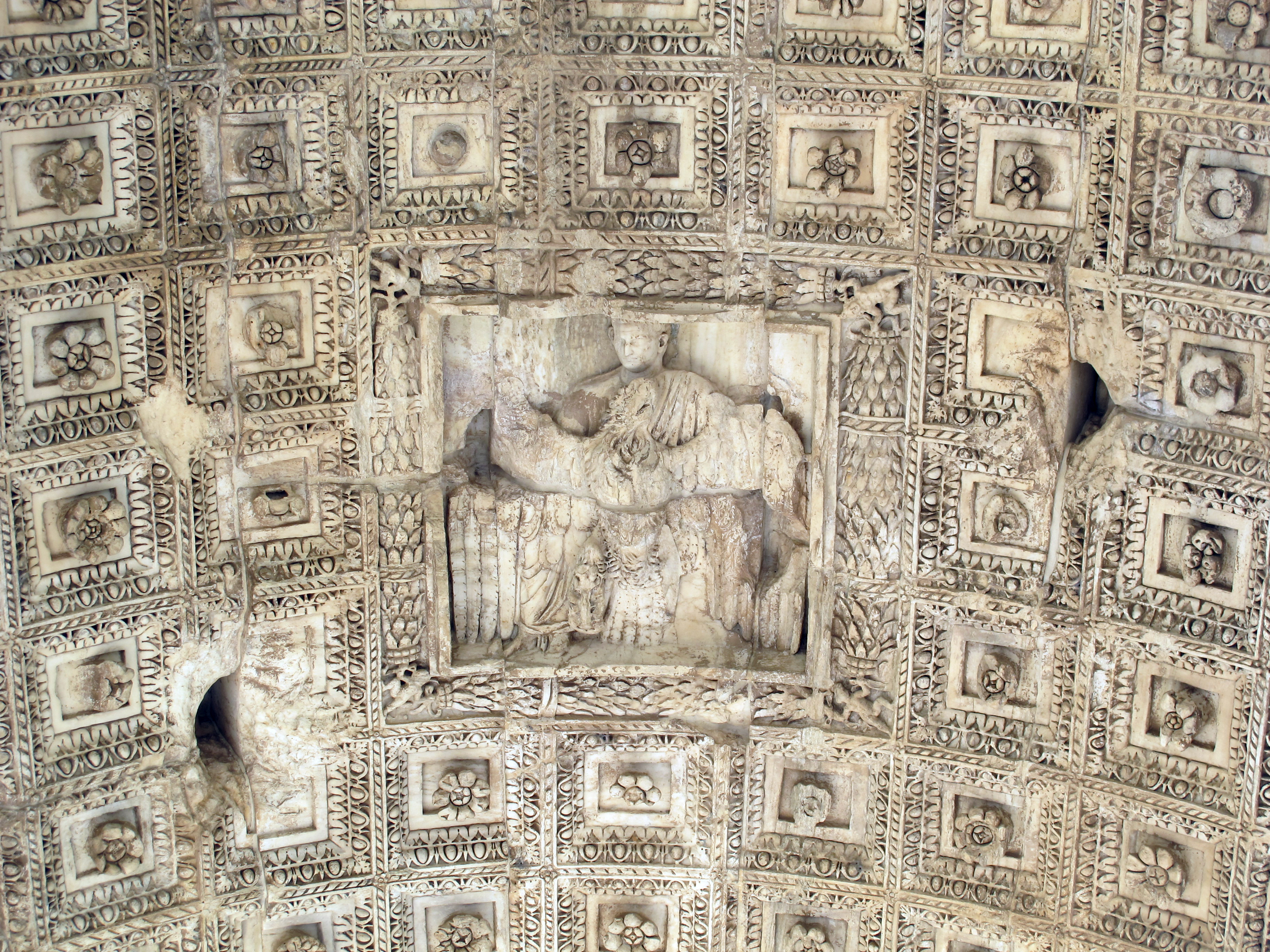
Roman egg-and-dart in the coffers on the ceiling in the Arch of Titus

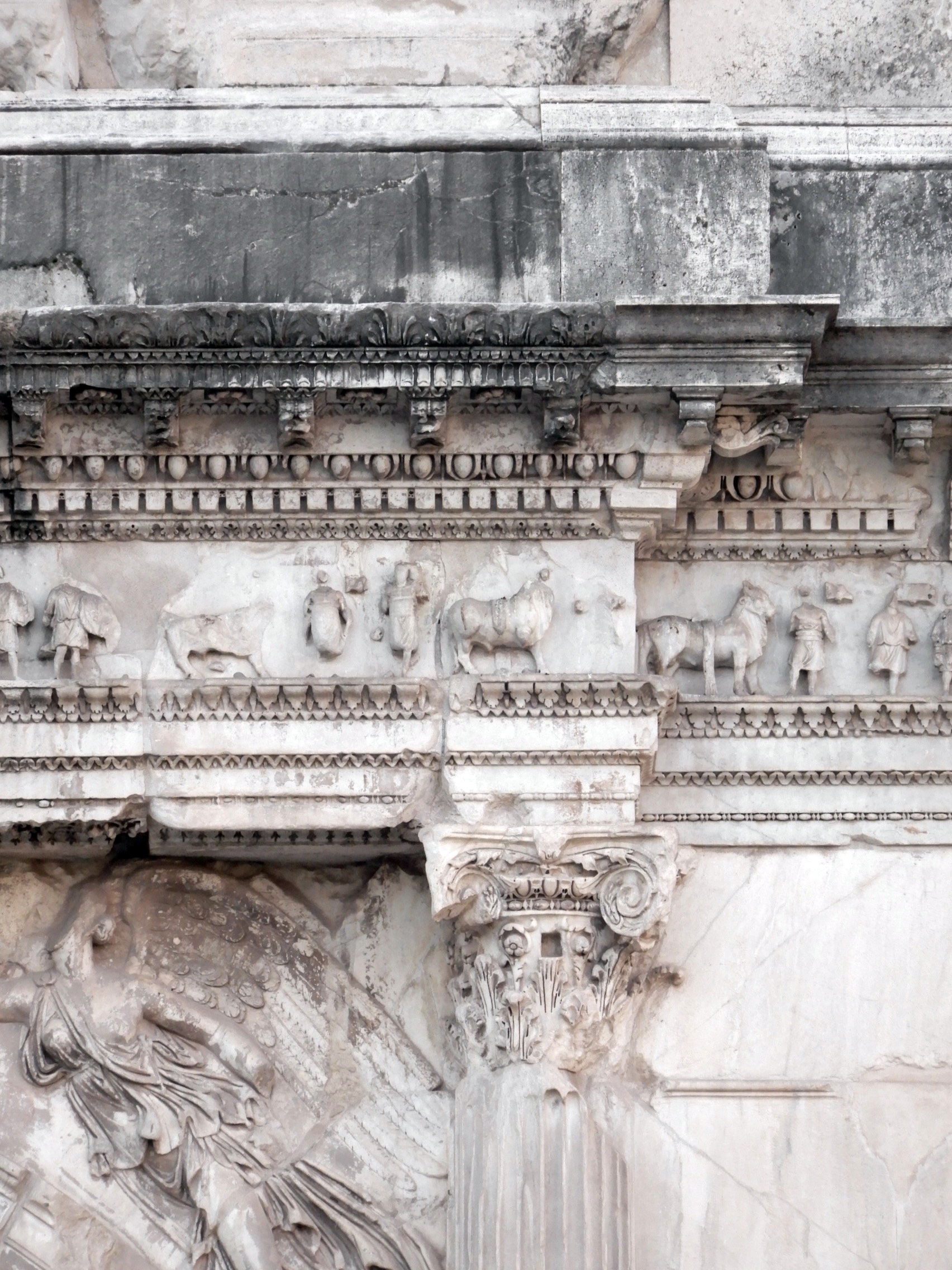
Roman egg-and-dart on a Composite capital of the Arch of Titus

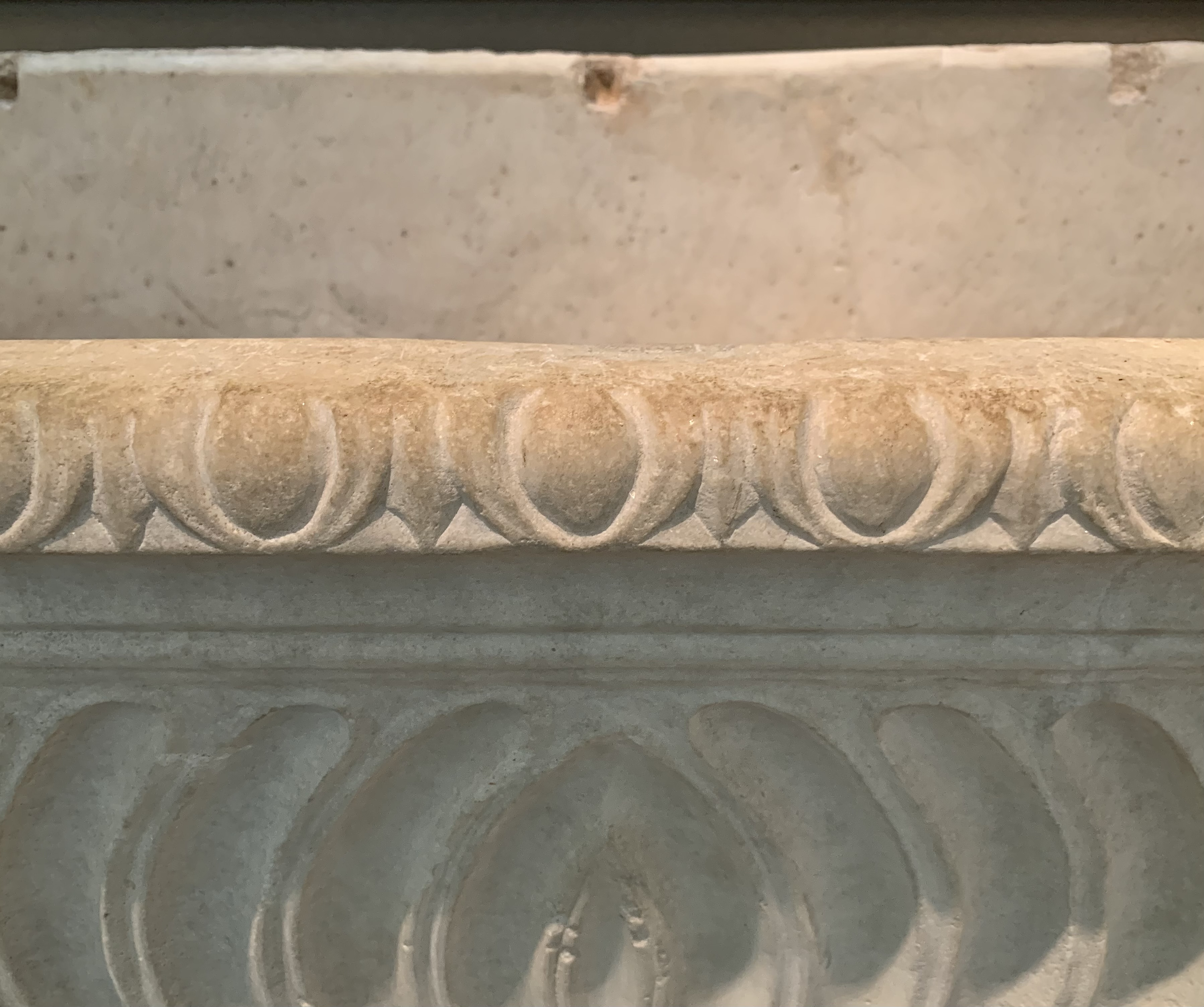
Roman egg-and-dart on a sarcophagus with lions, 3rd century AD, marble, Neues Museum, Berlin

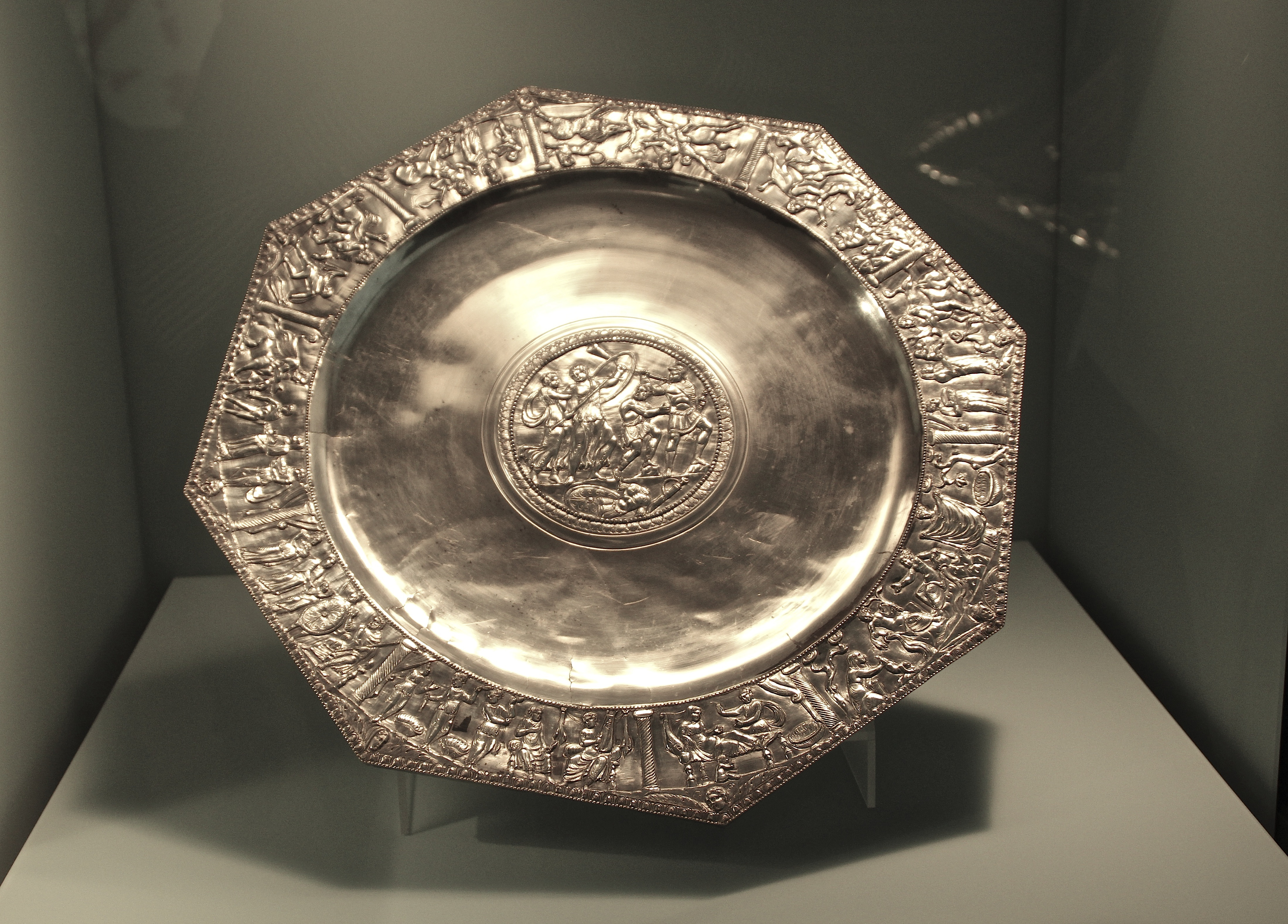
Roman egg-and-dart border of a plate from the silver treasure of Augusta Raurica, mid 4th century, silver, Augusta Raurica Museum, near Augusta Raurica, Switzerland

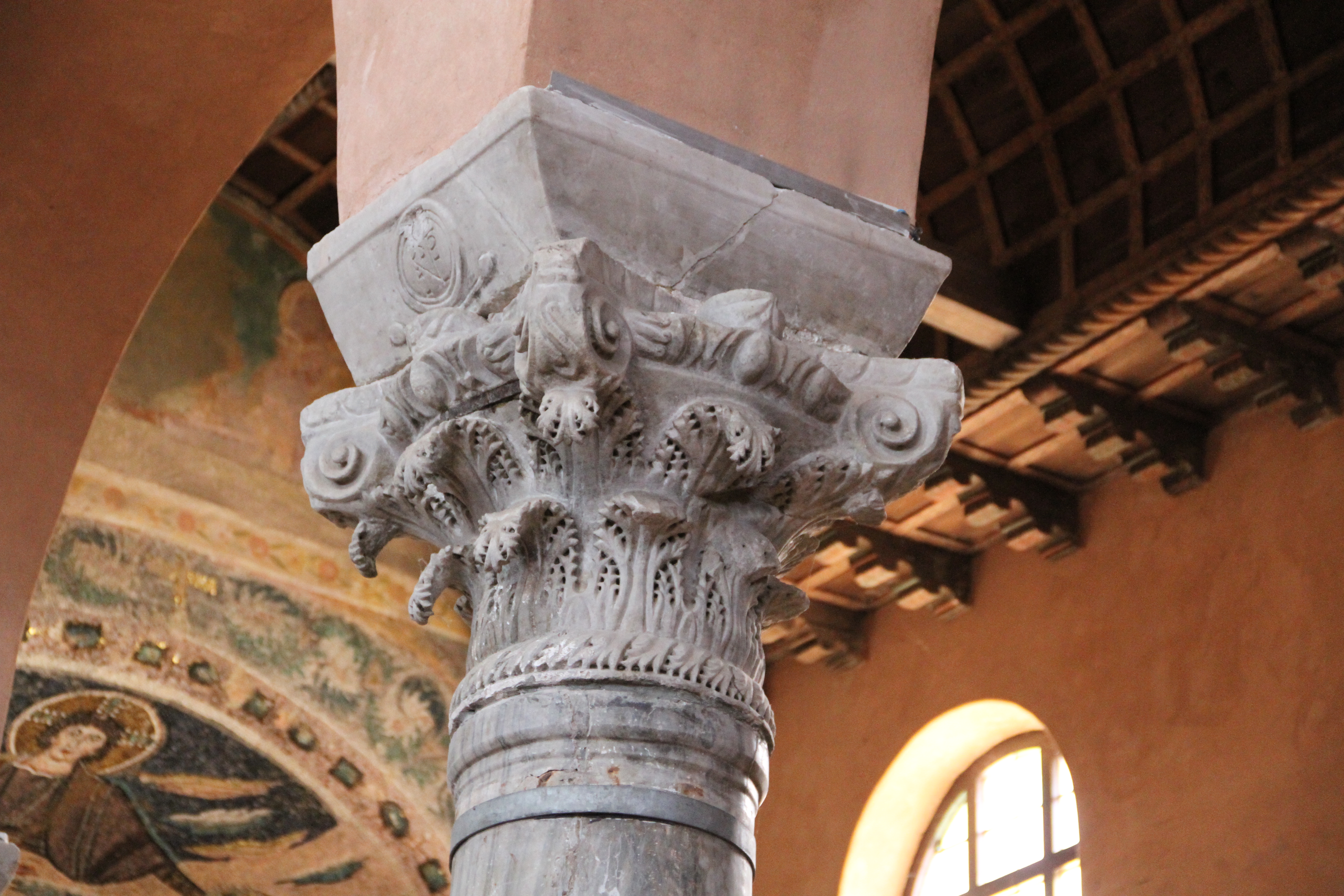
Byzantine egg-and-dart on a Composite capital in the Euphrasian Basilica, Poreč, Croatia, unknown architect, 6th century

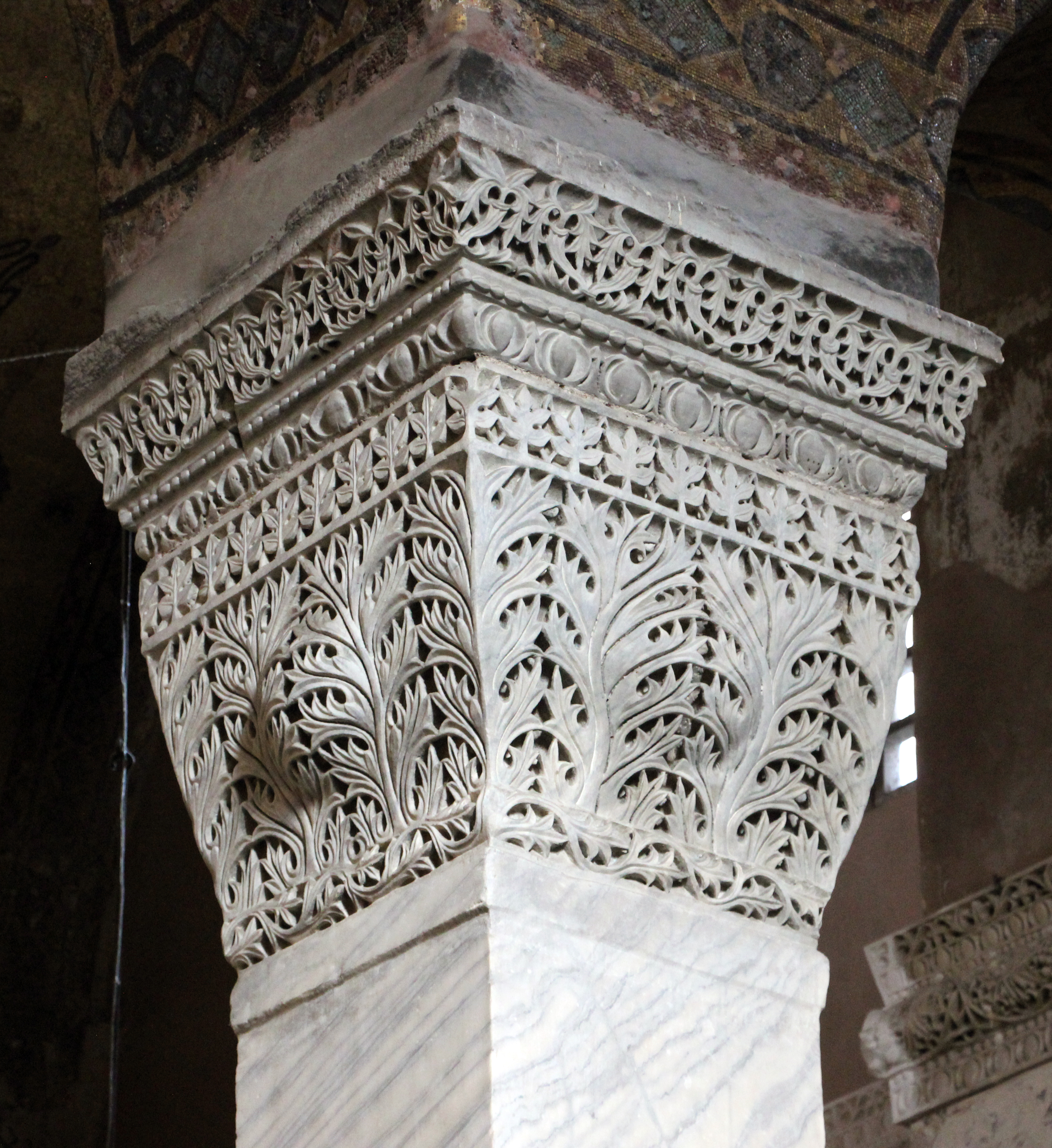
Byzantine egg-and-dart on a basket capital in the Hagia Sophia, Istanbul, Turkey, by Anthemius of Tralles or Isidore of Miletus, 6th century

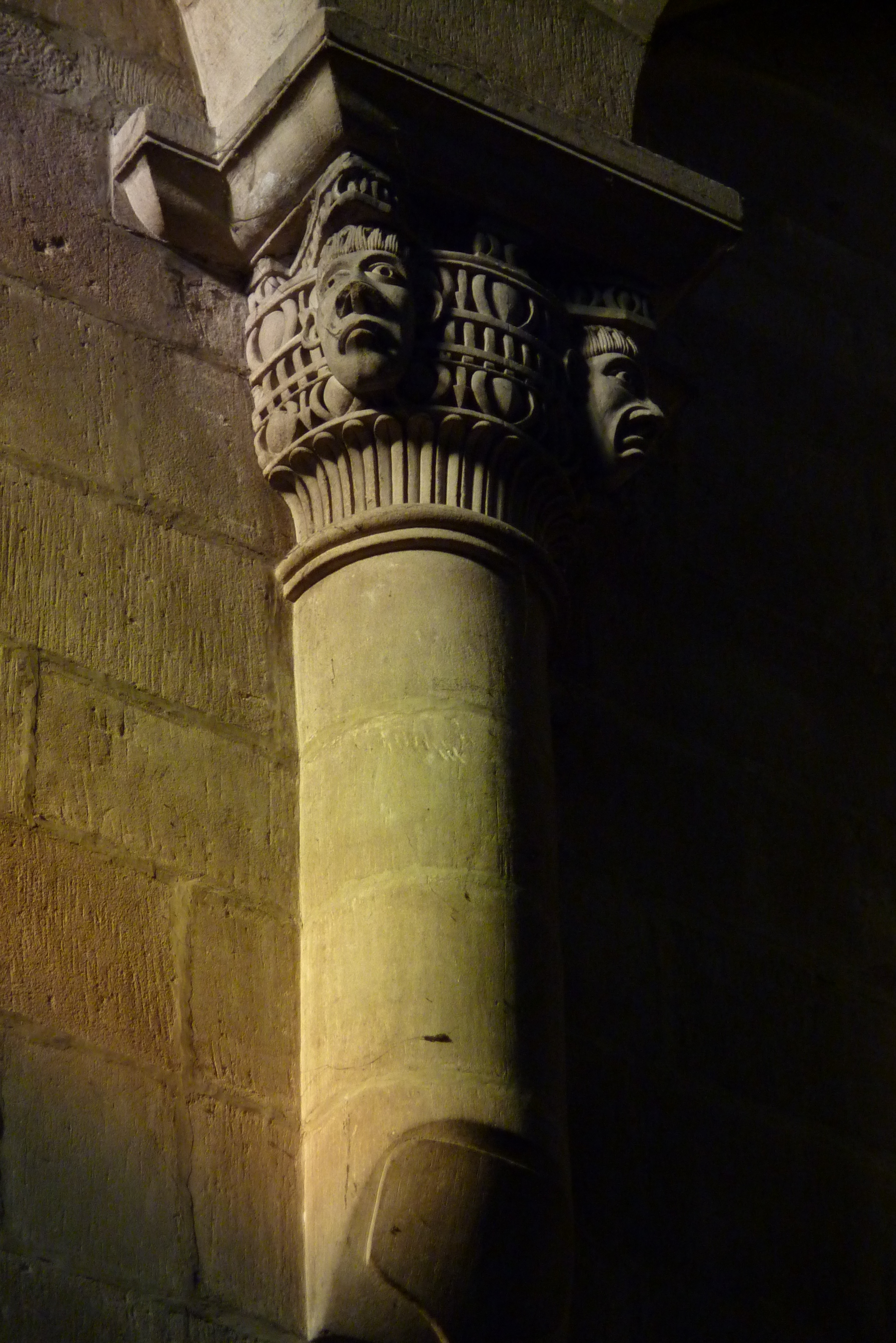
Romanesque egg-and-dart on a capital from the Collegiate Church of Saint-Barnard, Romans-sur-Isère, France, unknown architect or sculptor, 838

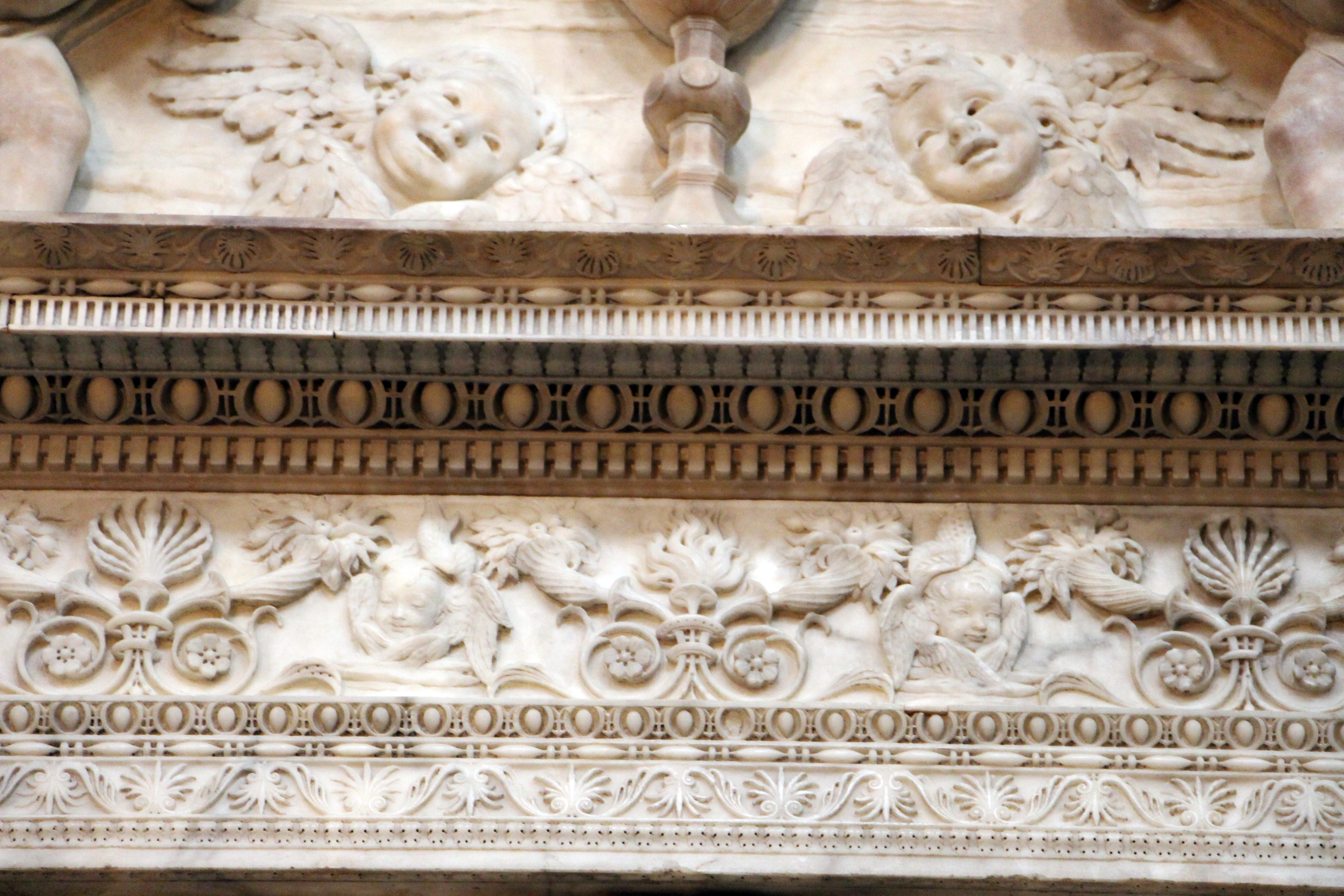
Renaissance egg-and-dart on the San Lorenzo Tabernacle, by Desiderio da Settignano and Baccio da Montelupo, 1461, marble, Basilica of San Lorenzo, Florence, Italy

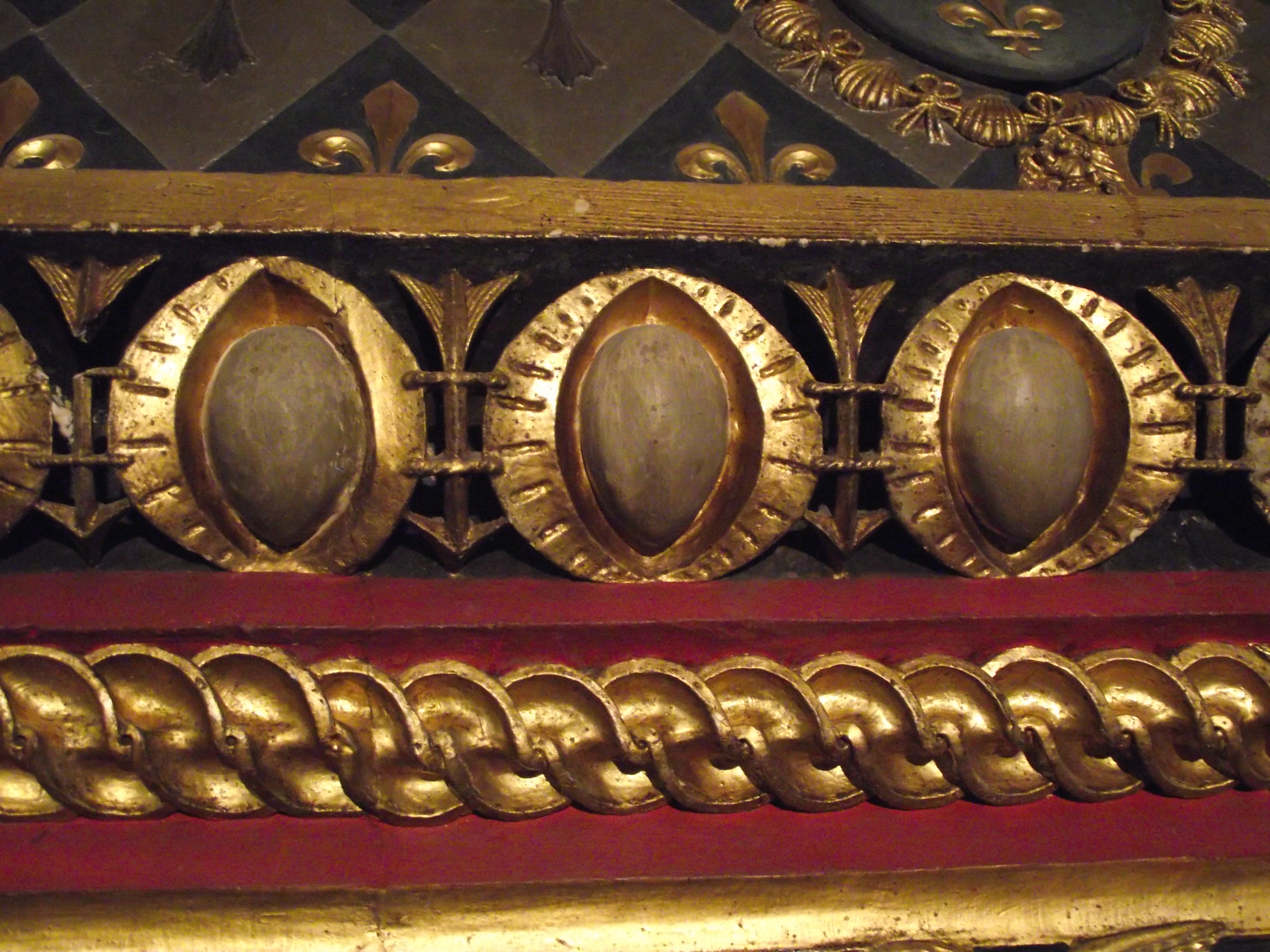
Renaissance egg-and-dart in Hôtel d'Alluye, Blois, France, unknown architect or sculptor, 1498 (or 1500)-1508

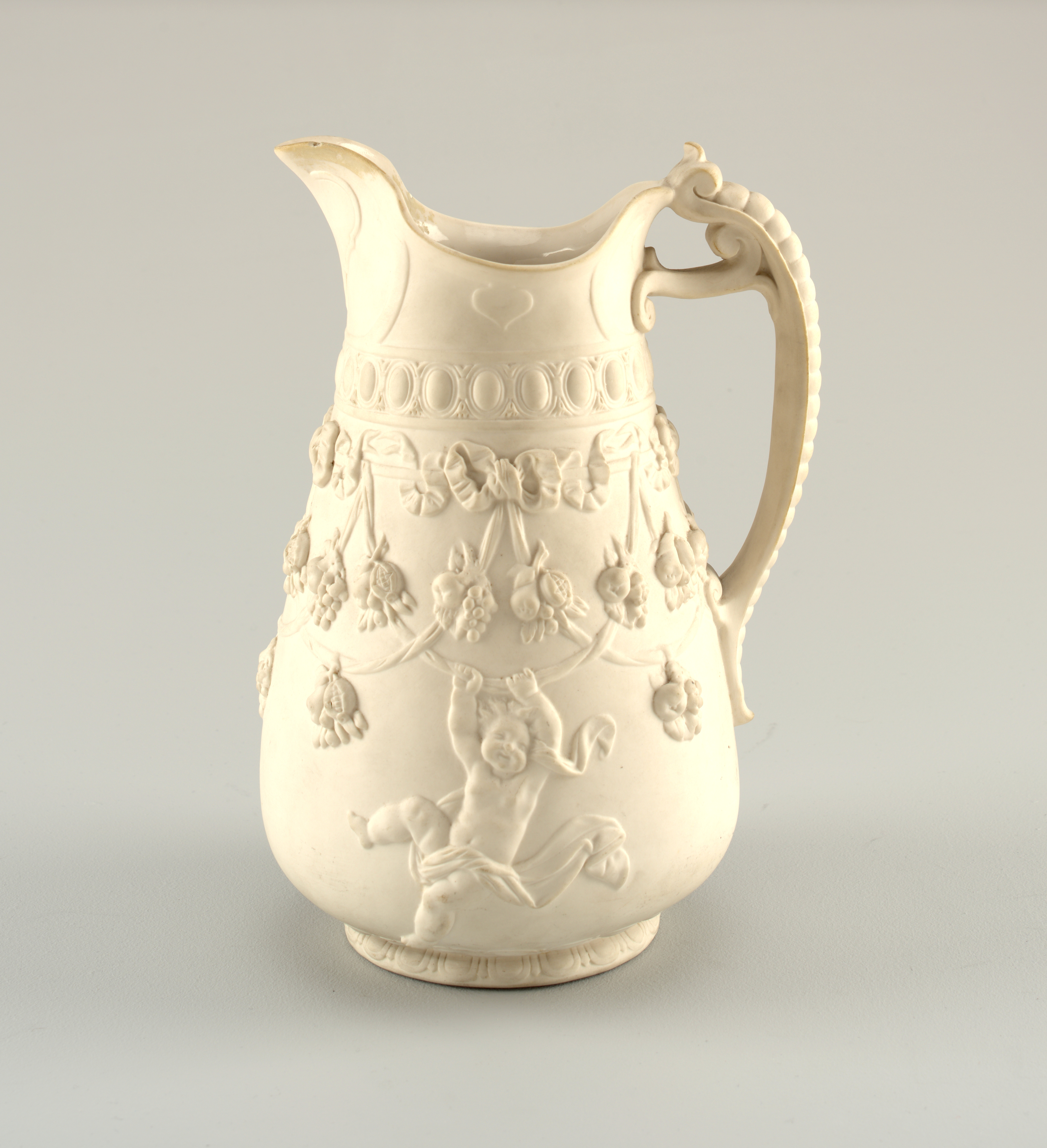
Neoclassical reinterpretation of the egg-and-dart on a jug, 1854, unglazed porcelain (Parian ware), Cooper Hewitt, Smithsonian Design Museum, New York City

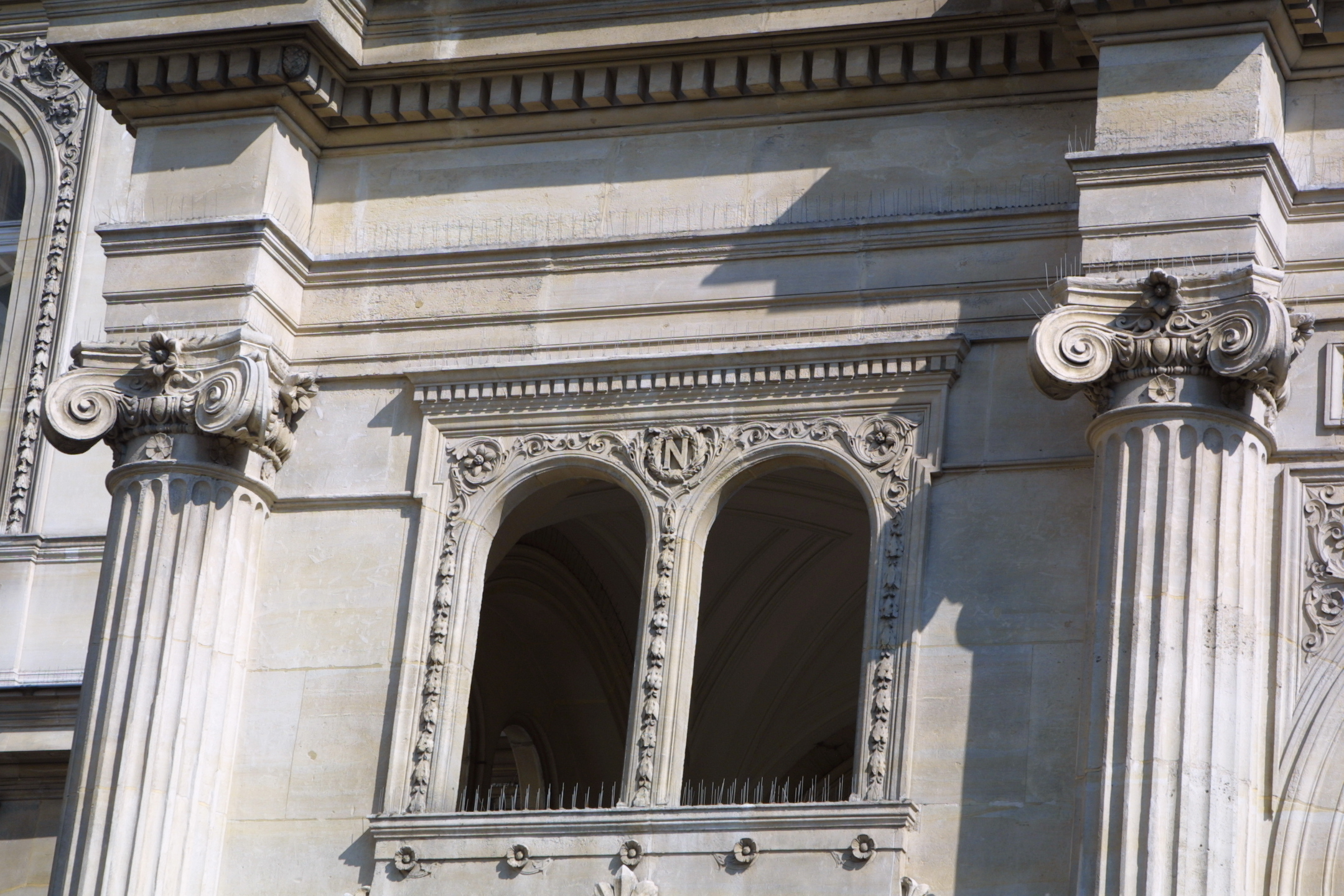
Neoclassical egg-and-dart on the Ionic capitals of the Town Hall of the 1st arrondissement of Paris, by Jacques Ignace Hittorff, 1858–1860

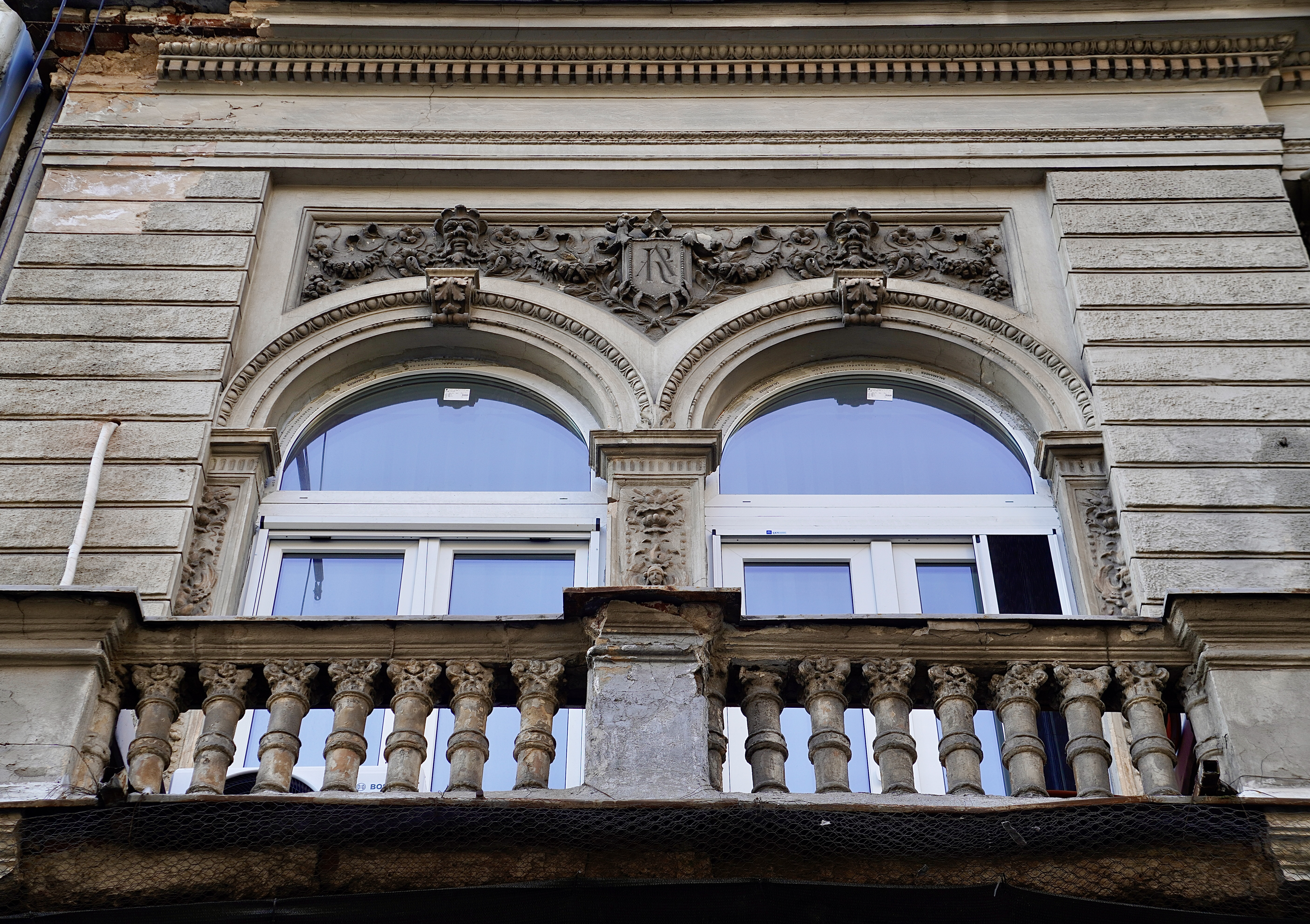
Neoclassical egg-and-dart on arches of Cinema București (Bulevardul Regina Elisabeta no. 26), Bucharest, Romania, attributed to Alexandru Orăscu, 1884

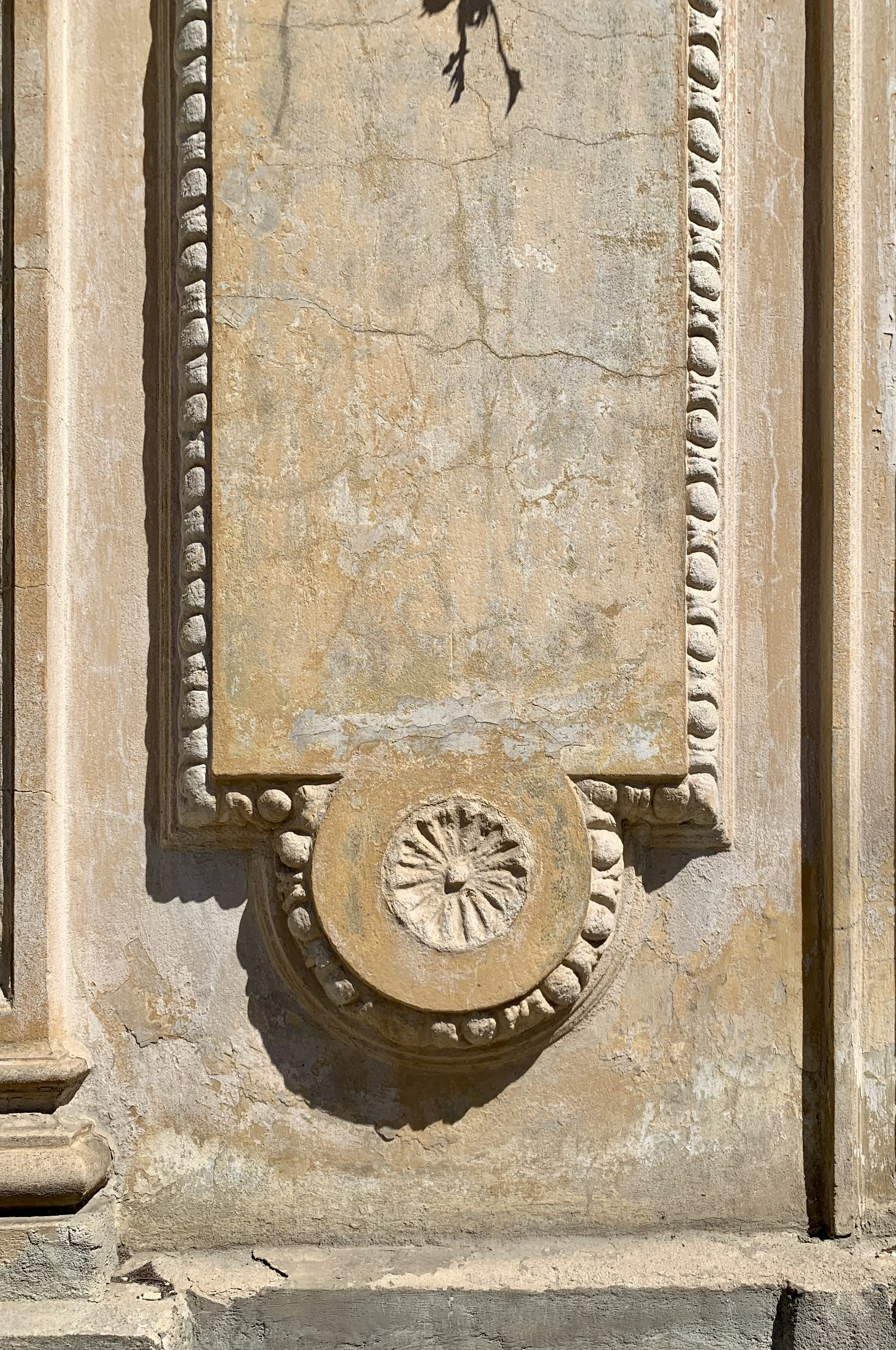
Renaissance Revival margent on a pilaster of Strada Grigore Cobălcescu no. 18, Bucharest, unknown architect, c.1890

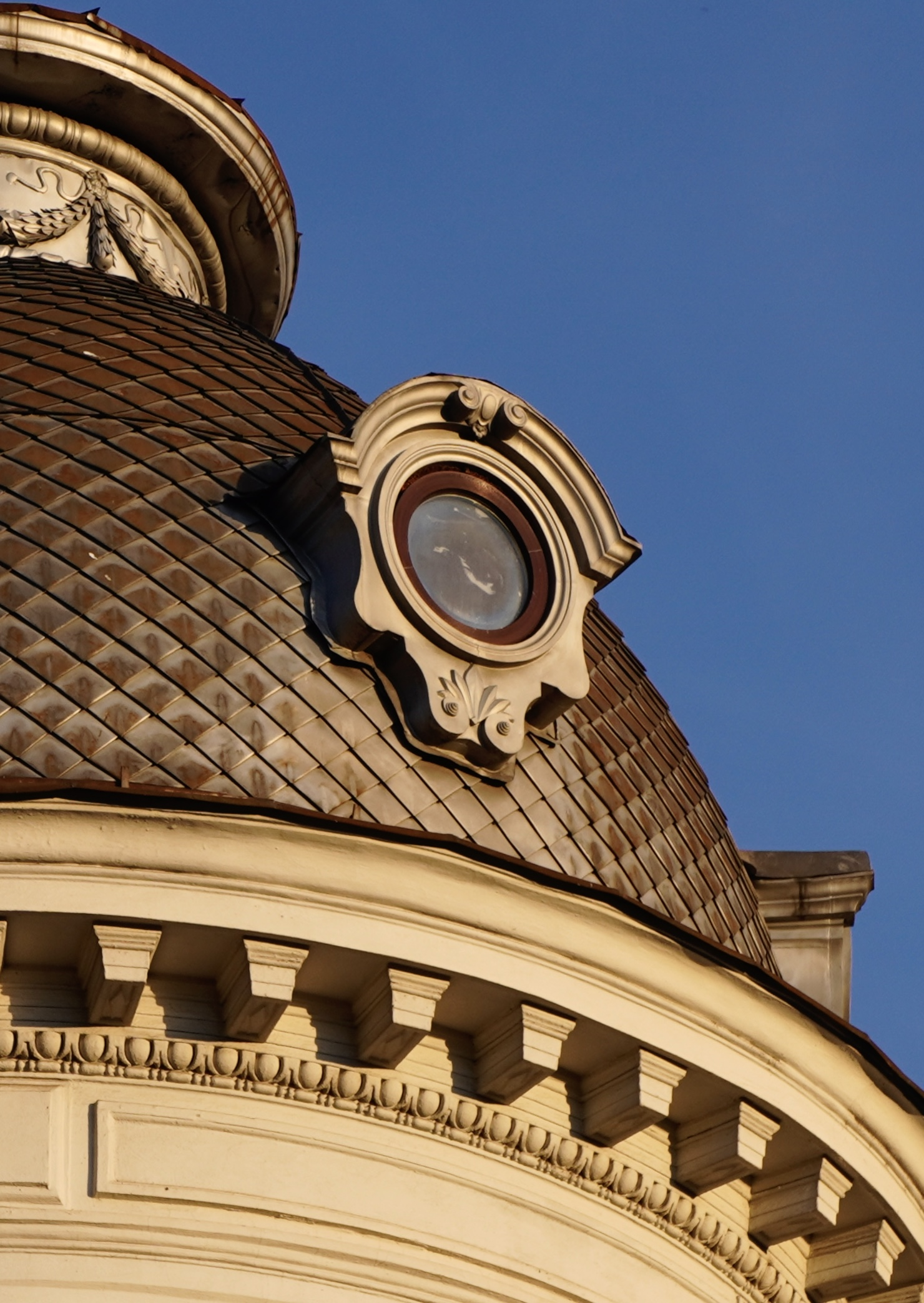
Neoclassical egg-art-dart on the cornice of Bulevardul Regina Elisabeta no. 59, Bucharest, unknown architect, c.1900

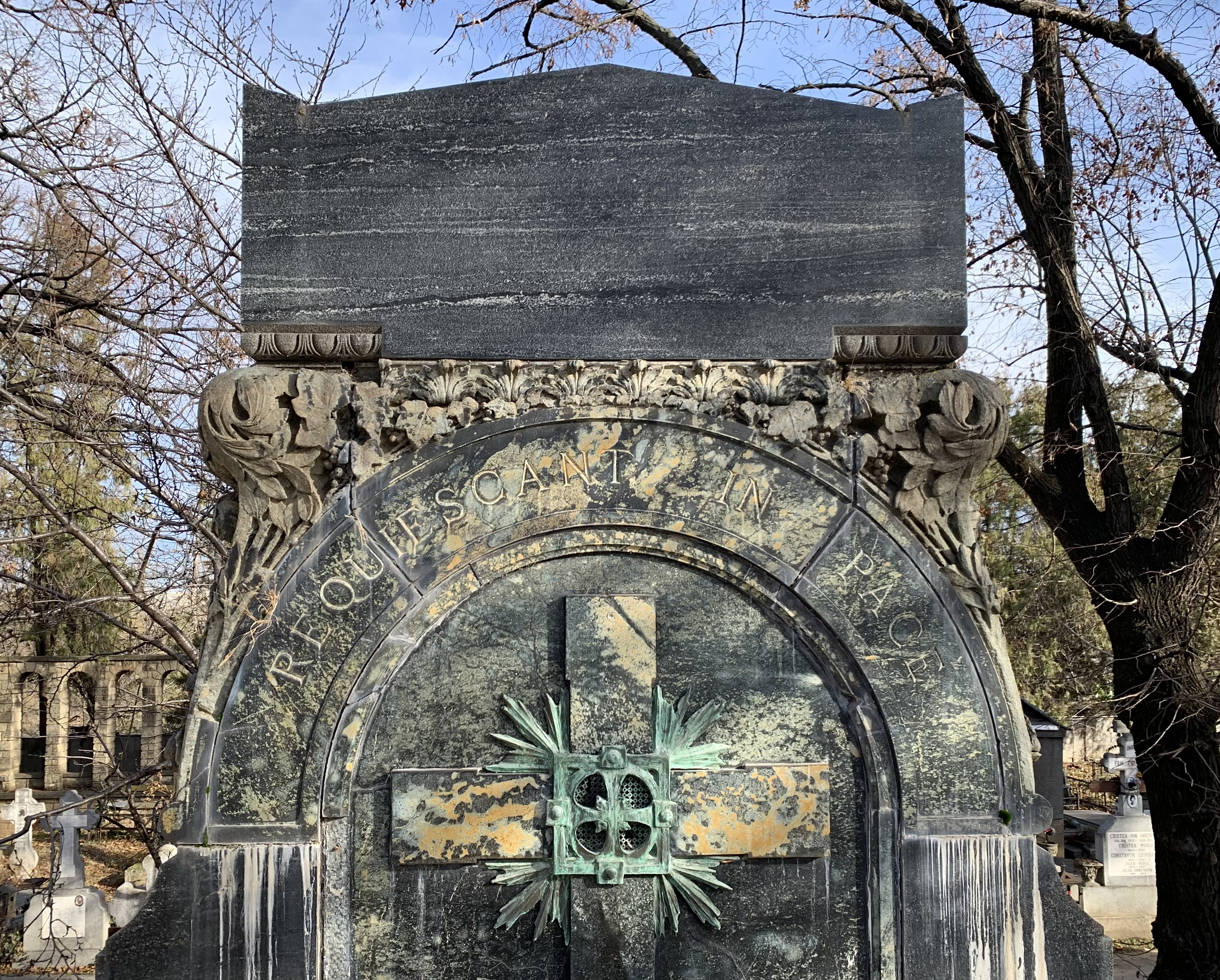
Art Nouveau egg-and-dart on the Grave of the George Assan and Petre Petrini Family in the Bellu Cemetery in Bucharest, unknown architect or sculptor, c.1900

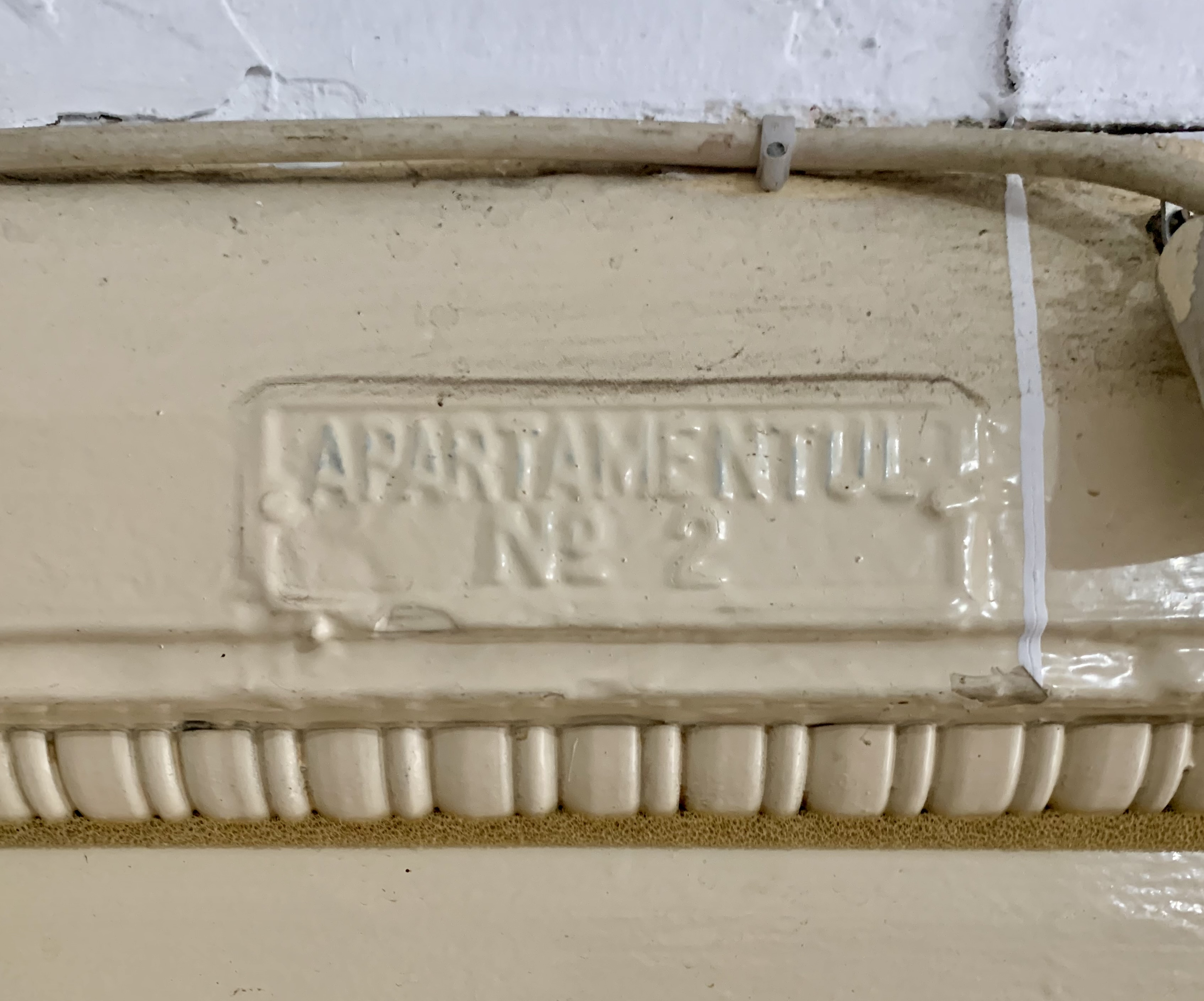
Art Deco egg-and-dart on a door inside Strada Paris no. 4, Bucharest, unknown architect or sculptor, c.1930

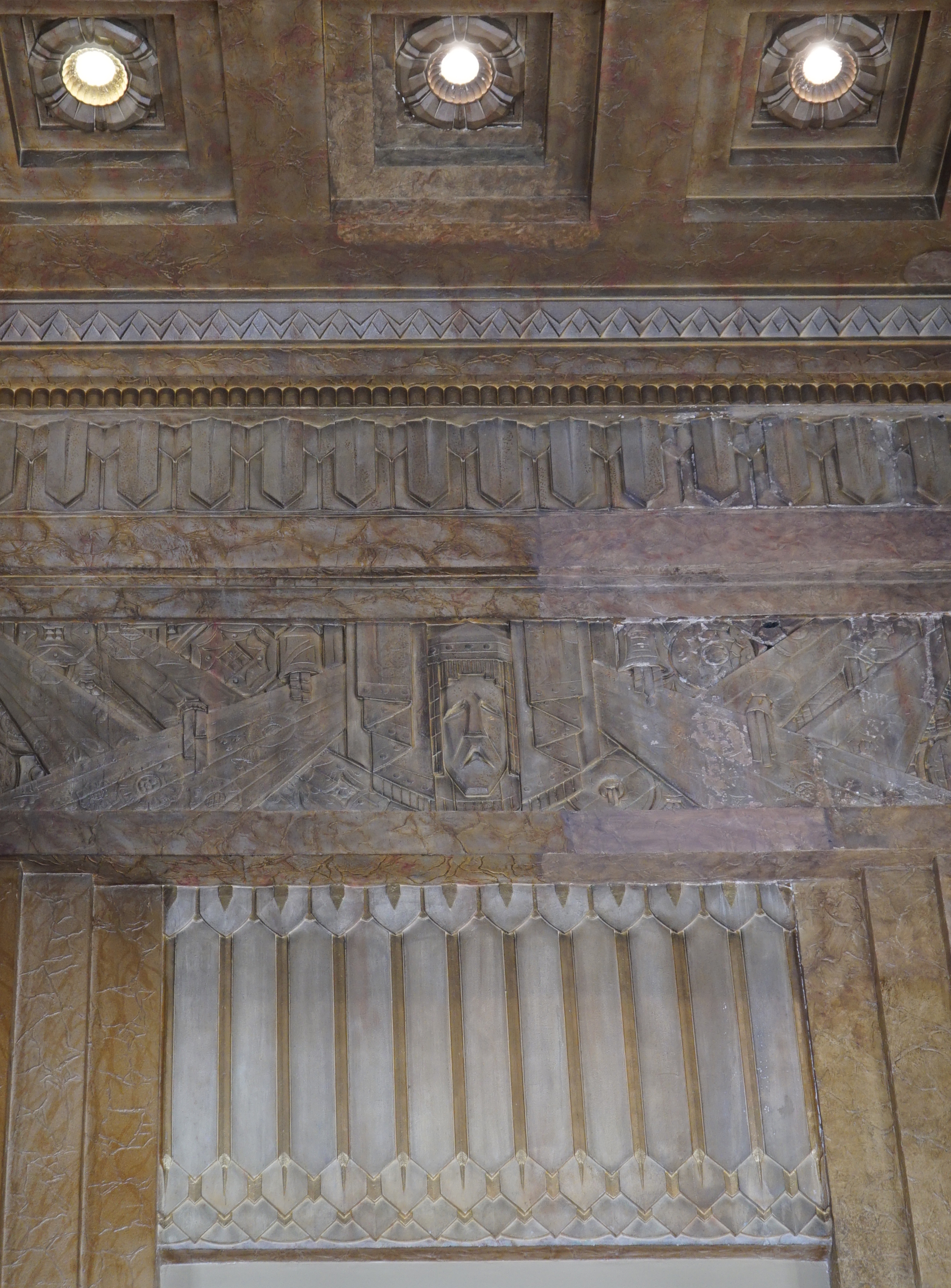
Art Deco reinterpretation of the egg-and-dart (above the mascaron and under the dentils) in the Reims Opera House, Reims, France, by François Maille and Louis Sollier, 1931–1932

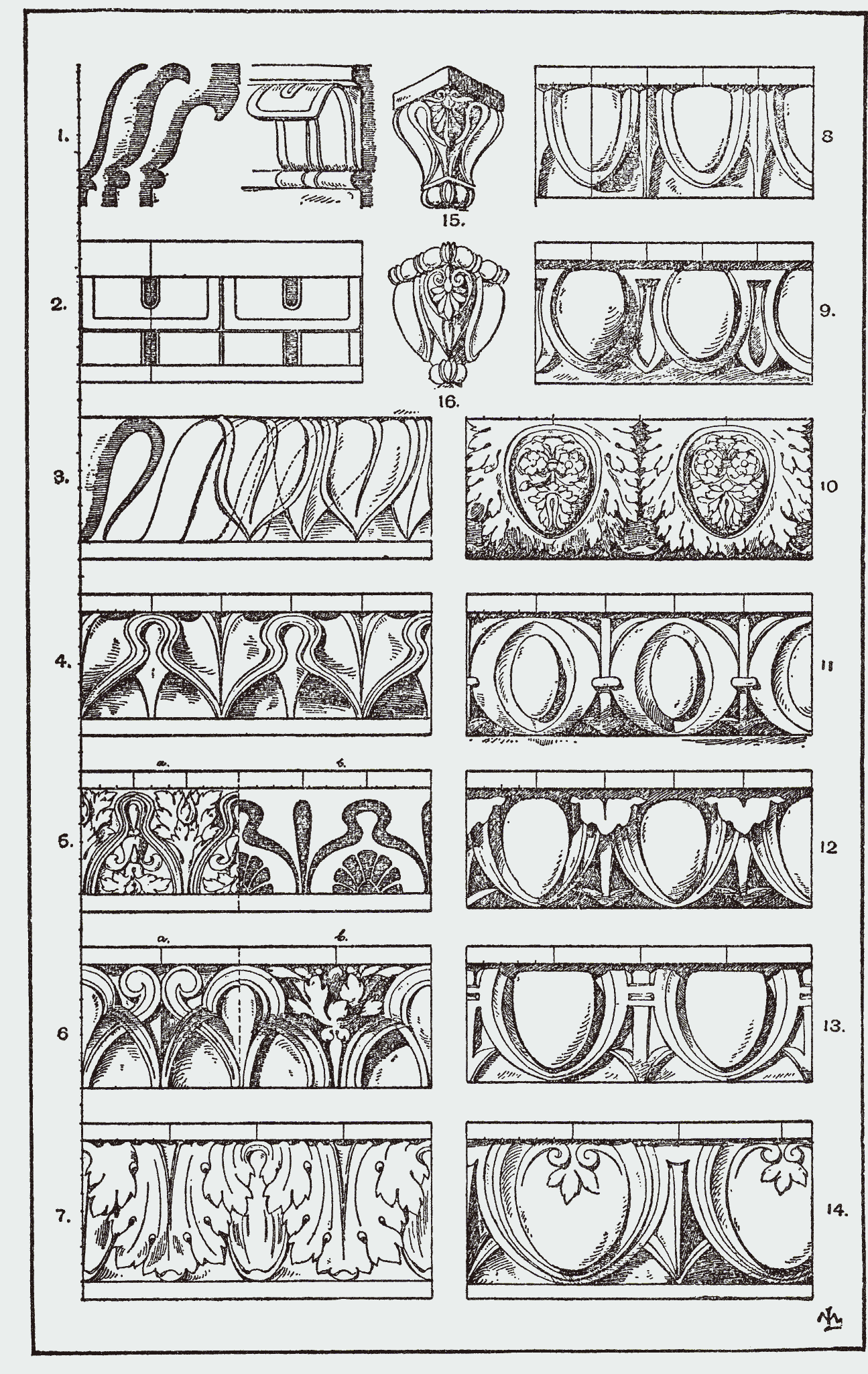
Egg-and-dart motifs (on right) from Meyer's Ornament

== See also ==
- Rais-de-cœur
- Ionic order
