= Reims Opera House =

- Opéra de Reims
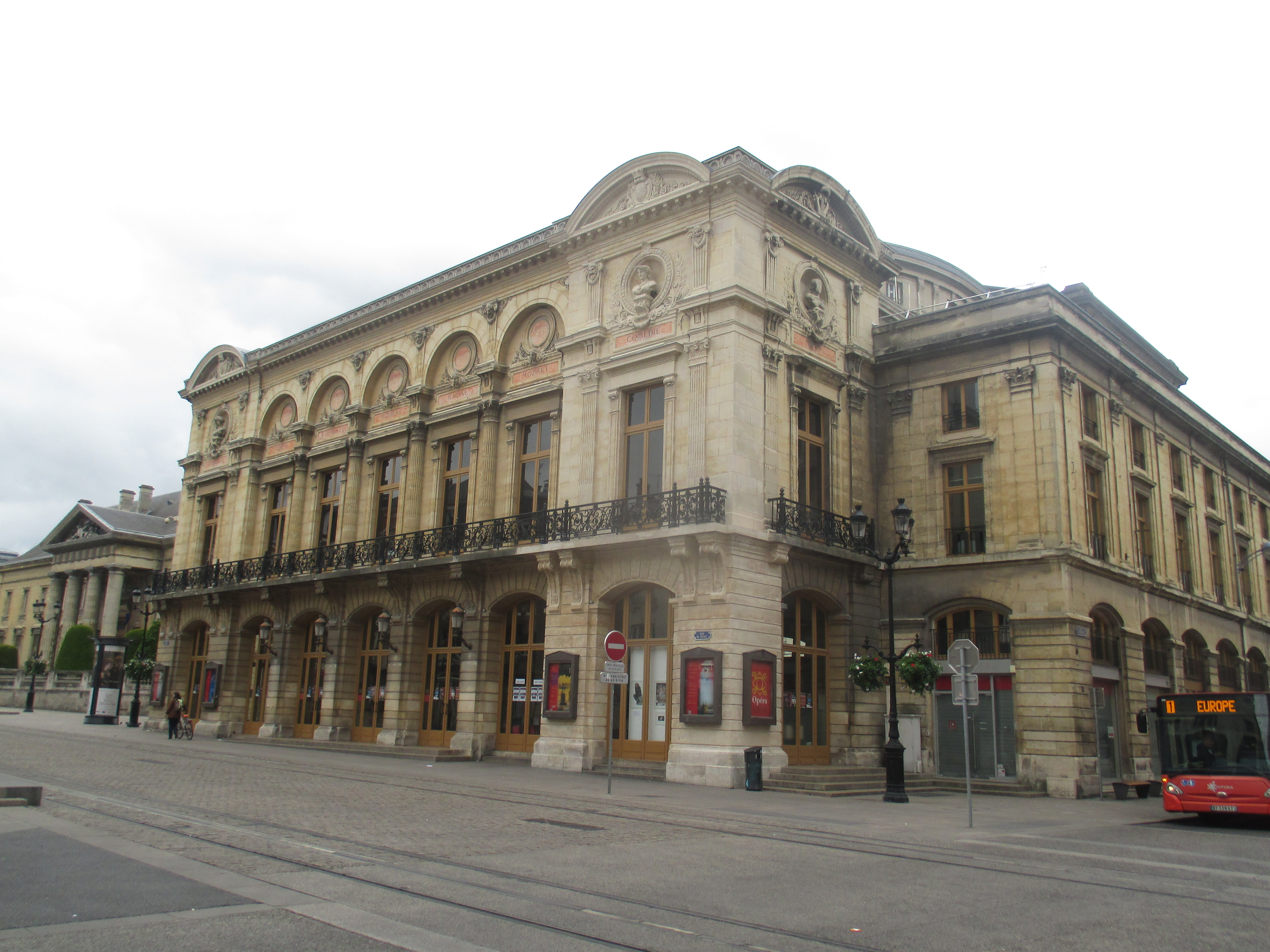
- Interactive map of Reims Opera House
- Former names: Grand Théâtre
- Location: 1 rue de Vesle 51100 Reims, France
- Coordinates: 49°15′15″N 04°01′51″E
- Capacity: 748
- Type: Opera house

Construction
- Built: 1873
- Renovated: 1931–1932

Website
- www.operadereims.com

The Reims Opera House (French: Opéra de Reims, IPA: [ɔpeʁa də ʁɛ̃s]), historically known as the Grand Théâtre ("Grand Theater"), was built in 1873 over designs by Alphonse Gosset, in Reims, France. Its architecture was "explicitly inspired by the Paris opera house, then still under construction", especially the terraced roof. "It is notable for its opulent symbolic ornamentation on the theme of music and the lyric arts." The building was burnt down during World War I and rebuilt in 1931–1932 with an interior by François Maille and Louis Sollier. The auditorium's ceiling surrounding the chandelier was painted by René Rousseau-Decelle. The chandelier, 7.5 metres (25 ft) wide, was realized by Edgar Brandt.

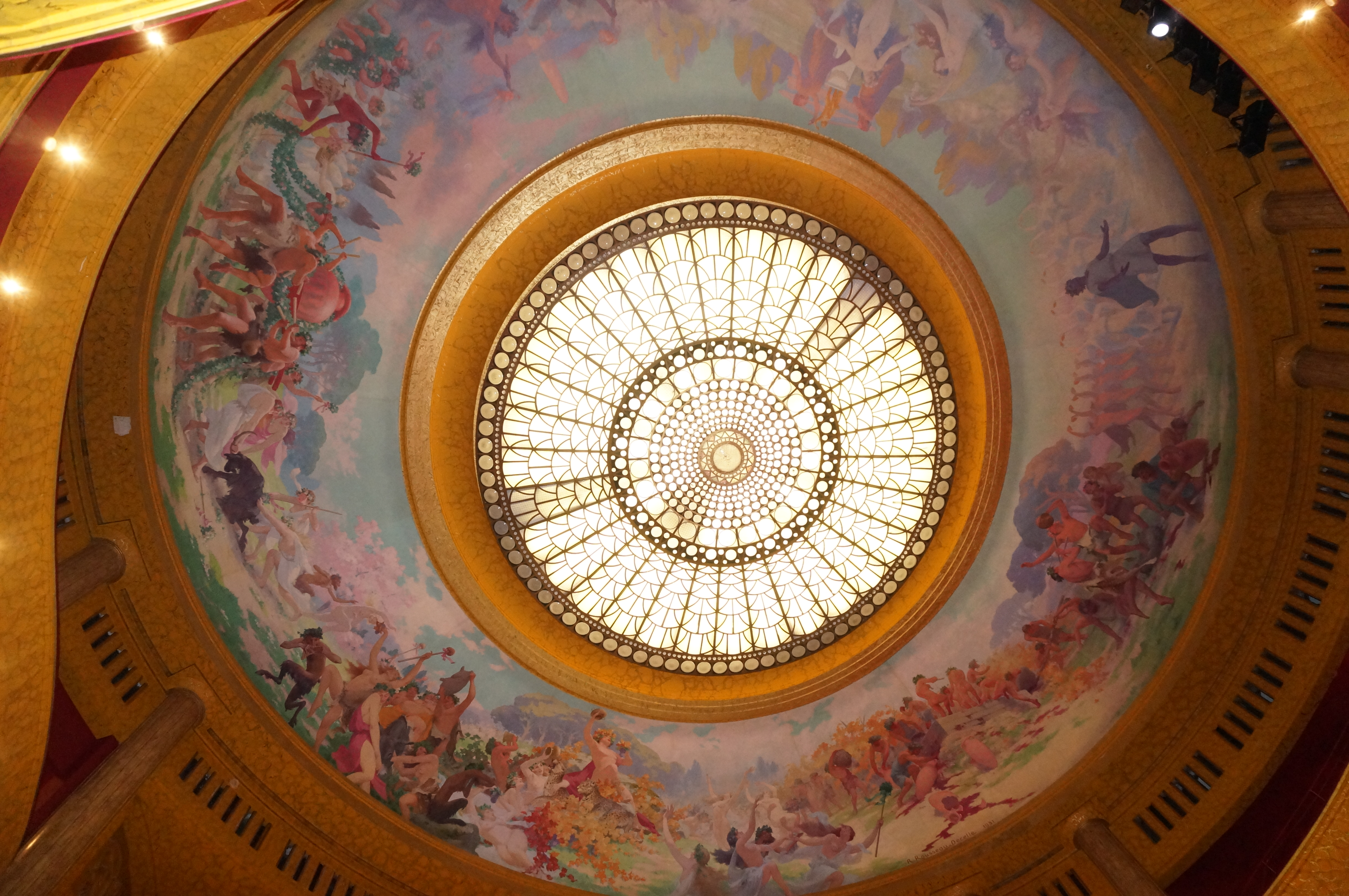
The auditorium's ceiling and chandelier
