= The Tales of Hoffmann =

Opera by Jacques Offenbach, premiered 1881

Les contes d'Hoffmann The Tales of Hoffmann
- Opéra fantastique by Jacques Offenbach
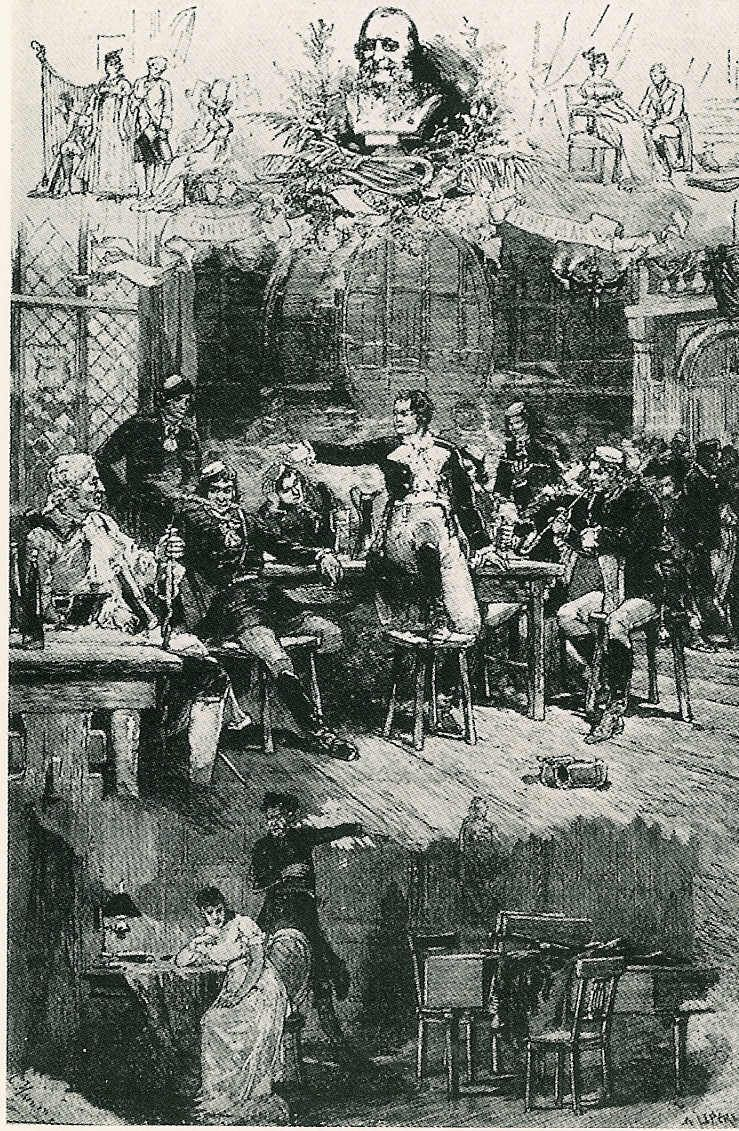
- Scenes from the Paris premiere
- Librettist: Jules Barbier
- Language: French
- Based on: three short stories by E. T. A. Hoffmann
- Premiere: 10 February 1881; Opéra-Comique, Paris

The Tales of Hoffmann (French: Les contes d'Hoffmann) is an opéra fantastique by Jacques Offenbach. The French libretto was written by Jules Barbier, based on three short stories by E. T. A. Hoffmann, who is the protagonist of the story. It was Offenbach's final work; he died in October 1880, four months before the premiere.

== Composition history and sources ==
Offenbach saw a play, Les contes fantastiques d'Hoffmann, written by Barbier and Michel Carré and produced at the Odéon Theatre in Paris in 1851.

After returning from America in 1876, Offenbach learned that Barbier had adapted the play, which Hector Salomon had now set to music at the Opéra. Salomon handed the project to Offenbach. Work proceeded slowly, interrupted by the composition of profitable lighter works. Offenbach had a premonition, like Antonia, the heroine of Act 2, that he would die prior to its completion.

Offenbach continued working on the opera throughout 1880, attending some rehearsals. On 5 October 1880, he died with the manuscript in his hand, just four months before the opening. Shortly before he died, he wrote to Léon Carvalho:

"Hâtez-vous de monter mon opéra. Il ne me reste plus longtemps à vivre et mon seul désir est d'assister à la première."
("Hurry up and stage my opera. I have not much time left, and my only wish is to attend the opening night.")

The stories in the opera include:

- "Der Sandmann" ("The Sandman"), 1816.
- "Rath Krespel" ("Councillor Krespel", also known in English as "The Cremona Violin") 1818.
- "Das verlorene Spiegelbild" ("The Lost Reflection") from Die Abenteuer der Sylvester-Nacht (The Adventures of New Year's Eve), 1814.

== Performance history ==
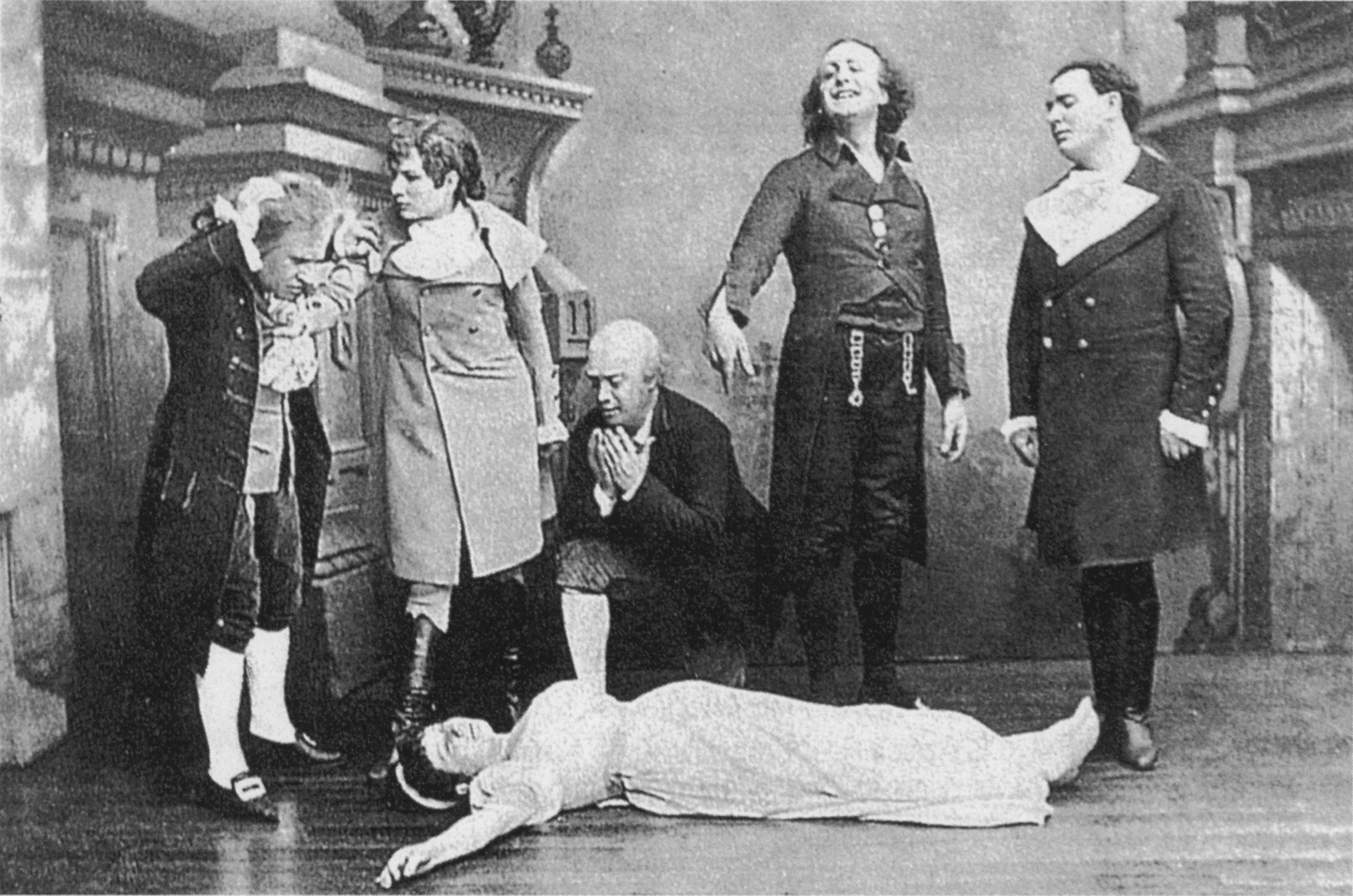
The death of Antonia (act 2) in the original 1881 production. In front: Adèle Isaac; in back (left to right): Hippolyte Belhomme, Marguerite Ugalde, Pierre Grivot, Émile-Alexandre Taskin, Jean-Alexandre Talazac.

The opera was first performed in a public venue at the Opéra-Comique on 10 February 1881, without the third (Venice) act. It was presented in an abridged form at Offenbach's house, 8 Boulevard des Capucines, on 18 May 1879, with Madame Franck-Duvernoy in the soprano roles, Auguez as Hoffmann (baritone) and Émile-Alexandre Taskin in the four villain roles, with Edmond Duvernoy at the piano and a chorus directed by Albert Vizentini. Besides Léon Carvalho, director of the Opéra-Comique, the director of the Ringtheater in Vienna, Franz von Jauner, was also present. Both men requested the rights, but Offenbach granted them to Carvalho.

A four-act version with recitatives was staged at the Ringtheater on 7 December 1881, conducted by Joseph Hellmesberger Jr., although a gas explosion and fire occurred at the theatre after the second performance.

The opera reached its hundredth performance at the Salle Favart on 15 December 1881. The fire at the Opéra-Comique in 1887 destroyed the orchestral parts, and it was not seen again in Paris until 1893, at the Salle de la Renaissance du Théâtre-Lyrique, when it received 20 performances. A new production by Albert Carré (including the Venice act) was mounted at the Opéra-Comique in 1911, with Léon Beyle in the title role and Albert Wolff conducting. This production remained in the repertoire until World War II, receiving 700 performances. Following a recording by Opéra-Comique forces in March 1948, Louis Musy created the first post-war production in Paris, conducted by André Cluytens. The Paris Opera first staged the work in October 1974, directed by Patrice Chéreau with Nicolai Gedda in the title role.

Outside France, the piece was performed in Geneva, Budapest, Hamburg, New York, and Mexico in 1882, Vienna (Theater an der Wien), Prague, and Antwerp in 1883, and Lvov and Berlin in 1884. Local premieres included Buenos Aires in 1894, St Petersburg in 1899, Barcelona in 1905, and London in 1910.

== Roles ==
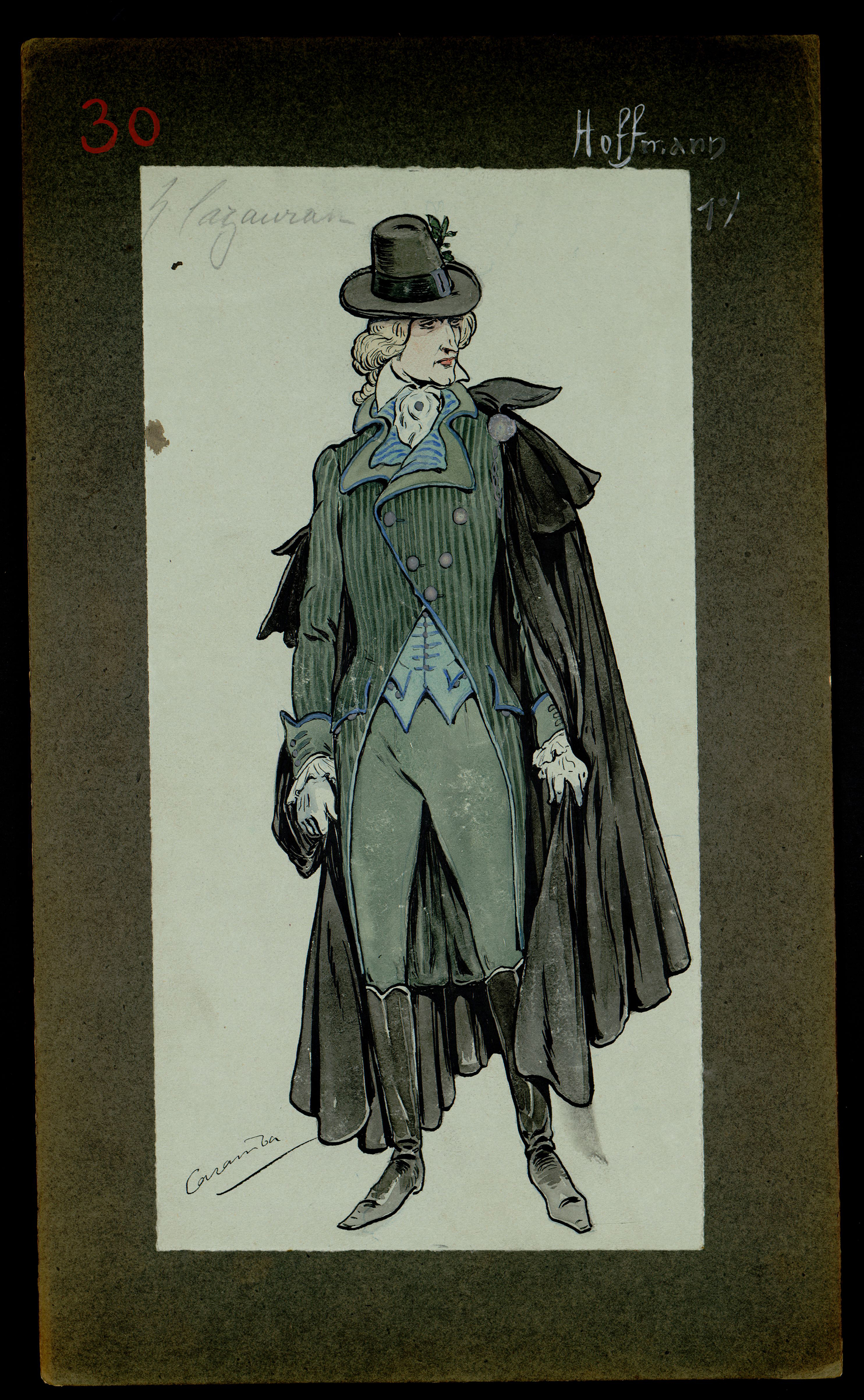
Costume design for Hoffmann in act 1, 1903

Role	Voice type	Premiere cast, 10 February 1881 (Conductor: Jules Danbé)
Hoffmann, a poet	tenor	Jean-Alexandre Talazac
The muse	mezzo-soprano	Zoé Molé-Truffier
Nicklausse	mezzo-soprano	Marguerite Ugalde
Lindorf	bass-baritone	Émile-Alexandre Taskin
Coppélius	bass-baritone	Émile-Alexandre Taskin
Miracle	bass-baritone	Émile-Alexandre Taskin
Dapertutto	bass-baritone	
Andrès	tenor	Pierre Grivot
Cochenille	tenor	Pierre Grivot
Frantz	tenor	Pierre Grivot
Pittichinaccio	tenor	
Stella, a singer	soprano	Adèle Isaac
Olympia, a mechanical or an animatronical doll	soprano	Adèle Isaac
Antonia, a young girl	soprano	Adèle Isaac
Giulietta, a courtesan	soprano	
Voice of Antonia's mother	mezzo-soprano	Dupuis
Luther	baritone	Étienne Troy
Spalanzani, an inventor	tenor	E. Gourdon
Crespel, Antonia's father	baritone	Hippolyte Belhomme
Peter Schlémil, in love with Giulietta	baritone	
Nathanaël, a student	tenor	Chenevières
Hermann, a student	baritone	Teste
Wilhelm, a student	bass-baritone	Collin
Wolfram, a student	tenor	Piccaluga
Students, Guests

== Synopsis ==
=== Prologue ===
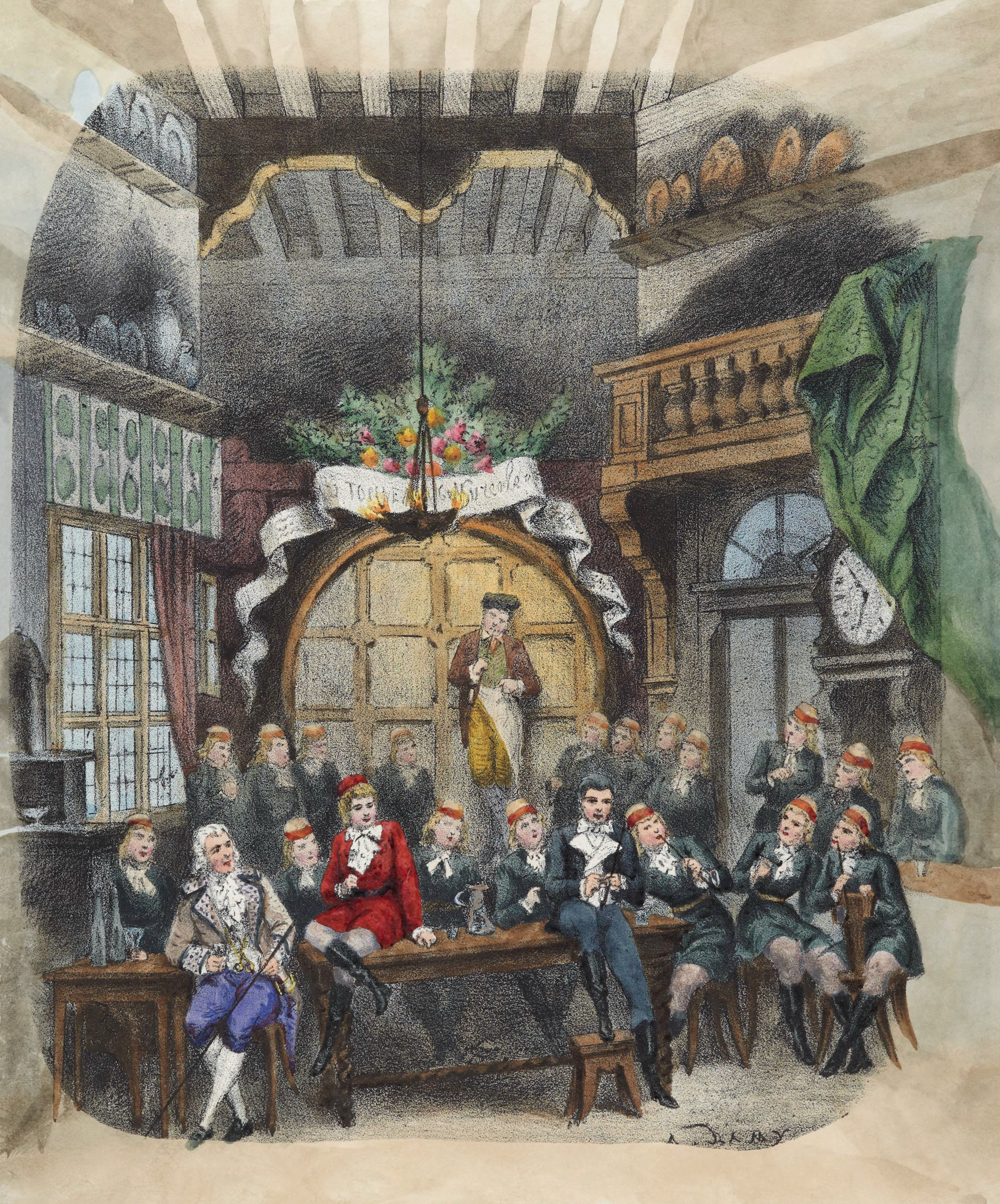
Prologue (or epilogue), in the 1881 première

A tavern in Nuremberg: The Muse appears and reveals to the audience her purpose is to draw Hoffmann's attention and make him abjure all his other loves, so he can be devoted only to her: poetry. She takes the appearance of Hoffmann's closest friend, Nicklausse. The prima donna Stella, performing Mozart's Don Giovanni, sends a letter to Hoffmann, requesting a meeting in her dressing room after the performance. The letter and the key to the room are intercepted by Councillor Lindorf ("Dans les rôles d'amoureux langoureux" – In the languid lovers' roles), the first of the opera's incarnations of evil, Hoffmann's Nemesis. Lindorf intends to replace Hoffmann at the rendezvous. In the tavern, students wait for Hoffmann. He finally arrives, and entertains them with the legend of Kleinzach, the dwarf ("Il était une fois à la cour d'Eisenach", “Once upon a time at the court of Eisenach”). Lindorf coaxes Hoffmann into telling the audience about his three great loves.

=== Act 1 (Olympia) ===
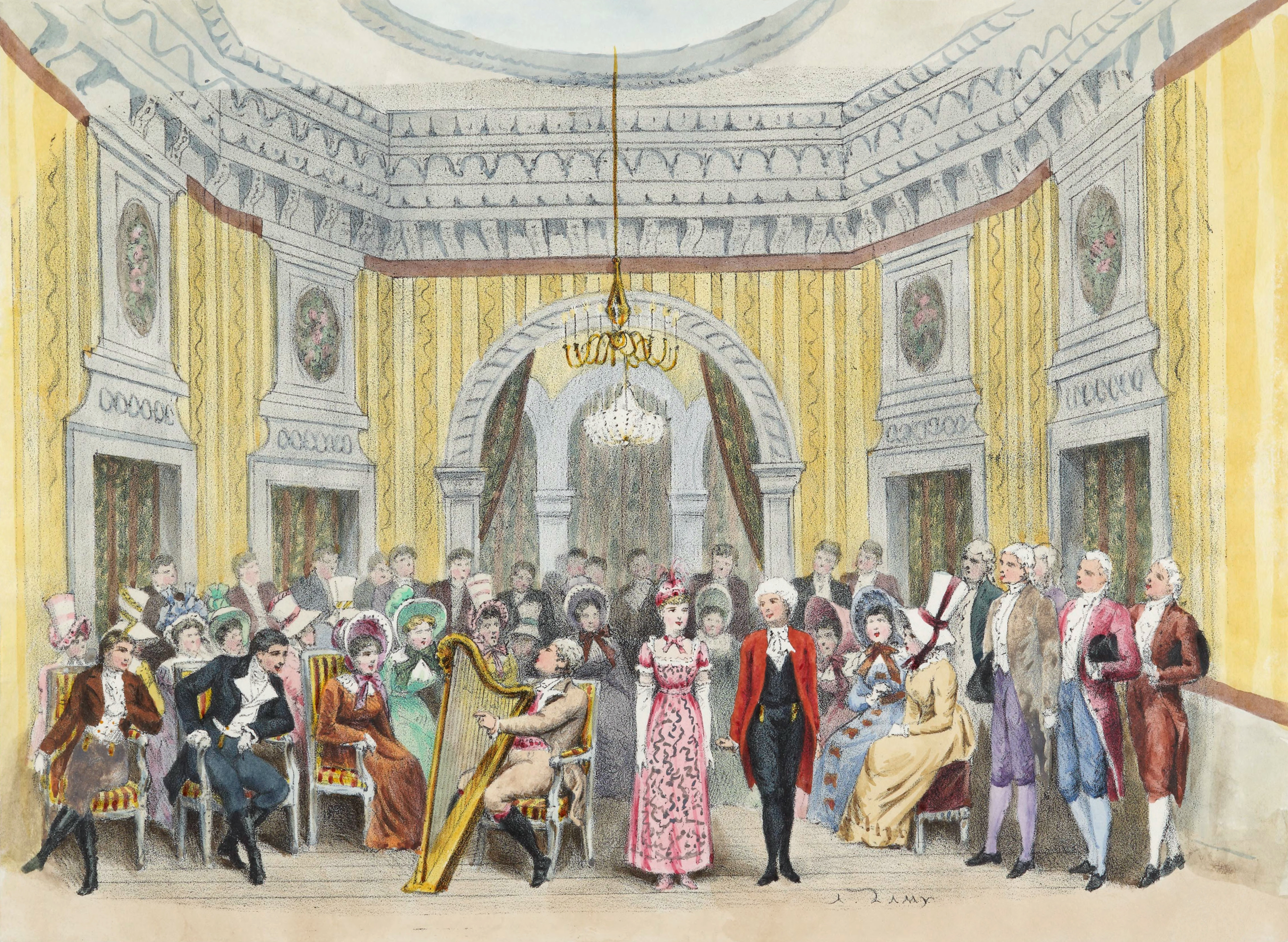
The Olympia act, as staged at the 1881 première

This act is based on a portion of "Der Sandmann".

Parlor of a scientist in Paris: Hoffmann's first love is Olympia, an automaton created by the scientist Spalanzani. Hoffmann has fallen in love with her, not realizing that she is a mechanical doll ("Allons! Courage et confiance...Ah! vivre deux!", “Come on! Courage and trust... Ah! to live together!”). To warn Hoffmann, Nicklausse, possessing the truth about Olympia, sings a story of a mechanical doll with a human appearance, but Hoffmann ignores him ("Une poupée aux yeux d'émail", “A doll with enamel eyes”). Coppélius, Olympia's co-creator and the act's incarnation of Nemesis, sells Hoffmann magic glasses to make Olympia appear as a real woman ("J'ai des yeux", “I have eyes”).

Olympia sings one of the opera's most famous arias, "Les oiseaux dans la charmille" (”The birds in the bower”; often referred to as "The Doll Song"), during which she winds down and needs to be wound up by Spalanzani before she can continue singing. Hoffmann is tricked into believing his affections are returned, to the bemusement of Nicklausse, who subtly attempts to warn his friend ("Voyez-la sous son éventail", “See her under her fan”). While dancing with Olympia, Hoffmann falls to the ground, breaking his magic glasses. At the same time, Coppélius bursts in, tearing Olympia apart in revenge against Spalanzani who had cheated him of his fees. With the crowd ridiculing him, Hoffmann realizes he had loved an automaton.

=== Act 2 (Antonia) ===
Antonia and Dr. Miracle, 1881

This act is based on "Rath Krespel".

Crespel's house in Munich: After a long search, Hoffmann finds the house where Crespel and his daughter Antonia are hiding. Hoffmann and Antonia loved each other, but were separated after Crespel decided to hide his daughter from Hoffmann. Antonia inherited her mother's talent for singing, but her father forbids her to sing because of her mysterious illness. Antonia wishes her lover would return to her ("Elle a fui, la tourterelle", "She fled, the dove"). Her father also forbids her to see Hoffmann, who encourages Antonia in her musical career, and therefore endangers her without knowing it. Crespel tells Frantz, his servant, to stay with his daughter, and after Crespel leaves, Frantz sings a comical song about his talents ("Jour et nuit je me mets en quatre", "Day and night, I quarter my mind”).

After Crespel leaves his house, Hoffmann takes advantage of the occasion to sneak in, and the lovers are reunited (a love duet: "C'est une chanson d'amour", "It's a love song"). After Crespel returns, he receives a visit from Dr. Miracle, the act's Nemesis, forcing Crespel to let him heal her. Eavesdropping, Hoffmann learns Antonia may die if she sings too much. He returns to her boudoir and makes her promise to give up her artistic dreams. Antonia reluctantly accepts her lover's will. After she is alone, Dr. Miracle enters Antonia's boudoir to persuade her to sing and follow her mother's path to glory, stating Hoffmann is sacrificing her to his brutishness, and loves her only for her beauty. With mystic powers, he raises a vision of Antonia's dead mother and induces Antonia to sing, causing her death. Crespel arrives just in time to witness his daughter's last breath. Hoffmann enters, and Crespel wants to kill him, thinking he is responsible for his daughter's death. Nicklausse saves his friend from the old man's vengeance.

=== Act 3 (Giulietta) ===
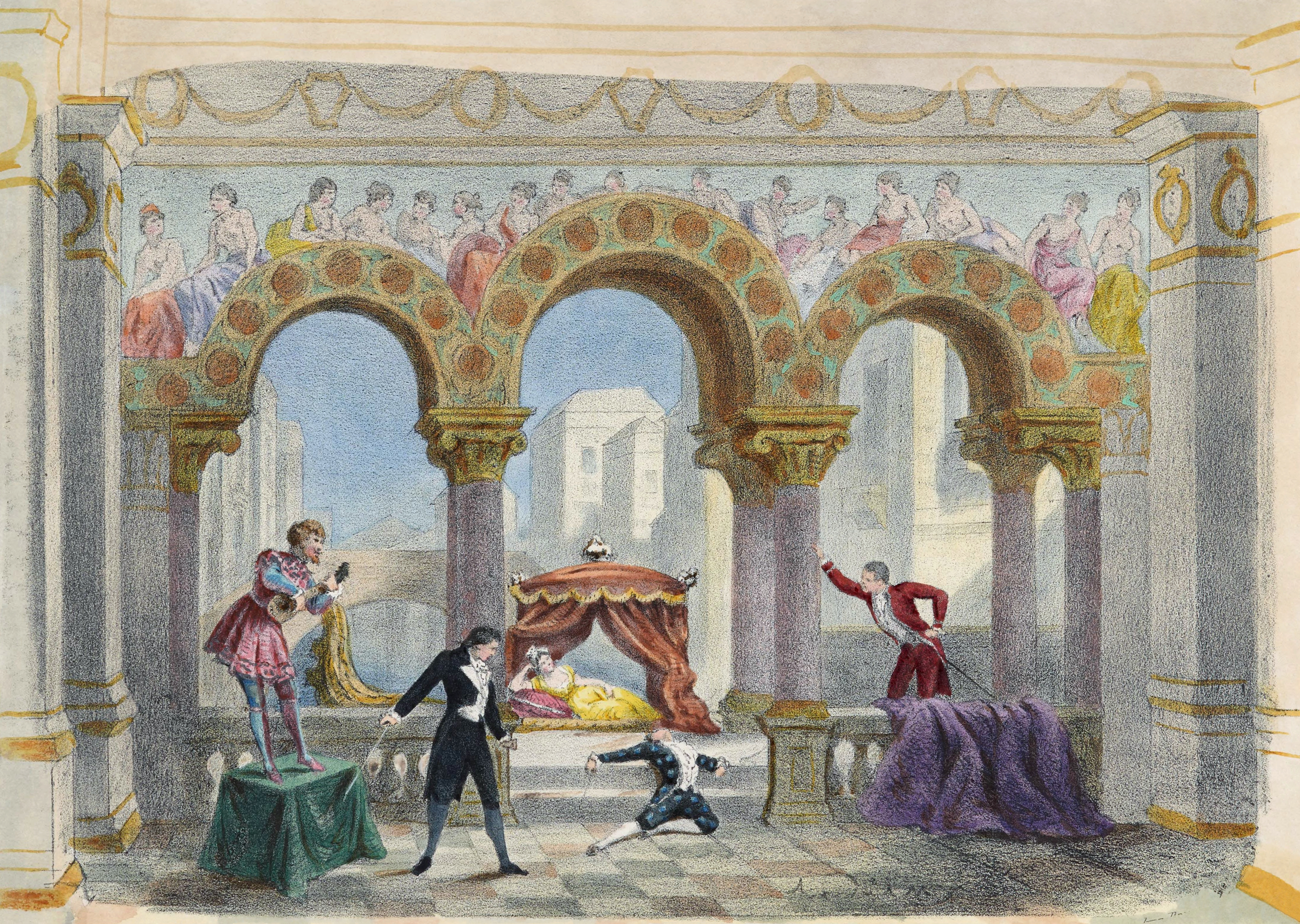
Giulietta act, 1881

This act is loosely based on Die Abenteuer der Silvester-Nacht (A New Year's Eve Adventure).

A gallery in a Venetian palace: The act opens with the barcarolle "Belle nuit, ô nuit d'amour" ("Beautiful night, oh night of love"). Hoffmann falls in love with the courtesan Giulietta and thinks she returns his affections ("Amis, l'amour tendre et rêveur", "Friends, tender and dreamy love"). Giulietta is not in love with Hoffmann, but seducing him under the orders of Captain Dapertutto, who promises her a diamond if she steals Hoffmann's reflection from a mirror ("Scintille, diamant", "Sparkle, diamond"). The jealous Schlemil (see Peter Schlemihl for a literary antecedent), a previous victim of Giulietta and Dapertutto (he gave Giulietta his shadow), challenges the poet to a duel but is killed thanks to the magic sword Hoffmann was given by Dapertutto. Nicklausse wants to take Hoffmann away from Venice and looks for horses. Meanwhile, Hoffmann meets Giulietta and cannot resist her ("O Dieu! de quelle ivresse", "O God! of what intoxication"): he gives her his reflection, only to be abandoned by the courtesan, to Dapertutto's great pleasure.

In the original version, Hoffmann, furious at being betrayed, tries to stab Giulietta but — blinded by Dapertutto — mistakenly kills his dwarf, Pittichinaccio. In Richard Bonynge's version, crafted from the Choudens edition after the original play, Giulietta is poisoned and dies by accidentally drinking the philter Dapertutto prepared for Nicklausse.

=== Epilogue ===
The tavern in Nuremberg: Hoffmann, drunk, swears he will never love again, and explains that Olympia, Antonia, and Giulietta are three facets of the same person, Stella. They represent the young girl's, the musician's, and the courtesan's side of the prima donna, respectively. After Hoffmann says he does not want to love any more, Nicklausse reveals she is the Muse and reclaims Hoffmann: "Be reborn a poet! I love you, Hoffmann! Be mine" ("Renaîtra un poète! Je t'aime, Hoffmann! Sois à moi!"). The magical poetry reaches Hoffmann and he sings "O Dieu! de quelle ivresse ("O God! of what intoxication") once more, ending with "Muse, whom I love, I am yours" ("Muse que j'aime, je suis à toi!"). At this moment, Stella, tired of waiting for Hoffmann to come to her rendezvous, enters the tavern and finds him drunk. The poet tells her to leave ("Farewell, I will not follow you, phantom, the spectre of the past", "Adieu, je ne vais pas vous suivre, fantôme, spectre du passé"), and Lindorf, waiting in the shadows, comes forth. Nicklausse explains to Stella that Hoffmann does not love her anymore, but Councillor Lindorf is waiting for her. Some students enter the room for more drinking while Stella and Lindorf leave together.

== Musical numbers ==
Prologue

- 1. Prélude.
- 2. Introduction et Couplets: "Glou! Glou!... La vérité, dit-on, sortait d'un puits" (La Muse, Chorus).
- 3. Récitatif: "Le conseiller Lindorf, morbleu!" (Lindorf, Andrès).
- 4. Couplets: "Dans les rôles d'amoureux langoureux" (Lindorf).
- 5. Scène et Choeur: "Deux heures devant moi... Drig, drig" (Lindorf, Luther, Nathanaël, Hermann, Wilhelm, Wolfram, Chorus).
- 6. Scène: "Vrai Dieu! Mes amis" (Hoffmann, Nicklausse, Lindorf, Luther, Nathanaël, Hermann, Wilhelm, Wolfram, Chorus).
- 7. Chanson: "Il était une fois à la cour d'Eisenach!" (Hoffmann, Lindorf, Luther, Nathanaël, Hermann, Wilhelm, Wolfram, Chorus).
- 8. Scène: "Peuh! Cette bière est détestable" (Hoffmann, Nicklausse, Lindorf, Luther, Nathanaël, Hermann, Wilhelm, Wolfram, Chorus).
- 9. Duo et Scène: "Et par où votre Diablerie" (Hoffmann, Nicklausse, Lindorf, Luther, Nathanaël, Hermann, Wilhelm, Wolfram, Chorus).
- 10. Final: "Je vous dis, moi" (Hoffmann, Nicklausse, Lindorf, Luther, Nathanaël, Hermann, Wilhelm, Wolfram, Chorus).

Act 1: Olympia

1911 recording of Lucette Korsoff singing "Les oiseaux dans la charmille" from Offenbach's The Tales of Hoffmann.

- 11. Entracte.
- 12. Récitatif: "Allons! Courage et confiance!" (Hoffmann).
- 13. Scène et Couplets: "Pardieu! J'étais bien sur" (Nicklausse, Hoffmann).
- 14. Trio: "C'est moi, Coppélius" (Coppélius, Hoffmann, Nicklausse).
- 15. Scène: "Non aucun hôte vraiment" (Hoffmann, Nicklausse, Cochenille, Olympia, Spallanzani, Chorus).
- 16. Chanson: "Les oiseaux dans la charmille" (Olympia, Chorus).
- 17. Scène: "Ah! Mon ami! Quel accent!" (Hoffmann, Nicklausse, Cochenille, Olympia, Spallanzani, Chorus).
- 18. Récitatif et Romance: "Ils se sont éloignés enfin!" (Hoffmann, Olympia).
- 19. Duo: "Tu me fuis?" (Hoffmann, Nicklausse, Coppélius).
- 20. Final: "En place les danseurs" (Hoffmann, Nicklausse, Coppélius, Cochenille, Olympia, Spallanzani, Chorus).

Act 2: Antonia

- 21. Entracte.
- 22. Rêverie: "Elle a fui, la tourterelle" (Antonia).
- 23. Couplets: "Jour et nuit" (Frantz).
- 24. Récitatif: "Enfin je vais avoir pourquoi" (Hoffmann, Nicklausse).
- 25. Air du Violon: "Vois sous l'archet frémissant" (Nicklausse).
- 26. Scène: "Ah! J'ai le savais bien" (Hoffmann, Antonia).
- 27. Duo: "C'est une chanson d'amour" (Hoffmann, Antonia).
- 28. Quatuor: "Pour conjurer le danger" (Hoffmann, Crespel, Miracle, Antonia).
- 29. Trio: "Tu ne chanteras plus?" (Miracle, Antonia, Le Fantôme)
- 30. Final: "Mon enfant, ma fille! Antonia!" (Crespel, Antonia, Hoffmann, Nicklausse, Miracle).

Act 3: Giulietta

- 31. Entracte.
- 32. Barcarolle: "Messieurs, silence!... Belle nuit, ô nuit d'amour" (Hoffmann, Nicklausse, Giulietta, Chorus).
- 33. Chant Bacchique: "Et moi, ce n'est pas là, pardieu!... Amis, l'amour tendre et rêveur" (Hoffmann, Nicklausse).
- 34. Mélodrame (Musique-de-scène).
- 35. Chanson du Diamant: "Tourne, tourne, miroir" (Dappertutto).
- 36. Mélodrame (Musique-de-scène).
- 37. Scène de Jeu: "Giulietta, palsambleu!" (Hoffmann, Nicklausse, Dappertutto, Pittichinaccio, Giulietta, Schlémil, Chorus).
- 38. Récitatif et Romance: "Ton ami dit vrai!... Ô Dieu, de quelle ivresse" (Hoffmann, Giulietta).
- 39. Duo de Reflet: "Jusque-là cependant" (Hoffmann, Giulietta).
- 40. Final: "Ah! Tu m'as défiée" (Hoffmann, Nicklausse, Dappertutto, Pittichinaccio, Giulietta, le capitaine des sbires, Chorus).

Epilogue: Stella

- 41. Entracte.
- 42. Chœur: "Folie! Oublie tes douleurs!" (Luther, Nathanaël, Hermann, Wilhelm, Wolfram, Chorus).
- 43. Chœur: "Glou! Glou! Glou!" (Hoffmann, Nicklausse, Lindorf, Luther, Nathanaël, Hermann, Wilhelm, Wolfram, Chorus).
- 44. Couplet: "Pour le cœur de Phrygné" (Hoffmann, Chorus)
- 45. Apothéose: "Des cendres de ton cœur" (Hoffmann, La Muse, Lindorf, Andrès, Stella, Luther, Nathanaël, Hermann, Wilhelm, Wolfram, Chorus).

The aria "Chanson de Kleinzach" (Song of little Zaches) in the prologue is based on the short story "Klein Zaches, genannt Zinnober" ("Little Zaches, called cinnabar"), 1819. The barcarolle, "Belle nuit, ô nuit d'amour" in the Venetian act, is the opera's famous number, borrowed by Offenbach from his earlier opera Rheinnixen (French: Les fées du Rhin).

== Editions ==
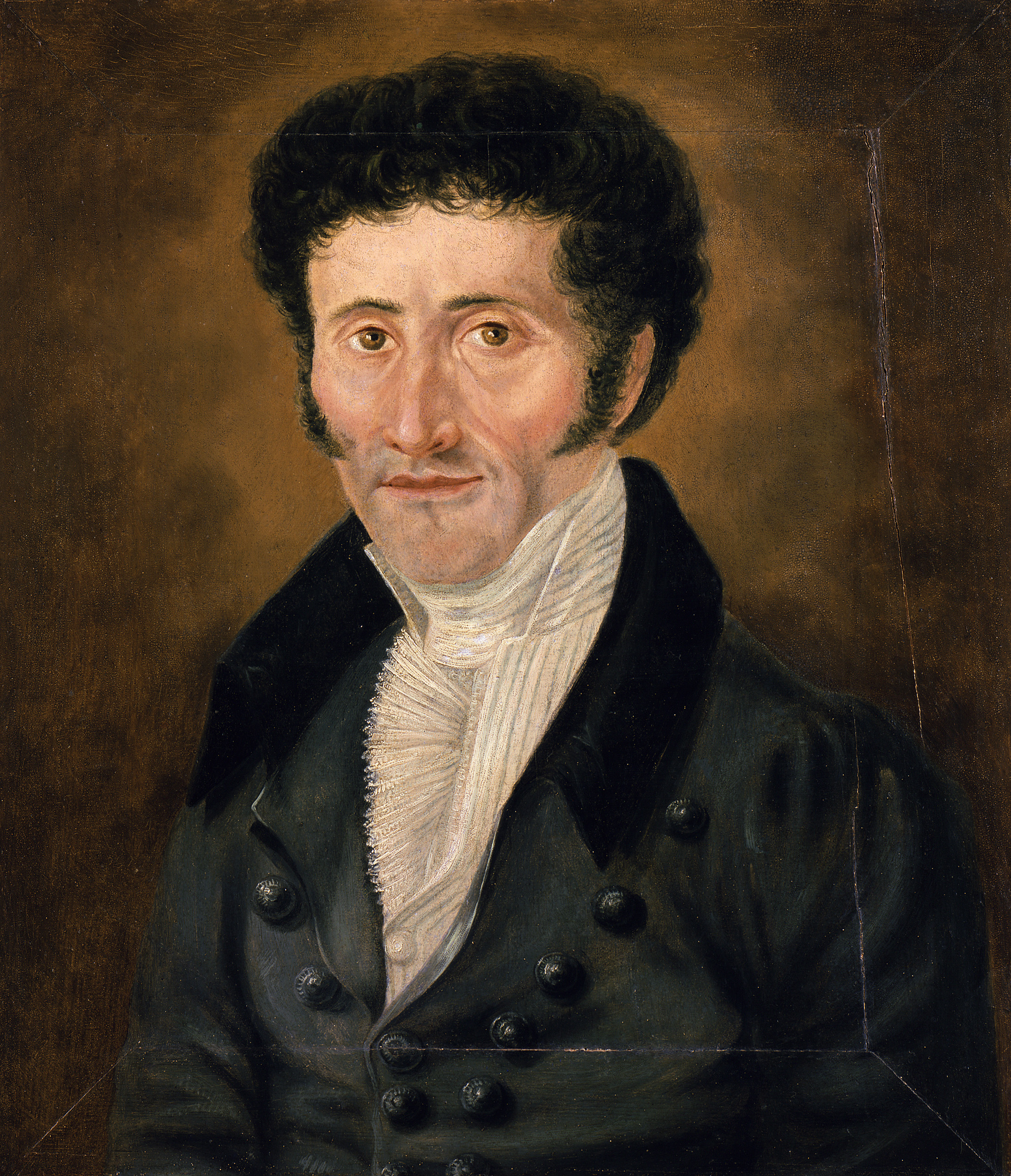
Oil painting of E. T. A. Hoffmann (1776–1822)

Offenbach died four months before the premiere, having completed the piano score and some orchestration. As a result of this and the practical demands of the Opéra-Comique director, different editions of the opera emerged, some bearing little resemblance to his conception, with cuts or the addition of music he did not sketch or compose. The version performed at the opera's premiere was by Ernest Guiraud, after completing Offenbach's scoring, but without the Giulietta act, some of its music being moved to the Antonia act and epilogue. Choudens published at least four divergent scores of the opera in 1881 and 1882. At the Opéra-Comique in Paris, dialogue between musical numbers would be spoken; for productions outside France, he would have composed recitatives to replace it.

The work was the object of considerable further rewriting for a 1904 production in Monte Carlo by the theatre director Raoul Gunsbourg and André Bloch with new words by Barbier's son Pierre. The air "Scintille, diamant", based on a theme from the overture to Offenbach's A Journey to the Moon was added for Dapertutto, and a sextet (sometimes called septet, counting the chorus) containing elements of the barcarolle, to make a climax to the final scene. Much of this was reproduced in 1907 by Choudens in performance materials, which also gave Dapertutto's original air to Coppélius and added a passage where Hoffmann realizes that he has lost his reflection. This edition held sway for many years around the world, while the practice arose of assigning the soprano roles to different singers, a basic denial of the dramatic unity of the work. Offenbach intended the four soprano roles be taken by the same singer, for Olympia, Giulietta, and Antonia are three facets of Stella, Hoffmann's unreachable love. Similarly, the four villains (Lindorf, Coppélius, Miracle, and Dapertutto) would be the same bass-baritone, as they all represent the evil forces against which he is pitted. There were a few attempts to return to Offenbach's original intentions, including a “pioneering version” by the conductor Arthur Hammond for the Carl Rosa Opera Company in 1952. Richard Bonynge tried to revert to Offenbach's conception for his 1971 complete recording, despite the major lack of source material at that time.

Since the 1970s new performing editions appeared, particularly after the discovery of manuscript sources by conductor Antonio de Almeida, used in editions by Fritz Oeser in 1976 and Michael Kaye in 1988. While compiling a thematic catalogue of Offenbach's works, de Almeida went to the house in Saint-Mandé of the heir of one of the composer's daughters, containing Offenbach's piano, and discovered a folder containing the manuscript parts (in the hand of Offenbach's copyists, but with autograph annotations), including those used in May 1879. The 1,250 manuscript-page find comprised parts of autograph vocal score, fragments of libretto and the Venice act orchestrated by Guiraud. de Almeida considered the main improvement was “the emergence of Nicklausse/Muse as the most important character after the title-role” giving meaning to the overall narrative and the Muse–Hoffmann relationship. “When the Muse at the end sings to Hoffmann that it is to her he has to turn, the main thread of the work is made clear”. This version also allowed Act 1 (Olympia) to flow directly from the Prologue (so the minuet is reserved for the entrance of the guests later); there is also a seamless transition from Act 3 (Giulietta) into the Epilogue. French Offenbach scholar Jean-Christophe Keck comments that Oeser in fact reorchestrated around three-quarters of the score, introducing new instruments, adding more from Die Rheinnixen and added back cuts made by the composer. The Oeser version was given in full for the first time in Reims in 1983 and recorded by EMI in 1988.

In 1984 a London auction sold manuscripts of 300 pages found at the Château de Cormatin, which had belonged to Gunsbourg, consisting of virtually all the cuts from the initial rehearsal period. American researcher Michael Kaye learnt about these and set about making his own edition of 1992 (first performed on stage at the Los Angeles Opera in 1988), but, then, additional authentic music was found, and published in 1999. In 2011 a critical joint edition ('Kaye-Keck') was released reflecting and reconciling the research of recent decades and productions drawing on this edition (including prior to its publication) have been premiered from 1988 (US), followed by France (1993), Germany (1995), UK (1998), China (2005) and Russia (2011).

A version including the authentic music by Offenbach was reconstructed by the Offenbach scholar Jean-Christophe Keck. A performance of this version was produced at the Lausanne Opera (Switzerland). In early 2016, Jean-Christophe Keck announced that he had traced and identified the full manuscript of the Prologue and the Olympia act, with vocal lines by Offenbach and instrumentation by Guiraud. The Antonia act and epilogue are in the Bibliothèque nationale de France, while the Giulietta act is in Offenbach family archives.

Writing in 1997, Andrew Lamb observed that “the original order of acts, a single soprano heroine and single baritone villain, identification of Nicklause with the Muse” as well as removal of accretions by Barbier and Bloch “give a faithful representation of Offenbach's conception".

== Recordings ==
The opera is frequently recorded. Well-regarded recordings include:

- a 1964–65 recording conducted by André Cluytens with the Paris Conservatoire Orchestra and Nicolai Gedda
- a 1971 recording by Richard Bonynge with the Orchestre de la Suisse Romande, Plácido Domingo, Joan Sutherland, Huguette Tourangeau and Gabriel Bacquier
- a 1972 recording by Julius Rudel with the London Symphony Orchestra, Stuart Burrows, Beverly Sills, Norman Treigle, and Susanne Marsee.
- a 1988 recording by Sylvain Cambreling, Brussels Opéra National du Théâtre Royal de la Monnaie; EMI, Cat: 358613–2, studio recording based on the Oeser version
- a 1986 recording by Seiji Ozawa, French National Orchestra, Radio France Choir; Deutsche Grammophon label Cat: 427682; with Plácido Domingo and Edita Gruberová
- a 1996 studio recording by Kent Nagano, Chorus and Orchestra of the Opéra National de Lyon and Roberto Alagna as Hoffmann; Erato, Cat: 0630-14330-2. This recording is based on the Kaye-Keck version of the opera.

== Film ==
- Hoffmanns Erzählungen (1916), a silent German film adaptation directed by Richard Oswald
- The Tales of Hoffmann (1923), an Austrian silent film directed by and starring Max Neufeld
- The Tales of Hoffmann (1951), a British film adaptation written, produced, and directed by Michael Powell and Emeric Pressburger
- Hoffmanns Erzählungen (1970), a German film adaptation directed by Walter Felsenstein and Georg F. Mielke

== Dance ==
Peter Darrell choreographed a ballet, Tales of Hoffmann, to Offenbach's works, mostly from the latter's opera.
