= Albert Vizentini =

French violinist, composer, conductor and music writer

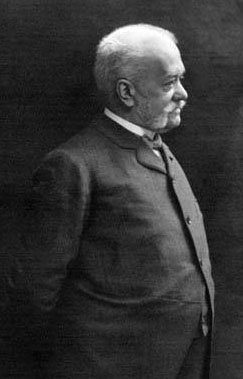

Background information
- Born: November 9, 1841; Paris, France
- Died: October 21, 1906 (aged 64) Paris, France
- Instrument: Violin

Albert Vizentini (9 November 1841 – 21 October 1906) was a French violinist, composer, conductor and music writer. His main centre of activity was the French capital, but he also worked for ten years in Russia and toured in Britain and Ireland.

== Life and career ==
Vizentini came from an Italian musical family active in the theatre, one of whom had established himself at the Comédie-Italienne. As a child he appeared in various children's roles at the Théâtre de l'Odéon, making his debut on 31 December 1847 in Le Dernier Banquet, a revue by Camille Doucet. His father Augustin worked at the Vaudeville Theatre in Paris, then became stage manager in the last season of the Théâtre Lyrique.

He undertook musical studies at the Conservatoire in Brussels, under Leonard and Fétis, achieving first prize in violin in 1860 and a first prize in composition in 1861. After briefly acting as assistant conductor at the theatre in Antwerp he returned to Paris.

Vizentini joined the orchestra of the Théâtre des Bouffes-Parisiens then became leader of the orchestra at the Théâtre Lyrique from 1861 to 1866, as well as appearing as a concert soloist. He began conducting at the Théâtre de la Porte-Saint-Martin and toured with another French operetta troupe to London, English provincial towns and Ireland,

From 1865 to 1873 Vizentini wrote about the theatre and music for various journals, displaying a lively wit and solid knowledge. His articles appeared in Le Charivari, L'Entr'acte, the Grand Journal, Paris-Magazine, L'Événement illustré, L'Éclair, and he founded a short-lived theatrical bulletin Le Télégraphe.

Having started to work at the Théâtre de la Gaîté-Lyrique Vizentini took over from Offenbach there in 1875, where he acted as both music director and administrator. He started with a lavish premiere production on 26 October of Le voyage dans la lune by Offenbach. The following year he attempted to rekindle the spirit and repertoire of the Théâtre Lyrique, by bringing on more substantial operas. He had much support, in particular from composers, the press and public administration, and secured a subsidy towards the running costs. The major premiere was to be Dimitri by Victorin de Joncières, an opera in 5 acts, for which Vizentini assembled a notable cast of singers, including Victor Capoul, Michot, Jacques Bouhy, Léon Melchissédec, Grivot and Heilbron. He next decided to mount a production of Paul et Virginie by Victor Massé which enjoyed a major success, followed by works such as Le Timbre d'argent, by Saint-Saëns, Le Bravo by Salivaire, and L'Aumônier du régiment by Hector Salomon. Nonetheless, in spite of artistic success and public sympathy the company closed after twenty months in early January 1878.

Vizentini organised a massive music festival in December 1878 at the Paris Hippodrome with at least 15,000 spectators, where he shared the podium with contemporary composers conducting their own works. On 18 May 1879 Vizentini was part of the group gathered at Offenbach's house for the first private performance of Les contes d'Hoffmann.

From 1879 to 1889 Vizentini was chief conductor and stage manager of the Imperial Theatres of St Petersburg, also conducting the Pavlovsk concerts. He premiered Richard III by Salvayre which was not a success, and arranged the music for the ballet The King's Command or The Pupils of Dupré in 1886.

Back in France he became the administrator of the Théâtre des Variétés and the Théâtre des Folies-Dramatiques, then from September 1894 stage manager of the Théâtre du Gymnase. In 1897 Vizentini became director of the Grand Théâtre de Lyon, where he staged and conducted the first French performance of Wagner's Die Meistersinger. Later he was invited by Albert Carré (with whom he had worked at the Gymnase) to come to the Opéra-Comique as stage director, which he did from 1898. After a three-month illness he died before the start of the 1906–07 season.

== Compositions ==
Vizentini composed four opérettes, La Tsigane (Folies-Marigny, 1865), Le Moulin ténébreux (Bouffes-Parisiens, 1869) La Plantation Thomassin (Théâtre - Vichy, 1894) and La Gaudriole (Villa Les Fleurs - Aix-les-Bains, 1897). He also wrote two cantatas performed at the Vaudeville and the Porte-Saint-Martin, and music for several plays including Nos ancêtres, Cadio, Patrie, Le Bossu, etc. He also published fantasies for violin and piano, a great ballet "Ordre du Roi", and a lot of song and dances.

His humorous book Derrière la toile (Foyers, Coulisses, Comédiens) Physiologies des théâtres Parisiens. Faure, 1868, recounts his observations of the different theatres in Paris and pen-portraits of famous artists.
