= Christian French (disambiguation) =

Christian French may refer to:

- Christianity in France
- Christian French (singer) (born 1997), American singer
- Christian (French actor) (1821–1889), French actor
