= From the Earth to the Moon (disambiguation) =

From the Earth to the Moon is a science fiction novel by Jules Verne.

From the Earth to the Moon may also refer to:

- From the Earth to the Moon (film), a 1958 adaptation of the novel
- From the Earth to the Moon (miniseries), a 1998 television miniseries about the U.S. Apollo Moon missions

== See also ==
- Le voyage dans la lune (operetta) (A Trip to the Moon), an operetta by Jacques Offenbach, based on Verne's novel
- A Trip to the Moon, for the film versions
