= Ringtheater fire =

1881 fire in Vienna

Coordinates: 48.215°N 16.363°E

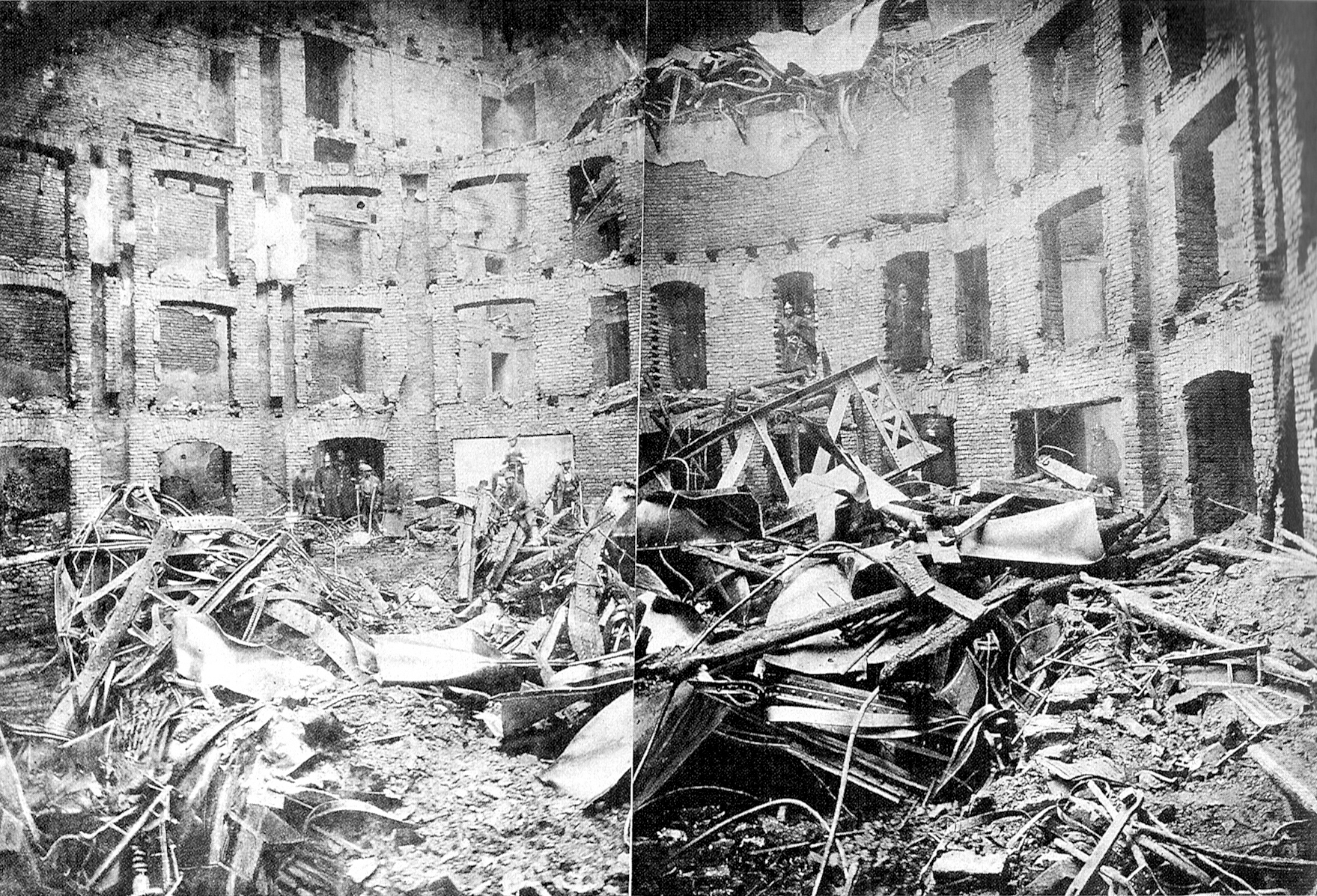
- Ruins of the Viennese Ringtheater on 8 December 1881
- Date: 8 December 1881; 144 years ago
- Time: Around 7:00 pm
- Location: Vienna, Austro-Hungarian Empire
- Cause: Gas explosion (caused by malfunctioning gas lamps) and subsequent ignition of theater curtains
- Outcome: Viennese Ringtheater destroyed
- Deaths: 384–449
- Convictions: Theater owner Franz von Jauner sentenced to three years of prison (later commuted to several weeks)

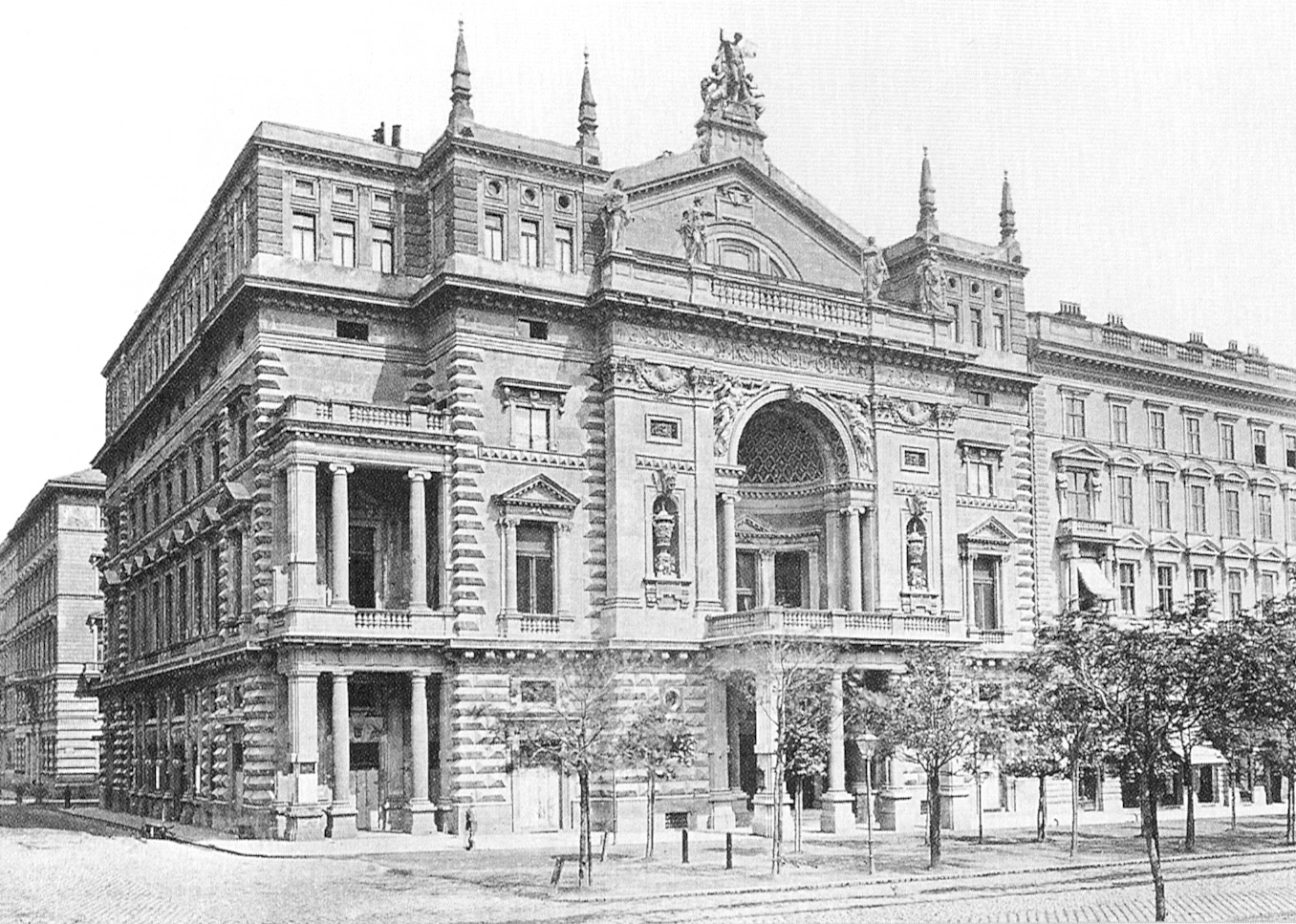
Ringtheater in Vienna, photographed before 1881

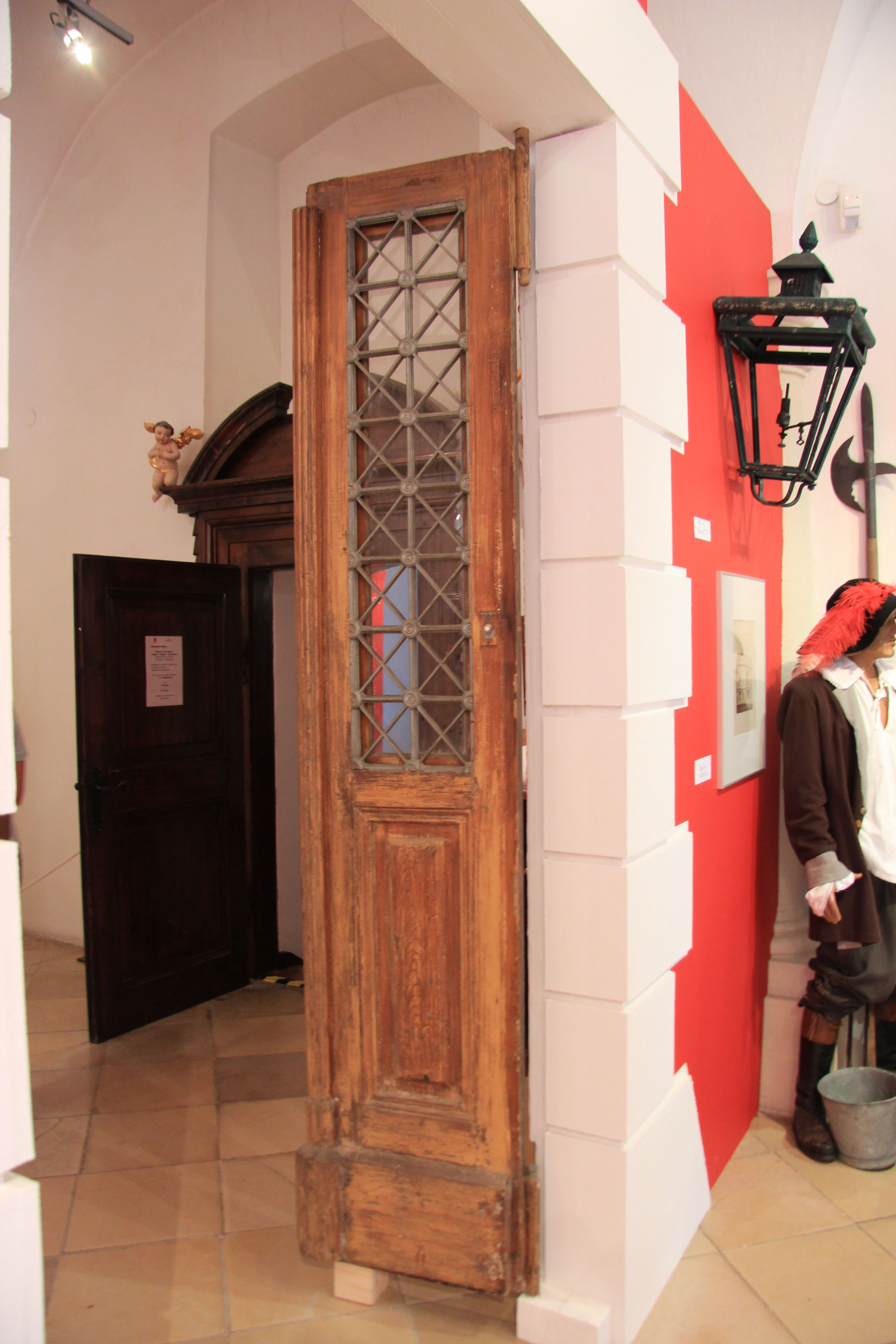
At a firefighting exposition in Geras, one of the Ringtheater exits was shown

The Ringtheater fire occurred on 8 December 1881, in the popular Viennese Ringtheater, named after the road it was located at, the Schottenring. Before the fire, the privately run theater, with capacity for an audience of about 1700, had been suffering from financial problems. Officially, 384 people perished in the fire, though there are higher estimates. For example, the Prussian-born author and encyclopedian Ludwig Julius Eisenberg (1858–1910) claims that up to one thousand could have been killed.

== Description ==
During that evening, Jacques Offenbach's Les Contes d'Hoffmann was scheduled. When the visitors assumed their seats at 7 PM, behind the stage five display cases were illuminated with gas lamps. Because the electro-pneumatic ignition control succeeded to light the gas only at the second attempt, the gas that had already flowed out exploded. The subsequent fire burned the fly system, and the fire quickly spread to the rest of the stage and the auditorium.

It was only with a delay of half an hour that the fire brigade began rescuing the occupants, but several problems quickly compounded the rescue efforts: The emergency lighting used oil lamps, but they did not light. Because of scarce financial resources, they were only filled before mandatory checks were taking place. Then, the emergency exits opened only inwards, effectively shutting the victims in. Through a window at the side of the building, fresh air flowed in, which stoked the fire. Finally, because of a misjudgment, the police (the Sicherheitswache in then-Austria) told rescuers to leave, because they thought everybody had already been rescued.

Among the dead was Ladislaus Vetsera, an uncle of Baroness Mary Vetsera.

== Impact ==
After the fire, a militia rescue organization, the Wiener Freiwillige Rettungsgesellschaft, was founded. It lasted until 1938 and its duties were taken over by the Viennese city council after the war. Then, fire prevention measures were enacted. Safety curtains became mandatory in order to contain stage fires and theatre props had to be impregnated to make them fire-resistant. Likewise, the bigger theatres were forced to employ a uniformed security guard who would oversee the evacuation and must remain on-site until the last spectator left the premises – a rule which still stands today.

The then-operator of the Ringtheater, Franz von Jauner, was sentenced to three years in prison, though his sentence was commuted by an imperial decree just a few weeks into his prison stay. The burned-out shell of the theater was demolished and emperor Franz Joseph I privately funded the construction of an apartment building on the same site. It featured a chapel on the second floor and the profits from letting the rooms were perennially dedicated to charitable causes.

The psychoanalyst of later fame, Sigmund Freud, who narrowly missed attending the evening of the fire, was one of the first occupants of the apartment building. In 1945, the so-called "Sühnhaus" (literally "atonement house") was destroyed in an air raid and was fully dismantled in 1951. The site is now occupied by an office of the police.
