= Franz von Jauner =

Austrian theatre director and opera intendant

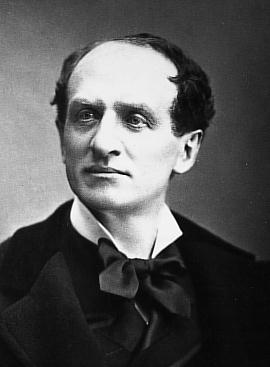
Franz Ritter von Jauner

Franz Ritter von Jauner (14 November 1831, in Vienna – 23 February 1900, in Vienna) was an Austrian theatre director and opera intendant. He was the subject of a 1940 biographical film Operetta in which he was played by Willi Forst.

Franz Jauner was born in 1831, the son of a well-regarded court engraver, also named Franz. He began his successful acting career shortly after leaving school. He eventually became known as a talented actor, conductor, and director at Vienna's Carltheater, which he joined in 1871. From 1875 to 1880, he was the director of the Vienna Court Opera, where he directed the first performance of Richard Wagner's Ring des Nibelungen outside of Bayreuth and the German-language premier of Georges Bizet's Carmen. He also brought Giuseppe Verdi to the opera house for the Viennese premiere of his Requiem. For his services to art, he was decorated with the Order of the Iron Crown, third class in 1880, after which he styled himself as Franz Ritter von Jauner.

Jauner was the director of the Ringtheater during its disastrous 1881 fire, for which he was sentenced to three years in prison. However, his sentence was commuted by imperial pardon after a few weeks in custody. He stayed away from directing until 1884, when he was appointed to the directorship of the Theater an der Wien until 1894, after which he returned to the Carltheater. His artistic success was always considerably greater than his financial success; he committed suicide by gunshot with his wife on 24 February 1900, one day after the heavily indebted couple failed an audit.
