= André Balbon =

French opera singer

André Balbon was a French bass opera singer, born in Paris, on 4 June 1902 and died in Alicante (Spain), on 30 March 1984. He was principally active in France in character roles.

== Life and career ==
In 1924 he appeared in Les Burgraves by Léo Sachs at the Théâtre des Champs-Élysées, before working in the French provinces for several years.

Balbon made his debut at the Paris Opéra-Comique on 1 November 1928 as un Officier in Lorenzaccio by Moret. From then until the 1940s he was a regular member of the Opéra-Comique company with an extensive repertoire. He sang in the Paris premieres of Bourgeois de Falaise by Thiriet (Sottencourt), Comme ils s'aiment by Lavagne (Lustrac), Esther de Carpentras by Milhaud (Cacan), Fou de la Dame by Delannoy (Cavalier noir), Frasquita by Lehar (Aristide), Georges Dandin by d’Ollone (Sottenville), Nuit Embaumée by Hirschmann (Ali), Mon Oncle Benjamin by Bousquet (Pontcassé), Rayon de Soieries by Rosenthal (Monsieur Loyal), Riquet à la Houppe by Hue (Marquis de Carabas), le Roi d'Yvetot by Ibert (Renaud), le Testament de Tante Caroline by Roussel (Maître Corbeau), Tout Ank Amon by Pérez (Hapousend), Vieux Garçons by Urgel (von Petersboom), and Zadig by Duperrier (Arimage).

He also appeared in Angélique (le Nègre), le Barbier de Séville (Basilio), la Bohème (Colline) le Bon roi Dagobert (Éloi), les Brigands (Chef des Carabiniers), Carmen (Zuniga), les Contes d’Hoffmann (Lindorf), l'Étoile (Sirocco), Gargantua (three roles), Gianni Schicchi (title role), la Habanéra (le Vieux), Louise (Bricoleur, Chiffonnier), Madame Butterfly (Sharpless), Manon (le Comte), Mariage Secret (Comte Robinson), le Médecin malgré lui (Sganarelle), Mignon (Lothario), Philémon et Baucis (Vulcain), le Roi malgré lui (Villequier), la Rôtisserie de la Reine Pédauque (d'Astarac), le Roi d'Ys (le Roi), Tosca (Angelotti), la Traviata (Docteur), and Werther (Bruhlmann).

In 1933 Balbon created the title role in Marc Berthomieu's opérette Robert Macaire, at the Grand Théâtre in Le Havre.

For two seasons, from 1953 to 1955, Balbon sang at the Théâtre de la Monnaie, Brussels, appearing as Calchas (La Belle Hélène), Pomarel (La Chaste Suzanne by Jean Gilbert), Gaspard (Les Cloches de Corneville) and the Baron de Gondremark (La Vie parisienne).

In 1934 he appeared as Popoff in the Meilhac version of Die lustige Witwe “La Veuve Joyeuse” at the Théâtre de la Gaîté-Lyrique in Paris and returned to the role in Geneva in February 1954 in a Grand Théâtre de Genève production starring Jacques Jansen as Danilo.

Balbon participated in Feu d'artifice by Erik Charell and Jurg Amstein with music by Paul Burkhard starring Suzy Delair at the Théâtre Marigny in 1952. He sang Robinet in the premiere of the comédie lyrique Colombe by Jean-Michel Damase and Jean Anouilh on 5 May 1961.

== Recordings ==
- L’Etoile (Sirocco) conducted by Roger Désormière, 1941
- Là-Haut (Saint Pierre) conducted by Jacques-Henri Rys (1953)
- Madame Favart (Major Cortignac) conducted by Marcel Cariven (1960, French Radio)
- Hans le Joueur de flûte (Pippermann) conducted by Jules Gressier (1957, French Radio)
- Gilette de Narbonne (Le Roi René) conducted by Pierre Tellier (1957, French Radio)
- Le voyage en Chine (Pompéry) conducted by Marcel Cariven (1958, French Radio)
- Geneviève de Brabant (Vanderprout) conducted by Marcel Cariven (1956, French Radio)

His recordings on 78s of songs and individual excerpts from the stage include « C’est toute une histoire » from Le bon Roi Dagobert, the Song of the Flea from La Damnation de Faust, « Tristes amours » and « Je la vois » from Galathée, « Vallons de l’Helvétie » from Le Chalet, the stances of Nilakhanta from Lakmé, Basilio's calumny aria from Le Barbier de Séville, Ralph΄s « Quand la flamme de l’amour » from La jolie fille de Perth, « Je comprends que la belle » from Le Caïd, and airs from operas by Bazin, Flotow, Gounod, Lecocq, Massenet, Meyerbeer and Varnay.
