= Le voyage dans la lune (opera-féerie) =

1875 opéra-féerie in four acts and 23 scenes by Jacques Offenbach

Jacques Offenbach by Nadar, c. 1860s

Le voyage dans la Lune (French pronunciation: [lə vwajaʒ dɑ̃ la lyn], A Trip to the Moon) is an 1875 opéra-féerie in four acts and 23 scenes by Jacques Offenbach. Loosely based on the 1865 novel From the Earth to the Moon by Jules Verne, its French libretto was by Albert Vanloo, Eugène Leterrier and Arnold Mortier. This was another prolific year for the composer, that included also the third version of Geneviève de Brabant, Les hannetons, La boulangère a des écus, La créole and a waltz for Tarte à la crême.

It premiered on 26 November 1875 at the Théâtre de la Gaîté. The production was revived at the Théâtre du Châtelet on 31 March 1877.

== History ==
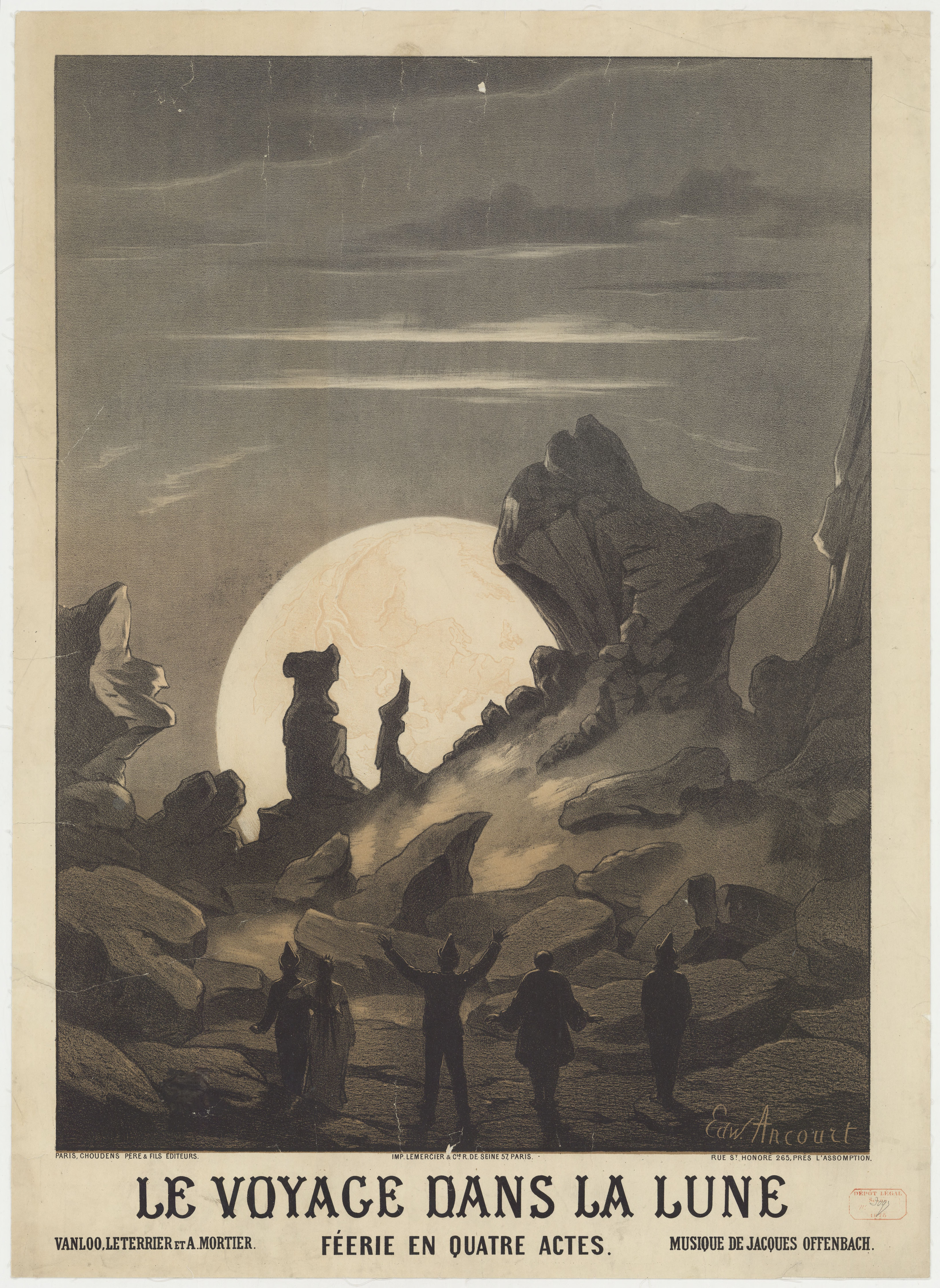
1875 poster from the première of the operetta, by Edward Ancourt

=== Genesis ===
The idea for the work was presented to Offenbach while he was head (director) of the Théâtre de la Gaîté, but due to the need to raise the necessary money he did not take up the project. Eventually Albert Vizentini, the new directeur of the Gaîté, took up the idea, and Offenbach's contribution was limited to that of composer.

Albert Vanloo and Eugène Leterrier, in association with Arnold Mortier (columnist at Le Figaro), wrote the libretto. They were hoping for a repeat of the success of the novels of Jules Verne (another, the 1872 novel Le Tour du monde en quatre-vingt jours, had been adapted for the stage at the Théâtre de la Porte Saint-Martin by Verne himself in 1874) and the public taste for grand spectacles.

A few days after the premiere of Voyage dans la lune, Jules Verne complained about its similarities to his work: "Two days after the first production of Voyage à la lune [sic] the loans to the authors from From the Earth to the Moon as the point of departure and from "Centre of the Earth" as the dénouement seem to me incontestable.". This dispute does not seem to have continued, or may have been settled amicably, for by 1877, Offenbach based his Le docteur Ox on another Jules Verne novel, with his agreement.

Siegfried Kracauer views Voyage dans la lune as a demonstration of Offenbach's flair for topicality, and here "mixing science and fairy-tales, and building modern Utopias into the traditional framework of the pantomime". This included a huge gun to send the characters to the Moon in the first act, a fantastic evocation of life on the Moon, and a volcanic eruption in the fourth act.

=== Production ===
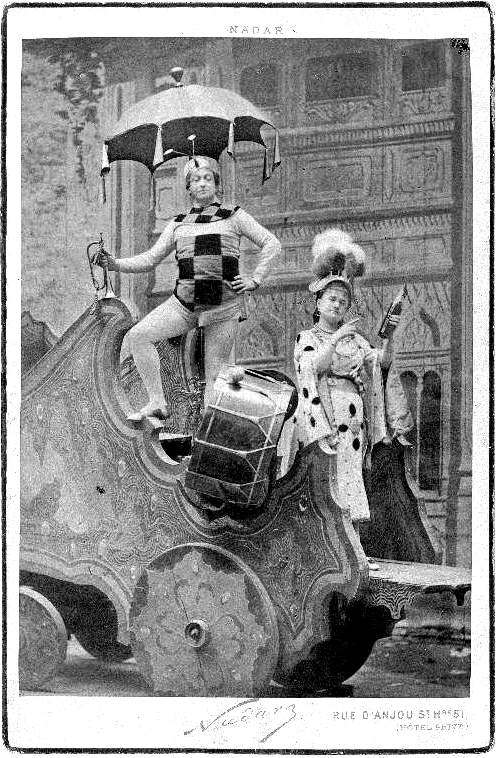
Christian (Vlan) and Zulma Bouffar (Prince Caprice) in Le voyage dans la Lune, in the charlatans scene.

The première of the opéra-féerie Le voyage dans la lune occurred on 26 November 1875 at Théâtre de la Gaîté in Paris. The French correspondent for The Times wrote "The piece is, I think, a success, less great, probably, than that of [the 1874 play] Le Tour de monde en quatre-vingt jours [sic] but which will be marked."

No expense had been spared on the scenery – the 24 majestic sets by Cornil, Fromont and Chéret replicated places (such as the Observatory of Paris, a high-furnace, a lunar passage or a volcano) and created original architectural conceits (such as a glass palace or mother-of-pearl galleries). The use of "trucs", trap-doors and artifices accentuated the surprise-effects on the spectators. The producers even borrowed a dromedary from the Jardin d'Acclimatation. The 673 costumes were designed by Alfred Grévin, and the two ballets choreographed by M. Justament. The principal roles were taken by Zulma Bouffar (in the principal boy role of Prince Caprice – reviews stated she "sang with esprit and acted with intelligence and finesse"), Christian (Vlan), Pierre Grivot (Microscope), Tissier (Cosmos) et Mlle Marcus (Fantasia). At the première, the Ronde des Charlatans, interpreted by Zulma Bouffar and Christian, won an encore. The front of the theatre had a large model of the Moon to advertise the new opera.

The success of the show, whose première raised 3,898 francs, led to the theatre's receipts passing 10,018 francs with its seventh performance. Le Voyage dans la Lune left its mark on the year in which it first appeared: seven Parisian winter revues in 1875–1876 made reference to it (Voyage de la Lune à Paris, Mme Angot dans la Lune, Le Voyage du Soleil, Les Voyageurs pour Belleville, Les Voyageurs pour la Lune, Allons voir la Lune, mon gars!, La Lune à Paris).

The rôle of Caprice was portrayed by Mme Peschard from 16 December 1875 until 16 February 1876, since Zulma Bouffar had to honour a two-month engagement at Saint Petersburg. From 28 February 1876, the rôle of Popotte returned to Thérésa. For her, Offenbach added four airs to the score. Le Figaro noted: "Thérésa and her songs produced a great effect. There were two especially, in the third act, that she detailed with an exquisite finesse and art."

Le Voyage dans la Lune was also put on in London at the Alhambra Theatre on 15 April 1876, and Vienna at the Theater an der Wien on 16 April 1876.

The last performance at the Théâtre de la Gaîté occurred on 25 April 1876 after 185 performances and 965,000 francs in ticket receipts. The work was revived within the year at the Théâtre du Châtelet from 31 March 1877 with many of the original cast. After two months, with ticket receipts of 226,457 francs, its 247th and last performance night was on 31 May 1877.

=== Later performance history ===
In 1980 Jérôme Savary made a production for the Komische Oper Berlin which was also seen in Cologne. In December 1985 the Grand Theatre in Geneva staged another production by Savary, described as "non-stop pantomime peppered with deliberate bad taste", with Marc Soustrot conducting the Orchestre de la Suisse Romande, Joseph Evans as Caprice, Marie McLaughlin as Fantasia, Michel Trempont as Vlan, Richard Cassinelli as Quipassparla and Jules Bastin as Cosmos.

In 2014 a co-production between Fribourg Opera, the Opéra de Lausanne and Opéra Éclaté was seen at the 34th Festival de Saint-Céré. There were performances at Opéra de Reims in 2016 directed by Olivier Desbordes and conducted by Dominique Trottein.

In January 2023 a new production with adapted dialogue was seen at the Opéra-Comique in Paris using members of the house's youth programme, conducted by Alexandra Cravero and staged by Laurent Pelly where a "mad world of the moon is a reflection of mayhem on earth". This production was later mounted at the Volksoper in Vienna in November 2023, again using studio, youth and children groups.

== Roles ==
Roles, voice types, premiere cast
Role	Voice type	Premiere cast, 26 November 1875 Conductor: Albert Vizentini	Cast (Châtelet), 31 March 1877
King Vlan	baritone	Christian	Christian
Cosmos	bass	Tissier	Tissier
Prince Quipasserparla	tenor	Habay	Habay
Microscope	tenor	Pierre Grivot	Guillot
Cactus	tenor	Laurent	Courtès
Cosinus		Étienne Scipion	Jacquier
Parabase		Legrenay	Beuzeville
Phichipsi		Colleuille	Colleuille
Rectangle		Jules Vizentini	Guimier
Oméga		Mallet	Auguste
Coefficient		Chevalier	Prudhomme
A-Plus-B		Henry	Panot
A guard		É. Scipion	Jacquier
A bourgeois		J. Vizentini	Jacquier
A poet		Chevalier	Chevalier
A male forge-worker		Barsagol	Thuillier
Grosbedon		Chevalier	Prudhomme
The commissaire	bass	Gravier	
A slave merchant		Van-de-Gand	Gillot
A Sélénite		Bousquet	
Prince Caprice	soprano	Zulma Bouffar	Zulma Bouffar
Princess Fantasia	soprano	Noémie Marcus	Lynnès
Queen Popotte	mezzo-soprano	Adèle Cuinet	Marcelle
Flamma	soprano	Blanche Méry	Noel
Adja	soprano	Maury	Géron
Phoebé		Dareine	Lévy
Stella		Davenay	Alice Régnault
A forge worker (female)		Z. Bied	Rébecca
Hyperba		Baudu	Durand
Microma (or Ita)		Blount	Capiglia
Bella		Godin	
Citizens, Courtiers, Astronomers, Blacksmiths, Artillery men, Moon-Dwellers, Counsellors, Maids of Honour, Guards, Stockbrokers and Speculators

== Synopsis ==
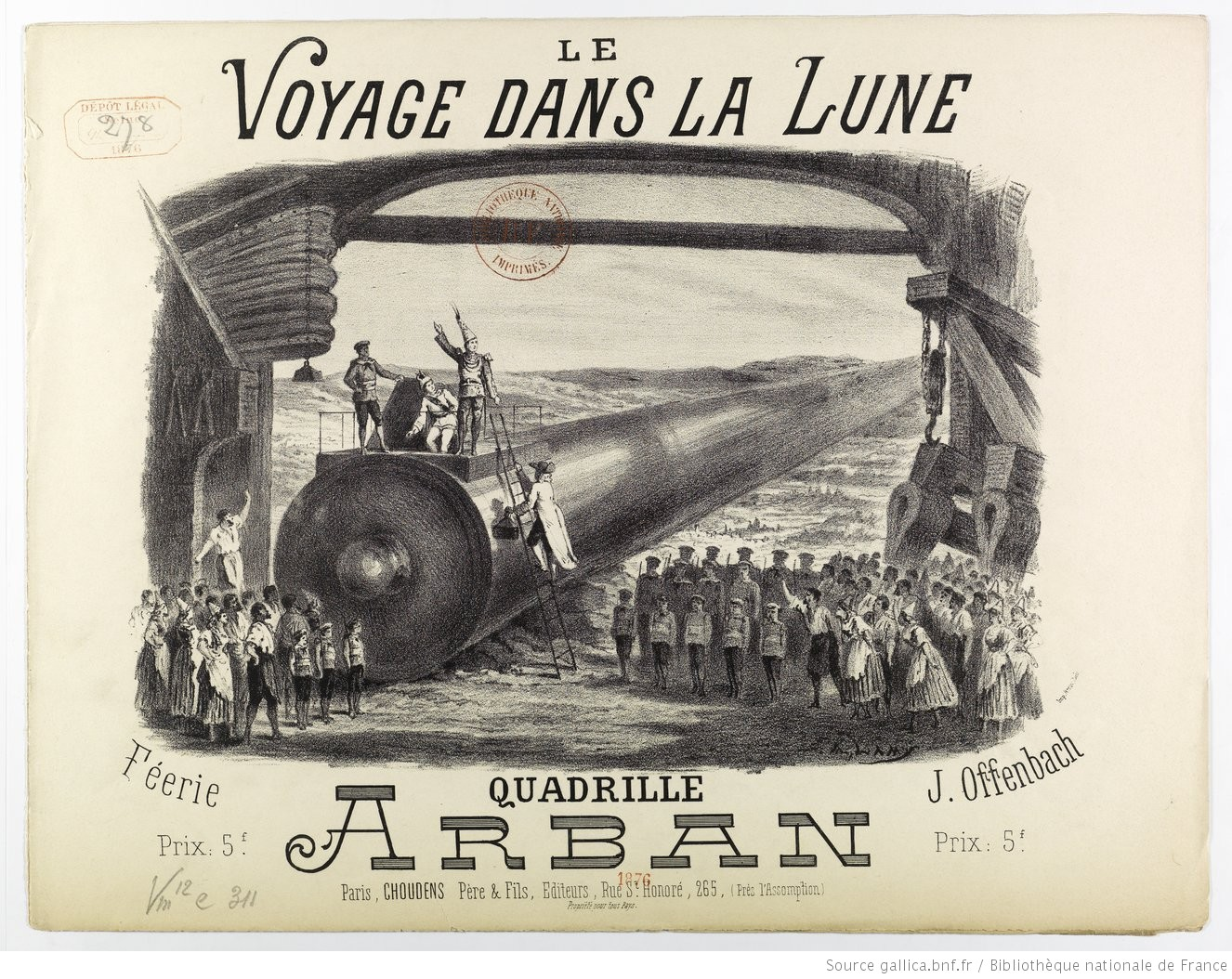
Sheet music showing scene from the piece

=== Act 1 ===
1st scene: Prince Caprice

On some part of the Earth, on a large square in the capital, King Vlan is preparing a festival in honour of his son, Prince Caprice, who has returned from a long journey undertaken for his education. On Caprice's arrival, King Vlan cedes him the crown, but Caprice refuses it, not wanting to govern or to marry but instead to have liberty, movement, air, space... The Moon, then rising, gives him an idea for his next destination. He asks his father to get him to this unknown and unexplored place. Vlan gives in and asks Microscope, the kingdom's greatest scholar, to find a way of getting there. Microscope replies that this mission regards the observatory.

2nd scene: At the observatory

Questioned, the astronomers do not reply and demand a commission. Furious at this evasion, Caprice crosses them off and proposes to do the same to Microscope if he does not find a way to the Moon. Microscope arranges that they meet 8 days later in his forge, and says he will find a way to the Moon in the interim.

3rd scene: At the forge

The forge-workers finish their work when Vlan and Caprice arrive 8 days later. Microscope unveils his means of getting to the Moon: a shell launched by a cannon. Due to the probability that the mission will go wrong, Microscope is forced to accompany Caprice. Vlan accedes to his son's insistent demands and also joins them on the trip.

4th scene: The departure

Vlan, Caprice and Microscope get into the shell. The artillery-men light the fuse and, with a huge detonation, the shell hurtles towards the Moon.

=== Act 2 ===
5th scene: The Moon

Hearing mysterious voices, we see a town with strange architecture.

6th scene: The arrival

The "Sélénites" (Moon-dwellers) fearfully observe a black point in the sky, and one asks another if it may be something sent by the "Terriens" (Earth-people) to exterminate them. Cosmos, king of the Moon, and his counsellor Cactus calm their people – science has proved that the Earth is uninhabited. With a horrendous crash, the shell crash-lands on a house and Vlan, Caprice and Microscope get out, as the "sélénites" hide. The three men observe what seems to be a desolate planet, and their mood blackens, since only apples remain for provisions. Some "sélénites" get up, and Cosmos reappears to ask the "terriens" where they have come from. Their insolent reply makes him condemn them to prison, but Cosmos's wife Popotte and daughter Fantasia arrive. It is Fantasia's birthday, and she asks her father to take pity on the prisoners and free them as her birthday present. Cosmos accepts and proposes that the "terriens" visit his palace.

7th scene: The glass palace

Cosmos and Cactus show Vlan, Caprice and Microscope the Moon's civil service. On the Moon, working for the king is not a happy job and if there are no candidates the fattest person is picked.

8th scene: The mother-of-pearl galleries

Caprice courts Fantasia, but she does not understand, not knowing what love is, since it does not exist on the Moon other than as a disease – when one wants to have a child, one asks oneself if there is an area of commerce in which it can prosper.

9th scene: The park

Caprice, despairing of princess Fantasia and her inability to love him, eats an apple. The princess, astonished by his absence, goes to look for him. Attracted by this fruit (unknown to her), she tastes it. Calling it a "charming gift that she formerly ate on the Earth", she immediately falls in love with Caprice, sending the palace into an uproar.

10th scene: The roaming shadows

As night falls, the scenery changes and phantom-like creatures appear through the creepers and suddenly lights shine in their heads, then everything disappears.

11th scene: Cosmos's gardens

In grand gardens with flowers and water features everywhere the stars and chimères dance.

=== Act 3 ===
12th scene: The consultation

The kingdom's doctors examine Fantasia, shut up in her chamber, mad with love. She escapes and finds Caprice. To save her, Caprice suggests making Cosmos amorous by giving him an apple-based drink. Due to her incurable sickness of love, Cosmos proposes to sell Fantasia, as is the habit on the Moon when a woman ceases to please. Caprice promises Fantasia that he will buy her.

13th scene: The women market

On the Moon, the women market is the equivalent of the stock market. Microscope is charged by Caprice with buying the princess and, visiting Quipasseparla ("Who Goes There", king of the stockmarket), he negotiates with him just in case the 'stock price' goes up. Quipasseparla does not accept and is intoxicated to prevent him from participating in the sale. Vlan and Caprice arrive, dressed as charlatans. They suggest an elixir that will, among other things, slim down fat people. This elixir is very precious, and only a king is worthy of it, so Cosmos is its happy beneficiary. Cosmos tastes it and panics, believing himself poisoned – in fact, they have made him discover alcohol. Quipasseparla wins Fantasia at the sale.

14th scene: The land of the paunchy

Quipasseparla and his harem arrive in the land of the paunchy where they stop at an inn. Microscope arrives, followed by Popotte who is, in turn, followed by Cosmos, who has fallen madly in love with her. Popotte does not return his love and so he had made her drink the elixir that will make her fall in love, but Microscope happens to be passing at that moment and she has instead fallen in love with him! Vlan and Caprice arrive in search of Fantasia. Vlan stops for dinner, whilst Caprice finds Fantasia again and flees with her. Furious at being in love and at being trumped by his wife, Cosmos arrives... The inn goes mad, Vlan and Microscope are unmasked despite their fake paunches. The royal guards go in pursuit of Caprice and Fantasia and bring them back. Quipasseparla renounces the princess. Winter immediately follows summer in this country and so they only get back to the capital under the snow.

15th scene: 50 degrees below zero

Grand ballet of the snowflakes: this scene gave rise to the popularity of snow dances, the most famous of which is that in The Nutcracker.

=== Act 4 ===
16th scene: The imprisonment of the apple-bearers

The Moon-women discover love, but King Cosmos does not hear of it. Vlan, Caprice and Microscope are brought before a court and condemned "to pass five years inside an extinct volcano, where they will be wholly deprived of any kind of nourishment".

17th scene: The glacier

Brought to the top of the volcano, they take their places in a basket with Cosmos to be lowered into the crater.

18th scene: The crater

Arriving at the bottom, Popotte cuts the cord, reproaching her husband for want to cause Microscope to perish. Fantasia is found to have stowed away in the basket, wanting to die with Caprice. In this desperate situation, Cosmos promises the prisoners their liberty if they can find a way out.

19th scene: The interior of the volcano

They search for a way out amidst rumbles and detonations. The volcano begins to erupt.

20th scene: The eruption

The scene fills with fire and smoke; Microscope is sent into space by an explosion; Vlan and Cosmos try to find a way out. Lava fills the stage.

21st scene: The rain of ash

Ash rains down, covering all the scenery.

22nd scene: The volcano's summit after the eruption
Caprice, Fantasia, Cosmos and Vlan lying on the ground, having fainted. Microscope has hidden in a crevice, and wakes them. Popotte rushes to them – they are saved.

23rd scene: Le clair de terre (The earth-light – a pun on clair de lune (moonlight))

The earth rises and shines on the stage as a aurora borealis – people rush on and sing the final chorus, greeting earth whose light shines through space.

== Musical numbers ==
- Overture

=== Act 1 ===
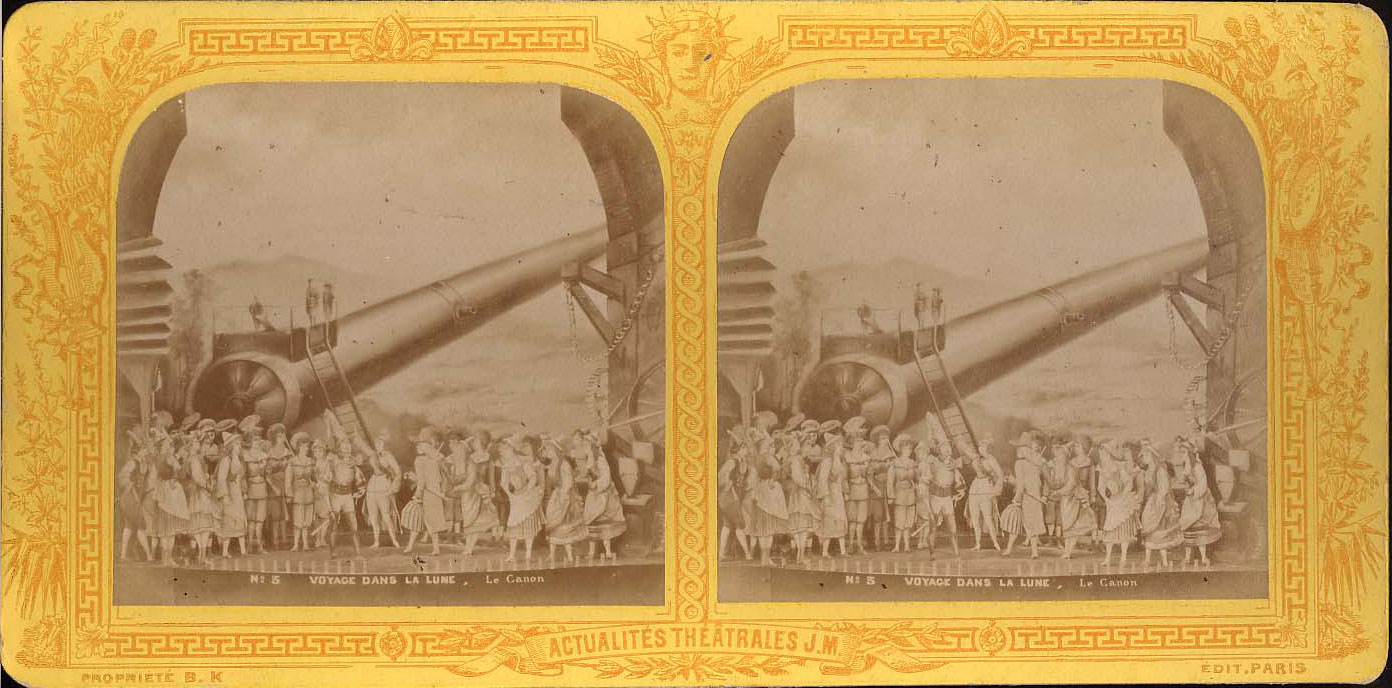
Le Canon (the canon) – one in a set of twelve stereo cards showing scenes from this work (c. 1885)

1. Chorus: 'Quelle splendide fête' (Chorus)
2. Couplets du roi Vlan: 'Vlan, Vlan, je suis Vlan' (Vlan, Chorus)
3. Chorus: 'Rataplan, rataplan' (Chorus, Vlan, Microscope), Couplets of prince Caprice: 'Ah ! j'en ai vu!' (Caprice, Chorus)
4. Romance de Caprice: 'Ô reine de la nuit' (Caprice)
5. Chorus of astronomers: 'Les cieux...' (Chorus TB)
6. Chorus of foundrymen and women: 'À l'ouvrage!' (Chorus)
7. Valse chantée/Rondeau: 'Monde charmant que l'on ignore' (Caprice)
8. Final: 'En route pour la lune!' (Chorus, Microscope, Vlan, Caprice), Chorus des artilleurs: 'Nous sommes les petits artilleurs' (Chorus, Vlan, Microscope, Caprice)
- Entr'acte

=== Act 2 ===
9. Chorus (off-stage): 'Ah !' (Chorus)
10. Chorus: 'C'est un point noir' (Chorus)
11. Rondo of the shell: 'Dans un obus qui fend l'air' (Caprice, Microscope, Vlan)
12. Couplets de Fantasia: 'Tu devais, le jour de ma fête' (Fantasia)
13. Chorus et marche: 'Salut à notre roi' (Chorus)
14. Entrée of the counsellors
15. Madrigal: 'Je regarde vos jolis yeux' (Caprice)
16. Morceau d'ensemble: 'Ne jamais rien faire' (Flamma, Chorus, Cosmos, Popotte, Microscope, Vlan)
17. Duo des pommes: 'Mon Dieu ! qu'ai-je ressenti là?' (Fantasia, Caprice)
18. Ballet des chimères
- Entr'acte

=== Act 3 ===
19. Chorus of the guards: 'Je suis le garde' (Chorus)
20. Couplets of the maids of honour: 'Elle disait: ah! viens encore' (Flamma, Chorus SA)
21. Ariette of the princess: 'Je suis nerveuse' (Fantasia)
22. Chorus of the market: 'C'est le marché' (Chorus)
23. Rondo de Quipasseparla: 'Le prince Quipasseparla' (Quipasseparla, Chorus)
24. Chorus: 'Ah ! quelle musique' (Chorus), Ronde des charlatans: 'Ohé, ohé petits et grands' (Caprice, Chorus)
25. Adieux des demoiselles d'honneur: 'Adieu notre compagne!' (Chorus, Fantasia, Cactus, Popotte, Quipasseparla), Scène de la vente
26. Final de la neige: 'Courons tous' (Chorus, Quipasseparla, Fantasia, Caprice, Popotte, Vlan, Cosmos)
27. Ballet of the snowflakes
- Entr'acte

=== Act 4 ===
28. Ronde des pommiers: 'Holà ! que chaque fillette' (Adja, Flamma, Chorus)
29. Chorus du tribunal: 'Voici le tribunal' (Chorus)
30. Le volcan (melodrama)
31. Clair de terre (finale): 'Nous te saluons, ô terre' (Chorus)

== Recordings ==
A complete studio recording, recorded in September 2021, was released in 2022 on the Bru Zane label. The singers are Violette Polchi, Sheva Tehoval, Matthieu Lécroart, Pierre Derhet, Raphaël Brémard, Marie Lenormand, Thibaut Desplantes, Ludivine Gombert and Christophe Poncet de Solages, with the Chœur et Orchestre national Montpellier Occitanie conducted by Pierre Dumoussau. Extracts from the opera are available on:

- Entre Nous: Celebrating Offenbach – David Parry – Opera Music 2007 (Ouverture, Ariette de la Princesse, Final de la neige, Ronde des Charlatans)
- Offenbach Romantique – Marc Minkowski – Archiv Produktion 2006 (Ballet des Flocons de neige)
- Can Can – Antonio de Almeida – Philips 1987 (Ouverture, Ballet des Flocons de neige)
- Offenbach au menu! – Quatuor gastronomique – Maguelone 1993 ("Duo des pommes")
- Recordings listed on operadis-opera-discography.org.uk
