= Christian Perrin =

French actor and singer

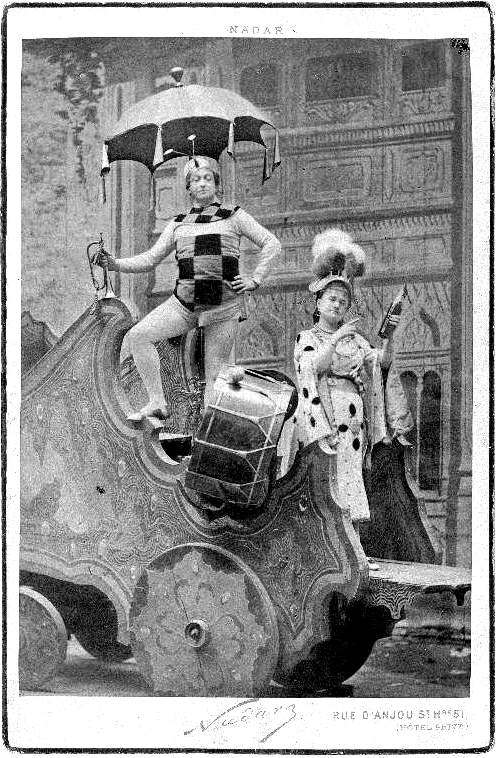
Christian (Vlan) with Zulma Bouffar (Prince Caprice) in Act III of Offenbach's Le voyage dans la lune

Christian Perrin, known by his stage-name Christian, was a French actor and singer in operetta, born in Paris, 1 January 1821, and died there in December 1889. He had a long and successful career in Paris from the 1850s up to his death.

== Life and career ==
After his beginnings in provincial theatres, Christian made his debut in the French capital at the Théâtre des Délassements-Comiques in April 1847. His career took off with roles in Claude le Riboteur, Polkette et Bamboche, Sur la gouttière, La Bouquetière des Innocents and in revue. He moved to the Théâtre des Folies-Dramatiques in 1849 and appeared in many plays, such as Les Filles en feu, Le Bal du sauvage, La Courte-paille, Le Festin de Balthazar, Le Postillon de Crèvecœur. From 1855 at the Théâtre des Variétés appearances included Furnished Apartment, Le Théâtre des Zouaves, Le Fils du Diable, L’Homme n’est pas parfait, Les Compagnons de la truelle and Les Mousquetaires du carnaval.

His first appearance for Offenbach was in the successful premiere of La Périchole in 1868 where he played Panatellas. Christian was popular with audiences through his reputation for his ad-libbing.

He featured in other revivals such as La Grande-Duchesse de Gérolstein and La belle Hélène (Agamemnon). He also appeared in the opérettes of Hervé such as Le mot de la fin and La veuve du Malabar. He appeared at the Théâtre de l'Odéon from 1870 to 1872 and then briefly at the Variétés before re-joining Offenbach at the Gaîté where he appeared in the premiere of Le Voyage dans la lune and in revised versions of Orphée aux Enfers (as Jupiter) and Geneviève de Brabant (Golo). When the 'Théâtre-Lyrique' opened at the Gaîté after Offenbach’s departure, he even undertook the opéra comique repertoire, including La poupée de Nuremberg, Giralda (Don Japhet), Les rendez-vous bourgeois and Le sourd (Doliban).

In January 1875 he was withdrawn from the revival of Les brigands after a complaint from a government minister to the theatre management that Christian had introduced the actor playing Gloria-Cassis in the tones of catholic liturgy.

Renowned for his constant wit, on the mirror of his dressing-room was pasted the inscription « Les raseurs sont priés de ne pas moisir ici » (Bores should not hang around here). According to Vanloo, his over-the-top performance as a sea-sick passenger in the vaudeville Coco at the Théâtre des Nouveautés in June 1878 led him to pun « Que diraient mes administrés s'ils me voyaient avoir le mal de maire ? » - as he was at the time the mayor of a commune near Chantilly.

The revival by Castellano of Le voyage dans la lune at the Théâtre du Châtelet in 1877 brought him back to operetta. From 1878 Christian rejoined the Variétés where he featured in new stage works – Le Tour du Cadran, Coup de foudre, Le Voyage en Suisse, Les Variétés de Paris, Mam'zelle Nitouche (as Château-Gibus), La Cosaque, Mam'zelle Gavroche, Mes Anciennes – alongside popular revivals, L'Homme n'est pas parfait, La belle Hélène (Calchas), La Grande-Duchesse de Gérolstein (Boum), Le Père de la débutante, Les brigands (Pietro), La princesse de Trébizonde (Cabriolo), and Barbe-bleue (Popolani).

Christian suffered a stroke at the Variétés on 20 November 1889 after a dress rehearsal for the revue Paris-Exposition and died shortly afterwards. His last words were apparently « I am dying just like Molière ».
