= Camille Doucet =

French poet and playwright (1812–1895)

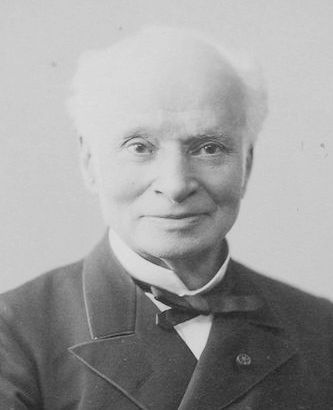
Camille Doucet

Camille Doucet (French: [kamij dusɛ]; 16 May 1812 in Paris – 1 April 1895 in Paris) was a French poet and playwright.

== Biography ==
Camille Doucet was born on 16 May 1812, in Paris, France.

He was a solicitor's clerk and notary, the secretary of Baron Fain in the cabinet of King Louis-Philippe, then the general manager of theater administration at the ministry of the Emperor's Household in 1863. Several times a candidate for the Académie Française, he was elected a member in 1865 and was the permanent secretary from 1876.

As Manager of Theater Administration, in 1867 Camille Doucet authorized the café-concerts "to use costumes, cross-dressing; to perform plays, to have interludes of dance and acrobatics"; these measures would support the further development of large venues, such as the Folies Bergère or the Olympia. Although Flaubert complained of him, he had a reputation for honesty and kindness; the memoirs of Sarah Bernhardt show that he supported her debuts at the Comédie-Française and gave her entry to the Odéon.

Camille Doucet was the author of several poems and numerous plays: vaudevilles, operas, comedies in verse. While some of them were met in their time with success, they are now largely forgotten.

Doucet died on 1 April 1895, at the age of 82, in Paris, France.

== Works ==
Theater

- A Young Man, a comedy-drama in three acts, in verse, Paris, théâtre de l'Odéon, 29 November 1841
- The Advocate of His Cause, a comedy in one act and in verse, Paris, théâtre de l'Odéon, 5 February 1842
- The Baron de Lafleur, or the Last Valets, a comedy in three acts and in verse, Paris, théâtre de l'Odéon, 13 December 1842
- Hunting Scoundrels, a comedy in three acts and in verse, Paris, Théâtre-Français, 27 February 1846
- The Last Banquet of 1847, comedy-revue in tables 3 and verse, Paris, théâtre de l'Odéon, 30 December 1847
- Enemies of the house, a comedy in three acts, in verse, Paris, Second Théâtre-Français, 6 December 1850
- The Forbidden Fruit, comedy in verse, Paris, Théâtre-Français, 23 November 1857
- The Consideration, a comedy in four acts in verse, Paris, Théâtre-Français, 6 November 1860

Collected Works

- Comedies in verse (1858) Volume 1: The Forbidden Fruit, Enemies of the House, Hunting Scoundrels. Volume 2: The Baron de Lafleur, The Advocate of his Cause, A Young Man and speech in verse.
- Complete Works (1874)

== Historical sources ==
- Octave Pradels, Thirty Years of the Café-Concert: Memories of Paulus (collected, 300 illustrations, 60 songs), Paris, Société d'édition et de publications, 460 p.
- The personal papers of Camille Doucet are kept in the National Archives in document 487AP
