= Ringtheater =

Theatre building in Vienna, 1874 to 1881

Coordinates: 48.215°N 16.363°E

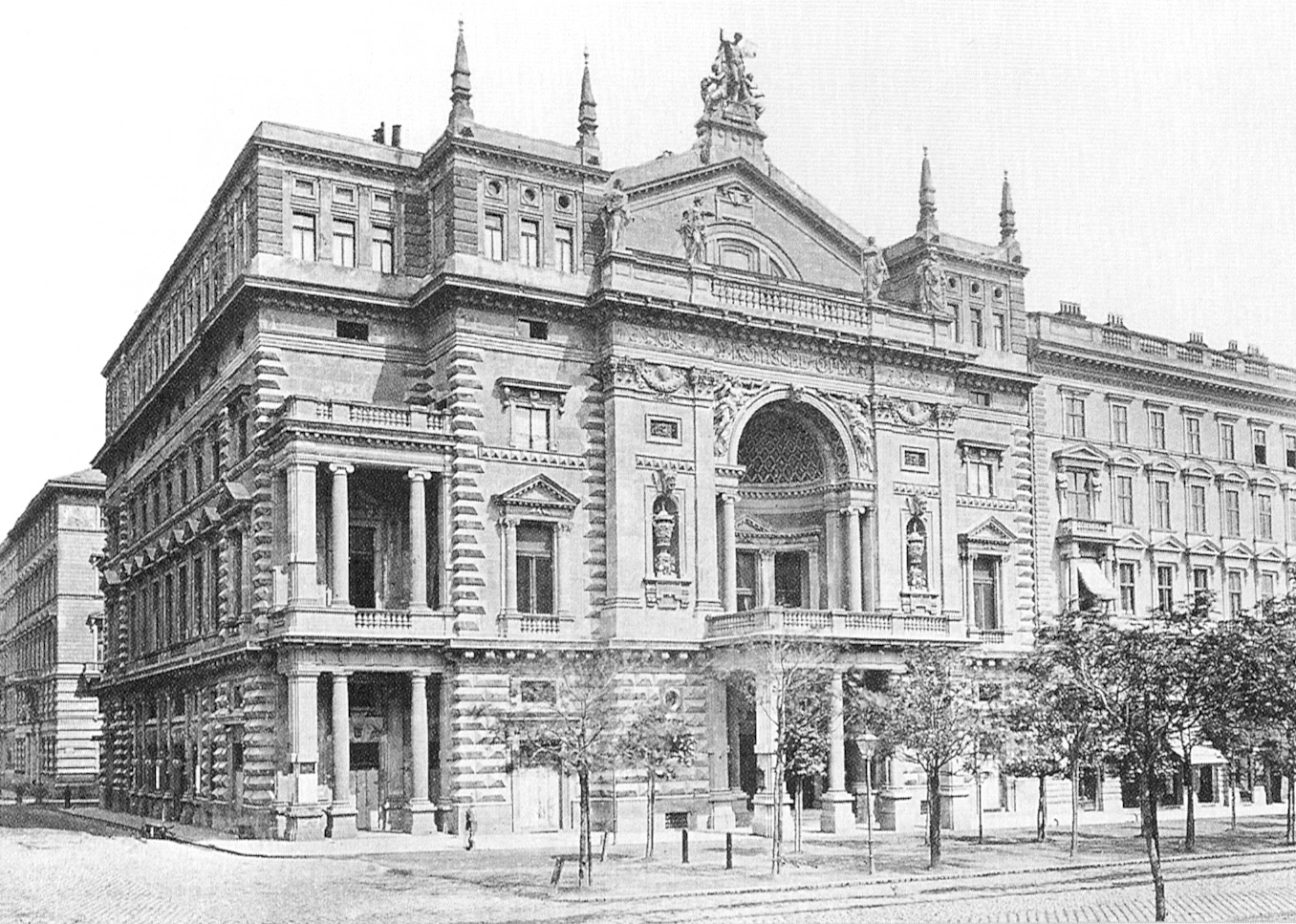
The Ringtheater in 1881

The Ringtheater was a popular theater in Vienna, Austria. In 1881, it was destroyed in the Ringtheater fire that killed 384 people. The site now houses the federal headquarters of police for Vienna.

== Construction ==
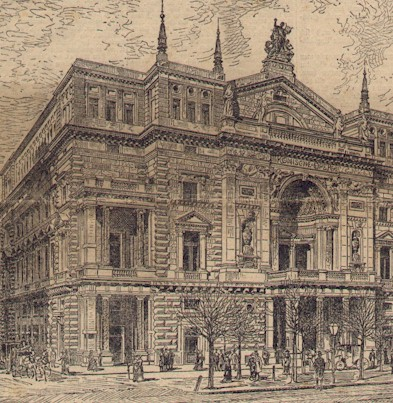
The Ringtheater from a drawing

The Ringtheater was built between 1872 and 1874 by Heinrich von Förster, following plans by Emil Ritter. It opened on January 17, 1874, under the direction of Albin Swoboda, Sr. as an 'Opéra Comique', antithetical to the "seriousness" of the Vienna State Opera, then called the Court Opera ('Hofoper'). Lighting was by gas. However, in September 1878, the focus was shifted to spoken plays, German and Italian opera and variety, and the name was changed to the "Ringtheater".

== The Ringtheater fire ==
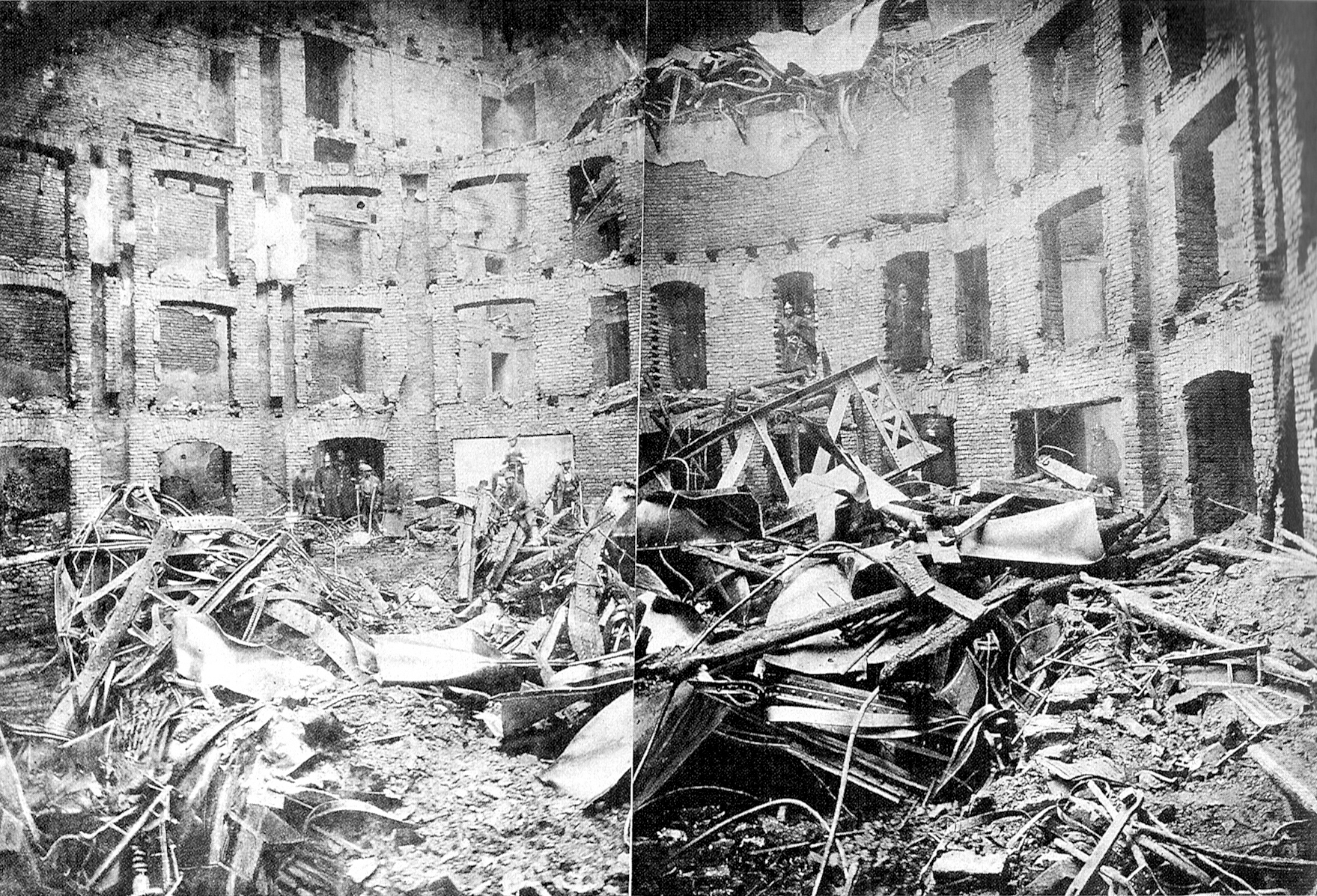
The ruins of the fire at the Ringtheater, 8 December 1881

Given that the footprint of the theatre was small—and the theatre was intended to hold an audience of 1700—the architect was forced to build high, but with disastrous consequences. On December 8, 1881, a fire broke out due to a problem with the gas lighting system, shortly before a performance of Les contes d'Hoffmann, and at least 384 people were killed. The following year, a new law was passed, regarding the outfitting and safety provisions, including safety curtains, outward-opening doors, and fireproofing of the set.

== The site after the fire ==
An apartment building called the Sühnhaus was built on the site of the Ringtheater out of Emperor Franz Joseph's private funds; it was a private residence, which supported worthy causes. This was badly damaged by fire in 1945 and eventually collapsed in 1951. Between 1969 and 1974, an office block was erected on the site, in which the federal headquarters for police in Vienna and the general inspectorate of the federal security guards, and police commandos are housed. The fire is commemorated on a plaque on the police building. The Attic style statues, which had stood on the pilasters, are now in the Pötzleinsdorfer Schlosspark.

== Sources ==
Most of the information in this article is taken from the German Wikipedia article.
