= Geneviève de Brabant (Offenbach) =

Opera by Jacques Offenbach

- Opéra bouffe by Jacques Offenbach
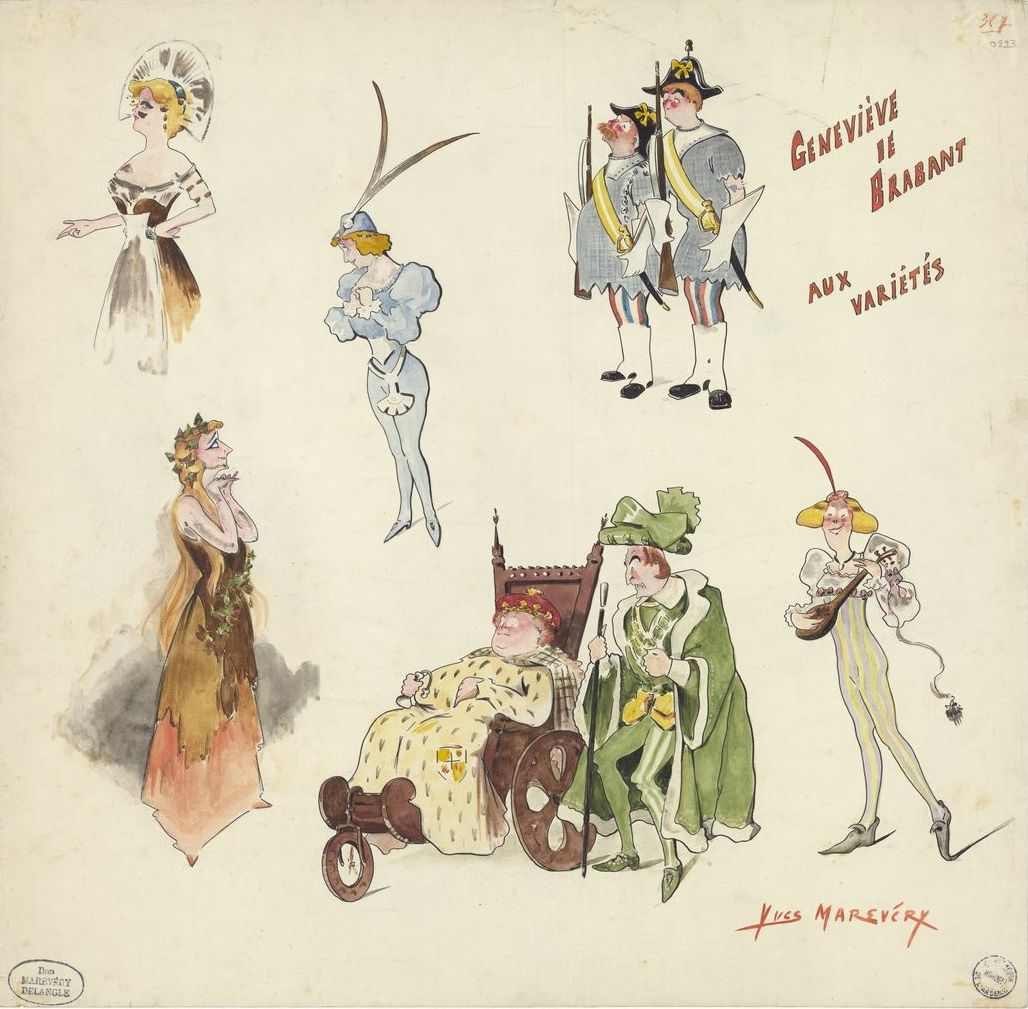
- Geneviève de Brabant characters as drawn by Yves Marevéry
- Librettist: Louis-Adolphe Jaime; Étienne Tréfeu
- Language: French
- Based on: Legend of Genevieve of Brabant.
- Premiere: 19 November 1859; Théâtre des Bouffes-Parisiens

Geneviève de Brabant (French pronunciation: [ʒənvjɛv də bʁabɑ̃]) is an opéra bouffe, or operetta, by Jacques Offenbach, first performed in Paris in 1859. The plot is based on the medieval legend of Genevieve of Brabant.

For the 1867 version two additional characters, men-at-arms, were added to Act 2 and given a comic duet, in English-speaking countries widely known as the "Gendarmes' Duet" or the "bold gendarmes", from H. B. Farnie's English adaptation. As well as being a popular performance piece, it formed the basis for the U.S. "Marines' Hymn".

== Performance history ==
The two-act French libretto was written by Louis-Adolphe Jaime and Étienne Tréfeu, and the opera was first staged at the Théâtre des Bouffes-Parisiens, Paris, on 19 November 1859. A new three-act version (in which the "Gendarmes' Duet" first appeared), revised by Hector-Jonathan Crémieux, was first given at the Théâtre des Menus-Plaisirs, Paris, on 26 December 1867. An expanded five-act version was devised for a production at the Théâtre de la Gaîté on 25 February 1875. A Paris revival in 1908 at the Théâtre des Variétés with Geneviève Vix in the title role ran for 58 nights.

Geneviève de Brabant was first performed in Vienna (Die schöne Magellone) and Berlin in 1861 and Brussels and Madrid in 1869.

The New York premiere was on 22 October 1868, and Farnie's version was first seen in London at the Philharmonic Theatre in Islington, produced by and starring Emily Soldene as Drogan, with Selina Dolaro in the title role, on 11 November 1871. The production ran for a year and a half, and revivals took place over the following decade with Soldene repeating her Drogan.

A reviewer for a 2003 production of the Keck edition in Paris (whose article was entitled 'Geneviève de Brabant, or Wagner and Weber side by side with Monty Python'), commented on how the work was a new direction for Offenbach into the world of knights and crusades, while still leading on a satire about power, significant love interest, and above all parodies of other composers. She noted the scene in Geneviève's boudoir with Drogan in the guise of Chérubin straight from The Marriage of Figaro, and the episode in the wild forest echoes the Wolf's Glen in Der Freischütz by Weber. Meyerbeer is parodied in the Act I finale with a pastiche of his style of dramatic recitative.

== Roles ==
Role	Voice type	Premiere cast, 19 November 1859, (Conductor: Jacques Offenbach)	Revised version in three acts Premiere cast 26 December 1867 (Conductor: Jacques Offenbach)	Revised version in five acts Premiere cast 25 February 1875 (Conductor: Jacques Offenbach)
Sifroid (1859) / Sifroy (1867, 1875) Duke of Curaçao, husband of Geneviève	tenor	Léonce	Gourdon	Habay
Golo	baritone	Désiré	Daniel Bac	Christian
Vanderprout, bourgmeister	tenor	–	Le Riche	Grivot
Charles Martel, King of France	bass	Guyot	Le Sage	Legrenay
Almanzor		Duvernoy	–	–
Le jeune Arthur		Bonnet	–	–
Pitou, Private gendarme	bass	–	Émile Gabel	Émile Gabel
Grabuge, Sergeant gendarme	bass	–	Paul Ginet	Scipion
Narcisse, poet	tenor	Desmonts	Lignel	Montaubry
Premier savant		Jean-Paul	–	–
Deuxième savant		Tautin	–	–
Péterpip		–	Leroy	Jean-Paul
Saladin		–	Destroges	–
Don Quichotte		–	Perron	–
Renaud de Montauban		–	Gustave	–
L'ermite du Ravin		–	Deschamps	Thérésa
Stockfish		–	–	Colleuille
Raoul		–	–	Meyronnet
Don Juan		–	–	Gaspard
Almaviva		–	–	Henry
Hercule		–	–	Chevalier
Othello		–	–	Gally
Barbe-Bleue		–	–	Victor
Roméo		–	–	Mallet
Hector		–	–	Alexandre fils
Hogier		–	–	Paulin
Arnold		–	–	Barsagol
Mathieu Laensberg	soprano	Lise Tautin	–	–
Gratioso (1859) / Drogan (1867, 1875)	soprano	Lise Tautin	Zulma Bouffar	Denise Matz-Ferrare
Le chevalier noir		Lise Tautin	–	–
Isoline (1859, 1867) / Biscotte (1875)	soprano	Lise Tautin	Vallière	Thérésa
La bohémienne	soprano	Lise Tautin	–	–
Geneviève	soprano	Mareshal	Baudier	Berthe Perret
Églantine (1859) / Brigitte (1867, 1875) Geneviève's confidant		Chabert	De Brigny-Varney	Angèle
Ugolin		Chabert	–	–
Lahire		Marie Cico	–	(M.) Henry
Clé de sol		Marie Cico	–	–
Blondette		Rose-Deschamps	–	–
Lancelot		Léone	–	Jules Vizentini
Irma		Naldy	–	–
Silvia		Lasserre	–	–
Edwige		Taffanel	–	–
Premier page		Kid	–	–
Deuxième page		Jeanne	–	–
Gilda		Fassio	–	–
Marthe		Lécuyer	–	–
Christine		–	Collas	E. Gilbert
Barberine		–	Collas	–
Gudule		–	Gourdon	Maury
Grudelinde		–	Gourdon	–
Faroline		–	Colombe	Julia H.
Irénée		–	Colombe	–
Houblonne		–	Rose Bruyère	Durieu
Griselis		–	Rose Bruyère	–
Dorothée		–	Louisa	Baudu
Yolande		–	Louisa	Yriart
Gretchen, Rodogune		–	A. Rolland	–
Rosemonde		–	Guyas	–
Madame Armide		–	Jacobus	Thérésa
Bradamante		–	Antoinette	–
Dulcinée		–	Lalouvière	–
Bibiane		–	–	Castello
Fideline		–	–	Davenay
Margotte		–	–	Godin
Charlotte		–	–	Albouy
Maguelonne		–	–	Gobert
Ursule		–	–	Vernet
Régine		–	–	Moralès
Nanny		–	–	Capet
Agathe		–	–	Roques
Chorus: Gentlemen, Knights, Councillors, Men and Women, Pages, Drummers, Kitchen boys, Musicians, Boatsmen, Bacchantes, etc.

== Synopsis (1867) ==
=== Act 1 ===
Place: the town of Curaçao in Brabant
Time: Around AD730

At evening in the main square, the burgomaster Van der Prout announces the imminent return from a pilgrimage to the monastery of Mount Poupard of Duke Sifroid’s party. The Duke, married to the beautiful Geneviève of Brabant, has fallen under a curse which prevents them from having any children. To find a cure, a competition is organized and is won by Drogan, a young baker, offering a magic pie. Secretly in love with Geneviève, Drogan asks for his reward to be made the page of Geneviève. Upon his return, the Duke tastes the magic pie, and feels good (Couplets de la poule).

In Geneviève’s apartments, Drogan implores her to allow him to accept him as her page, and confesses that it is he who has been singing beneath her window each night. He leaves as the Duke joins Geneviève, but after an interruption announcing the imminent arrival of Charles Martel, the effects of the pie on the Duke begin, in the form of a terrible bout of indigestion. As the Duke tries to assuage his digestion with a cup of tea, his counsellor Golo and his poet Narcisse arrive to carry out a plot to seize the crown. Golo and Narcisse tell him that Geneviève and Drogan have been witnessed in an embrace: the Duchess and the page must be put to death. But then Charles Martel demands entry to the palace (Boléro), asking Sifroid and his knights to catch the 8.05 train and join his crusade to Palestine. Sifroid condemns Geneviève, then sets off with his soldiers, by the northern railway.

=== Act 2 ===
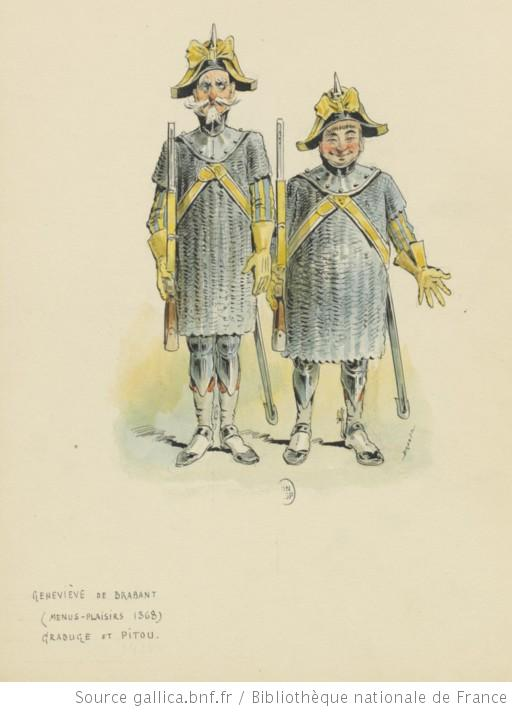
Grabuge and Pitou, "men-at-arms", Théâtre des Menus-Plaisirs, 1868 (Draner)

With the help of her servant Brigitte, Geneviève has escaped, along with Drogan, and they find themselves seven months later in a forest. As two men-at-arms approach, they hide. The Gascon and Flemish men-at-arms tell how they have been tasked by Golo to kill a noble lady. Golo and Van der Prout come on the scene and after despatching the men-at-arms to hunt down Geneviève (Golo having put about the story that Sifroid has been killed in the crusades) he calls up the hermit of the ravine. Drogan appears disguised as the statue of the hermit, and warns the men to abandon their pursuit as Sifroid is at the Château d'Asnières with Charles Martel. Even though he was married many years before, Golo threatens Geneviève with marriage. The statue of the hermit comes to life (Drogan) and sends the men-at-arms packing. Geneviève decides to feign death, Drogan takes a lock of her hair, and rushes off to reach the Duke.

Meanwhile, Charles Martel and Sifroid have ended their trip at the Château d'Asnières, where they make merry. Sifroid is taken with a masked lady, Isoline, who explains how her husband left her. Drogan arrives and announces the death of Geneviève. Sifroid decides to set off again with his retinue back to Curaçao to meet Golo – who, Isoline reveals, is the husband who abandoned her.

=== Act 3 ===
Geneviève and Brigitte are still in the forest with only a young hind for company. Drogan returns with four huntsmen, looking for Golo. Passing by on the way back from their 'crusade', Sifroid and Martel are stopped by the men-at-arms, but Geneviève recognises and vouches for her husband’s identity. Van der Prout swaps sides again and tells Sifroid that the treacherous Golo is planning to be crowned at a quarter to three. All continue back to Curaçao.

At the appointed hour Golo claims the crown, but he is denounced by Drogan and Sifroid has his crown restored. Isoline promises to punish her errant husband, and all ends well.

== Recordings ==
These include a radio broadcast from 1956 reissued on INA Mémoire vive conducted by Marcel Cariven featuring Denise Duval, Deva Dassy, Michel Hamel, Jean Giraudeau, Robert Massard and André Balbon, and one from 1970 also conducted by Cariven on Bourg with Annick Simon, Monique Stiot, Bernard Plantey and Jean-Christophe Benoît among the cast.
