= Hector Salomon =

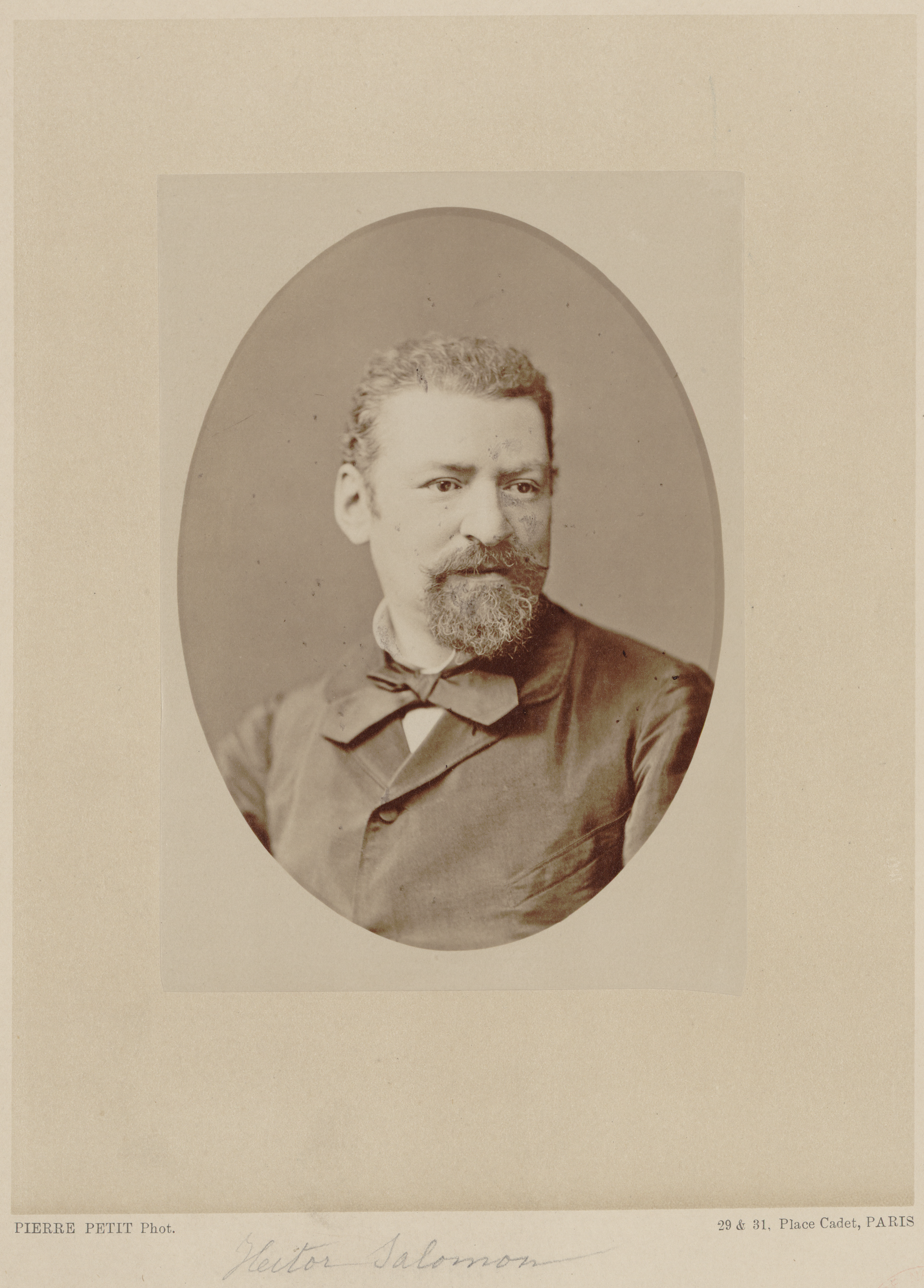
Hector Salomon

Hector Salomon (29 May 1838, Strasbourg – 28 June 1906, Paris) was a French composer. He was one of the Chefs du chant at the Paris Opera.

== Biography ==
Salomon received his musical training at the Imperial Conservatory of Paris from the age of 12. He was a student of Augustin Savard in music theory, of Émile Jonas and Antoine François Marmontel in piano, of François Bazin in harmony, and of Fromental Halévy in composition.

After completing his training, he became a piano accompanist at the Théâtre des Bouffes-Parisiens, and then at the Théâtre Lyrique from 1860.

In 1870, he became a state employee, being appointed second conductor of the Paris Opera Chorus.

== Works ==
- 1865, Le Mariage de Don Lope, comic opera in 1 act, lyrics by Jules Barbier, piano and vocal score reduced by Hector Salomon. Paris. In-8°, 130 p. Online version on Gallica [ archive ]
- 1866, Les dragées de Suzette, comic opera in one act, with a libretto by Jules Barbier and Jules Delahaye, performed for the first time at the Théâtre-Lyrique on 13 June 1866.
- 1877, L'aumônier du régiment, comic opera in one act, on a libretto by Adolphe de Leuven and Jules-Henri Vernoy de Saint-Georges, performed for the first time at the Théâtre national lyrique, on 13 September 1877.
- 1886, Bianca Capello, opera in 5 acts, on a libretto by Jules Barbier, performed for the first time at the Royal Theatre of Antwerp on 1 February 1886.
- ...., Salut printemps, salut aurore, melody on a poem by Paul Collin.
