= Jack =

Jack may refer to:

== Places ==
- Jack, Alabama, US, an unincorporated community
- Jack, Kansas, US, a ghost town in Kansas
- Jack, Missouri, US, an unincorporated community
- Jack County, Texas, a county in Texas

== People and fictional characters ==
- Jack (given name), a male given name, including a list of people and fictional characters with the name
- Jack (surname), including a list of people with the surname
- Jack the Ripper, an unidentified British serial killer active in 1888
- Wolfman Jack (1938–1995), a stage name of American disk jockey Robert Weston Smith
- Spring-heeled Jack, a creature in Victorian-era English folklore
- Jack (hero), an archetypal Cornish and English hero and stock character

== Animals and plants ==
=== Fish ===
- Carangidae generally, including:
  - Almaco jack
  - Amberjack
  - Bar jack
  - Black jack (fish)
  - Crevalle jack
  - Giant trevally or ronin jack
  - Jack mackerel
  - Leather jack
  - Yellow jack
- Coho salmon, males called "jacks"
- Esox (northern pike), young called "jacks"
- "Jackfish" or "jack", a western Canadian name for northern pike

=== Mammals ===
- Jack (baboon), who was the assistant to a disabled railway signalman in South Africa
- Jack (cat), a Norwegian forest cat who was lost by American Airlines baggage handlers
- Jack or jackass, a male donkey (Equus africanus)

=== Plants ===
- Jack (tree) (Mangifera caesia), a relative of the mango
- Jack pine (Pinus banksiana), a North American conifer
- Jackfruit (Artocarpus heterophyllus)

== Arts, entertainment, and media ==
=== Films ===
- Jack (1925 film), a French silent film directed by Robert Saidreau
- Jack (1996 film), starring Robin Williams
- Jack (2004 film), starring Anton Yelchin and Stockard Channing
- Jack (2013 film), a television film starring Rick Roberts and Sook-Yin Lee
- Jack (2014 film), a German film
- Jack (2015 film), an Austrian film
- Jack (2025 film), an Indian film

=== Games ===
- Jack (playing card), the lowest-ranking face card in some types of deck
- Jack, a target ball used in games such as bowls
- Jack, a playing piece used in the children's game called jacks

=== Literature ===
- Jack (Daudet novel), 1876, by Alphonse Daudet
- Jack (Lundell novel), 1976, by Ulf Lundell
- Jack (Homes novel), 1990, by A. M. Homes
- Jack (Robinson novel), 2020, by Marilynne Robinson

=== Periodicals ===
- Jack (Italian magazine), an Italian-language technology magazine
- Jack (magazine), an English-language British lad mag

=== Music ===
==== Artists and groups ====
- Jack (band), a British independent pop group signed to the Too Pure label
- Jack & Jack, an American pop-rap duo
- Jack (singer) (born 1997), a Vietnamese pop star

==== Albums ====
- Jack (album), a 2010 studio album by John Farnham
- Jack (EP), 1991, by Moose
- Jack, 1984, by Bone Orchard
- J.A.C.K., a 2013 studio album by Forever the Sickest Kids

==== Songs ====
- "Jack" (song), 2013, by Breach
- "Jack" (1980), a B-side song to "Tell The Children" by Sham 69 on the album Kings & Queens
- "Jack" (1984), a song and single by Bone Orchard
- "Jack" (2001), by Iced Earth from their album Horror Show (2001)
- "Jack" (1983), a song and single by Machinations
- "Jack" (1983), a song and single by Mighty Gabby
- "Jack", by Pixie Lott from the Turn It Up (2009) album
- "Jack" (2023), by Hardy from The Mockingbird & the Crow
- "The Jack", by AC/DC originally on T.N.T. (1975)

=== Television ===
- Jack (TV series), a 3D-animated series broadcast by TVOntario
- Jack TV, a general entertainment channel in the Philippines (cable)

=== Other uses in arts, entertainment, and media ===
- Jack FM, a radio format and brand

== Military ==
- Jack (flag), a national maritime flag flown by warships, e.g.:
  - Union Jack
- Jack, the Allied code-name of the Japanese Mitsubishi J2M fighter of World War II

== Technology ==
=== Computing and software ===
- Jack (CAD software), a 3-D ergonomics and human factors CAD package
- Jack (human modeling), a human modeling and simulation system
- JACK Audio Connection Kit, a computer sound server
- JACK Intelligent Agents, a multi-agent platform written in Java

=== Electrical interfaces ===
- Electrical connector, or "wall jack", a socket (often panel-mounted) intended to accept a plug
- Phone connector (audio), commonly known as "audio jack", or "jack plug", or "phone jack"
- Registered jack, a standardized telecommunication network interface for connecting voice and data equipment

=== Mechanical tools ===
- Jack (device), used to lift heavy objects
  - Jackscrew, a device used to support heavy objects at various heights
  - Pallet jack, a device with two forks used to lift and move pallets; the powered version is known as a forklift
  - Strand jack, used in construction and engineering, commonly capable of lifting up to hundreds of tonnes
- Boot jack, a device for removing boots
- Jack plane, a tool for smoothing wood
- Roasting jack, a device for turning a spit

== Other uses ==
- Jack Box, the mascot of Jack in the Box restaurants
- Cracker Jack and Cracker Jack'D, snack foods with the fictional Sailor Jack as a mascot
- Jack Daniel's, a Tennessee whiskey distillery, whose product is sometimes referred to as "Jack"
- Jack of plate or jack, a type of armor
- Jack's (store), a defunct British discount supermarket chain owned by Tesco
- Monterey Jack, a variety of cheese
- Quarter-jack or jack, an animated figure which strikes the bell of a clock
- Yukon Jack (liqueur), a Canadian whisky with honey
- Jack Tar or "jack", a term for a sailor

== See also ==
- Hijacking (disambiguation)
- Jacks (disambiguation)
- Jacking (disambiguation)
