= JAC =

JAC or Jac may refer to:

== Businesses ==
- JAC Liner, a Philippine bus company
- JAC Motors, a Chinese automobile manufacturer
- Japan Air Commuter airline (ICAO: JAC)

== Organizations ==
- JAC (football club), a football club from Libreville, Gabon
- Japanese Alpine Club
- Jewish Anti-Fascist Committee, a Soviet political organization
- Jharkhand Academic Council, government agency of Jharkhand, India
- Joint Action Committee for Political Affairs, pro-Israel organization in the United States
- Joint Analysis Center, US intelligence agency
- Joint Astronomy Centre, an observatory telescope operator
- Judicial Appointments Commission, of England and Wales
- Jump Around Carson, a public transit operator in Carson City, Nevada
- Junta de Aviación Civil, the civil aviation authority of the Dominican Republic
- Men's Hockey Junior Africa Cup, international under-21 field hockey tournament organised by the African Hockey Federation.
- Joint Aviation Command, British Armed Forces helicopter units organisation

== Other uses ==
- J.A.C., an album from Austrian band Tosca
- Jac Naylor, a fictional character in Holby City
- Jacana railway station, Melbourne
- Castra of Jac, a fort in the Roman province of Dacia
- Jakaltek language (ISO 639-3: jac)
- John Abbott College, Sainte-Anne-de-Bellevue, Quebec, Canada
- Journal of Ancient Civilizations, a journal for the history, archaeology and philology of ancient cultures
- Jackson Hole Airport, Wyoming, U.S. (IATA: JAC)
- A village in Creaca commune, Sălaj County, Romania
- The Jac, a nickname for the Liverpool music venue The Jacaranda, U.K.

== People ==
- Jac Arama, British poker player
- Jac Caglianone, American baseball player
- John Jones (Jac Glan-y-gors), Welsh poet John Jones
- Jac Holzman, American music executive
- Jac Jagaciak, Polish model
- Jac Morgan, Welsh rugby union player
- Jacques Nasser, Australian businessman known as "Jac The Knife"
- Jac Nellemann, Danish motorsport racer
- Jac Rayner, British author
- Jac Schaeffer, American screenwriter and director
- Jac. P. Thijsse, Dutch botanist
- Jacobus van Looy, Dutch painter known as Jac
- Jac van Steen, Dutch music conductor
- Jac Venza, American TV producer
- F. P. Jac, Danish poet
- Josh Addo-Carr Australian rugby league player

== See also ==
- Telangana Joint Action Committee (TJAC), organisation which sought the creation of the Telangana state in India
- Jack (disambiguation)
- JACS (disambiguation)
- JAX (disambiguation)
