= Jacking =

Jacking may refer to:

- Jacking, use of a jack, a mechanical lifting device
- Jacking (dance), a freestyle dance move

== See also ==
- Hijacking
- Carjacking, a robbery in which a motor vehicle is taken over
- Flag jacking, the use of a foreign flag to disguise one's own nationality
- Ice jacking, when water permeates a confined space within a structural support or geological formation
- Jacking off, slang for masturbation
- Jacking gear, a device placed on the main shaft of an engine or the rotor of a turbine
- Jackknifing, the folding of an articulated vehicle
- Juice jacking, a theoretical type of compromise of electronic devices while charging
- Mud jacking, used to lift concrete slabs
- Oxide jacking, or rust jacking, the expansive force of rusting
