= Ice heave =

- Ice shove, a heave of ice from an ocean or large lake onto the shore.
- Frost heaving, an upwards swelling of soil during freezing conditions caused by an increasing presence of ice as it grows towards the surface.
