= Ivu =

Ivu or IVU may refer to:

- Ice shove, a surge of ice from large bodies of water onto the shore
- International Vegetarian Union, a non-profit organisation
- Intravenous urogram
- Puerto Rico Sales and Use Tax (Spanish: Impuesto sobre ventas y uso)
- Ivu or Eve, a character from the manga Black Cat
