= Ice surge =

- Surge (glacier), an event where a glacier can advance substantially,
- Ice shove, a surge of ice from an ocean or large lake onto the shore.
