= Jacks =

Jacks may refer to:

== People with the surname ==
- Al Jacks (born c. 1935), American professor and college football coach
- Banita Jacks, American convicted murderer
- Brian Jacks (born 1946), British judoka
- Digby Jacks (1945–2011), British trade union official
- George Jacks (born 1946), English association football player
- Harry Jacks (1908–1994), New Zealand soldier, plant pathologist, lecturer and forester
- James Jacks (1947–2014), American film producer
- Katrina Jacks (1986–2010), Welsh rower and chemical engineer
- L. P. Jacks (1860–1955), English educator, philosopher, and Unitarian minister
- Onimim Jacks, Nigerian lawyer
- Robert Jacks (1943–2014), Australian painter, sculptor and printmaker
- Ron Jacks (born 1948), Canadian swimmer
- Sam Jacks (1915–1975), Canadian sports inventor
- Susan Jacks (1948–2022), Canadian singer–songwriter
- Terry Jacks (born 1944), Canadian singer, songwriter, record producer and environmentalist
- Tex Jacks (born 1995), British actor
- Tyler Jacks, American biologist
- Will Jacks (born 1998), England cricketer
- William Jacks (1841–1907), British ironmaster, author, and politician

== Other uses ==
- Knucklebones, a game of ancient origin, also known as "jacks"
- Jacks (band), a 1960s Japanese psychedelic rock band
- Jacks Mountain, a ridge in Pennsylvania, United States
- Jacks River, a river in the Cohutta Wilderness Area, Georgia, United States
- Jack's, a fast food restaurant chain in the United States
- Jack's (store), a value retail chain in the United Kingdom, part of the Tesco Group
- South Dakota State Jackrabbits, the athletic program of South Dakota State University

== See also ==
- Jack (disambiguation)
- Jax (disambiguation)
