= John Singleton (Australian entrepreneur) =

Australian entrepreneur (born 1941)

John Singleton AM
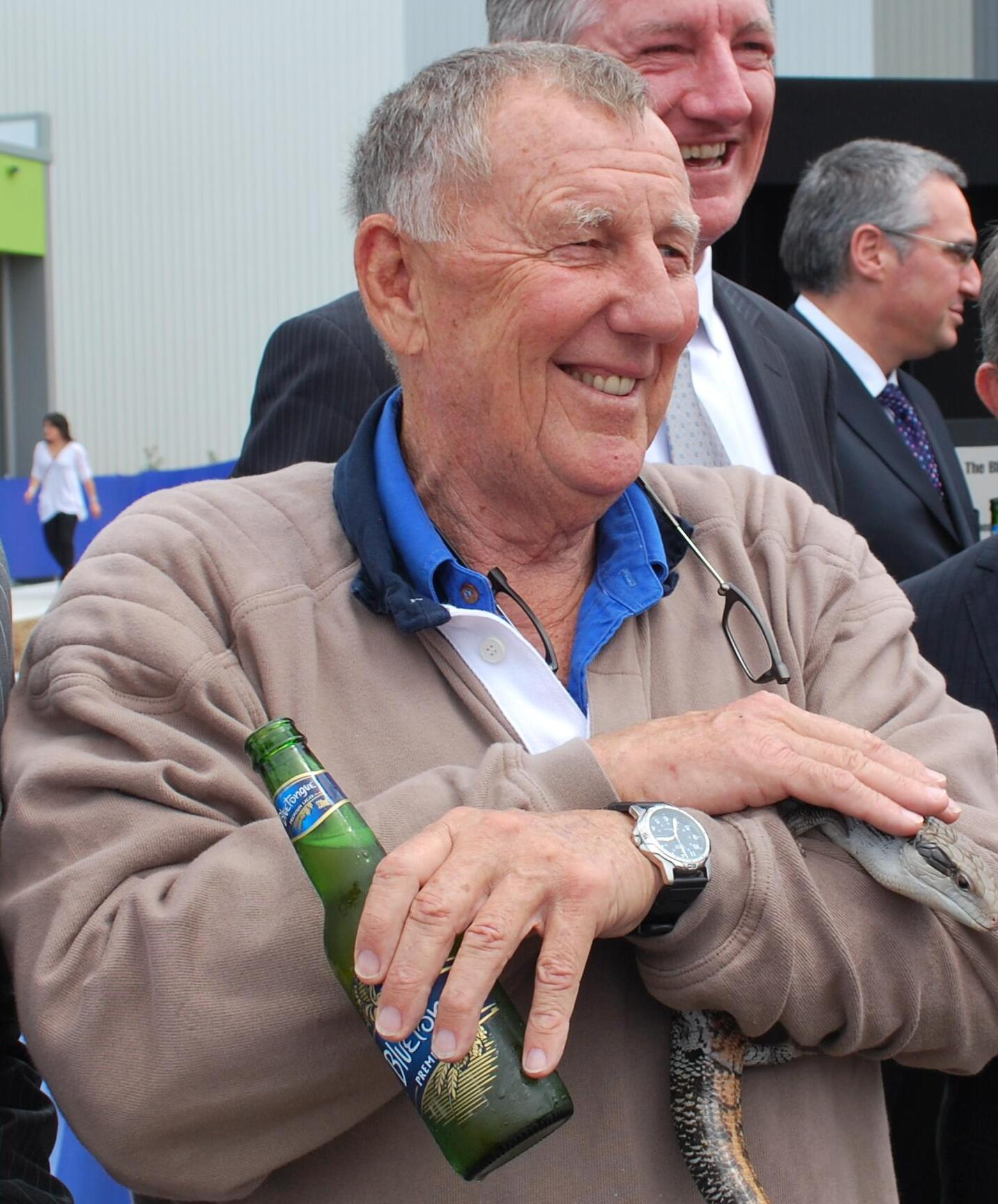
- Singleton in 2010
- Born: 9 November 1941 (age 85); Enfield, New South Wales, Australia
- Education: Fort Street High School
- Occupation: Entrepreneur
- Years active: 1958–present
- Spouses: Margaret Wall; Maggie Eckardt; Belinda Green; Liz Hayes; Jennifer Murrant; Julie Martin; Sarah Warry
- Children: 8
- Awards: Member of the Order of Australia; Australian Sports Medal

John Desmond Singleton AM (born 9 November 1941) is an Australian entrepreneur. He built his success and wealth in the advertising business in Australia in the 1970s and 1980s, and later also had diverse investment interests in radio broadcasting, publishing and thoroughbred breeding and racing.

== Early life ==
Singleton was born in the Sydney suburb of Enfield and educated at Fort Street High School.

== Advertising career ==
Singleton commenced a career in advertising in 1958 as a mail boy in the Sydney office of J. Walter Thompson. In 1963, he took a creative role at Berry Currie Advertising, and later attaining the role of Creative Director. In 1968, together with his Art Director partner Dunc McAllan, he started his own agency in Sydney and the pair soon teamed-up with Rob Palmer and Mike Strauss who had an existing small Melbourne shop with media buying accreditation to start Singleton, Palmer and Strauss, McAllan (SPASM) which opened with offices in Sydney and Melbourne.

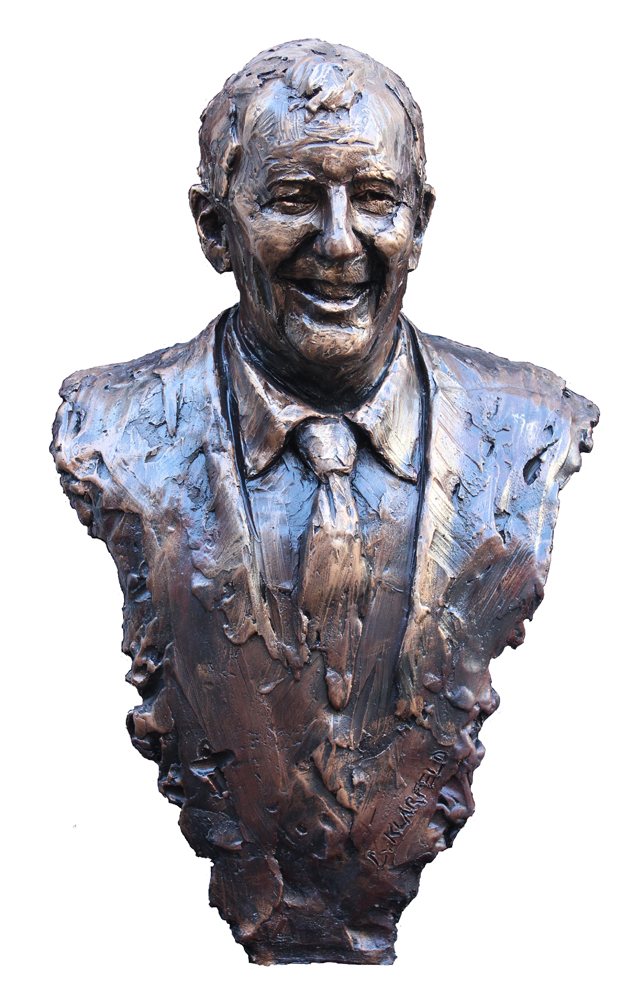
Life-size bronze statue of John Singleton by sculptor Linda Klarfeld

SPASM (and Singleton in particular) are notable in the history of Australian advertising for embracing an ocker voice in their communications at a time when multi-national agency groups were making their presence felt with the advent of strategic planning and British or American-imitating tones of voice. SPASM's clients were largely local Sydney retailers and rather than using polished voices, Singleton's ads embraced the tone of working-class man. A successful campaign was created for the wholesalers David Holdings. The voice-over screamed the retailer's prices before the irritating catchphrase "Where do you get it?". Similar "low-brow" approaches were taken for Jax Tyres "Jax the ripper Tyremen with the deals" and for Hudsons Timber and Hardware using a toothless old handyman spruiking "udsons with a haitch". Critics derided this style as ocker advertising but it would pave the way for the later success of the laconic and self-deprecating style of local Australian advertising such as that created by Mojo in the 1980s.

In 1973, Singleton and his partners sold SPASM to Doyle Dane Bernbach and Singleton for a time was managing director of DDB's Australian operations. Working for a large multi-national with overseas owners was a challenge for Singleton and he left the business in 1977, triggering a long non-compete provision in his contract. In 1985 Singleton started up again on his own with "John Singleton Advertising". Sydney stockbroker Rene Rivkin bought a silent-holding in the agency during its development in the 1980s. Singleton developed close ties with the Australian Labor Party and created the advertising for Bob Hawke's successful 1987 election campaign. In 1995 Singleton Group Limited was listed on the Australian Securities Exchange. In February 2002, it was renamed STW Communications Group.

Along the way, Singleton acquired personal stakes in ventures including the 1990 buy-out of the Ten Group TV network from receivership and an acquisition in 2000 of Indonesia's No 3 network SCTV. These personal holdings in addition to the success and growth STW Group interests enabled Singleton to amass a massive personal fortune.

In 1994, Singleton purchased 2CH from AWA followed in 1996 by 2GB from the Wesley Mission. Having been merged into Macquarie Radio, in 2019 Singleton sold his shareholding to Nine Entertainment.

== Honours and awards ==
In 1994, Singleton was appointed as a Member of the Order of Australia for service to the community through his own personal support and fundraising activities more broadly. In 2000, Singleton was awarded the Australian Sports Medal. In 2009, Singleton was included in the inaugural twelve inductees to Ad News magazine's, Australian Advertising Hall of Fame.

== Personal life ==
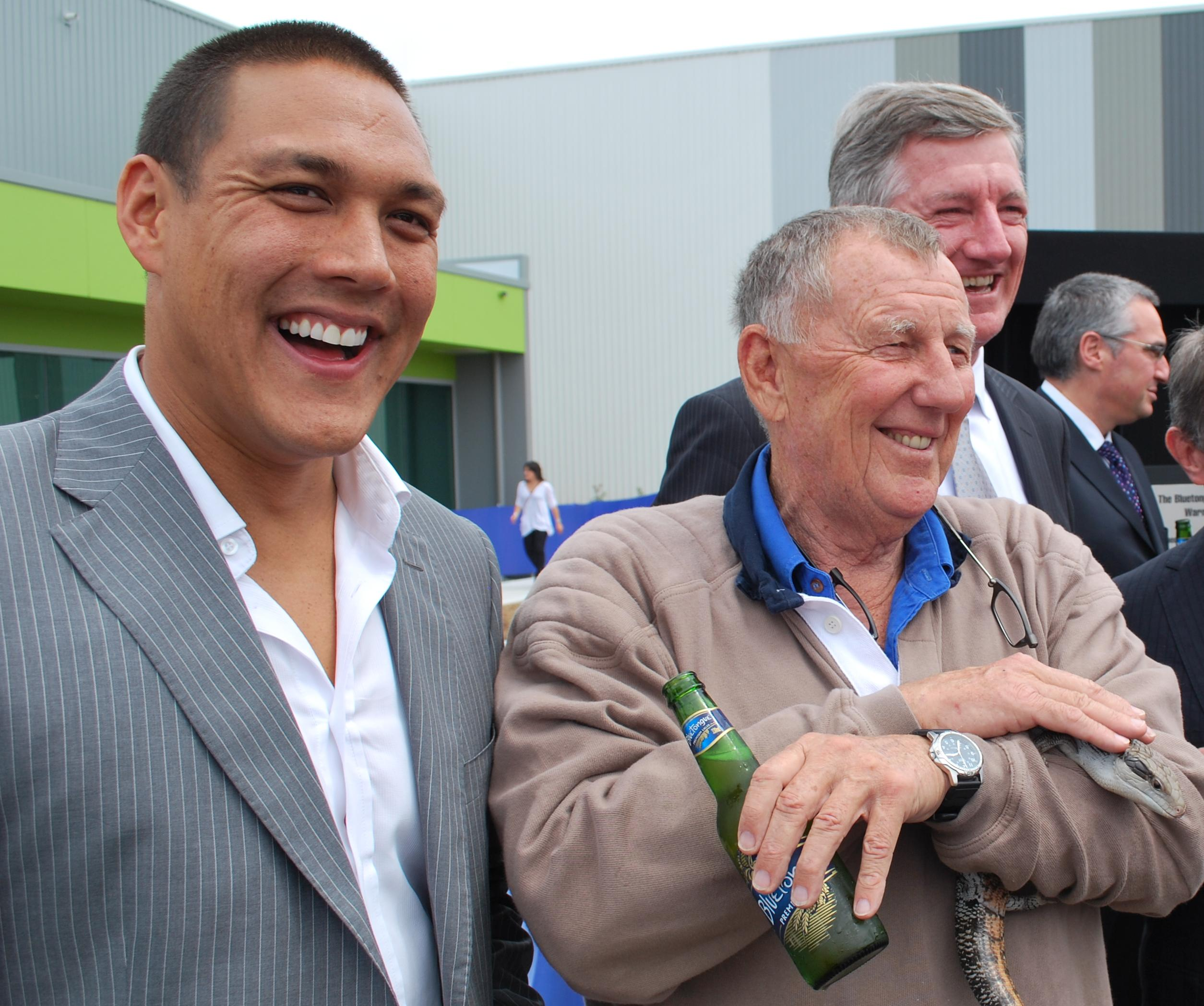
Singleton (right) and Australian Olympic swimmer Geoff Huegill (left) in 2010

Singleton has eight children from seven marriages. He has been married to Margaret Wall, Maggie Eckardt, Belinda Green, Liz Hayes, Jennifer Murrant – de facto, Julie Martin, and Sarah Warry. His daughter Dawn was killed in April 2024 during the mass knife attack at Westfield Bondi Junction shopping mall.

=== Net worth ===
| Year | Financial Review Rich List | | Forbes Australia's 50 Richest | |
| Year | Rank | Net worth (A$) | Rank | Net worth (US$) |
|---|---|---|---|---|
| 2010 | | $230 million | | |
| 2011 | | | | |
| 2012 | | | | |
| 2013 | | $355 million | | |
| 2014 | | | | |
| 2015 | | | | |
| 2016 | 155 | $416 million | | |
| 2017 | | $450 million ▲ | | |
| 2018 | 161 ▲ | $534 million ▲ | | |
| 2019 | 145 ▲ | $670 million ▲ | | |
| 2020 | 142 ▲ | $728 million ▲ | | |
| 2021 | 147 ▼ | $731 million ▲ | | |
| 2022 | 170 ▼ | $768 million ▲ | | |
| 2023 | 171 ▼ | $820 million ▲ | | |
| 2024 | | $800 million ▼ | | |
| 2025 | 196 | $776 million ▼ | | |

Legend
| Icon | Description |
|---|---|
| Steady | Has not changed from the previous year |
| ▲ | Has increased from the previous year |
| ▼ | Has decreased from the previous year |
