= Ice dune =

Dune made of ice

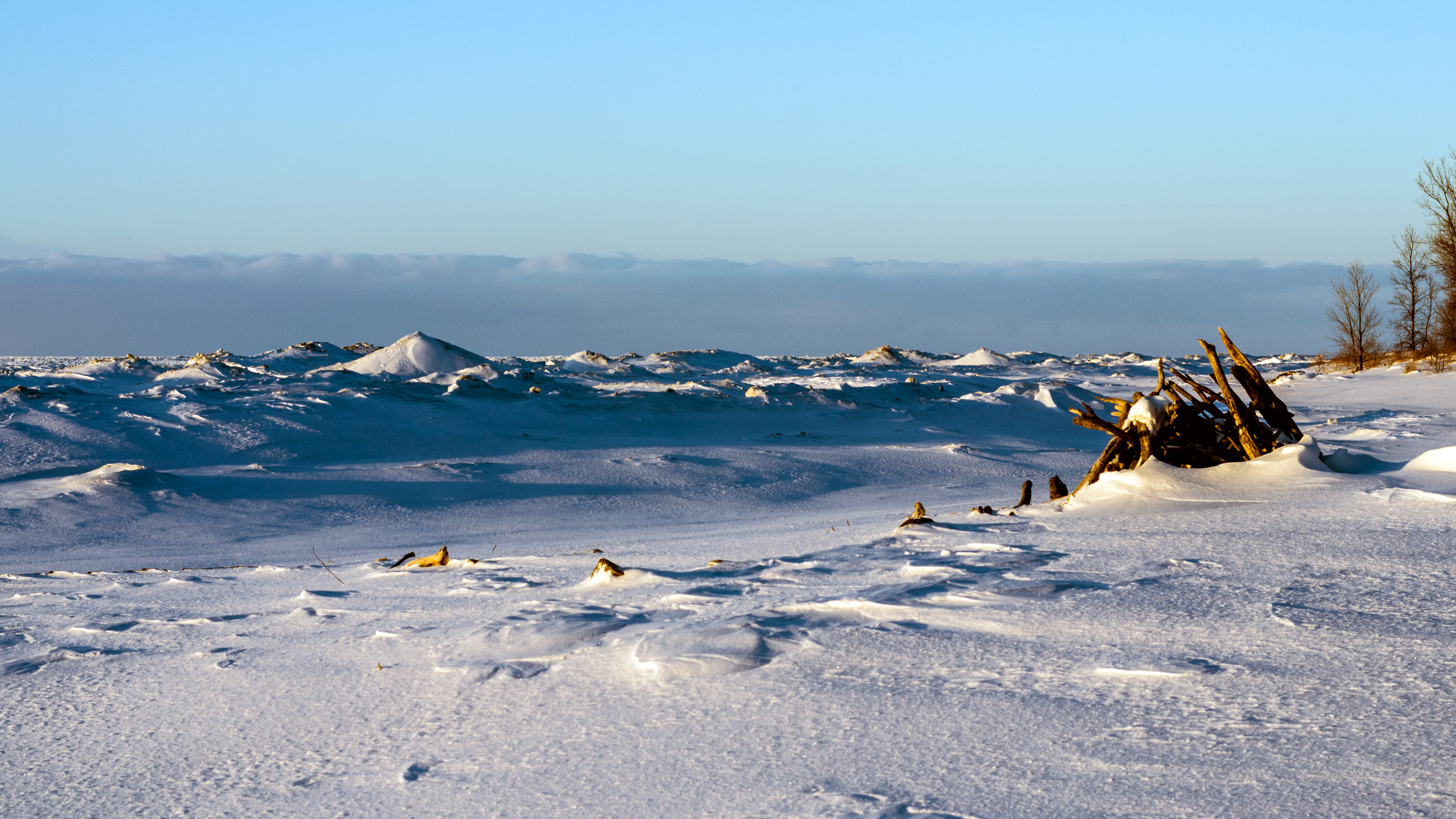
Ice Dunes at Presque Isle State Park on Lake Erie

An ice dune, also called an ice ridge or an ice foot, is a formation of ice that accumulates on the shores of many arctic beaches and is also common along the shores of the Great Lakes during the winter. Ice dunes are not to be confused with ice shoves, which accumulate on bodies of water then push their way on shore, carrying sediment with them and deforming the shoreline.

== Cause ==
An ice dune is produced by ice washing ashore, snowfall, and the gradual freezing of wave spray that accumulates on to the shore. They form when the air temperature is below freezing and the water temperature is near freezing. Ice dunes are commonly at least six feet (1.8 m) tall, but the dune's size depends on the beach and the weather. The tidal range, the storminess of the water and the topography of the beach all can affect the size of the dunes. The dunes will also stop forming if the body of the water they border freezes over, which often happens on Lake Erie. Ice dunes will usually break up in the early stages of spring thaw.

== Effects ==
Ice dunes are important in formations, such as sandspits and sand isthmuses, that could be eroded by wave action. An example of a Great Lakes sandspit is Presque Isle State Park in Erie, Pennsylvania. When the dunes form, they form a barrier between the waves and the shore and prevent the waves from reaching the shore, keeping the sand in place.

Because of the way ice dunes form, they are inherently weak and filled with cracks and air pockets. People who venture out onto the dunes sometimes will fall through. If the dune extends out over the water, persons who do this can fall through the dune and into the freezing water underneath; if this happens, hypothermia and death by drowning are urgent, immediate dangers.

== See also ==
- Ice shove

== Sources ==
- French, Hugh M (2007). The Periglacial Environment. Hoboken, NJ: John Wiley & Sons. ISBN 978-0-470-86588-0.
