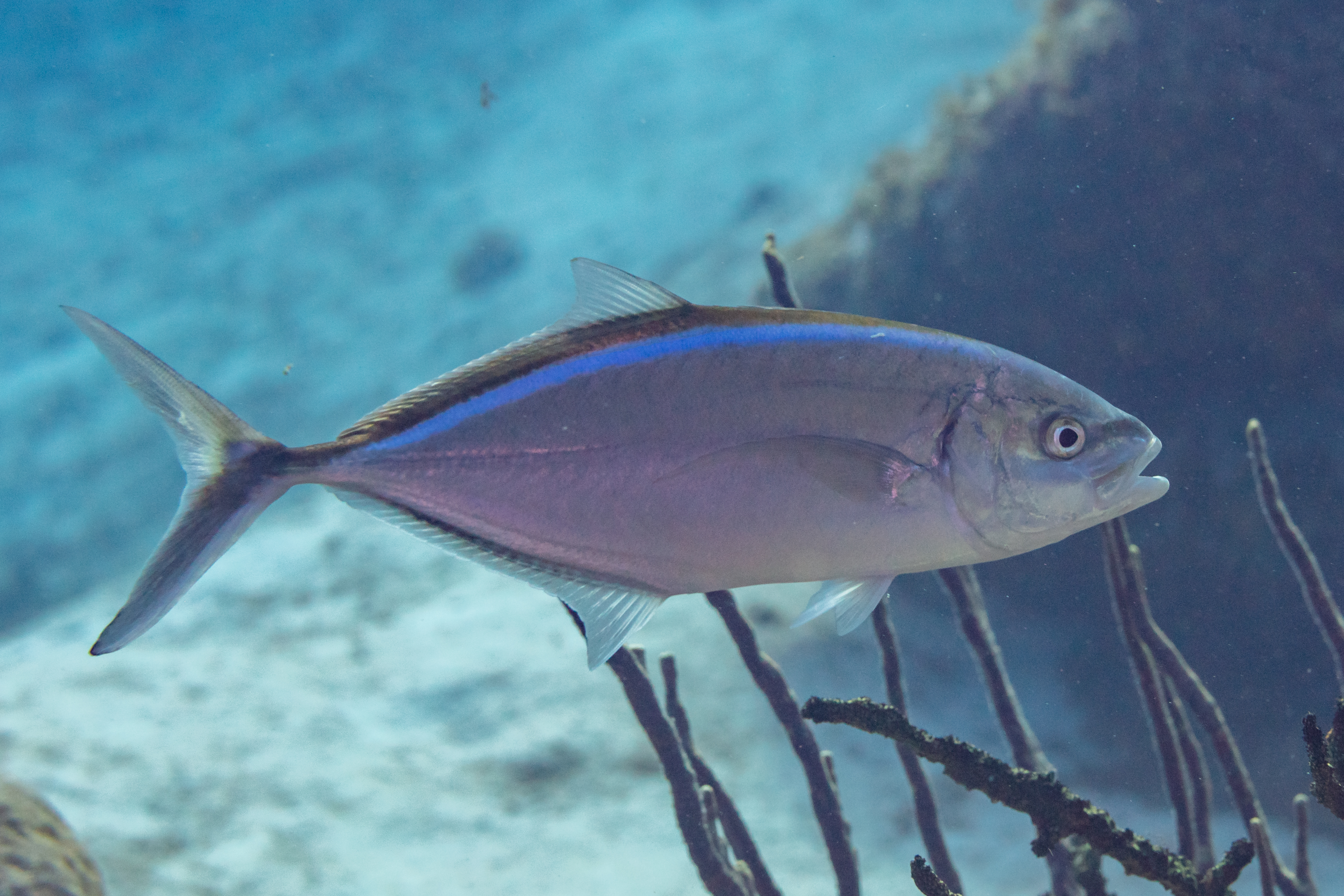

Conservation status
- Least Concern (IUCN 3.1)

Scientific classification
- Kingdom: Animalia
- Phylum: Chordata
- Class: Actinopterygii
- Order: Carangiformes
- Suborder: Carangoidei
- Family: Carangidae
- Genus: Caranx
- Species: C. ruber

Binomial name
- Caranx ruber (Bloch, 1793)
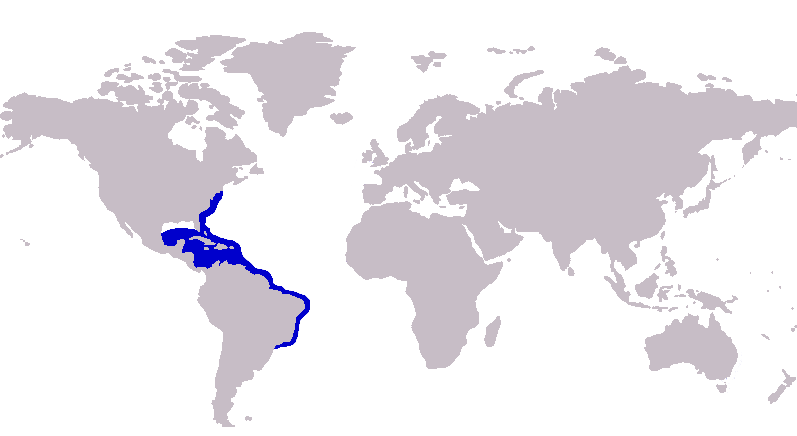
- Approximate range of the bar jack

Synonyms
- Somber ruber Bloch, 1793; Carangoides ruber (Bloch, 1793)

= Bar jack =

Species of fish

The bar jack (Caranx ruber), also known as the carbonero, cojinúa, red jack, blue-striped cavalla or passing jack, is a common species of inshore marine fish classified in the jack family, Carangidae. The bar jack is distributed through the western Atlantic Ocean from New Jersey and Bermuda in the north to Venezuela and possibly Brazil in the south, with the largest population in the Gulf of Mexico and West Indies. The bar jack is most easily distinguished from similar jacks by the dark horizontal bar which runs along the back and down the caudal fin. It is often accompanied by an electric blue stripe immediately below. Other more detailed differences include dentition and soft ray counts. The bar jack is a moderately large species, growing to a recorded maximum of 65 cm (26 in) and a weight of 6.8 kg (15 lb). The species inhabits clear shallow waters, often over coral reefs where it lives either solitarily or in large schools, taking various fishes, crustaceans and cephalopods as prey. Studies in Cuba indicate spawning occurs between March and August, with sexual maturity reached at 26 cm. It is a relatively popular sport fish and can be caught on light tackle with a variety of lures and baits. It is considered to be a good food fish, however many recorded ciguatera cases are attributed to the species, with most cases reported on the island of St. Thomas traced to this single species.

== Taxonomy and naming ==
The bar jack is classified within the genus Caranx, a group of fishes commonly known as jacks and trevallies, which is part of the larger jack and horse mackerel family Carangidae, which in turn is part of the order Carangiformes. The fish is still often classified in the genus Carangoides by some authors, including ITIS and the Catalogue of Fishes but the major taxonomic authorities Fishbase, WoRMS and the Encyclopedia of Life which all list it as belonging in Caranx, which this article follows.

The bar jack was first scientifically described under the name Somber ruber by Marcus Bloch, in 1793 based on a specimen taken from the east coast of America, which was designated to be the holotype. Caranx is derived from the French word, carangue, or a fish from the Caribbean, while ruber (sometimes incorrectly spelled rubber) is Latin for red. Bloch attributed the species to the mackerels of the genus Scomber, a common practice during this period as the genus Caranx and subsequent family Carangidae were not created until 1801 by Bernard Germain de Lacépède. The species has been variably placed in either Carangoides or Caranx since 1801, with the status of the species still somewhat ambiguous. A recent study of the molecular systematics of the Carangidae using mitochondrial cytochrome b sequences strongly supported placement in the genus Caranx, with C. ruber being most closely related to Caranx bartholomaei, itself still often classified under Carangoides. Both C. ruber and C. bartholomaei were strongly related to other well known members of Caranx, and only distantly related to any other species of Carangoides.

Aside from the most commonly used name of "bar jack", other common names for this fish include blue-striped cavalla, red jack, neverbite, passing jack, and pointnose, as well as many non-English names.

== Description ==
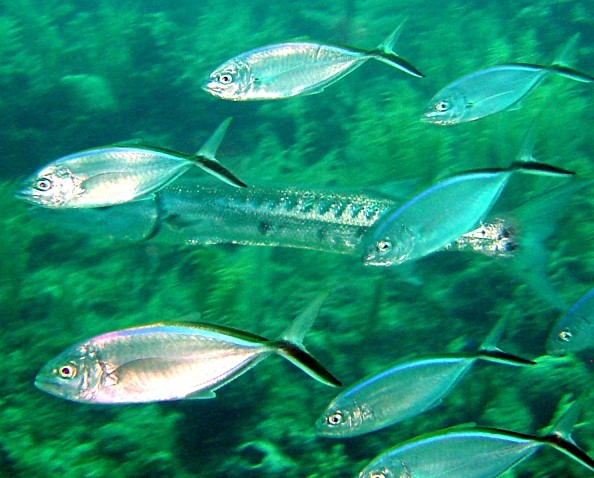
A school of bar jacks over a shallow reef

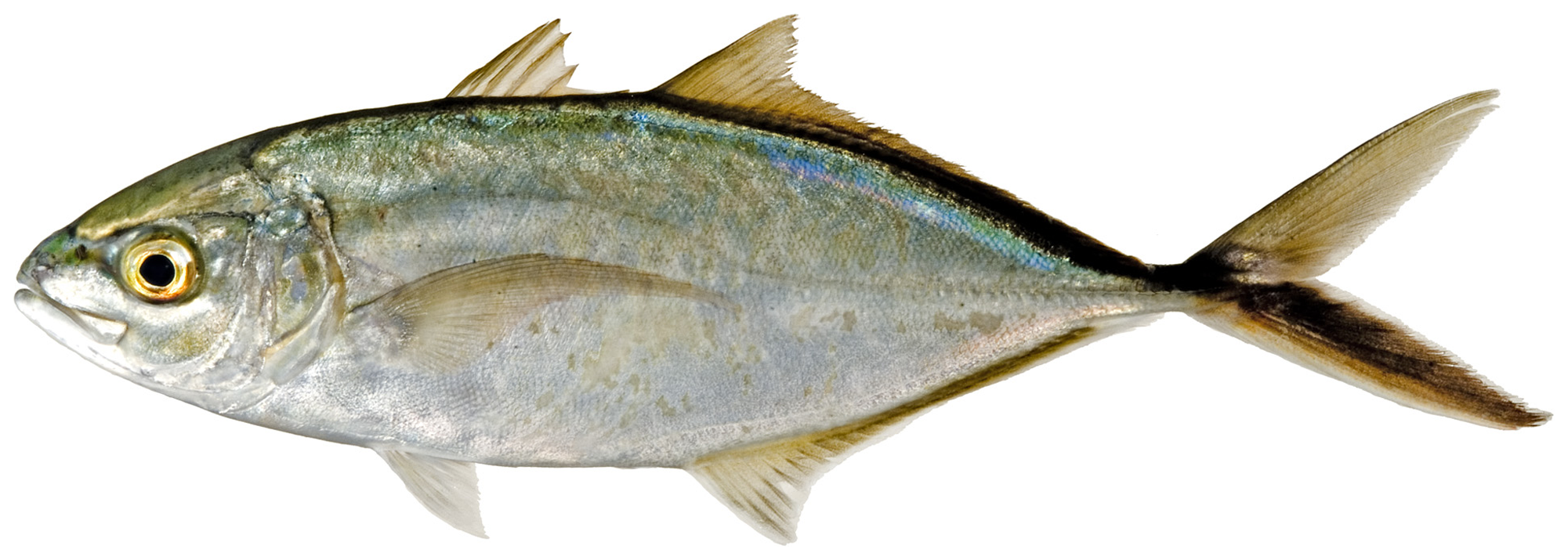
Caranx ruber closeup

The bar jack is a moderately large species, growing to a recorded maximum length of 69 cm (27 in), and a weight of 6.8 kg (15 lb), but is commonly encountered at lengths of less than 40 cm (16 in). The bar jack displays the typical body shape of most of the jacks, having an elongate, moderately deep and compressed form, with dorsal and ventral profiles of approximately equal convexity. The dorsal fin is divided into two sections, the first consisting of 8 spines while the second has 1 spine followed by 26 to 30 soft rays. The anal fin is composed of 2 anteriorly detached spines followed by 1 spine and 23 to 26 soft rays, with both the anal and soft dorsal fin lobes being slightly elongated. The pectoral fins are falcate and longer than the head, consisting of 19 to 21 soft rays. The lateral line is moderately arched anteriorly, and possesses 17 to 104 scales including 23 to 29 scutes posteriorly; also having bilateral paired caudal keels present. The chest is completely scaled, which easily distinguishes it from the similar crevalle jack, Caranx hippos. The snout is moderately pointed, with both the jaws containing narrow bands of villiform teeth, with the bands becoming wider anteriorly. The upper jaw also contains an outer row of enlarged recurved teeth. There are 10 to 14 upper limb gill rakers, and 31 to 38 on the lower limb and 24 vertebrae.

The bar jack has a gray to grayish blue upper body with a silvery tint, which fades ventrally to a white belly. As indicated by their common name, adult bar jack have a horizontal stripe running along their back and through the lower lobe of the caudal fin. This bar is a golden brownish to blackish color, often with an electric blue bar running parallel immediately underneath it. All other fins are pale dusky to hyaline. Juveniles have up to 6 dark bands on their body and a darker lower caudal lobe than the upper lobe, foreshadowing the bar that develops at a later stage. At these early stages, they are difficult to distinguish from Carangoides bartholomaei, with the best identifier being gill raker counts. The entire body has been observed to change colour to a blackish colour when the fish is feeding near the bottom.

== Distribution and habitat ==
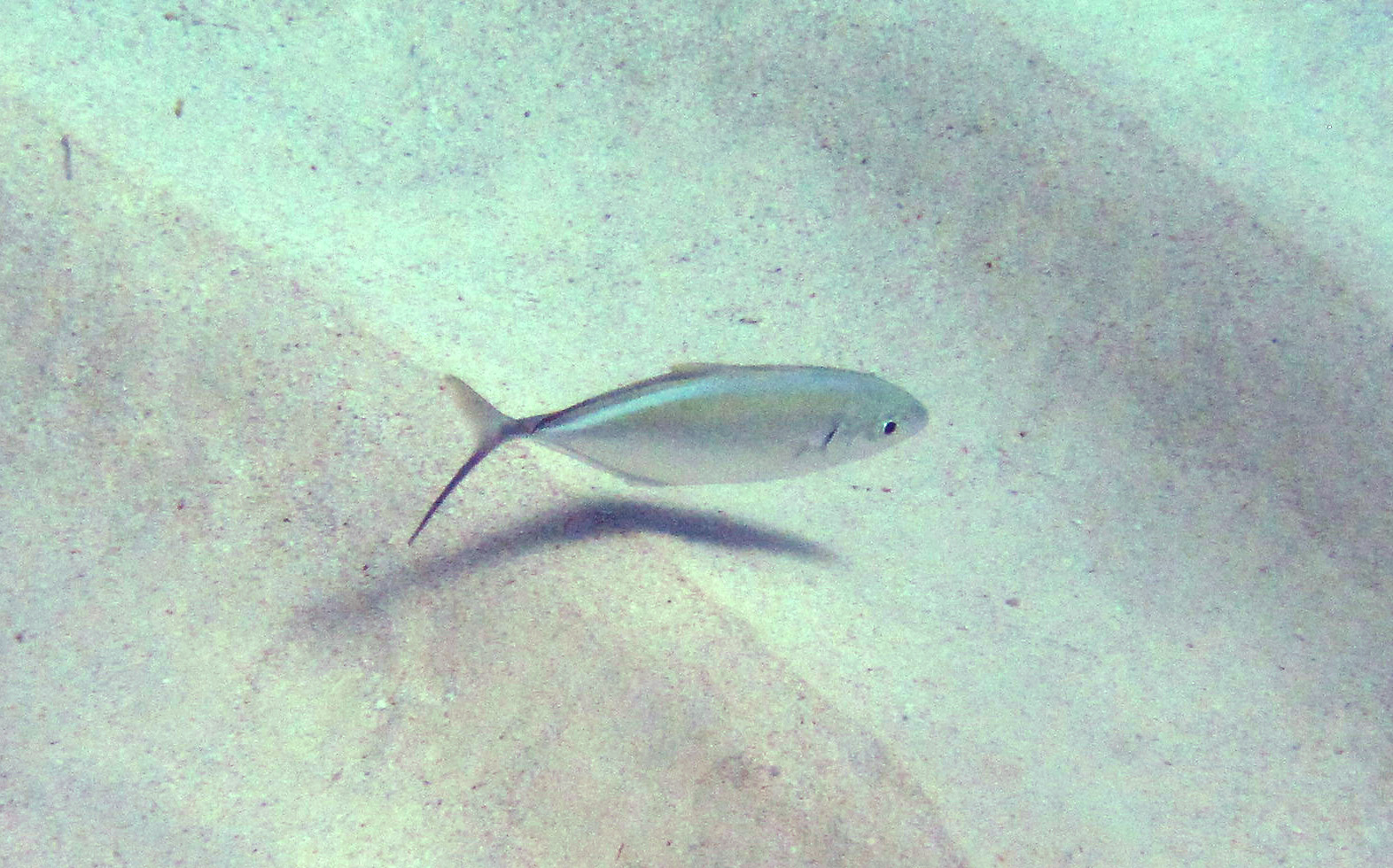
Bar jack over sand off San Salvador Island, Bahamas

The bar jack is widely distributed throughout the tropical and subtropical waters of the western Atlantic Ocean, and is a common species throughout most of its range. The northernmost limit of its range is New Jersey in the northern United States, with its range extending south along the continental coast to Venezuela. It inhabits a number of offshore islands and archipelagos including Bermuda, as well as the West Indies. The bar jack is most abundant in the Gulf of Mexico, the West Indies and Caribbean, but in the Gulf of Mexico is limited to offshore waters. There have been reliable reports of the species from Rio de Janeiro in Brazil and far offshore at Saint Helena in the south central Atlantic, which would extend the species southern limit significantly if correct.

The bar jack generally live in clear shallow water environments, predominantly around coral reefs to depths of around 60 ft (18 m). Tagging studies demonstrate the species is highly mobile, not lingering over one particular reef patch for very long, often moving between reefs over large expanses of sand. Bar jack often venture into lagoons from seaward reefs, preferring to move over the sandy substrate while in these shallow waters, often forming shoals alongside barracudas, stingrays and sharks. Unlike most fish live on both the lagoon and reef, there is no particular age partitioning, with both juveniles and adults entering the lagoon to forage. Records of bar jack taken from Saint Helena came from seamounts in waters deeper than 100 m (330 ft), indicating they live in more offshore pelagic waters also. Juveniles are often found under floating sargassum mats, using the algae for protection. They also inhabit areas around docks and pilings. Juveniles can be caught using a sabiki rig.

== Biology ==
The diet and reproductive biology of the bar jack are relatively well documented, with most studies centered on the waters of Cuba during the 1980s, with nearly all of this research published in the Russian publication Voprosy Ikhtiologii, reprinted in English as the Journal of Ichthyology. The movements of the species between patches has also been studied and is presented above. The bar jack is commonly taken as prey by a number of other large carangids as well as dolphinfish, mackerels, marlins and various seabirds.

=== Diet and feeding ===
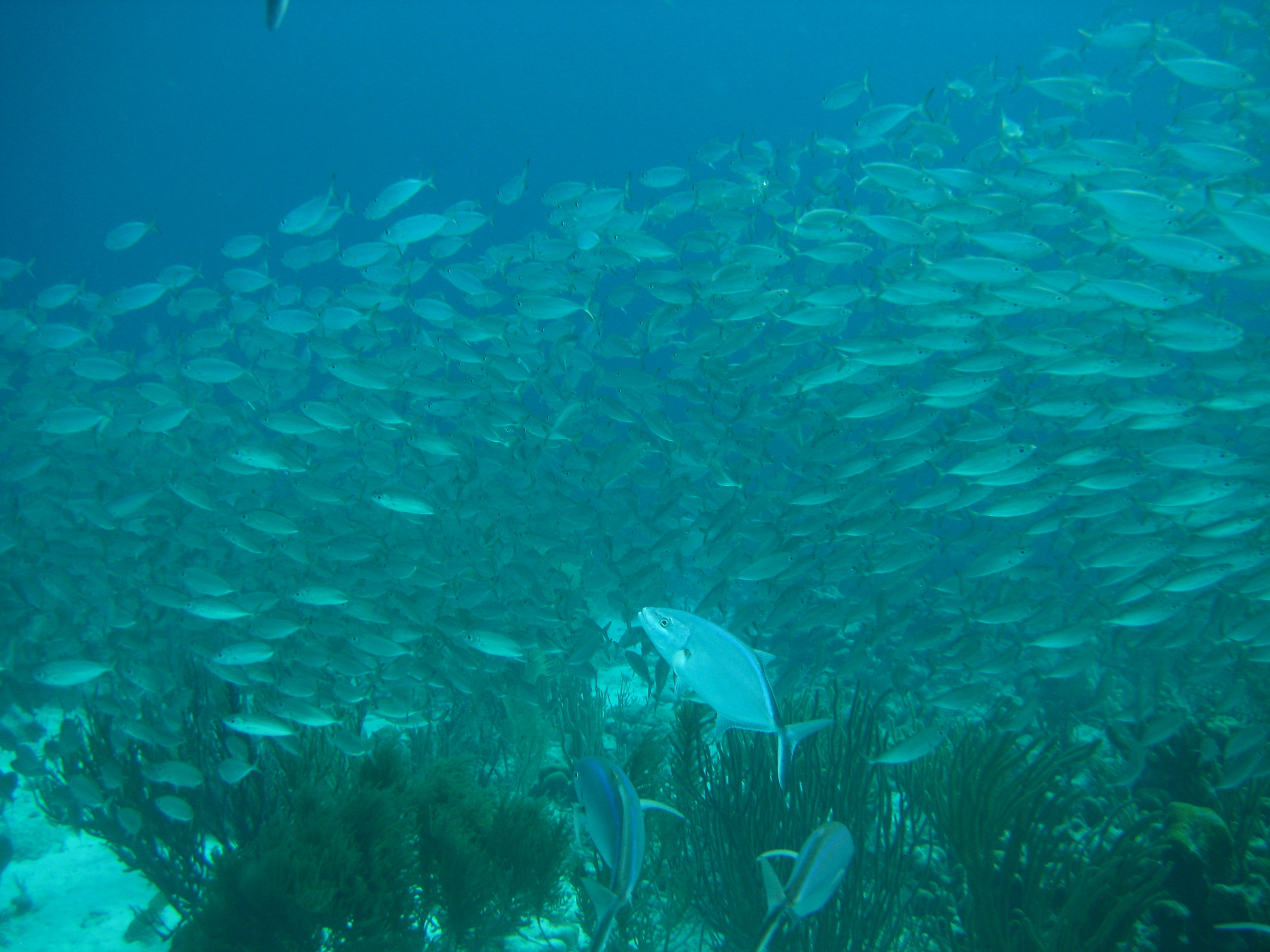
Bar jacks herding a school of forage fish

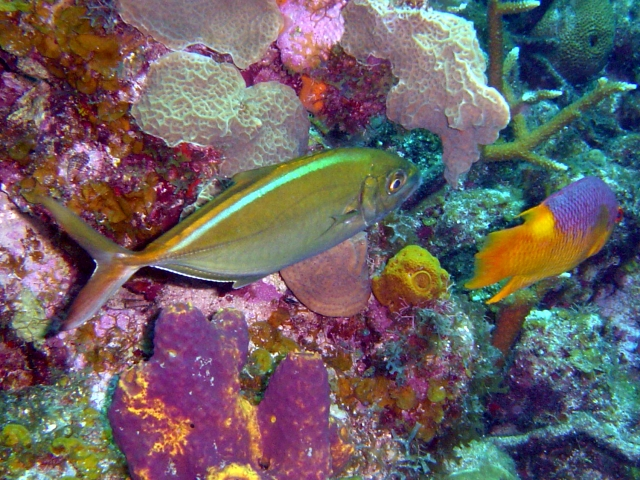
A bar jack foraging alongside a Spanish hogfish on a coral reef. Note the slight colour change on the dorsal surface.

The bar jack is a benthopelagic predator, taking its prey both in midwater and along the seafloor. The diet consists mostly of fish, up to 90% of the fish's intake in some studies, with planktonic crustaceans and small cephalopods taken in minor volumes. There is significant change in diet with age in fish studied off Cuba, which may reduce intraspecific competition in the species. Young fish prefer planktonic organisms, predominantly decapod and fish larvae; fish reaching sexual maturity prey on shrimp and small fish, while mature fish feed almost exclusively on small fish. The fish species preferred by bar jack appear to be mostly small sand dwellers such as blennies and gobies or small reef dwellers including wrasses, butterflyfish and filefish, with the diet of the latter leading to the accumulation of coral derived ciguatera toxin in the jack's flesh. Other lesser taken prey items include gastropods, nematodes and benthic algae as well as a range of crustaceans.

Feeding intensity varies throughout the year, and is strongly correlated to changes in the precipitation and wind during cyclical shifts in the climate. Young fish tend to feed intensively throughout the year, but show a peak in the spring and autumn months, while adults intensify their feeding during the dry and rainy seasons, with feeding declining during intermediate periods (winter and early summer). Daily intakes during the period of intensive feeding reach 3–7% of the fish's body weight, and during the periods of decline to 0.5–2%, with the annual intake being 1000–1500% of the body weight. In a 1993 paper, Troy Baird reported a foraging association between bar jacks and puddingwife wrasse, Halichoeres radiatus, in which a jack followed a single wrasse while it foraged for food. These associations were initiated by both jacks and wrasse, with apparently little pilfering of uncovered items, suggesting a beneficial relationship to both parties. While foraging with the wrasse, the jack increases its prey detection levels, which is useful for a species which is more adept at pelagic hunting, allowing it to be more efficient at this less common mode of food gathering.

=== Reproduction and growth ===
The bar jack spawns twice each year, with this timing related to seasonal changes as described previously. During the peak feeding periods, the fish accumulate body fat in preparation for spawning, which occurs through the period from March to August in Cuba, with peaks during March–April and June–July. Fish congregate in schools of hundreds to spawn, with pairs of fish breaking away to spawn. Studies have found between 67,000 and 231,000 eggs are released by each female, with fertilisation occurring externally. The eggs are pelagic and around 0.75 mm to 0.85 mm in diameter, hatching when the larvae are around 2 mm in length, and flexion occurs at 4–5 mm. The larval stage of the bar jack has been extensively described by Richards (2006). Larvae appear between April and October in the Gulf Stream current, and grow the fastest during their first three years of life. During this early stage of life they are very similar to Carangoides bartholomaei, and often form associations with floating pelagic Sargassum mats which provide the young fish with protection. Young fish often inhabit the shallow reef waters, but move offshore once they reach sexual maturity. Due to a lack of discernible otolith rings, no studies on the growth of the bar jack have been published. Males and females reach sexual maturity at different lengths; males at 25 cm (9.8 in) and females at 31 cm (12 in).

== Relationship to humans ==
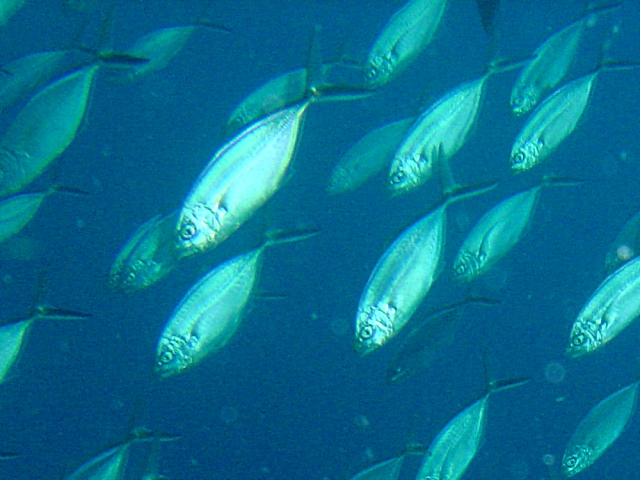
A school of bar jacks in open water

The bar jack is of minor to intermediate importance to fisheries through its range; both commercially and to recreational fishermen. Archaeological evidence from San Salvador Island in the Bahamas demonstrates this species has long been targeted by humans for food, with the native Indians of the region often taking the bar jack for consumption, although it was of lesser importance than reef fishes such as parrotfishes and groupers. Modern fisheries take considerable quantities of the fish, but it rarely makes up the bulk of the catch. Catch statistics are not available for most countries. The United States reports only a small catch of between 0 and 15 tonnes per year, but with the abundance of the species in the Caribbean, larger catches are made here. The bar jack is somewhat shy of baited hooks and is therefore taken predominantly by trawls and seines. It is marketed fresh in the Antilles and Bahamas, with its edibility rated fair to very good.

The bar jack is a popular light tackle game fish, taken predominantly on small lures and flies, with the species considered to be an excellent fighter on light tackle. The species is often sighted working small baitfish to the surface, where they can be targeted with surface poppers or various fly patterns. As mentioned previously, they rarely take baited hooks. The species is often used as bait for larger game fish such as marlin and sailfish. The IGFA All Tackle World Record for the species stands at 7 lb 5oz (3.32 kg) jigged up off Martim Vaz Island, Brazil by Fernando de Almeida in May 2012. The previous world record was caught off of Key West, Florida. Identification of large Bar Jack is complicated by their close resemblance to Yellow Jack which grows to a much larger size, up to 30 lbs. The bar jack has a significant risk of carrying the ciguatera toxin in its flesh, and numerous reports of people contracting the poisoning after consuming the fish. A comprehensive study of the toxin in the West Indies listed the bar jack as a species of intermediate risk of carrying the toxin, although most cases in St. Thomas of the Virgin Islands can be traced back to the bar jack.
