= Jax =

Jax may refer to:

== Brands and companies ==
- Jackson Laboratory, a biology research center
- Jax Brewing Company, in Jacksonville, Florida
- Jax Media, a film and television production company
- Jax Tyres & Auto, an Australian retailer

== Computing ==
- JAX (software), a machine learning framework for transforming numerical functions
- Java XML, a set of APIs for the Java programming language

== Places ==
- Jax, Haute-Loire, France
- Jacksonville, Florida, United States, colloquially referred to as Jax
  - Jacksonville station, Amtrak station
  - Jacksonville International Airport
  - Naval Air Station Jacksonville

== Sports ==
- Portland LumberJax, a former professional lacrosse team from Portland, Oregon, US

=== Jacksonville, Florida, US ===
- Jacksonville Jaguars, an American professional football franchise
- Jacksonville Jax, a former minor league baseball team
- FC JAX Destroyers, an American former professional soccer team

== People ==
=== Given name ===
- Jax (drag queen) (born 1997)
- Jax (singer) (born 1996), American Idol contestant
- Jax Anderson (born 1999), American singer
- Jax Dane (born 1981), American professional wrestler
- Jax Jones (born 1987), British musician
- Jax Malcolm (born 2003), American actor
- Jax Slayher, American adult film actor
- Jax Taylor (born 1979), American television personality, model and actor

=== Surname ===
- Garth Jax (born 1963), American football player
- Nia Jax (born 1984), American wrestler
- Griffin Jax (born 1994), American baseball player

=== Fictional characters ===
- Jax (Mortal Kombat), a fighting game character
- Jax Teller, from the TV show Sons of Anarchy
- Jasper Jacks, from the TV show General Hospital
- Jefferson Jackson (Arrowverse), nicknamed "Jax"
- Jax Amnell, from the Terry Goodkinds novel The Law of Nines
- Jax, a Beast Bot in Power Rangers Beast Morphers
- Jax, from the animated series The Amazing Digital Circus
- Jax, from the video game ELEX
- Jax, in the mobile video game Mo.co
- Jax, from the comic strip You Can with Beakman and Jax
- Jax, from The Kingkiller Chronicle by Patrick Rothfuss
- Jaxx, played by Ruby Rose in the film The Meg
- Jax, Eubie's cousin from Higglytown Heroes
- Jax, from the comic book series Jax and the Hellhound

== Other uses ==
- Jambi Malay (ISO 639-3 code: jax), a language spoken in Indonesia
- Ornipholidotos jax, a butterfly in the family Lycaenidae

== See also ==
- Jacks (disambiguation)
- Jackson (disambiguation)
- Jax Panik, a South African performing act
- Jaxon (disambiguation)
- Jaxson (disambiguation)
- MathJax, software to display mathematical equations in web browsers
- Ajax (disambiguation)
