= JACS =

JACS or Jacs may refer to:

- Jewish Alcoholics, Chemically Dependent Persons and Significant Others
- Joint Academic Coding System, a system to classify academic subjects in the United Kingdom
- Journal of the American Ceramic Society
- Journal of the American Chemical Society
  - JACS Au, a monthly online journal published by the American Chemical Society
- Journal of the American College of Surgeons
- Jacs Holt, a character in the television series Wentworth

== See also ==
- JAC (disambiguation)
