= Liz Hayes =

Australian journalist

- Born: 23 May 1956 (age 70); Taree, New South Wales, Australia
- Occupations: Journalist, reporter, television presenter
- Years active: 1981–present
- Employer: Nine Network
- Known for: Presenter and reporter on 60 Minutes
- Notable work: Presenter on National Nine News; Co-host on Today with Steve Liebmann; Reporter for Ten Eyewitness News; Journalist for New Idea and TV Week
- Spouses: Brian Hayes (divorced); John Singleton (m. 1991–1992): Ben Crane

Elizabeth Hayes (née Ryan, born 23 May 1956) is an Australian reporter, journalist and television presenter.

== Early life ==
Hayes was born in 1956 in the rural town of Taree, New South Wales. Her parents were dairy farmers. She entered journalism as a cadet on the local Manning River Times newspaper, becoming assistant editor then moved to Sydney.

== Career ==
Hayes is best known for her work as a reporter on 60 Minutes and as a co-host of Today. On moving to Sydney she worked for New Idea and TV Week magazines for a few weeks before becoming a reporter for Network Ten's Eyewitness News.

In 1981, she was signed to the Nine Network, reporting for National Nine News and then presenting National Nine Morning News. In 1986, Hayes was appointed co-host of the TV program Today with Steve Liebmann where she stayed as co-host until 1996 when Tracy Grimshaw replaced her. In 1996, she joined 60 Minutes as a corresponden. In 2021, Hayes celebrated 40 years with the Nine Network. In 2025, she left Nine Network after 44 years, amid a "standoff" with an exec.

== Personal life ==
Hayes met and married her first husband, Bryan Hayes, a builder, in her home town of Taree. Despite being divorced from him she uses his surname as her professional name. She was also briefly married to the advertising entrepreneur John Singleton in 1991, becoming his fourth wife.

Ben Crane, a former 60 Minutes soundman, has been her partner since the early 2000s.
