= Flag jacking =

Territorial disguise

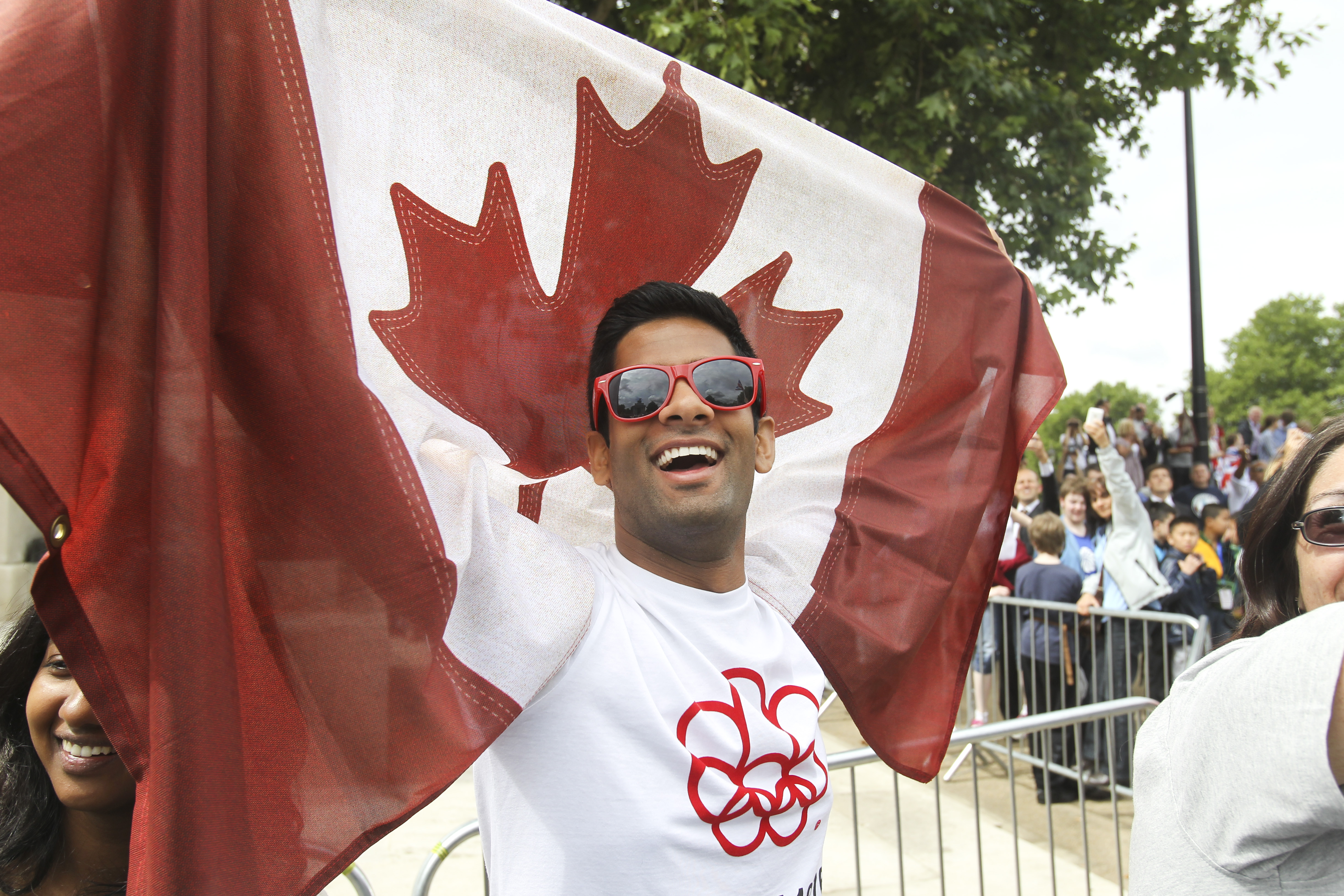
A person holding a Canadian flag during the 2012 Summer Olympics in London

Flag-jacking (French: prise de drapeau) is the act of travelers displaying a foreign flag on their clothing or backpack in an attempt to disguise their country of origin; media reports have described this most often in the context of American tourists using Canadian flags in an attempt to be perceived as Canadians. While often referenced in popular culture, there is little quantitative evidence of how common the practice is, and some accounts suggest it is anecdotal or situational.

== Origin ==
The term flag-jacking gained additional popularity after an article entitled "How to Spot Flag-Jacking Frauds Abroad" was published on 1 July 2013 by The Huffington Post. The article stated that flag-jacking is a transitory act involving a person's use of a country's flag to create the false impression of being a citizen of a favored nation. The most common situation, according to the article, is when Americans pose as Canadians. Instances of flag-jacking date to the late 1990s.

== Identification ==
Business Insider, CNN, FlightNetwork, and The Huffington Post have claimed it is possible to identify flag jackers by analysing their body language. In honor of Canada Day in 2013, FlightNetwork and their PR Agency (Pointman News Creation) commissioned Mark Bowden (of Truthplane) a top international body language expert, to provide humorous tips on how Americans can pass themselves off as Canadians by adopting gestures that he termed the "Maple-o-gy", the "Canuck Crinkle", the "Toque Tilt", the "Stars and Gripes Forever", the "Polka-Loon" and the "American Psycho".
