= Ice jacking =

Structural damage caused by freezing water

Ice jacking occurs when water permeates a confined space within a structural support or a geological formation, ultimately causing structural fracture when the water freezes and expands. The force from this expansion can damage shorelines, rock faces, and other natural environments. This has the potential to lead to property damage and environmental changes. Ice jacking most commonly refers to shoreline damage caused by lakes freezing, but it has also been applied to geologic engineering and rock erosion. When this occurs within rocks, it is called ice wedging. When this occurs within the soil, it is called frost heaving or ice heaving. It is similar in appearance to, but not to be confused with, ice shove, which is a pile-up of ice on a shoreline.

== Lakes and shorelines ==
Ice jacking is a continuous process that occurs during the winter in areas near lakes. The process starts when the ice begins to crack. When water then fills in those gaps, the process repeats and continues until there is a wall of ice surrounding the lake's shoreline, sometimes reaching up to three feet. The extent of ice jacking often depends on temperatures and snow coverage. When there is snow atop the ice, it serves as an insulating layer that helps the ice stay at a constant temperature. When there is no snow, the ice is subject to changing ambient temperatures. Thus, when the temperature decreases, ice not covered by snow will contract, forming cracks that will later be filled in with water from below. When the temperature rises, the ice expands and pushes up towards the shoreline since it has nowhere else to go. More pressure is put on the shoreline as the ice is jacked towards it, often leading to ice ridges or mounds of rock and soil pushed upwards.

Ice jacking can provide benefits to a lake ecosystem by trapping nutrients in the ice, creating organic fertilizer. This also creates a buffer zone (a transition between land and aquatic organisms) by fostering plant growth on the shoreline which helps the development of future organisms and can aid in growing fish populations. However, ice jacking is impractical because of the lack of control over the process. There are a few defenses that can fight against ice jacking, such as building a riprap or adding sand to the shoreline, but these defenses have variable outcomes. For example, the riprap could allow the natural process to take place, but there is no guarantee these natural processes would help; they could just as likely repair the damage as leave the affected areas damaged. There are no methods that will prevent damage from ice jacking.

Ice jacking can also cause severe property damage, such as occurred on December 17, 2008, at a Gondola tower on Blackcomb Mountain in Whistler, British Columbia. The tower collapsed as the water froze in a splice on the tower, causing structural failure when the water expanded around 2:30 p.m., leaving over fifty passengers stranded in sub-zero temperatures for hours. Following the incident, lift maintenance teams conducted inspections of all other towers to make sure there would be no other occurrence of ice jacking before resuming operation.

== Geologic engineering ==
Ice jacking is one form of rock erosion. Ice jacking—because of the water in joints or fissure surfaces within rocks—can cause rock slope failures. This type of failure is progressive, resulting in incremental weakening over time, often requiring several cycles before failure. In a 2005 study, middle-sized rocks (10 to 100,000 m^{3}) in the French subalpine mountain ranges fell from elevations ranging between 200 meters and 2000 meters above sea level. The statistical analysis studied the triggering factors of 46 rockfalls and investigated the rainfall, freeze-thaw cycles, and earthquakes in the region. A correlation was found between slope failure and freeze-thaw cycles, suggesting that ice jacking is a major triggering factor in rockfalls.

On December 17, 2008, a Gondola tower on Blackcomb Mountain in Whistler, British Columbia, collapsed due to ice jacking. The splice broke when the water entered a section of the fourth tower and expanded. This occurred around 2:30 PM and left over fifty passengers stranded in sub-zero temperatures for hours. All passengers stuck in cabins on the Excalibur Gondola lift were rescued, with only twelve suffering from mild injuries. Many passengers recall watching in horror as the cars swung sideways, one dangling above the creek. Although some cabins fell, reports state that none of the cabins came off the cable, but that the cable's strength had been significantly compromised. Following the incident, lift maintenance teams conducted inspections of all other towers to ensure no other ice jacking occurrence. After a second inspection by the British Columbia Safety Authority (BCSA), the lift was approved to perform regularly again.

== See also ==
- Frost weathering – Mechanical weathering induced by freezing water
- Oxide jacking – Damage to stone caused by the oxidation of embedded metal
