= Oxide jacking =

Damage to stone caused by the oxidation of embedded metal

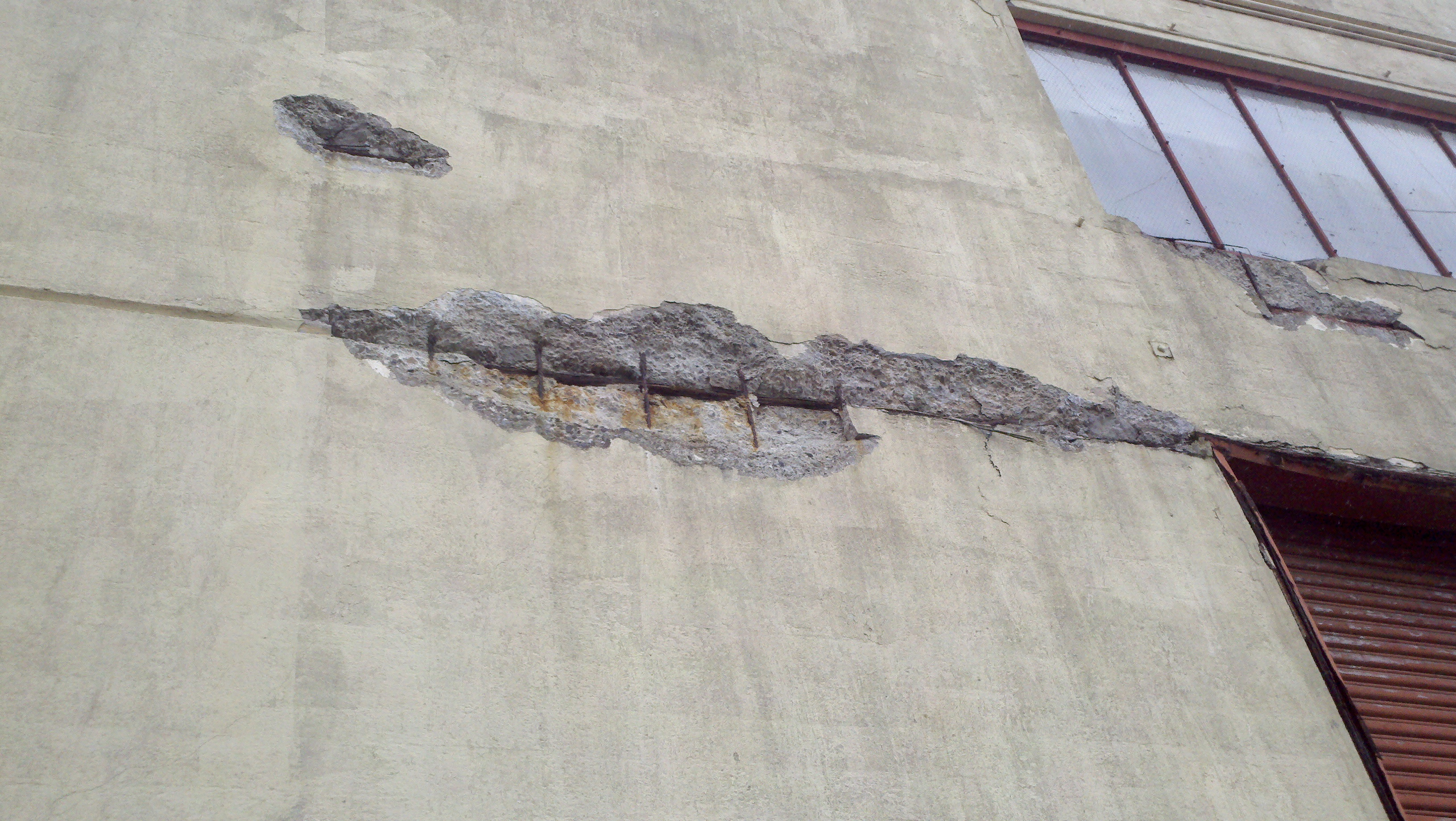
Oxide jacking has caused concrete spalling on walls of the Herbst Pavilion at Fort Mason Center in San Francisco

The expansive force of rusting, which may be called oxide jacking, rust jacking, or rust burst, is a phenomenon that can cause damage to structures made of stone, masonry, concrete or ceramics, and reinforced with metal components. A definition is "the displacement of building elements due to the expansion of iron and steel products as the metal rusts and becomes iron oxide". Corrosion of other metals such as aluminum can also cause oxide jacking.

== Physical process ==
According to metallurgist Jack Harris, "Oxidation is usually accompanied by a net expansion so that when it occurs in a confined space stresses are generated in the metal component itself or in any surrounding medium such as stone or cement. So much energy is released by oxidation that the stresses generated are of sufficient magnitude to deform or fracture all known materials."

As early as 1915, it was recognized that certain modern metal alloys are more susceptible to excessive oxidation when subjected to weathering than other metals. At that time, there was a trend to replace wrought iron fasteners with mild steel equivalents, which were less expensive. Unexpectedly, the mild steel fasteners failed in real world use much more quickly than anticipated, leading to a return to use of wrought iron in certain applications where length of service was important.

== Damage to notable buildings ==
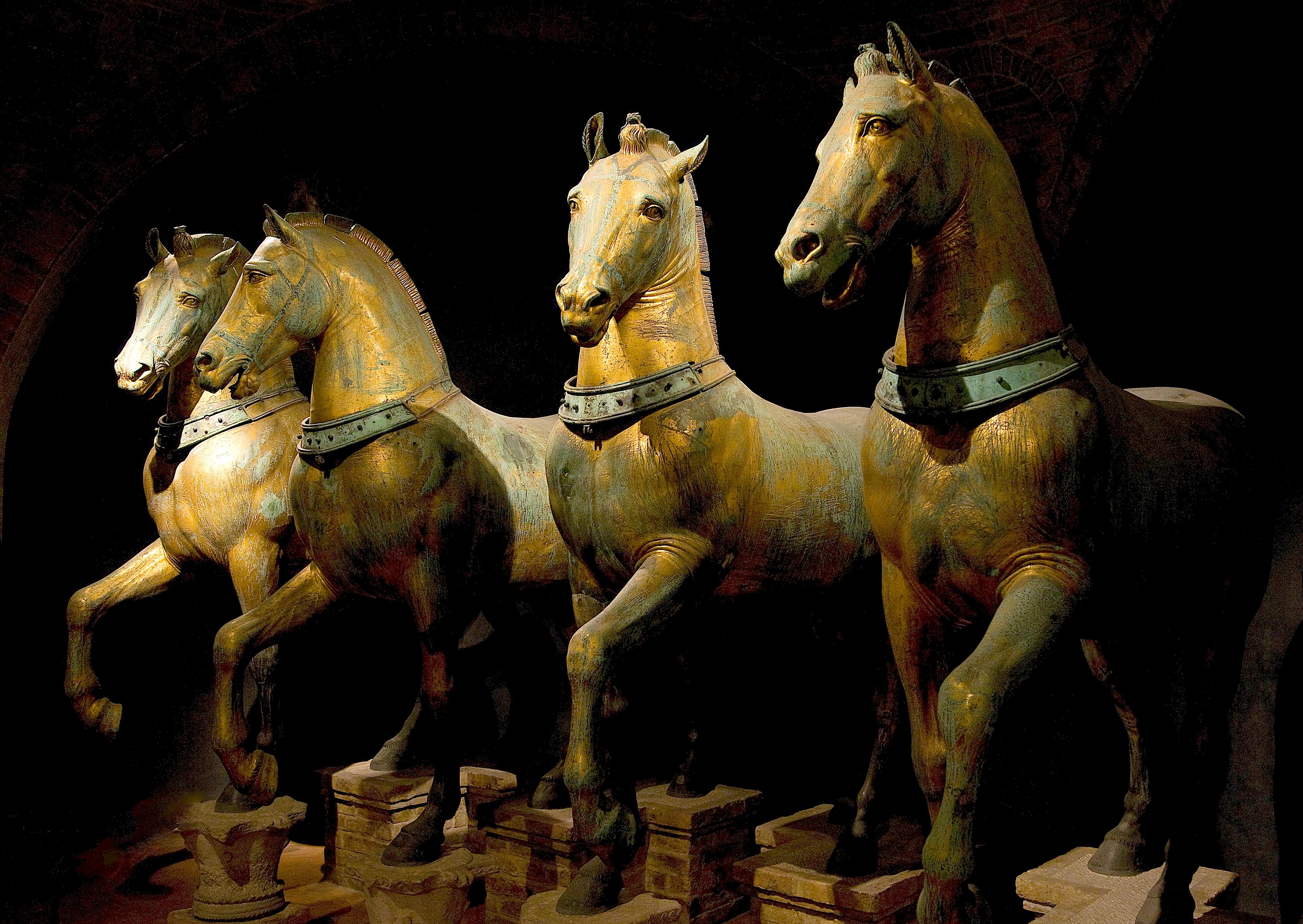
These original Horses of Saint Mark have been relocated indoors, and replaced by replicas.

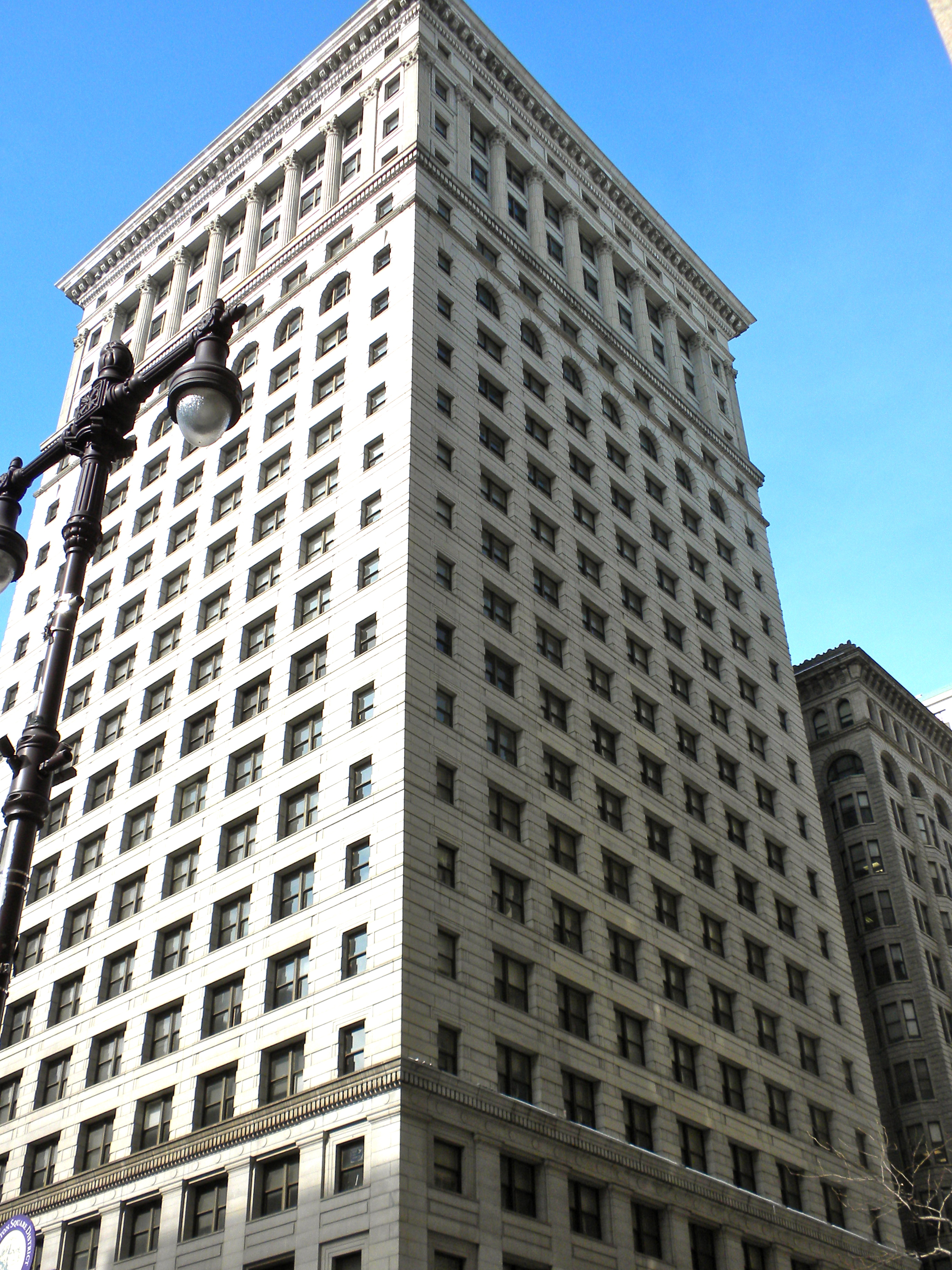
The cornice at the top of the Land Title Building was damaged by oxide jacking.

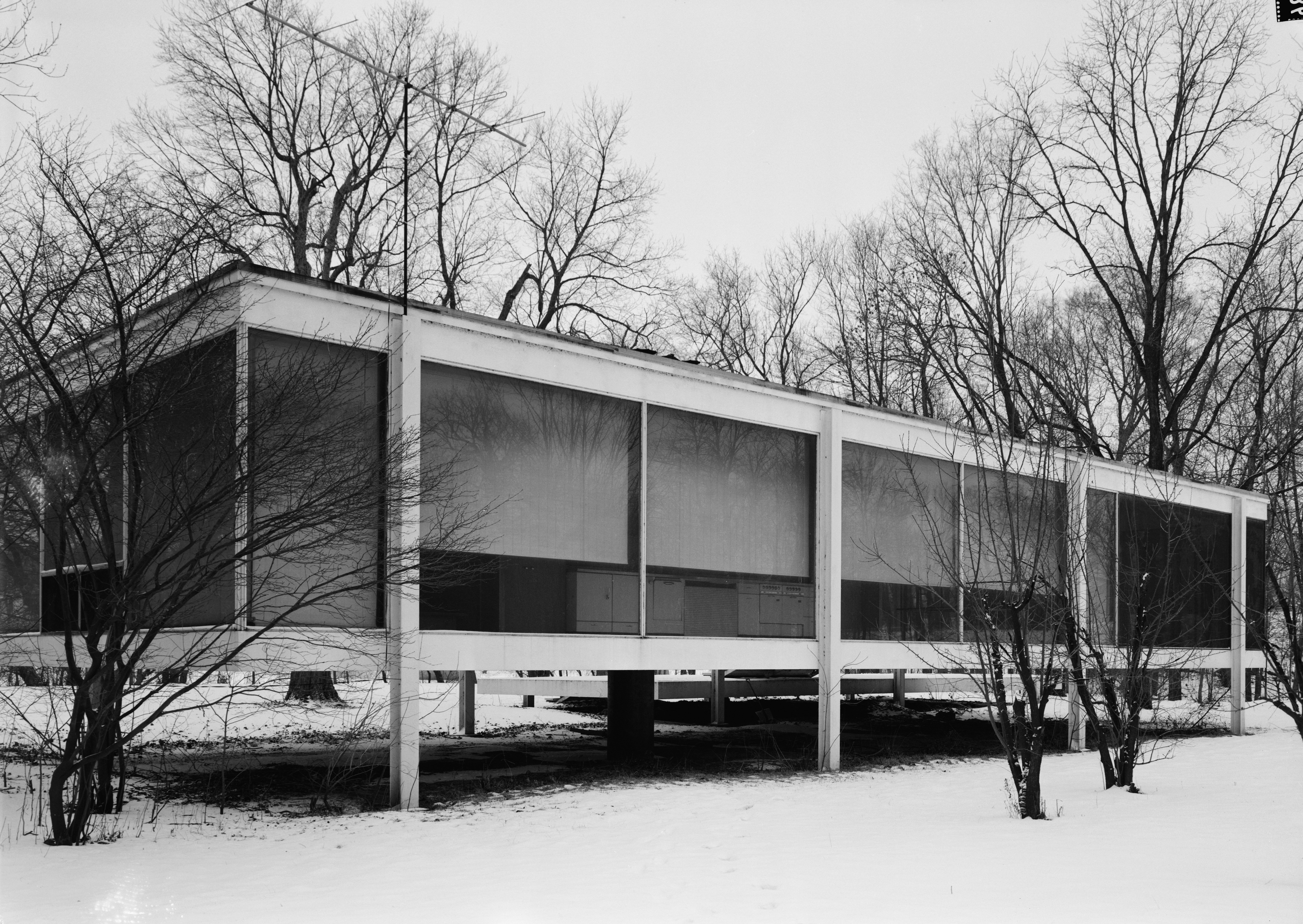
Oxide jacking damage was discovered after a flood at the Farnsworth House.

In a 1987 article in New Scientist, Jack Harris reported that oxide jacking has caused significant damage to many historic structures in the United Kingdom, including St Paul's Cathedral, the British Museum and the Albert Memorial in London, Gloucester Cathedral, St. Margaret's Church in King's Lynn, Winchester Cathedral, and Blackburn Cathedral.

Harris also wrote that oxide jacking also damaged the ancient Horses of Saint Mark on the exterior of St. Mark's Basilica in Venice. Expansive rusting of iron and steel bolts and reinforcements affected the structural integrity of the copper horse sculptures, which were relocated indoors and replaced with replicas. Poorly-designed early 20th-century renovations also led to oxide jacking damage to the Acropolis of Athens.

In the United States, rusting of iron pegs inserted into holes in the stone entrance stair in order to support handrails resulted in cracking of the steps at the Basilica of the Sacred Heart in Notre Dame, Indiana.

Oxide jacking damaged the terra cotta cornice on the Land Title Building in Philadelphia, designed in 1897 and expanded in 1902 by pioneer skyscraper architect Daniel Burnham. The Land Title complex, with its two interconnected towers, is on the National Register of Historic Places. By 1922, experts on architectural terra cotta were warning that the rusting of embedded iron fasteners could cause decorative building components to fail. This 1902 cornice is nearly 9 feet (2.7 m) high, projects 7 feet (2.1 m) from the facade of the building and is 465 feet (142 m) long. The cornice was stabilized, steel anchors subject to rusting were replaced with new stainless steel anchors, and the cornice was completely renovated. The project was completed in 1991.

Flooding in 2007 damaged the modernist Farnsworth House in Plano, Illinois, designed in 1945 by Ludwig Mies van der Rohe, and now owned by the National Trust for Historic Preservation. Among the damage discovered by an architect inspecting the house in 2007 was oxide jacking at the corners of the house's steel framework. The house flooded again in 2008.

== Damage to reinforced concrete bridges and buildings ==
Structures built of concrete and reinforced with metal rebar are also subject to damage by oxide jacking. Expansion of corroded rebar causes spalling of the concrete. Structures exposed to a marine environment, or where salt is used for de-icing purposes, are especially susceptible to this type of damage. This may also be caused by concrete having been installed without sufficient cover for the rebars, allowing moisture to reach the metal and cause oxidation.

Research in the 1960s showed that 22 percent of concrete bridge decks in Pennsylvania showed signs of spalling due to oxide jacking within four years of construction. Oxide jacking caused widespread damage to concrete council houses built in the United Kingdom in the post World War II era.

According to an expert in the field, the problem resulted in "intensive worldwide research into the causes and repair of reinforcement corrosion, which in turn led to a vast output of research papers, conferences and publications on the subject."

== Damage to stone countertops ==
Countertop components fabricated out of granite and other natural stones are sometimes reinforced with metal rods inserted into grooves cut into the underside of the stone, and bonded in place with various resins. This procedure is called "rodding" by countertop fabricators. Most commonly, these rods will be placed near sink cutouts to prevent cracking of the brittle stone countertop during transportation and installation. Data published by the Marble Institute of America shows that this technique results in a 600% increase in the deflection strength of the component.

However, if a metal rod subject to oxidation or other forms of corrosion is used, and moisture from a sink or faucet reaches the rod, oxide jacking can crack the countertop directly above the rod. Mild steel and some grades of aluminium rods are known to cause oxide jacking failures in granite countertops. Skilled stone repair professionals can disassemble the cracked stone, remove the metal rod, and reassemble the stone using various resins tinted to match the colors of the stone. This type of problem can be prevented by using reinforcing rods made of stainless steel or fiberglass in the rodding procedure.

== See also ==
- Ice jacking
- Concrete degradation
