= Sabiki =

Hook-and-line fishing rig

A sabiki or flasher rig is typically fished off boats, piers, jetties, or any structure over the water. Sabikis consist of any number (usually between 6 and 10) of small hooks, each one on individual dropper lines that are a few inches long. The individual dropper lines are then tied to a longer leader in series, about 6 inches (15 cm) apart; a weight is tied to the end of the leader. Alternatively, a larger lure or plug can be used at the end. This creates the illusion that a medium-sized fish is chasing 6 to 10 smaller fish.

The individual hooks are decorated as lures or tied like flies similar to those used in fly fishing. Often, they have a simple piece of lumo-infused material or iridescent film attached to them. Traditionally, on any individual rig, all of the lures are either identical or in an alternating sequence of colors. The type or size sabiki used depends on water conditions, species of fish sought, or simply the angler's preference.

This rig is usually used when catching baitfish, though an angler can also attach a bait cage to the rig and catch fish like large snapper, mulloway, flathead, etc. With a bait cage on the rig, users should give a large jerk to release the bait. In Japan, they are used to catch sardines and mackerel off large piers.

Sabiki rigs with their many small, sharp hooks are easily tangled and may snag on pier faces with protrusions such as oyster shells, which can be a nuisance to the angler. If they are not handled carefully, the angler can be hooked. This can be avoided by using a sabiki rod. A sabiki rod is a hollow fishing rod with a funnel-shaped tip. The line is fed from the reel through the hollow body of the rod and out of the funnel-shaped tip. When the sabiki rig is reeled in, the hooks and leaders are drawn directly into the rod where they will not tangle or injure the angler.
