= Banita Jacks =

American convicted murderer

- Born: 1974 (age 51–52); United States
- Conviction: First degree murder (4 counts)
- Penalty: 120 years imprisonment

Banita Jacks is a Washington, D.C., resident convicted of murdering her four daughters, who ranged in age from 5 to 17 years old. On July 29, 2009, Jacks was convicted of the felony murder of all four girls, as well as child cruelty towards all four girls and first-degree murder of the younger three girls.

The girls' bodies were discovered in Jacks' home in January 2008 by federal marshals carrying out an eviction; the girls had died in the summer of 2007. The case led to scrutiny of the Washington social service agencies that failed to prevent the deaths or discover them in the months afterward; four days after the bodies were found, the city's mayor Adrian Fenty fired six employees of Washington's Child and Family Services Agency, saying they "just didn't do their job."

== Family history ==
As a child, Jacks attended school in Charles County, Maryland; Jacks told police that she had left school in the sixth grade, but during her trial her mother, Mamie Jacks, said Banita had dropped out in the tenth grade when she was seventeen years old and pregnant with her first child, Brittany Jacks. After having her second child, Tatianna Jacks, Banita met Nathaniel Fogle in 2000, while she was working as a hairdresser, and subsequently gave birth to N'Kiah and Aja Fogle. In 2005, Jacks and her four daughters lived with Mamie Jacks for a short time after being evicted, but they moved out when Mamie Jacks refused to allow Fogle to stay with them. The family lived in a variety of places, including a homeless shelter, before a nonprofit organization helped them to move into the Washington, DC, rowhouse in August 2006.

Neighbors and family members described Jacks as a caring and attentive mother until the period following Nathaniel Fogle's death in February 2007. Until Jacks' 2008 arrest, her mother had not seen her or the children since 2005, but said in court that she had no reason to believe the children were in danger, in spite of a 2006 call that she made to the Charles County social services department for information about the girls. Mamie Jacks testified, "I never saw her mistreat the girls, and the girls never complained about her mistreatment." However, LaShawn Ragland, a friend with whom the Jacks/Fogles had lived for several months in 2006, testified about arguments between Brittany and Banita Jacks and Banita's punishing her oldest daughter by denying her food and isolating her from the younger girls. Ragland also said that Jacks and Fogle often allowed their daughters Aja and N'Kiah, aged 3 and 4 years old at the time, to smoke marijuana while their parents laughed. Her boyfriend, Nathaniel Fogle Jr., died of cancer in February 2007.

== Changes in behavior following Fogle's death ==
After Fogle's death, Jacks grew increasingly isolated. Jacks did not attend Fogle's funeral, and family members said Jacks did not tell her daughters that Fogle had died. A neighbor testified that Jacks had taken the neighbor's daughter to McDonald's along with Jacks' own children in March 2007, and that Jacks' daughters were always "clean and their hair was always done"; when the neighbor saw Jacks again a month later, her children were wearing white T-shirts and rags on their head. Jacks told the neighbor that the family's food stamps had run out but she was reluctant to apply for more, due to the paperwork required. Fogle's mother said that after her son's funeral, she had come by the Jacks home several times to see her grandchildren, but Jacks either would not let her in or would call and tell her not to return.

Brittany Jacks' boyfriend Leepoy Kelly testified that he saw Brittany for the last time in March 2007, after Brittany had been absent from school for about a month, and that she "seemed a little sad." After their brief visit, Brittany stopped responding to Kelly's calls to her cellphone or messages to her MySpace account.

In April and May 2007, Brittany Jacks' social worker Kathy Lopes made repeated attempts to verify Brittany's safety. At the time, Lopes was an employee of Booker T. Washington Charter School, which Brittany attended. On April 27, Lopes visited the Jacks home with a police officer and another school employee, but Banita Jacks refused to allow them inside; Lopes testified that she saw the two younger girls in the living room and that they appeared unkempt. Over the next few days, Lopes made repeated calls to CFSA as well as to the police.

As a result of Lopes' call, police sergeant James Lafranchise visited the Jacks home on April 30, 2007, and interviewed Banita Jacks in her front yard. Lafranchise did not file a report of the visit until January 9, 2008, on the day that the girls' bodies were discovered. (At the time the visit was made, such reports were not required; a rule requiring reports when checking on the welfare of a resident was instituted in the wake of the Jacks case.) In the initial report, Lafranchise said that he had seen only the three younger girls on his visit; he filed a follow-up report on January 13 that said he "thought" he had seen Brittany as well. He reported during the homicide investigation that the girls, including Brittany, appeared "clean and well fed, healthy and playful." When questioned at Jacks' trial, Lafranchise said that he had not seen Brittany at the house; he said that he had not been told to look for a teenager and assumed he was there to check on the three younger girls, even though he spoke with Lopes on his cell phone while he was at the Jacks home. The D.C. police department said that they would be conducting an internal investigation of Lafranchise and the inconsistent reports.

On May 10, Lopes wrote a letter to the youth social service division of D.C. Superior Court, expressing her fear that Brittany Jacks was "being held hostage." Social workers did not investigate her concerns.

In May 2007, Jacks moved all the furniture from her house into the backyard and started losing weight. Jacks told another neighbor, whom she often asked for water and cigarettes, that she had cancer. During the summer, Jacks' former neighbors smelled a foul odor in the area, which some guessed was a dead rat.

The last person to see any of the children alive was a neighbor and family friend, Tywana Richardson, who delivered Social Security checks to Jacks twice a month; Richardson said that she saw the two youngest girls in the family's living room in June 2007. Richardson had not seen Brittany Jacks for several months.

== Discovery of bodies and trial ==
On January 9, 2008, federal marshals came to Jacks' home to serve her with eviction. Jacks came to the door wearing only a white T-shirt with brown smudge marks on it and refused to allow them inside. It was later discovered that the brown smudge marks on the white shirt were dried blood. When the US Marshals identified themselves, Jacks attempted to shut and lock the door but Deputy US Marshal Kevin Ruark placed his boot in the door and they forced their way inside the dark home. Deputy US Marshals Kevin Ruark and Nicholas Garrett said they could immediately smell an odor of "rotting meat, like stink bait" which they thought was "rotten or spoiled food." Jacks made an apparent attempt to block or slow down Ruark and Garrett as they made their way up the dark staircase. As they reached the top of the staircase, Ruark could see the bodies of the small children lying in the first bedroom. They were placed side by side and the corpses were in very bad condition, being in an advanced state of decomposition. The bodies of the three younger girls had been lined up according to age, each wearing a white T-shirt. The body of Brittany Jacks was in another upstairs bedroom, nude and lying on the floor in a pool of blood, underneath a white T-shirt.

Medical examiners who examined the bodies determined that the three younger girls had been strangled and that Brittany had been stabbed repeatedly, but due to the bodies' high level of decomposition, examiners were unable to definitively attribute these injuries as causing the girls' deaths. According to Jacks, all four of her daughters had died in their sleep, despite her unsuccessful attempts to revive them.

Jacks' trial on twelve charges, including premeditated first-degree murder, felony murder, and cruelty to children towards each of her four daughters, began on July 15, 2009, in Superior Court of the District of Columbia. Jacks pled not guilty and rejected an insanity defense. The verdict, guilty on all charges except the first degree murder of Brittany Jacks, was decided by the presiding judge, Frederick H. Weisberg.

On December 18, 2009, following her conviction, Jacks was sentenced by Judge Weisberg to 120 years in prison (30 years for each murder). Weisberg rejected a defense motion calling into question Jacks' earlier refusal to use an insanity defense. He also rejected the defense's suggestion that the sentences should run concurrently.

== Other aftermath of incident ==
Two days following the discovery of the dead bodies of the Jacks-Fogle children, mayor Adrian Fenty announced findings of a preliminary investigation of District agency involvement and previewed reforms to take place in District government operations in response to the tragedy.

In April 2009, the D.C. Office of the Inspector General released a report implicating not only the CFSA, but several other local government parties for failing to meet their obligations in the Jacks case and potentially prevent the four deaths. The Washington Post reported:

The family was supposed to receive monthly visits based on its housing placement; it never did. The school system didn't follow through when the girls dropped out of school. Police didn't fully investigate when they were called to the house. And health-care providers did not follow up on things that should have been red flags, according to the report.

The report also faulted an overall lack of coordination and communication between the various agencies involved with the family. To enhance agency communication and coordination, mayor Adrian Fenty proposed legislation which was passed into law. This legislation amended the District of Columbia confidentiality rules to make them less rigid and more aligned with what is permitted under federal privacy laws such as HIPAA and FERPA.

In mid-2008, the foreclosed home where the Jacks family lived and the bodies were found was put up for sale. Assessed at a value of $220,610, the house was listed with a selling price of $163,000 in September 2008, which slid downward to $90,900 by February 2009. The home went up for bank auction in March 2009.
