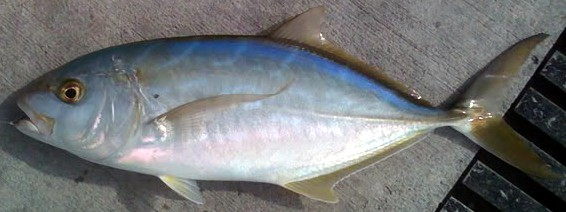

Conservation status
- Least Concern (IUCN 3.1)

Scientific classification
- Kingdom: Animalia
- Phylum: Chordata
- Class: Actinopterygii
- Division: Teleostei
- Order: Carangiformes
- Suborder: Carangoidei
- Family: Carangidae
- Genus: Caranx
- Species: C. bartholomaei

Binomial name
- Caranx bartholomaei G. Cuvier, 1833
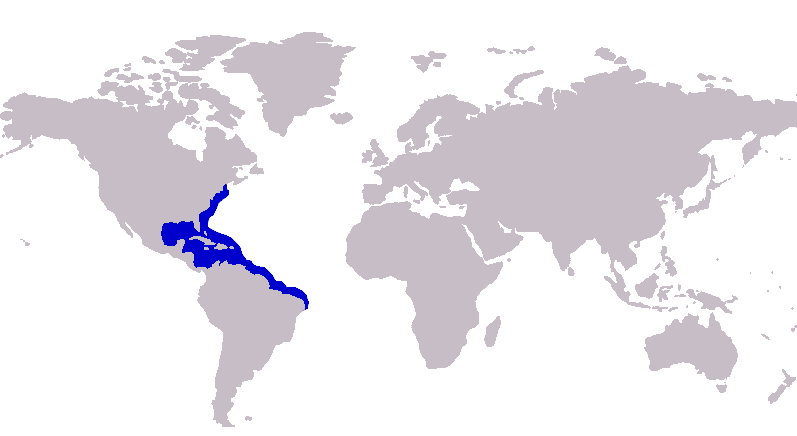
- Approximate range of the yellow jack

Synonyms
- Carangoides bartholomaei, (Cuvier, 1833); Citula bartholomaei (Cuvier, 1833)

= Yellow jack =

Species of fish

The yellow jack (Caranx bartholomaei), also known as coolihoo, is a species of marine fish in the jack family, Carangidae. It is one of only two representatives of its genus present in the Atlantic Ocean, inhabiting waters off the east coast of the Americas from Massachusetts in the north to Brazil in the south, as well as a number of offshore islands. The yellow jack can be distinguished from closely related species by the length of the jaw, as well as counts of the rays in the fins. It is a fairly large fish, growing to a recorded maximum length of 1 metre (39 in), and a weight of at least 14 kilograms (31 lb). Yellow jack inhabit reefs, moving either individually or in schools and are predatory fish which primarily take other small fish. Studies in the Caribbean suggest the species reaches sexual maturity between 23 and 32 centimetres (9.1 and 12.6 in), and spawns in offshore waters from February to October. Yellow jack are of minor economic importance, taken by both hook and net methods, and are considered to be fair table fish. They are often caught by boat anglers, although are overlooked for their larger relatives.

== Taxonomy and naming ==
The yellow jack is classified within the genus Caranx, a group of fish commonly called jacks and trevallies. Caranx falls into the jack and horse mackerel family Carangidae, the Carangidae are part of the order Carangiformes.

The species was first scientifically described by the famed French taxonomist Georges Cuvier in 1833, based on the holotype specimen collected from St. Bartholomew Island in the West Indies. Cuvier named this new species Caranx bartholomaei after the island from which the holotype was taken. The genus in which the taxon should be placed has proved contentious, and continues to be today with a number of recent publications placing the species in Carangoides, while others still classify it within Caranx. This article follows the Fishbase and ECoF classification of Caranx bartholomaei. The species predominant common name, "yellow jack", comes from the colour the species turns as it gets older, with other common names including "coolihoo" and incorrectly, "green jack".

Some authorities place the yellow jack in the genus Caranx.

== Description ==
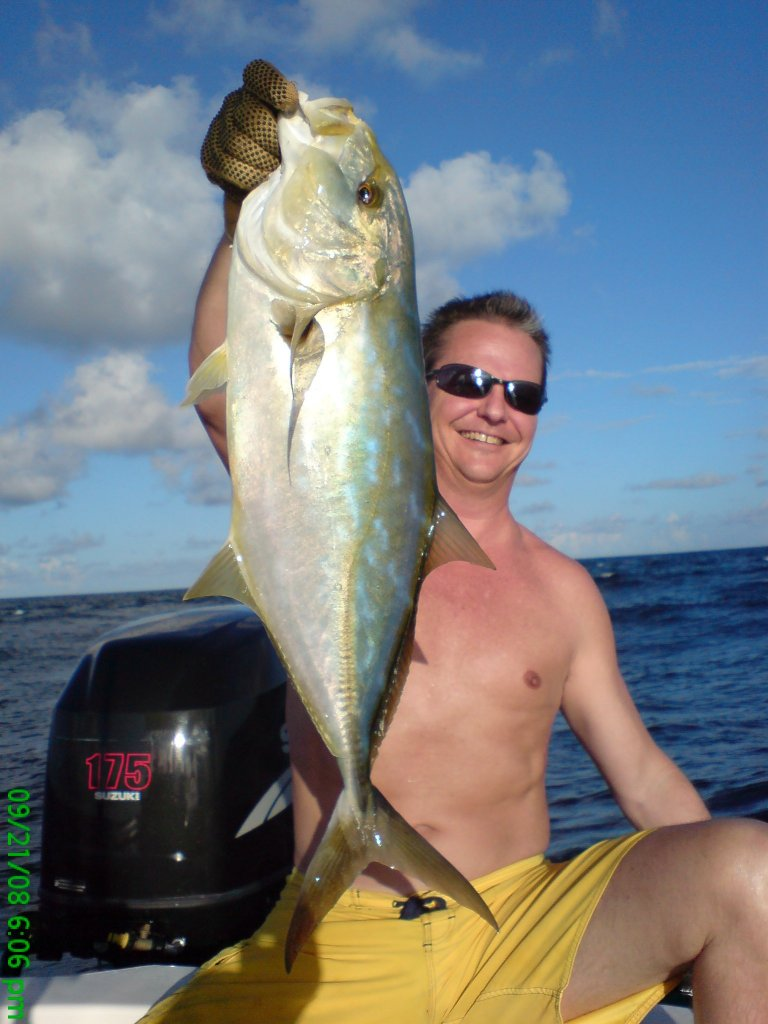
A Yellow Jack caught by a recreational fisherman

The yellow jack shows the typical body profile of the genus Carangoides, having a moderately deep, compressed elongate shape, with the dorsal profile slightly more convex than the ventral profile. It is a large fish, growing to a known maximum length of 1 metre (39 in), although more common seen below 45 centimetres (18 in), and a maximum weight of 14 kilograms (31 lb). The dorsal profile of the head is slightly curved from the snout to the nape, with the eye having a moderately well developed adipose eyelid. One of the major diagnostic features is that the upper jaw does not reach to the interior margin of the eye. Both jaws contain narrow bands of villiform teeth, with these bands becoming wider anteriorly. The dorsal fin is in two parts, the first containing seven spines and the second of one spine followed by 25 to 28 soft rays. The anal fin is similar to the second dorsal fin, consisting of two anteriorly detached spines followed by one spine and 21 to 24 soft rays. The lobes of the dorsal and anal fins are slightly pronounced, and the pectoral fin is falcate, being longer than the head. The lateral line has a slight, extended anterior curve, with this curved section being longer than the posterior straight section. The straight section of the lateral line has 22 to 28 scutes, with rest of the body being covered in smooth cycloid scales, and the chest being completely scaled. The caudal peduncle has bilateral paired keels present. There are 24 vertebrae and a total of 24 to 30 gill rakers.

The yellow jack is a pale yellow-green-blue dorsally, becoming silver on the underside. Juveniles show around five vertical bands, which fade to blotches and finally disappear altogether as the fish matures. The fins are all hyaline in appearance, often with a golden-brown tinge to them. Older fish tend to be more yellow, with large specimens having bright yellow fins.

== Distribution and habitat ==
The yellow jack is distributed throughout the tropical to subtropical western Atlantic Ocean, ranging on the coast of America from Massachusetts to Maceio, Brazil. The species range includes hundreds of offshore islands in the eastern Atlantic, including Bermuda, the Bahamas, the West Indies and throughout the Caribbean Sea. Along with the bar jack, C. ruber, it is only one of two species formerly in Carangoides present in the Atlantic, with all others having Indo-Pacific distributions. it also can be found in the Libyan coast (in the Mediterranean sea). The yellow jack is occasionally found in inshore coastal waters, but prefers offshore reefs and islands, or open marine waters over the continental shelf. Whilst not often seen in shallow waters near the American continent, yellow jack are commonly seen in the sandy shallows of a number of Caribbean islands foraging with other species.

== Biology ==
A pair of yellow jack caught by recreational fishermen

Yellow jack are predatory fish, moving both individually or in small groups, with their main prey being small fish, although observational records also show smaller benthic prey is taken. Yellow jack have been observed in a 'following role', moving around with larger species to take advantage of the commotion caused by the bigger fish, allowing the jack to opportunistically forage or take scraps left by the larger fish. As well as other teleosts, yellow jack have also been recorded following eels, stingrays and nurse sharks. In one case, they were observed following a flying gurnard, itself smaller than the jack, that disturbed the substrate, causing various organisms to be displaced and become available for predation. As well as being 'followers', larger specimens have also been observed as the 'followed' species. The species has also been observed living in close relationships with spinner dolphins, feeding off the dolphin's waste products. This behavior has also been observed in a number of other jacks living in the region.

Yellow jacks reach maturity at different times in different locations, with studies around Cuba showing males reach sexual maturity at 30 centimetres (12 in) and females at 32 centimetres (13 in), while in Jamaica, males reach sexual maturity at 23 centimetres (9.1 in). Spawning takes place in offshore waters between February and October. Observational studies in Belize have shown that although courtship occurs in pairs, the species is a group spawner, congregating in large balls of around 300 fish, with spawning occurring mostly before sunset. Juveniles live near the surface of the ocean, often hiding amongst large mats of jellyfish or Sargassum weed, with a coloration that camouflages the fish in the weed. These young fish are often moved long distances by the Gulf Stream, and this is probably the process responsible for fish found as far north as Massachusetts.

== Relationship to humans ==
Yellow jack are a minor commercial species throughout their range, taken by seines, trawls and hook and line techniques. They are also caught by recreational fishermen, with fish baits and lures and often while trolling, although they are rarely targeted specifically. The species is rated as a fair to good table fish, and is marketed both fresh and salted. Yellow jack are known to be carriers of ciguatera around the West Indies, and are classified as a high risk species, with their predatory nature allowing the toxin to accumulate in their flesh. The yellow jack was actually the first species outside of the Pacific Ocean to be confirmed as carrying ciguatera toxins, although these early studies showed that the toxin was biochemically slightly different from the Pacific strain.
