= Bone Orchard =

- Origin: Brighton, England
- Genres: Post-punk, gothic rock
- Years active: 1983–1986
- Labels: Jungle, Vax
- Past members: Chrissie McGee; Mark Horse; Troy Tyro; Paul Hendrickson; Mick Finch; Tim Huthert; Ben Tisdall; Adrian Harris

Bone Orchard were a post-punk/gothic rock band from Brighton, England, active between around 1983 and 1986.

== History ==
The band was formed in 1983 by Chrissie McGee (vocals), Mark Horse (guitar), Troy Tyro (guitar), Paul Henrickson (bass), and Mick Finch (drums). They played their first gig in April that year in London, and recorded a session for John Peel's BBC Radio 1 programme in June 1983 before releasing a record, subsequently signing to the Jungle label for debut EP Stuffed to the Gills in November that year. The band drew comparisons with The Birthday Party, with McGee compared to Siouxsie Sioux. Finch left, to be replaced on drums by Tim Huthert in early 1984, and the band released a further EP before he left and joined Specimen, he was then replaced by Ben Tisdall, with a single released prior to their debut album, Jack, in September. Tisdall left in 1985, to be replaced with glam punk Adrian Harris, and the band continued with an EP and a critically acclaimed mini-LP, Penthouse Poultry, that year before splitting up.

== Discography ==
=== Albums ===
- Jack (1984), Jungle - UK Indie #18
- Penthouse Poultry (mini) (1985), Vax

=== Singles, EPs ===
- Stuffed to the Gills EP (1983), Jungle
- Swallowing Havoc EP (1984), Jungle
- "Jack" (1984), Jungle
- Princess Epilepsy EP (1985), Jungle
