= Jax Tyres & Auto =

Australian tyre retail chain

JAX Tyres & Auto
- Type: Subsidiary
- Industry: Automotive industry
- Founded: 1949
- Headquarters: Sydney, Australia
- Number of locations: 94 (September 2025)
- Key people: Steve Grossrieder, CEO
- Products: Tyres, wheels, brakes and suspension
- Services: Tyre repair, wheel balancing, wheel alignment, suspension and brake, motor oil change, brake, fluid flushes
- Parent: Hankook
- Website: www.jaxtyres.com.au

JAX Tyres & Auto is a tyre retailer in Australia. The company also provides wheels, brakes, suspension and other services for passenger, 4x4 and commercial vehicles. Since 2017 it has been a subsidiary of Hankook.

== History ==
The company was founded in 1949 and opened its first store in Sydney. After the company's initial inception, it did not take long for JAX Tyres & Auto to grow and they opened several franchise stores. JAX Tyres & Auto was first established to supply only tyres, however from 1986, the company expanded its services from a tyre and wheel focused company to offer brakes and suspension servicing. In 2005, JAX Tyres & Auto merged with Quick Fit Tyres, which operated in Victoria and Queensland.

As of September 2025, JAX Tyres & Auto has 94 stores in Australia. All are operated as franchises.

== Services ==
=== Retail ===
JAX Tyres & Auto sells tyres from global manufacturing brands including: BFGoodrich, Bridgestone, Continental, Dunlop, Goodyear, Hankook, Michelin, Pirelli and others.

=== Automotive ===
Like many car repair shops in Australia, JAX Tyres & Auto also offer automotive maintenance and services related to tyre repairs, wheel alignment & balancing, brakes, suspension, and oil changes.

== Acquisition ==
In February 2017, Hankook acquired JAX Tyres & Auto.
