= Ice shove =

Ice pushed onshore due to water movements or wind

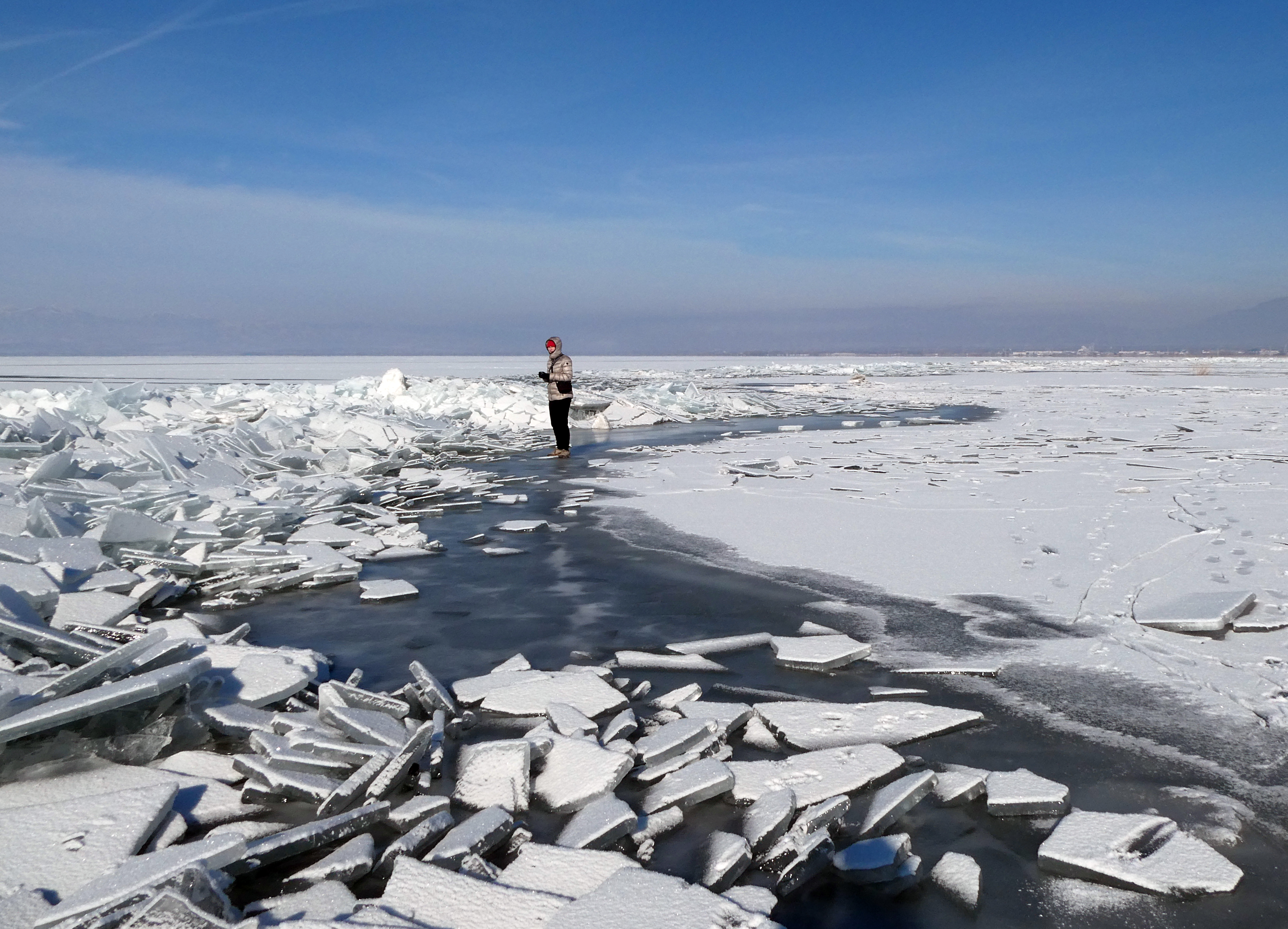
Ice shove on the shore of Utah Lake, December 2020

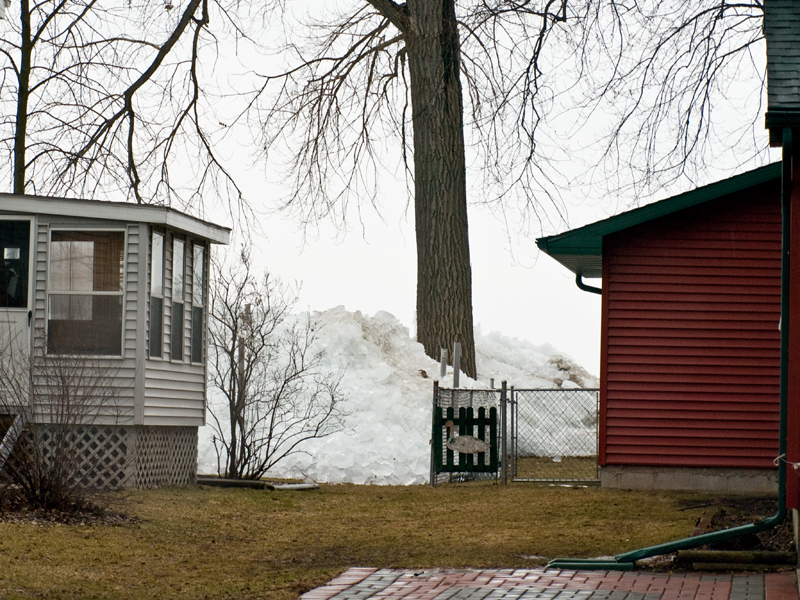
An ice shove on Lake Winnebago in the state of Wisconsin in March 2009

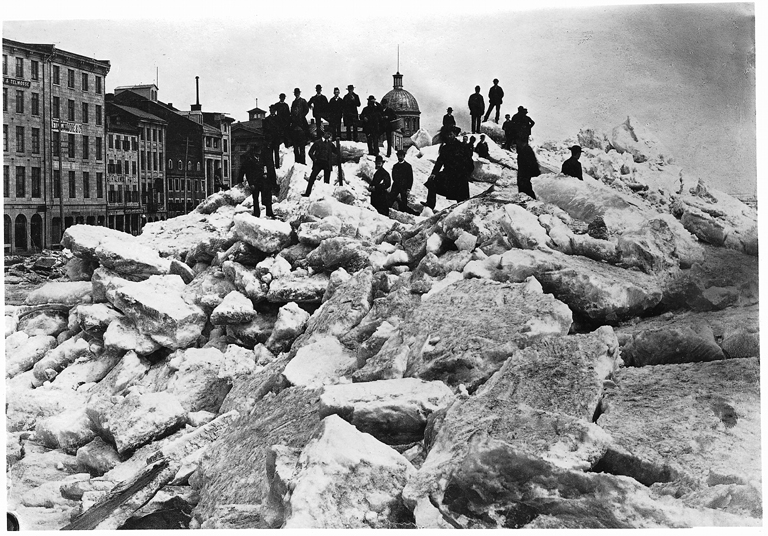
People standing on broken ice from an ice shove that breached the shore in Montreal, Quebec in 1884

An ice shove (also known as fast ice, an ice surge, ice push, ice heave, shoreline ice pileup, ice piling, ice thrust, ice tsunami, ice ride-up, or ivu in Iñupiat) is a surge of ice from an ocean or large lake onto the shore. Ice shoves are caused by ocean currents, strong winds, or temperature differences pushing ice onto the shore, creating piles up to 12 metres (40 feet) high. Ice shoves can be caused by temperature fluctuations, wind action, or changing water levels and can cause devastation to coastal Arctic communities. Cyclical climate change will also play a role in the formation and frequency of ice shove events; a rise in global temperatures leads to more open water to facilitate ice movement. Low pressure systems will destabilize ice sheets and send them shoreward. Also referred to as "landfast ice", it is an essential component to the coastal sea ice system, including the sediment dynamics. Arctic peoples utilize these ice shoves to travel and hunt. Ringed seals, an important prey for polar bears, are specifically adapted to maintain breathing holes in ice shoves, which lack the same openings usually used by marine mammals in drifting ice packs. The mere fact that the Ringed seal is uniquely adapted to utilizing ice shoves for breathing holes, and that polar bears have adapted to this behaviour for hunting, as well as the fact that the Iñupiat have a distinct term for the phenomena, indicates that ice shoves are a regular and continuing phenomena in the Arctic.

== Causes ==
=== Temperature fluctuations ===
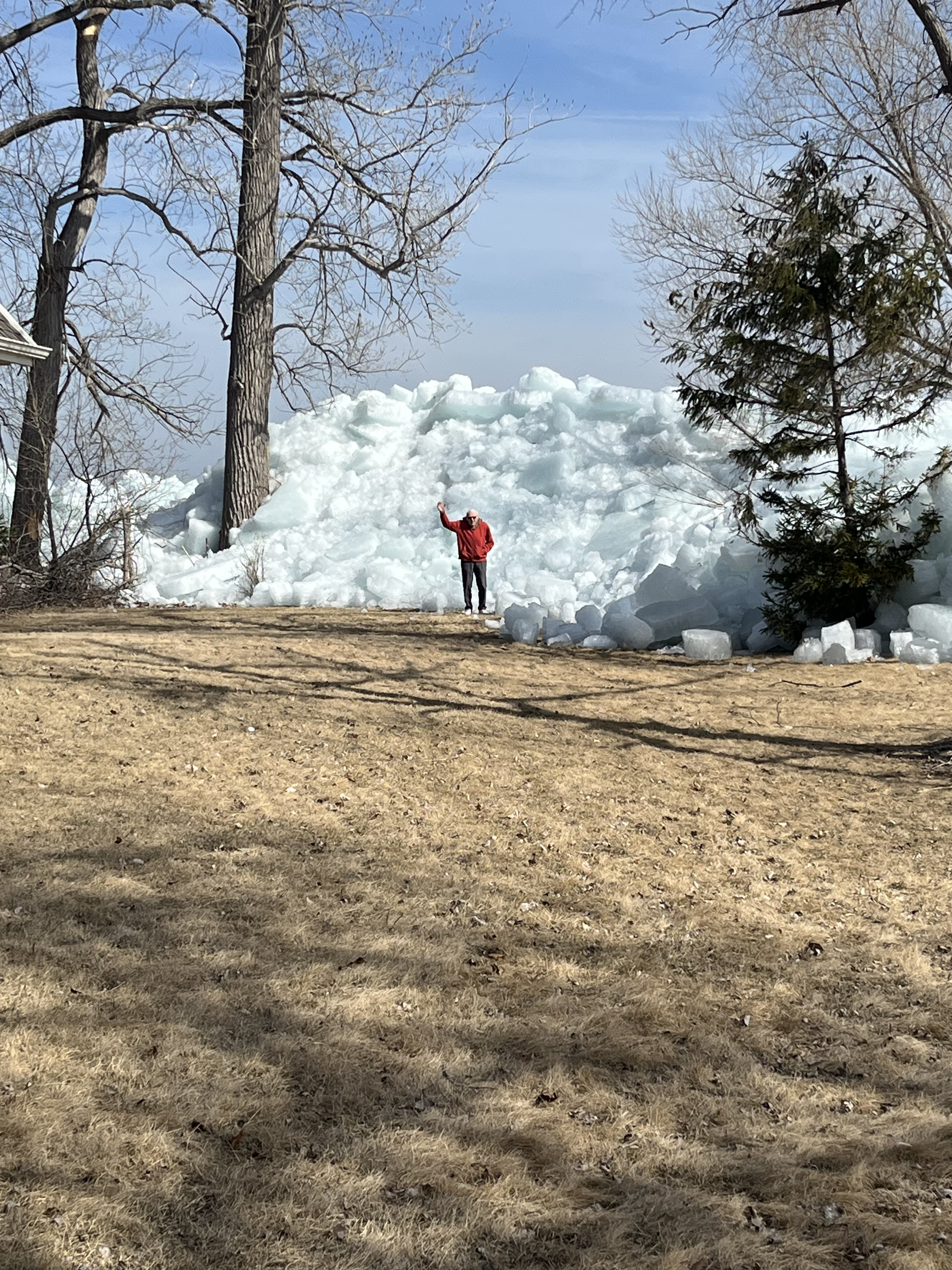
Ice shove on the shore of Lake Winnebago, Oshkosh, WI USA in March 2025.

When temperatures decrease, ice contracts and forms stress fractures; water then seeps into these tension cracks and freezes. When temperatures rise, the ice sheet expands. This sequence of events occurs cyclically until the total ice sheet has expanded considerably. If this ice sheet is in contact with a shoreline, it can exert considerable force on the land, causing the displacement of shore material. When temperature fluctuations are drastic enough, the ice sheet contraction pulls far enough from shore to form a lane of water; for example, a drop from 0 °C to -20 °C results in an 11% volume decrease of a 1.5-km ice sheet. This lane of water subsequently freezes. When temperatures rise at sufficient rates (~1 °C/hr for upwards of 5 hours), the ice sheet expands onto land. The physical composition of the ice itself is also important; ice that has formed from water-soaked snow, known as white ice, hinders the process of thermal ice expansion because its albedo is higher than other forms of ice, resulting in lower thermal conductivity. In order for conditions to facilitate thermal expansion of ice and in turn ice shoves, the ice needs to be susceptible to temperature change, making black ice more suitable for the formation of ice shoves.

=== Wind action ===
Because land heats faster than ice and transfers heat to the adjacent ice, the ice nearest to the shore melts first when temperatures rise. Water then exists between the ice sheet and the shoreline, facilitating the movement of ice sheets when wind acts on them. An open channel of water allows for reduced resistive forces on the ice sheet, increasing the likelihood that an ice shove event can occur. The direction of the wind ultimately directs the motion of the ice shove. The effectiveness of wind as a driving force for ice movement relies on a multitude of factors including the size and shape of the body of water and wind strength. Large, wide-open bodies of water have a greater surface area for wind to act upon compared to smaller, sheltered bodies of water. Persistent, high-speed winds apply more force than slower wind gusts, making them optimal for driving ice sheets ashore.

=== Fluctuating water levels ===
Falling water levels cause a bending force between ice that has already breached the shore and the ice floating immediately offshore. This bending force causes cracks in the ice where water can seep in and freeze. When water levels rise again, the ice experiences compression forces that subsequently push it onto land. This mechanism is comparable to the thermal expansion process described above.

== Effects on arctic communities ==
Arctic communities can be affected by ice shoves. Ice shoves commonly occur along the Chukchi Sea including in Wainwright, Alaska and Barrow, Alaska. Studies have shown that the formation of landfast ice is starting to form later and breakup earlier in the Chukchi and Beaufort seas. More open water days increase the likelihood of destructive coastal events like ice shoves in these regions. Some have described them as 'ice tsunamis', but the phenomenon works like an iceberg. Witnesses have described the shove's sound as being like that of a train or thunder. Ice shoves can damage buildings and plants that are near to the body of water.

== Arctic ice and climate change ==
Simplified flowchart showing effects of Arctic sea ice decline on ice shove event frequency. Regular lines are scientifically robust. Marked lines are subject to open research or reasonable conjecture.

As described above, ice shove events occur due to deformation of land-fast ice, ice that is anchored to the coast. Land-fast ice grows either locally or by merging with drift ice. In the Arctic, the Transpolar Drift Stream and the Beaufort Gyre are mostly responsible for sea ice transport. In the Beaufort Gyre, surface ice transport is westward directed towards the Alaskan coast, hence being a driver in fast ice growth. The last decades a decline in Arctic ice cover has been observed. Land-fast ice forms later and withdraws earlier, leading to more open water days. Open waters lead to longer wind fetch, which in turn produces more energetic waves near coastal zones, increasing fast ice erosion. The loss of sea ice directly results in a lower surface albedo and thus higher Arctic temperatures. These climate change related processes may lead to higher occurrence of ice shove events.

Ice shoves commonly occur in late autumn or early spring, when ice is relatively unstable due to higher temperatures. They can also occur in mid-winter, as shown by the 2016 ice shove event at Cape Espenberg, Alaska. A strong low-pressure area resulted in favourable conditions for an ice shove. Ice shoves can still occur when there are ice-free summers in the Arctic, which studies suggest can happen occasionally as soon as 2050. In the case of no future reduction of carbon dioxide emission it is suggested that ice-free Arctic winters are also possible, potentially leading to a reduction of Arctic ice shove occurrences in those years. However, these temporal changes and their effect on ice shoves are still subject to discussion. This is namely highly dependent on the location and timing of ice-free conditions.

Arctic sea ice decline is also linked to the slowdown of the Atlantic Meridional Overturning Circulation (AMOC) due to fresh water and temperature anomalies. Due to complex ocean-atmosphere interactions, this can lead to higher storm activity in the mid-latitudes.

== Mid-latitudes ==
Ice shoves are not confined to just polar latitudes; they also occur in the mid-latitudes. They commonly affect medium-to-large size lakes in the Upper Midwest of the United States and central Canada, during periods of strong winds with a large fetch.

== See also ==
- Ice jacking – Structural damage caused by freezing water
- Frost heaving – Upwards swelling of soil during freezing
- Surge (glacier) – Event where a glacier can advance substantially
