= Sinnett =

Sinnett may refer to:

- Alfred Percy Sinnett (1840–1921), English author and Theosophist
- Lawrence C. Sinnett (1888–1962), Seaman in the United States Navy, Medal of Honor recipient
- Thomas P. Sinnett (1880–1967), member of the Illinois House of Representatives
- Sinnett Octagon House, historic octagonal house in Muscatine, Iowa built in 1855
- The Mahatma Letters to A.P. Sinnett, book published in 1923 by A. Trevor Barker

== See also ==
- Scinet (disambiguation)
- Sennet (disambiguation)
- Sennett (disambiguation)
- Sinnott
