= Sphyraena intermedia =

Conservation status
- Data Deficient (IUCN 3.1)

Scientific classification
- Kingdom: Animalia
- Phylum: Chordata
- Class: Actinopterygii
- Order: Carangiformes
- Suborder: Centropomoidei
- Family: Sphyraenidae
- Genus: Sphyraena
- Species: S. intermedia

Binomial name
- Sphyraena intermedia Pastore, 2009

Species of barracuda

Sphyraena intermedia is a doubtfully distinct species of barracuda that was described from the Gulf of Taranto in the south of Italy in 2009. It is intermediate in size between European barracuda (S. sphyraena) and yellowmouth barracuda (S. viridensis). They were distinguished by size and a few other differences such as different amounts of scales and certain body measurements, but is not a hybrid between the two species.

== Taxonomy ==
The binomial proposed by the author is preoccupied by a fossil species described in 1889 by Francesco Bassani. Therefore the latterly described name is invalidated and made unavailable by the ICZN under Article 57.2.
