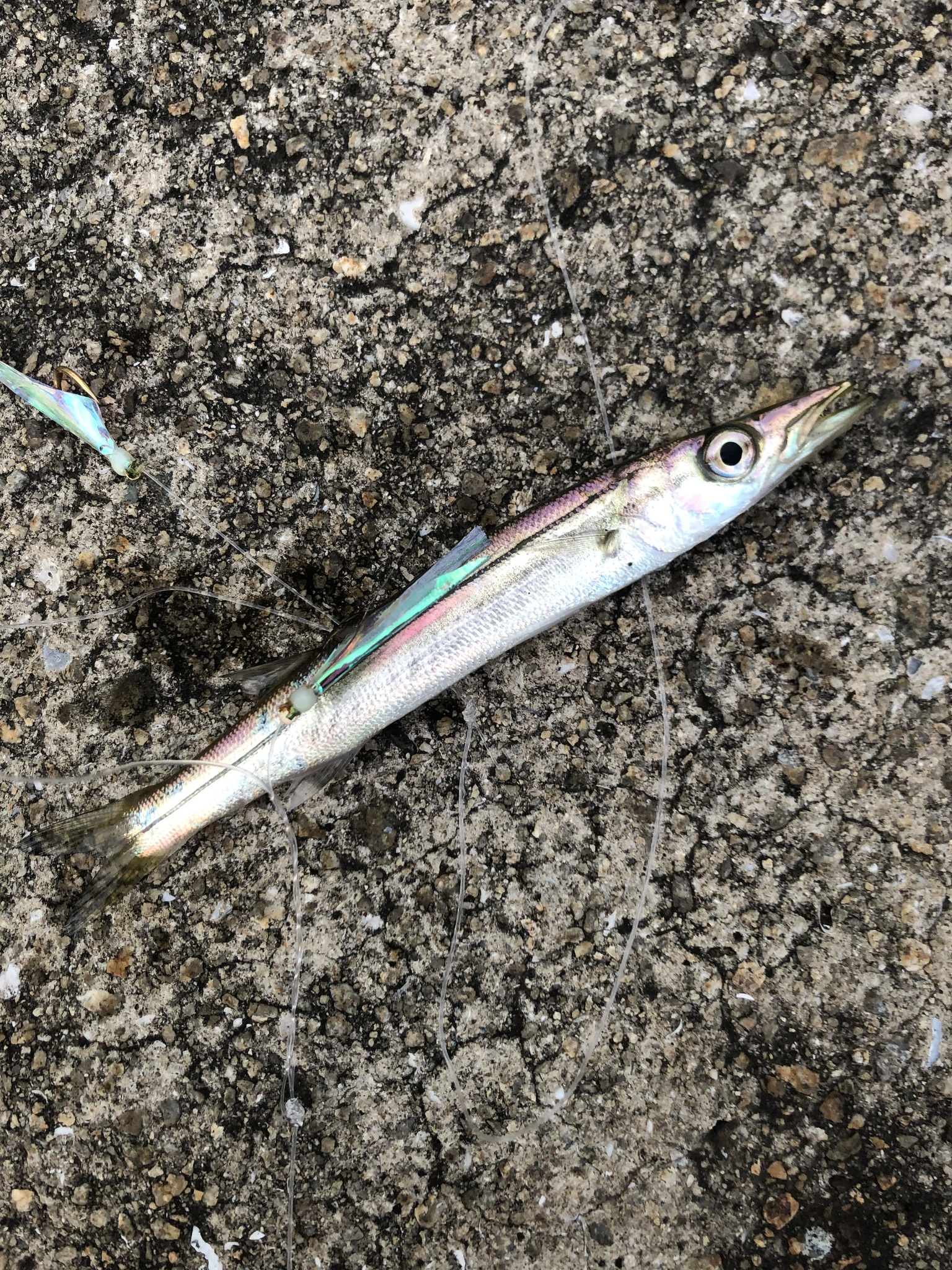

Scientific classification
- Kingdom: Animalia
- Phylum: Chordata
- Class: Actinopterygii
- Order: Carangiformes
- Suborder: Centropomoidei
- Family: Sphyraenidae
- Genus: Sphyraena
- Species: S. chrysotaenia

Binomial name
- Sphyraena chrysotaenia Klunzinger, 1884

Synonyms
- Sphyraenella chrysotaenia (Klunzinger, 1884)

= Sphyraena chrysotaenia =

Species of fish

Sphyraena chrysotaenia, also known as the yellowstripe barracuda, is a species of predatory, ray finned fish from the family Sphyraenidae which is found in the Indo-West Pacific region. It has entered the Mediterranean Sea from the Red Sea through the Suez Canal as a Lessepesian migrant and is now an important species in the fisheries of the eastern Mediterranean.

== Description ==
Sphyraena chrysotaenia has a very elongated, torpedo-shaped body, typical of the barracudas, with two well-separated dorsal fins; the first dorsal fin has with five spiny rays, with the first ray being the longest and the rays progressively decrease in size. The second dorsal fin has its origin in front of the origin of the anal fin. The tail is markedly forked. The pectoral fin sits directly below the origin of the first dorsal fin with the pelvic fin below it. The large head is conical with large eyes, a pointed snout and a slightly projecting lower jaw. The jaws and palate are lines with large canine-shaped teeth which vary in size. The small scales are cycloid in form and the lateral line is almost straight. The preoperculum is covered in scales and its lower posterior margin is concave. They are coloured brown-grey above and silvery below, a dusky stripe runs from the snout through centre of the eye, above the base of the pectoral fin to base of the tail, this stripe may show a yellowish tint on the head. The distal portion of first dorsal and caudal fins is blackish, the second dorsal, pectoral and base of the caudal fins are yellowish. They have been recorded to measure 32 cm (13 in) as a standard length, but average at 20–25 cm (7.9–9.8 in).

== Distribution ==
Sphyraena chrysotenia has an Indo-West Pacific distribution occurring from the Red Sea and Madagascar east through the Indian Ocean to China and northern Australia. It was first recorded in the Mediterranean Sea off Palestine in 1931, and is now spreading westward, having reached Malta by 1993 and the south Adriatic Sea by 2001.

== Biology ==
Sphyraena chrysotenia forms large schools in inshore waters in the pelagic and demersal zones to a depth of 50 m (160 ft). It is piscivorous, catching its food near the bottom and feeds mainly on schooling fish such as Sardinella aurita and Engraulis encrasicolus, but will also feed on crustaceans. The spawning season in the Mediterranean runs from April to September, or August to November in the central Mediterranean. The eggs and fry are planktonic and the juveniles are often recorded in very shallow waters. S. chrysotaenia is a relatively short-lived species, with a maximum age of 5 years old. S. chrysotaenia reaches sexual maturity at a total length of 195 mm (7.7 in) for females and 197.1 mm (7.76 in) for males, usually at 2 years of age.

An analysis of the parasites of S. chrysotenia in the Mediterranean showed that the fish, after its invasion of this sea, lost at least two parasite species, co-introduced three parasite species and acquired six native parasite species from its native congener Sphyraena sphyraena.

== Fisheries ==
Sphyraena chrysotenia is now the most common species of barracuda caught by artisanal fisheries in Lebanon, outnumbering the other landed species by 70%. It can be caught in considerable quantities in inshore waters using purse-seine nets, gillnets and by trawling. It was first recorded in the Gulf of Gabes, Tunisia in 2002 and formed an important part of the total fishery as of 2007. In the Gulf of Suez, studies showed indications of overexploitation of the stock as fish being landed were too small to be sexually mature.
