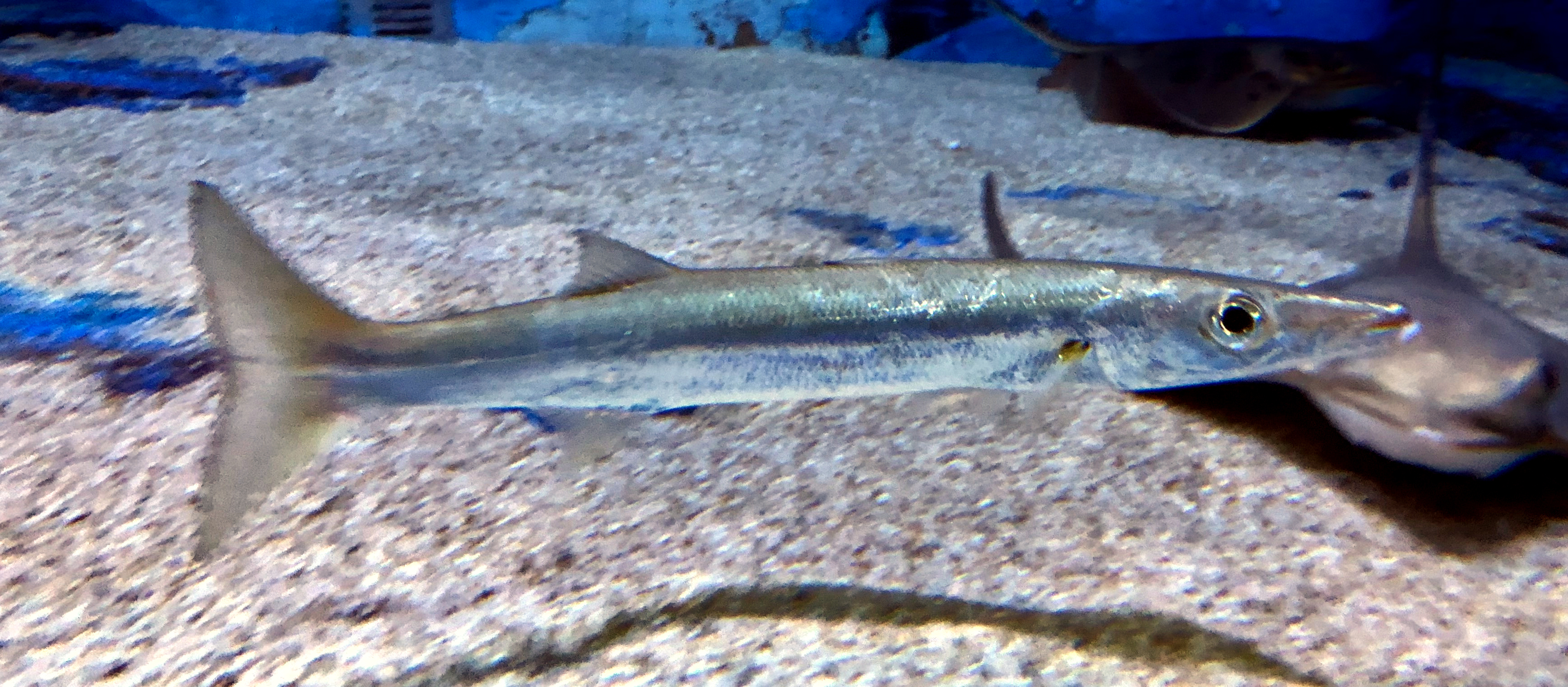

Conservation status
- Least Concern (IUCN 3.1)

Scientific classification
- Kingdom: Animalia
- Phylum: Chordata
- Class: Actinopterygii
- Order: Carangiformes
- Suborder: Centropomoidei
- Family: Sphyraenidae
- Genus: Sphyraena
- Species: S. pinguis

Binomial name
- Sphyraena pinguis Günther, 1874

= Sphyraena pinguis =

Species of ray-finned fish

Sphyraena pinguis commonly known as the red barracuda, striped barracuda, brown barracuda, and more names, is a species of barracuda found in the Northwest Pacific Ocean, from Southeast Asia up through Japan. It is a pelagic species commonly found in large schools over muddy or sandy rock bottoms from southern Japan to Australia. They can commonly be found inhabiting large estuaries and coastal bays and juveniles can be found in shallow waters. Red barracuda feed on smaller fish and can get up to 50 cm (20 in) long.
