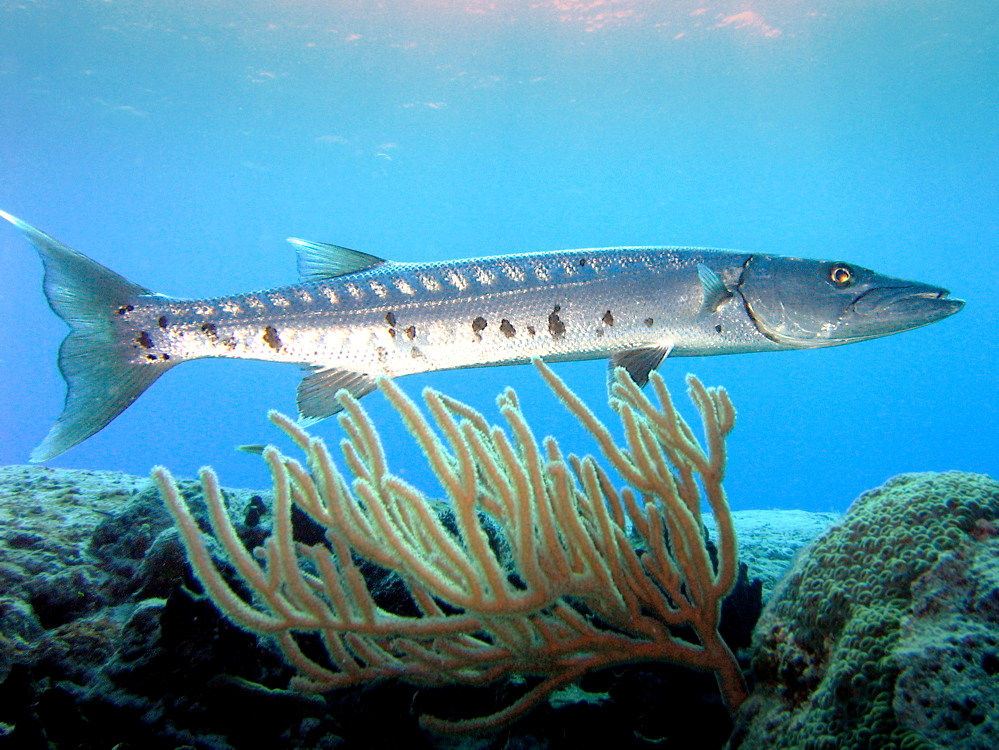
- Great barracuda hovering in the current at the Paradise Reef, Cozumel, Mexico

Scientific classification
- Kingdom: Animalia
- Phylum: Chordata
- Class: Actinopterygii
- Division: Teleostei
- Order: Carangiformes
- Suborder: Centropomoidei
- Family: Sphyraenidae; Rafinesque, 1815
- Genus: Sphyraena; J. T. Klein, 1778

Type species
- Esox spet (Linnaeus, 1758)

Synonyms
- List: Sphyrena Artedi, 1793 (Missp.); Acus Plumier in Lacépède, 1803 (Unav.); Sphyroena Duméril, 1805 (Missp.); Sphaerina Swainson, 1839 (Missp.); Sphraena De Kay, 1842 (Missp.); Agrioposphyraena Fowler, 1903; Australuzza Whitley, 1947; Callosphyraena Smith, 1956; Indosphyraena Smith, 1956; Sphyraenella Smith, 1956

= Barracuda =

Barracuda Temporal range: Early Eocene to present

Genus of fish

A barracuda is a large, predatory, ray-finned, saltwater fish of the genus Sphyraena, the only genus in the family Sphyraenidae, which was named by Constantine Samuel Rafinesque in 1815. It is found in tropical and subtropical oceans worldwide ranging from the eastern border of the Atlantic Ocean to the Red Sea, on its western border the Caribbean Sea, and in tropical areas of the Pacific Ocean. Barracudas reside near the top of the water and near coral reefs and sea grasses. Barracudas are often targeted by sport-fishing enthusiasts.

== Etymology ==
The common name "barracuda" is derived from Spanish, with the original word being of possibly Cariban origin.

== Description ==
Barracudas have a single large caniniform tooth at the tip of the lower jaw, which fits into a notch in the upper jaw

Barracuda have elongated bodies and prominent, sharp-edged, fang-like teeth of varying sizes, set in sockets of their large jaws. They carry a striking resemblance to pike, although they are not related. They have large, pointed heads with an underbite in many species. Their gill covers have no spines and are covered with small scales. Their two dorsal fins are widely separated, with the anterior fin having five spines, and the posterior fin having one spine and nine soft rays. The posterior dorsal fin is similar in size to the anal fin and is situated above it. The lateral line is prominent and extends straight from head to tail. The spinous dorsal fin is placed above the pelvic fins and is normally retracted in a groove. The caudal fin is moderately forked with its posterior edge double-curved and is set at the end of a stout peduncle. The pectoral fins are placed low on the sides. The swim bladder is large, allowing for minimal energy expenditure while cruising or remaining idle.

Unlike pike which have a superficially similar body plan, barracuda have two dorsal fins

In most cases, barracuda are dark gray, dark green, white, or blue on the upper body, with silvery sides and a chalky-white belly. Coloration varies somewhat between species. For some species, irregular black spots or a row of darker cross-bars occur on each side. Their fins may be yellowish or dusky. Barracudas live primarily in oceans, but certain species, such as the great barracuda, live in brackish water. Due to similarities, sometimes Barracuda is compared with freshwater pike, though the major difference between the two is that Barracuda has two separate dorsal fins, unlike the freshwater pike.

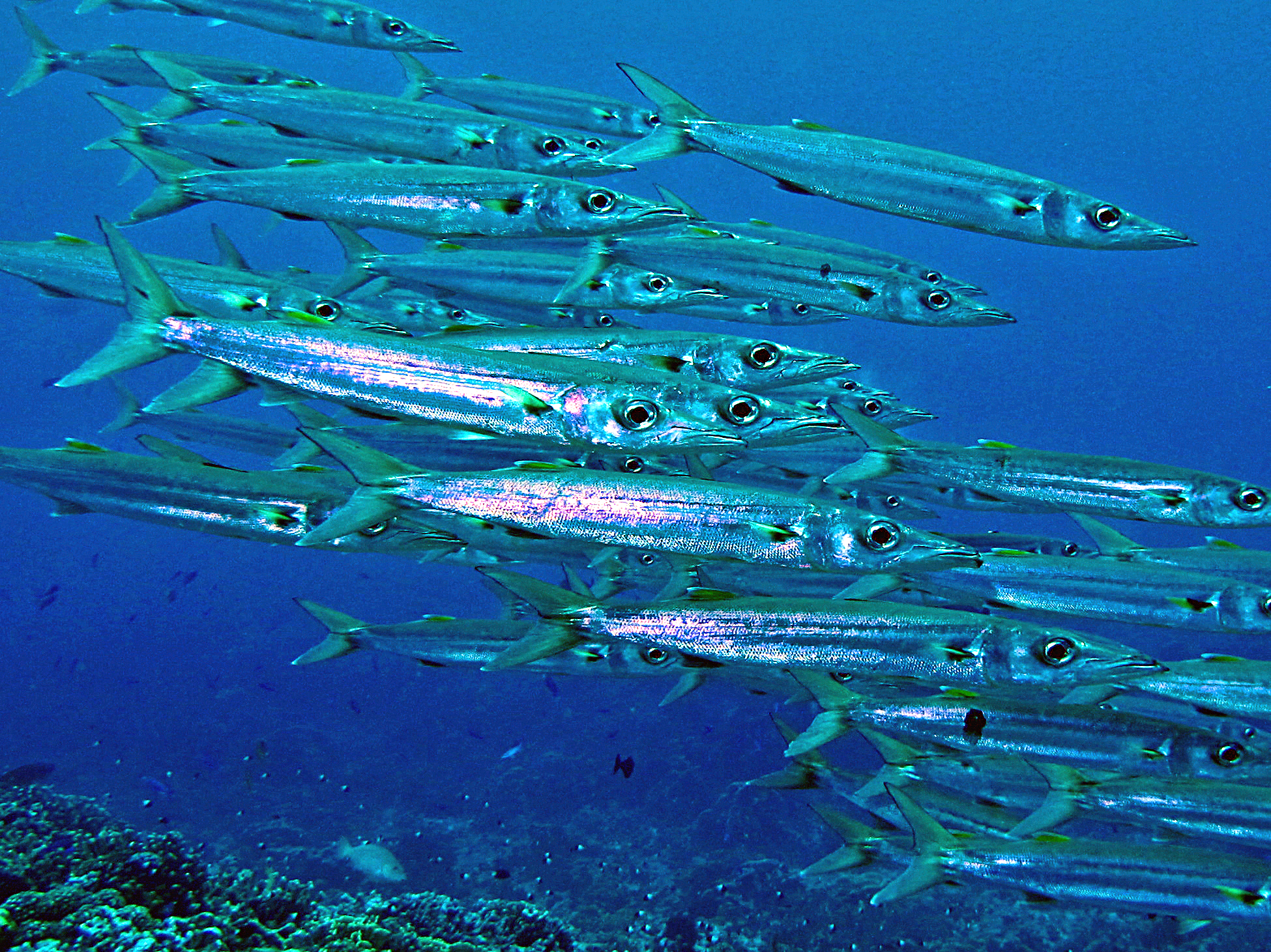
Heller's barracuda (S. helleri)

Some species grow quite large (up to 65 inches or 165 cm in length), such as Sphyraena sphyraena, found in the Mediterranean Sea and eastern Atlantic; Sphyraena picudilla, ranging on the Atlantic coast of tropical America from North Carolina to Brazil and reaching Bermuda. Other barracuda species are found around the world. Examples are Sphyraena argentea, found from Puget Sound southwards to Cabo San Lucas, Sphyraena jello, from the seas of India and the Malay Peninsula and Archipelago.

== Species ==
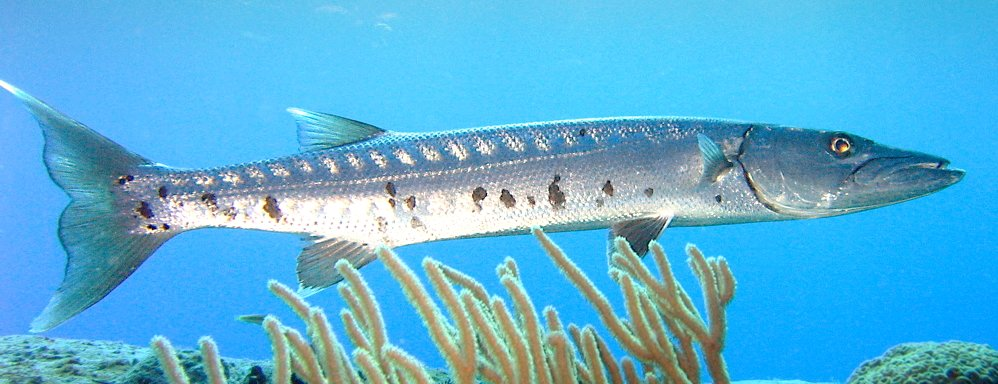
Great barracuda (S. barracuda)

The barracuda genus Sphyraena contains 26 species:

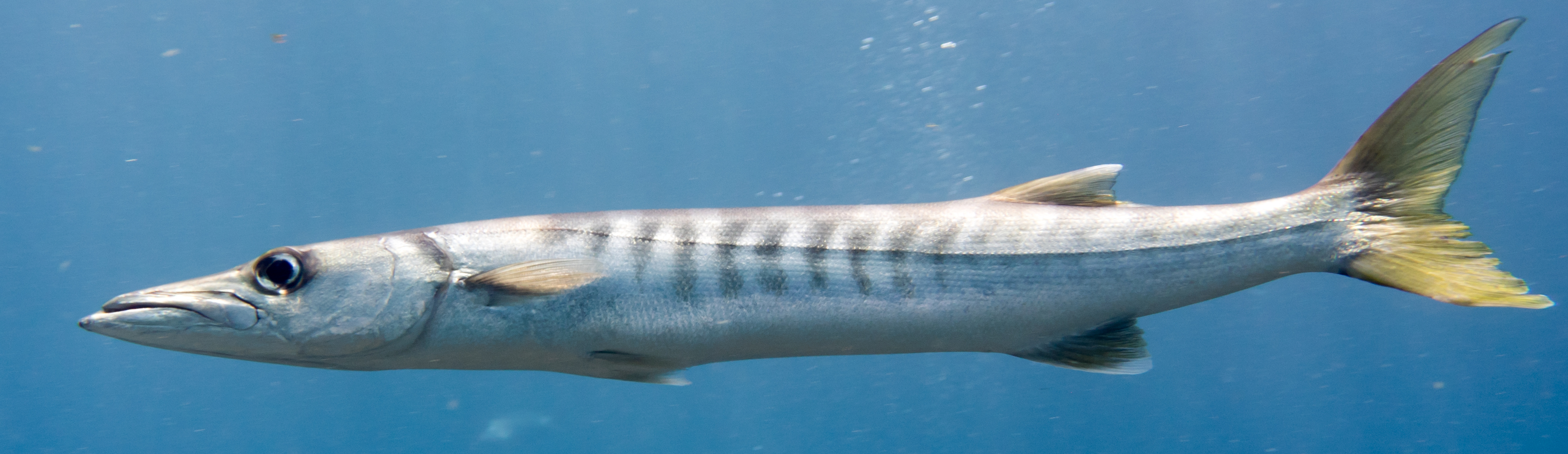
- Pickhandle barracuda (S. jello)
  Sphyraena acutipinnis F. Day, 1876 (Sharpfin barracuda)
- Sphyraena afra W. K. H. Peters, 1844 (Guinean barracuda)
- Sphyraena africana Gilchrist & Thompson, 1909
- Sphyraena arabiansis E. M. Abdussamad, Ratheesh, Thangaraja, Bineesh & D. Prakashan, 2015 (Arabian barracuda)
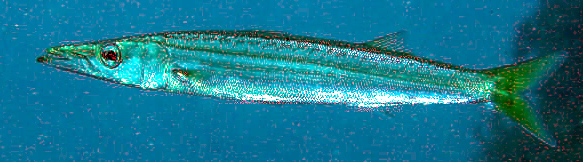
- Japanese barracuda (S. japonica)
  Sphyraena argentea Girard, 1854 (Pacific barracuda)
- Sphyraena barracuda (G. Edwards, 1771) (Great barracuda)
- Sphyraena borealis DeKay, 1842 (Northern sennet)
- Sphyraena ensis D. S. Jordan & C. H. Gilbert, 1882 (Mexican barracuda)
- Sphyraena flavicauda Rüppell, 1838 (Yellowtail barracuda)
- Sphyraena forsteri G. Cuvier, 1829 (Bigeye barracuda)
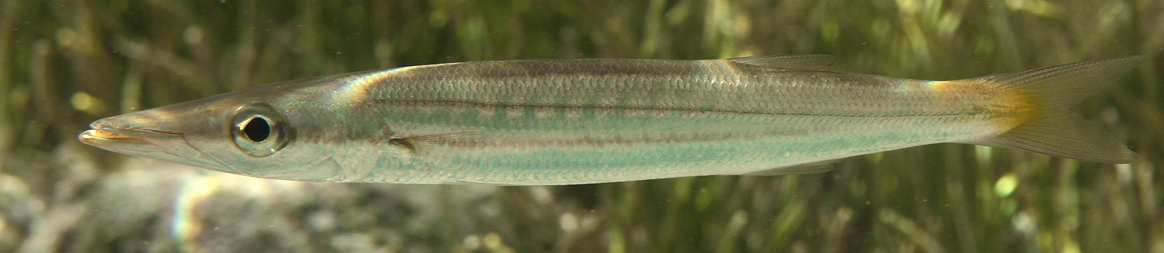
  Obtuse barracuda (S. obtusata)
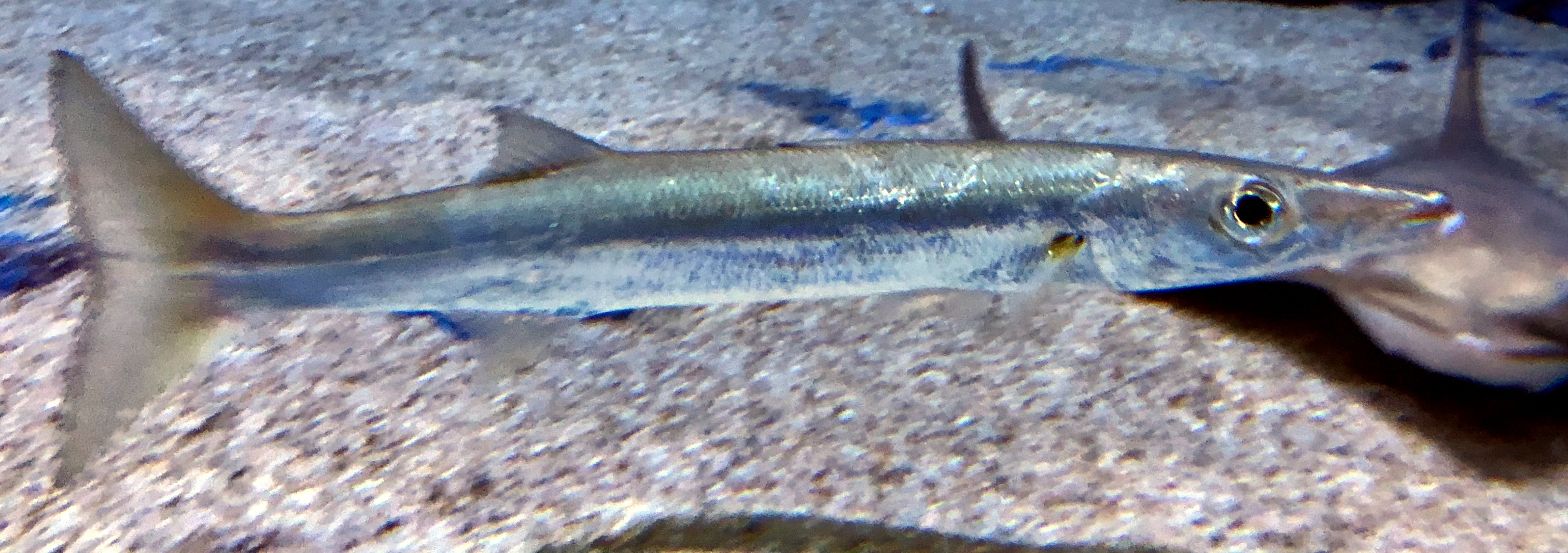
  Red barracuda (Sphyraena pinguis)
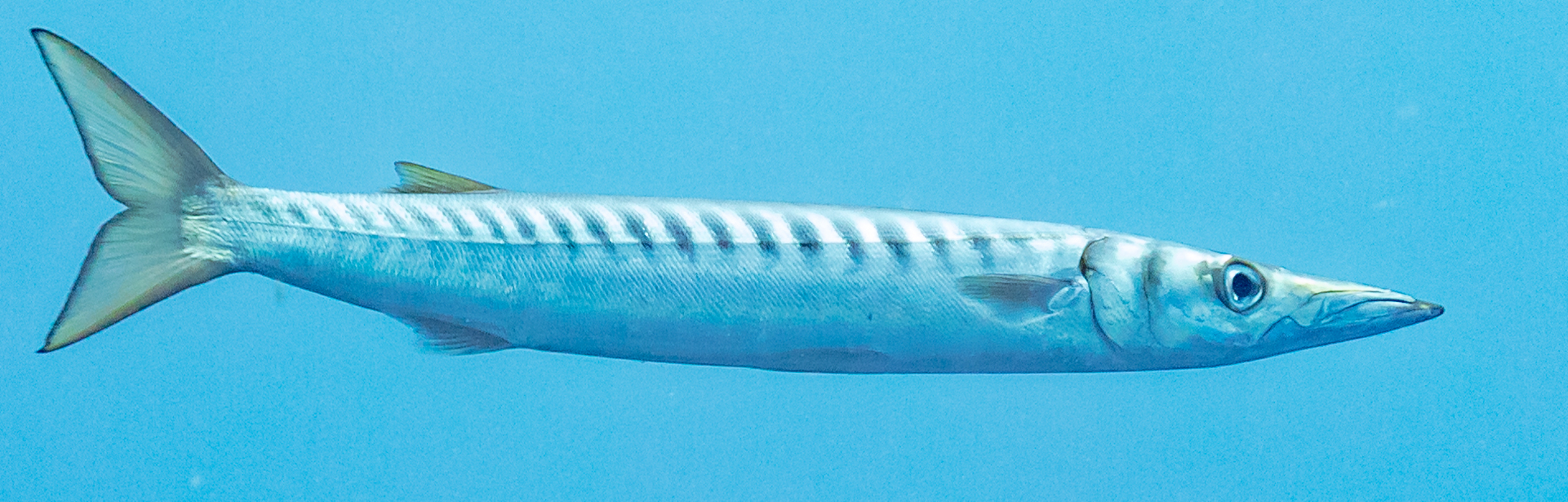
  Yellowmouth barracuda (S. viridensis)
- Sphyraena guachancho G. Cuvier, 1829 (Guachanche barracuda)
- Sphyraena helleri O. T. Jenkins, 1901 (Heller's barracuda)
- Sphyraena iburiensis Doiuchi & Nakabo, 2005
- Sphyraena idiastes Heller & Snodgrass, 1903 (Pelican barracuda)
- Sphyraena jello G. Cuvier, 1829 (Pickhandle barracuda)
- Sphyraena lucasana T. N. Gill, 1863 (Lucas barracuda)
- Sphyraena novaehollandiae Günther, 1860 (Australian barracuda)
- Sphyraena obtusata G. Cuvier, 1829 (Obtuse barracuda)
- Sphyraena pinguis Günther, 1874 (Red barracuda)
- Sphyraena putnamae D. S. Jordan & Seale, 1905 (Sawtooth barracuda)
- Sphyraena qenie Klunzinger, 1870 (Blackfin barracuda)
- Sphyraena sphyraena (Linnaeus, 1758) (European barracuda)
- Sphyraena stellata Morishita & Motomura, 2020
- Sphyraena tome Fowler, 1903
- Sphyraena viridensis G. Cuvier, 1829 (Yellowmouth barracuda)
- Sphyraena waitii W. Ogilby, 1908

Synonyms

- Sphyraena chrysotaenia Klunzinger, 1884 (Yellowstripe barracuda); valid as S. pinguis
- Sphyraena intermedia Pastore, 2009; valid as S. sphyraena or S. viridensis
- Sphyraena japonica Bloch & J. G. Schneider, 1801 (Japanese barracuda); valid as S. acutipinnis
- Sphyraena picudilla Poey, 1860 (Southern sennet); valid as S. borealis

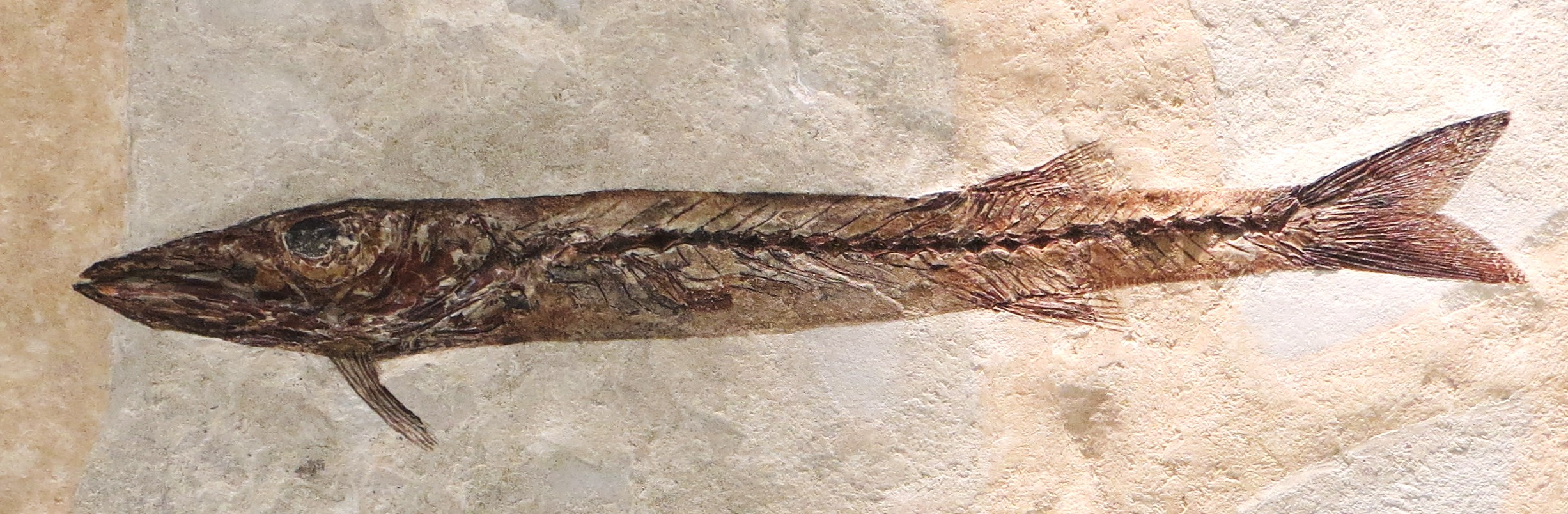
†Sphyraena bolcensis, the earliest known fossil barracuda

The following fossil species are also known:

- †"Sphyraena" amici Agassiz, 1843
- †Sphyraena bognorensis Casier, 1966
- †Sphyraena bolcensis Agassiz, 1844
- †Sphyraena crassidens de Beaufort, 1926
- †Sphyraena croatica Gorjanović-Kramberger, 1882
- †Sphyraena cunhai da Silva Santos & Travassos, 1960
- †Sphyraena egleri da Silva Santos & Travassos, 1960
- †Sphyraena fajumensis (Dames, 1883)
- †Sphyraena hansfuchsi (Schubert, 1906)
- †Sphyraena intermedia Bassani, 1889
- †Sphyraena kugleri Casier, 1966
- †Sphyraena longimana Arambourg, 1966
- †Sphyraena lugardi White, 1926
- †Sphyraena major Leidy, 1855
- †Sphyraena malembeensis Dartevelle & Casier, 1943
- †Sphyraena pannonica Weiler, 1938
- †Sphyraena senni Casier, 1966
- †Sphyraena sternbergensis Winkler, 1875
- †Sphyraena striata Casier, 1946
- †Sphyraena substriata (Münster, 1846)
- †Sphyraena suessi Gorjanović-Kramberger, 1882
- †Sphyraena tsengi Tao, 1993
- †Sphyraena tyrolensis von Meyer, 1863
- †Sphyraena viannai Dartevelle & Casier, 1949
- †"Sphyraena" viennensis Steindachner, 1859
- †Sphyraena weberi Leriche, 1954
- †Sphyraena winkleri Lawley, 1876

A related fossil genus, Parasphyraena, is known from the Miocene of Azerbaijan.

== Behaviour and diet ==
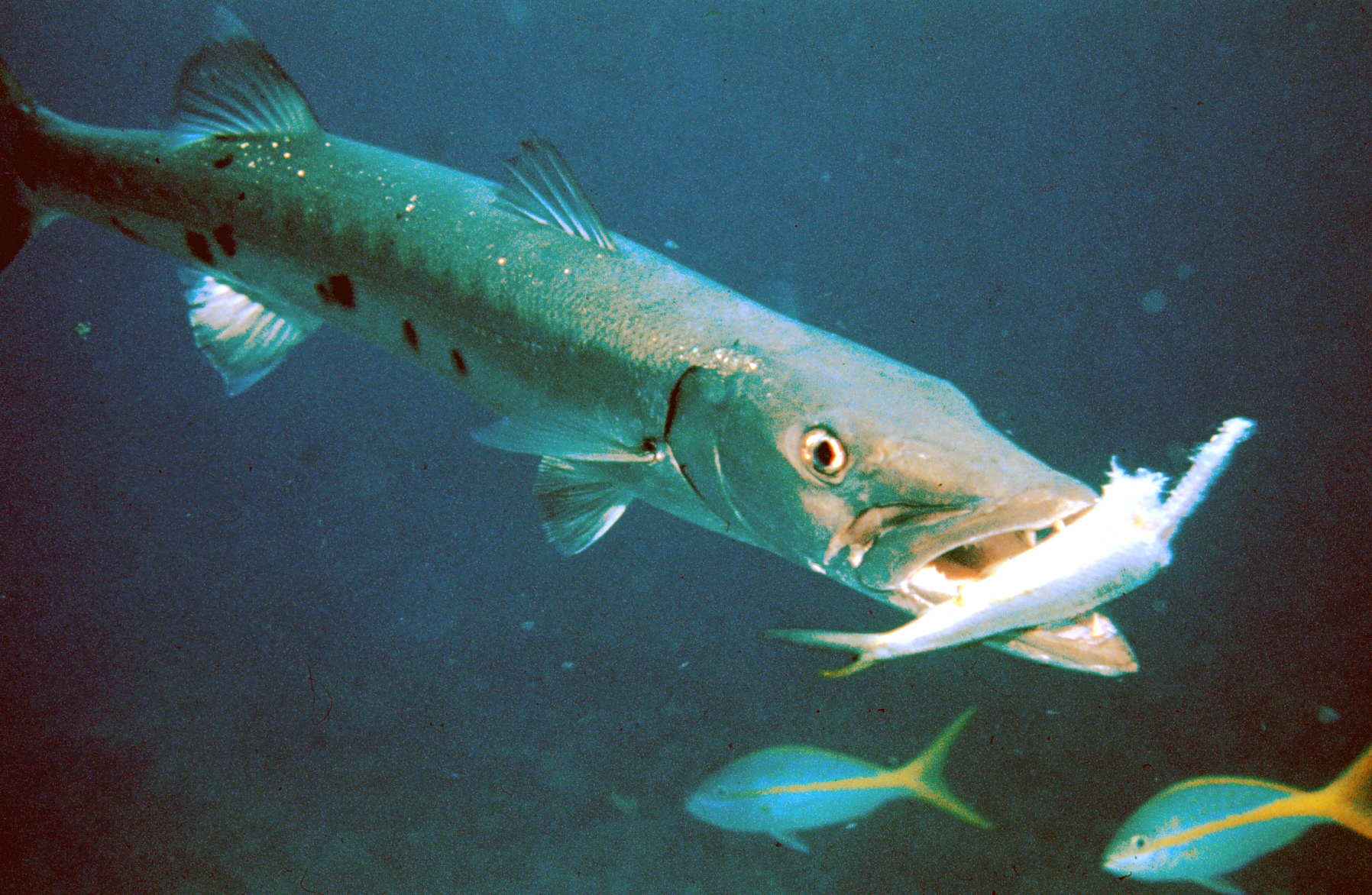
Great barracuda with prey

Barracudas are ferocious, opportunistic predators, relying on surprise and short bursts of speed, up to 27 mph (43 km/h), to overtake their prey.

Adults of most species are more or less solitary, while young and half-grown fish frequently congregate.

Barracudas prey primarily on fish (which may include some as large as themselves). Common prey fish include jacks, grunts, groupers, snappers, small tunas, mullets, killifishes, herrings, and anchovies; often by simply biting them in half. They kill and consume larger prey by tearing chunks out of their prey. They also seem to consume smaller species of sustenance that are in front of them. Barracuda species are often seen competing against mackerel, needle fish and sometimes even dolphins for prey.

Barracudas are usually found swimming in saltwater searching for schools of plankton-feeding fish. Their silver and elongated bodies make them difficult for prey to detect, especially when viewed head-on. Barracudas depend heavily on their eyesight when they are out hunting. When hunting, they tend to notice everything that has an unusual colour, reflection, or movement. Once a barracuda targets an intended prey item, its long tail and matching anal and dorsal fins enable it to move with swift bursts of speed to attack its prey before it can escape. Barracudas generally attack schools of fish, speeding at them head first and biting at them with their jaws. When barracudas age, they tend to swim alone. However, there are times when they tend to stay with the pack. Barracudas will sometimes swim in groups. In this case, they can relocate schools of fish into compact areas or lead them into shallow water to more easily feed on them.

=== Interactions with humans ===
Some species of barracuda are reputed to be dangerous to swimmers. Barracudas are scavengers, and may mistake snorkelers for large predators, following them hoping to eat the remains of their prey. Swimmers have reported being bitten by barracudas, but such incidents are rare and possibly caused by poor visibility. Large barracudas can be encountered in muddy shallows on rare occasion. Barracudas may mistake things that glint and shine, like jewelry, for prey. One incident reported a barracuda jumping out of water and injuring a kayaker, but Jason Schratwieser, conservation director of the International Game Fish Association, said that the wound could have been caused by a houndfish. Fatalities are nevertheless rare. Deaths have been reported in 1947 in Florida, 1957 in North Carolina and 1960 in Florida, again.

== As food ==
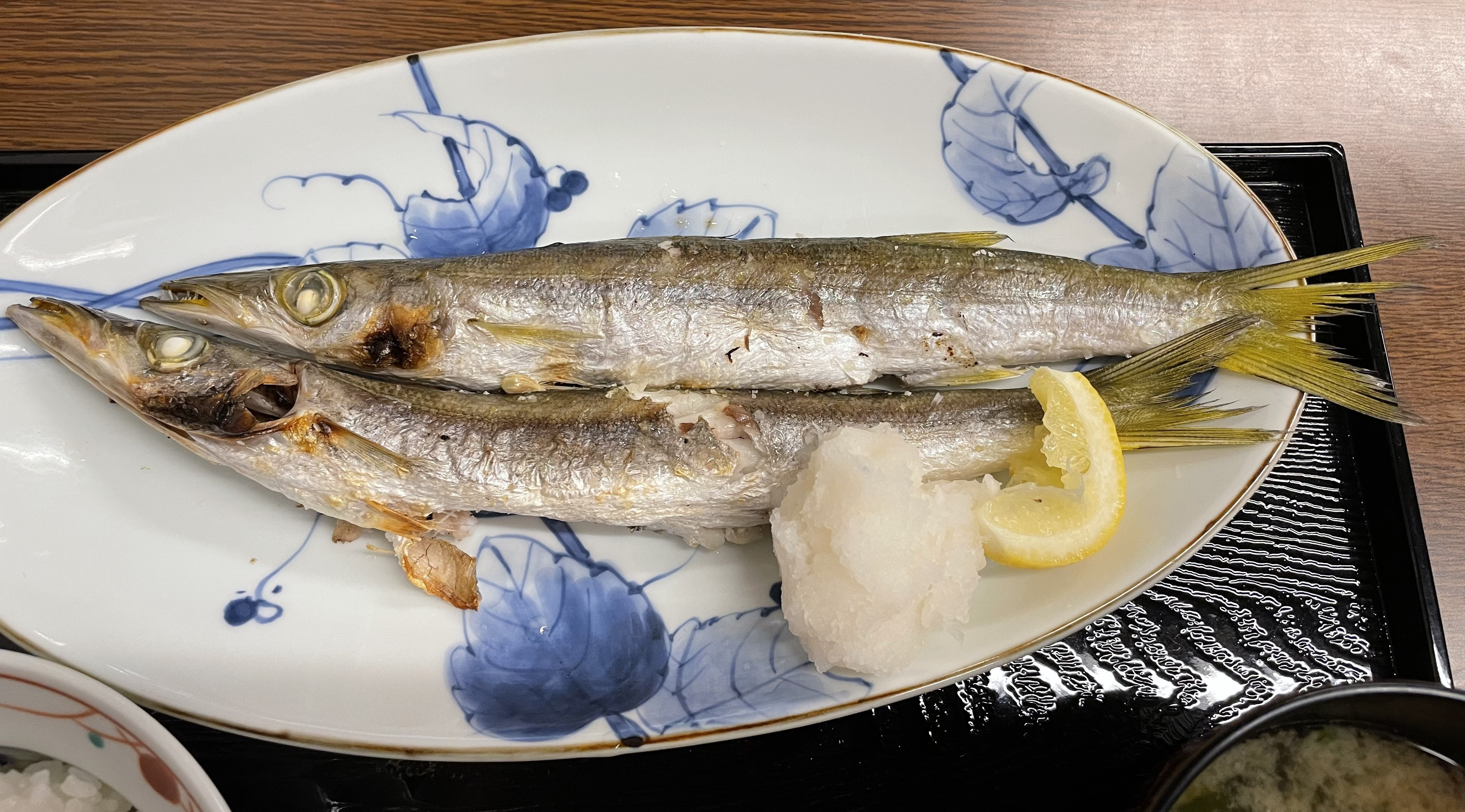
Grilled red barracuda in Japan

Barracudas are popular both as food and game fish. They are most often eaten as fillets or steaks. Larger species, such as the great barracuda, have been implicated in cases of ciguatera fish poisoning. Those who have been diagnosed with this type of food poisoning display symptoms of gastrointestinal discomfort, limb weakness, and an inability to differentiate hot from cold effectively.

West Africans smoke them for use in soups and sauces. Smoking protects the soft flesh from disintegrating in the broth and gives it a smoky flavour.

In Thai cuisine, barracuda meat is often used in curry sauce for khanom chin (Thai fermented rice noodles) or steamed in banana-leaf parcels as hor mok. In Chinese cuisine, it is commonly prepared by steaming.

== Gallery ==
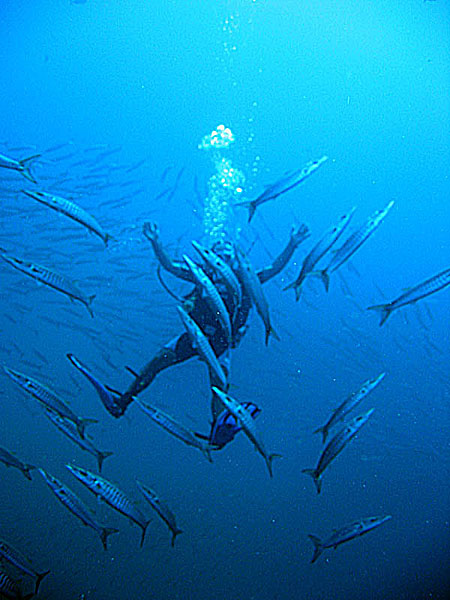
Scuba diver swimming inside a battery of Sphyraena putnamae off Ko Tao, Thailand

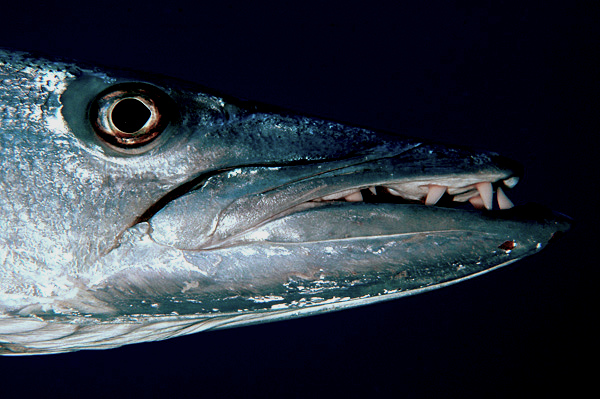
Close-up of Sphyraena barracuda

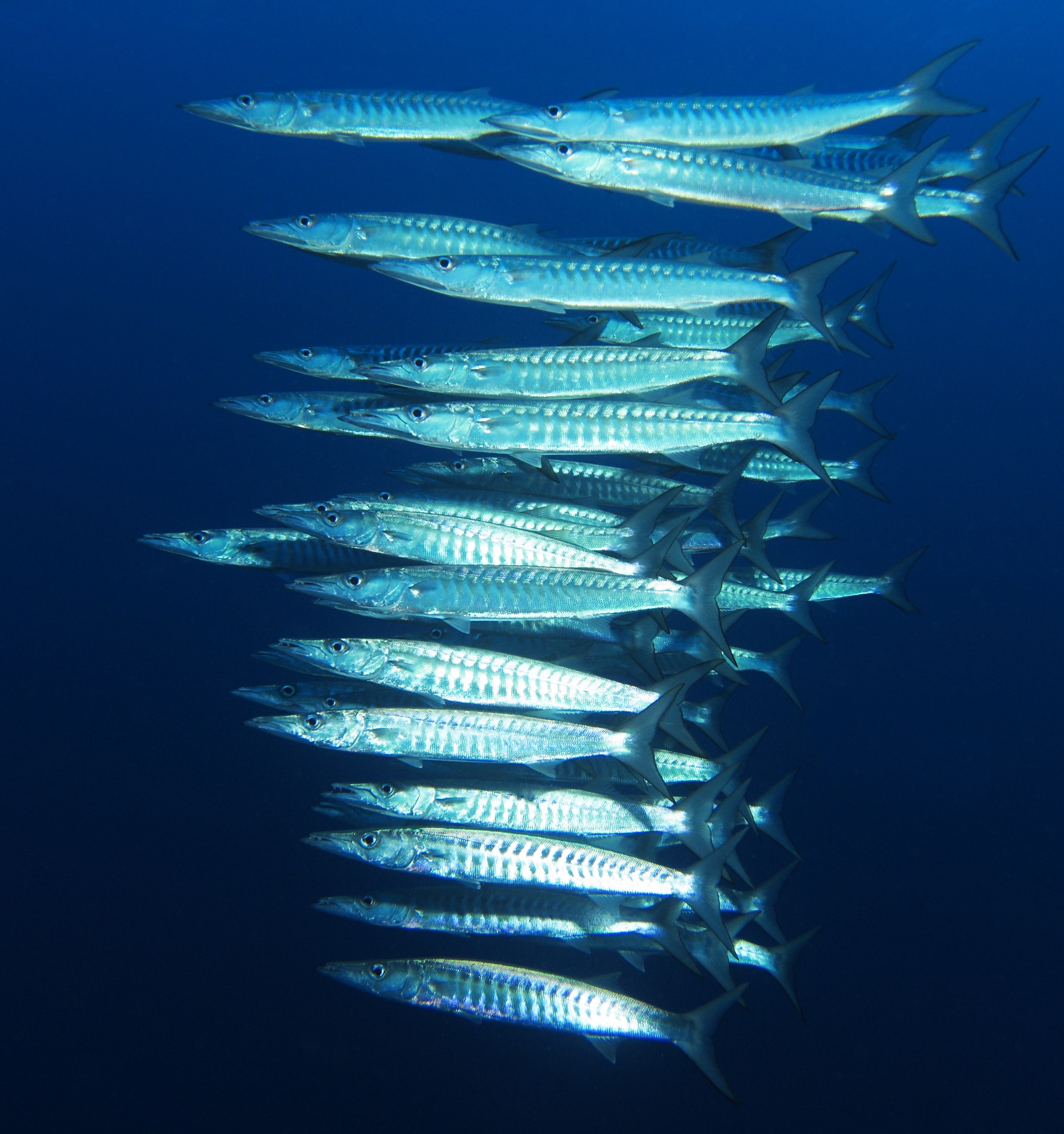
Battery of Sphyraena qenie at Elphinstone Reef in the Red Sea

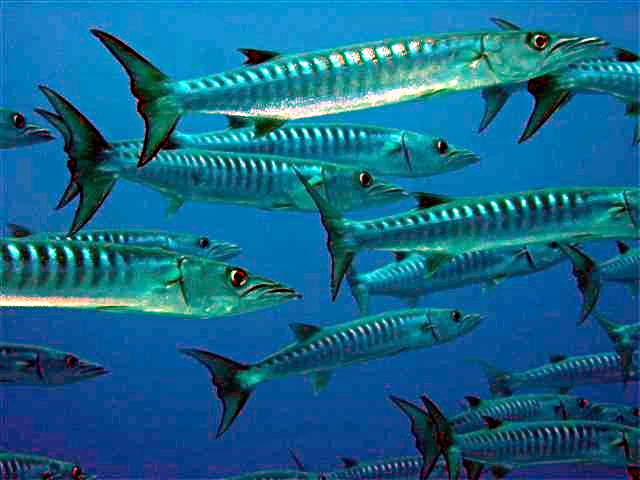
A battery of Sphyraena putnamae in Bora Bora

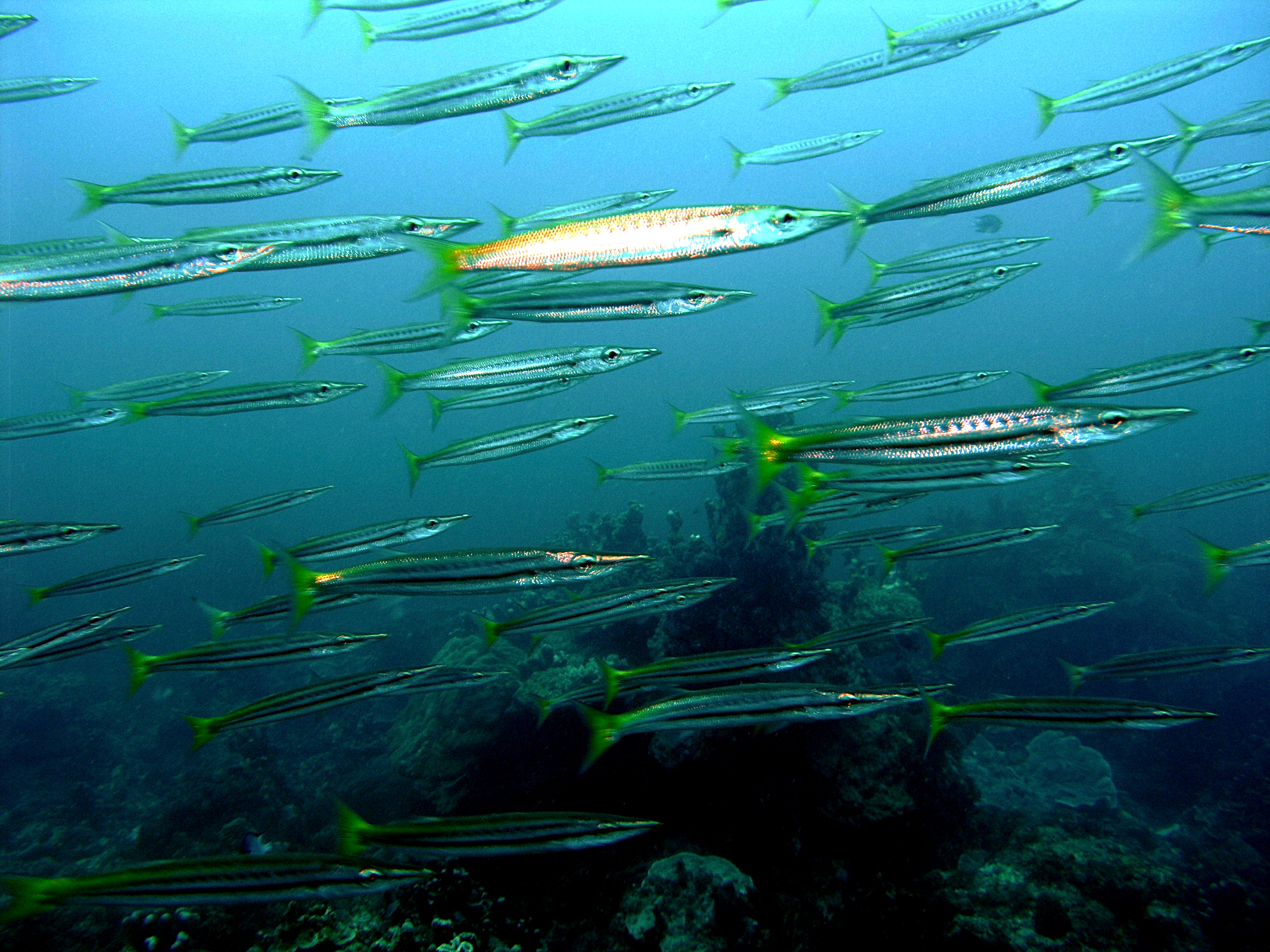
A battery of Sphyraena flavicauda off Dayang, Malaysia

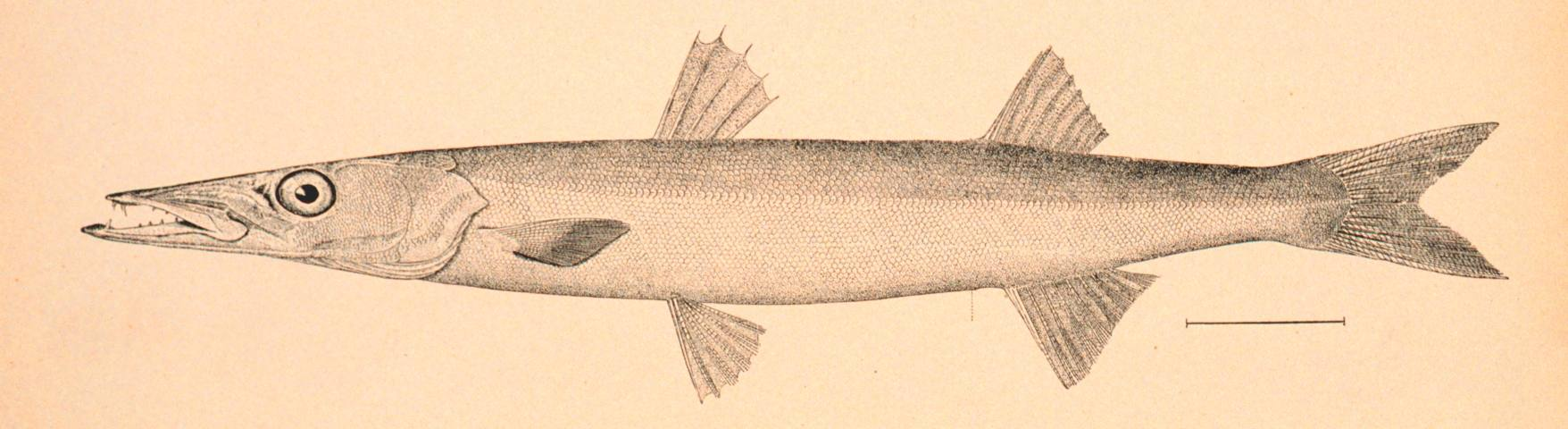
Sphyraena borealis

Woman carrying a barracuda in Madagascar

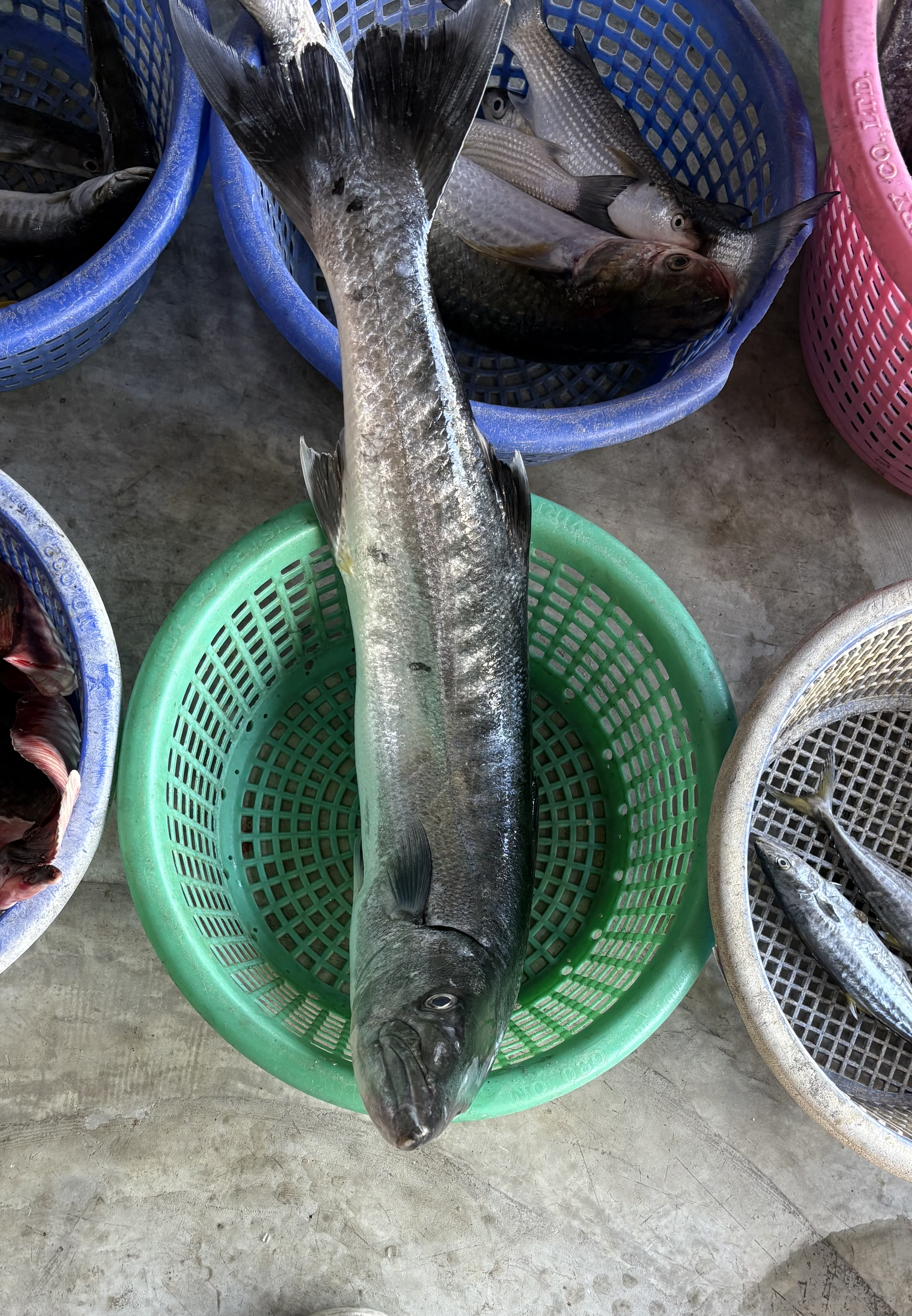
Great Barracuda (Sphyraena barracuda)
