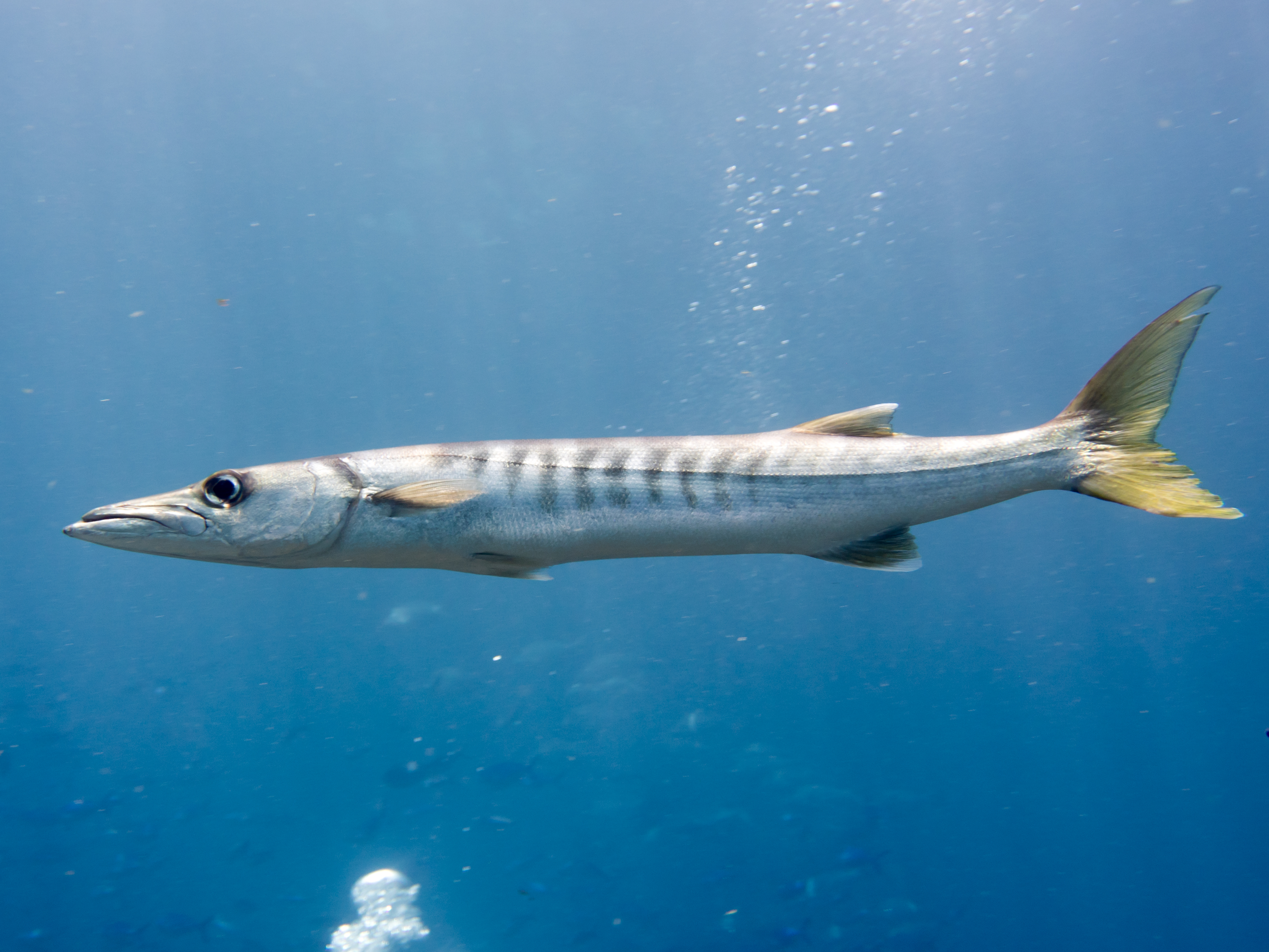

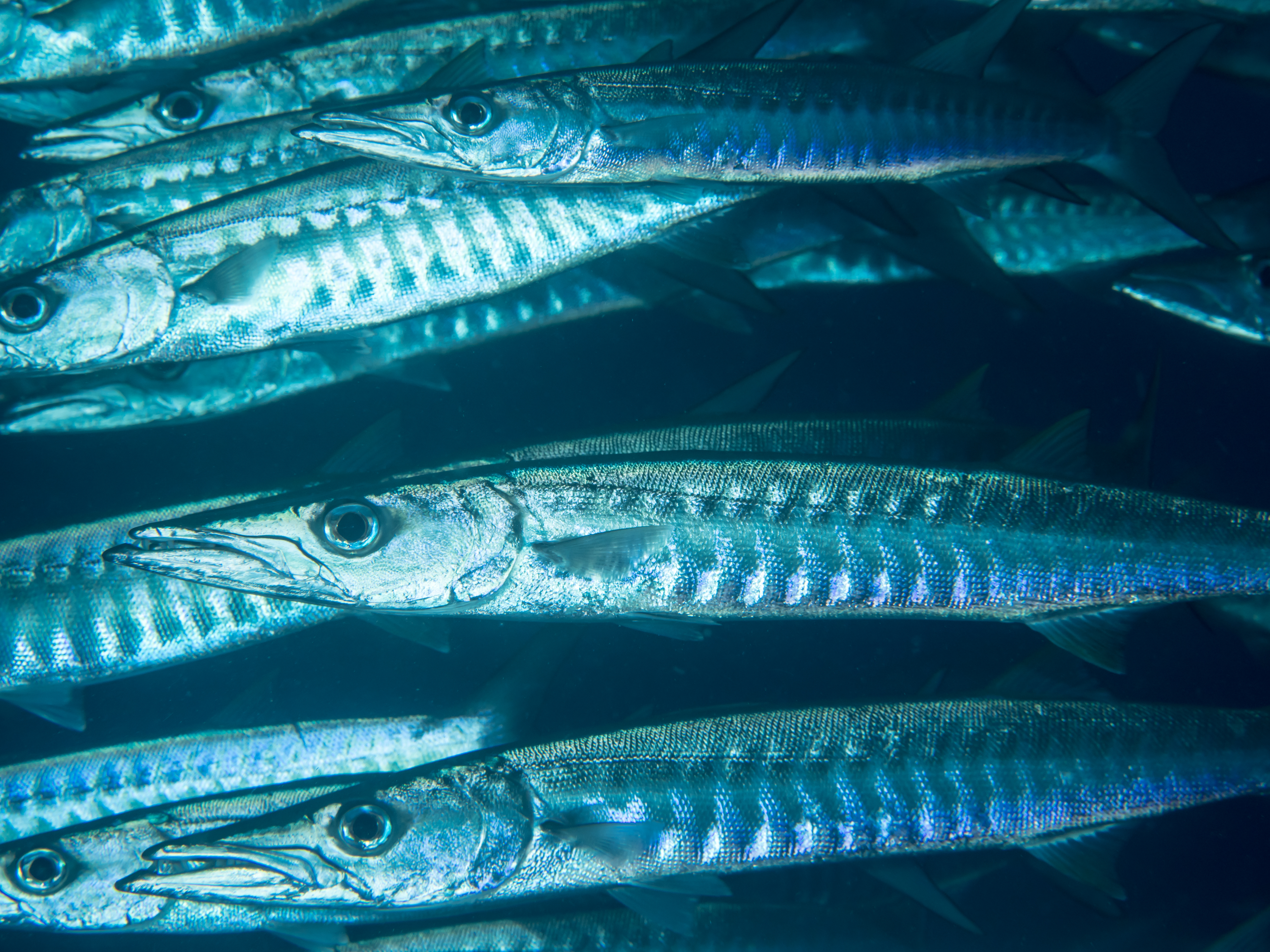

Scientific classification
- Kingdom: Animalia
- Phylum: Chordata
- Class: Actinopterygii
- Order: Carangiformes
- Suborder: Centropomoidei
- Family: Sphyraenidae
- Genus: Sphyraena
- Species: S. jello

Binomial name
- Sphyraena jello Cuvier in Cuvier and Valenciennes, 1829

= Pickhandle barracuda =

Species of ray-finned fish

The pickhandle barracuda (Sphyraena jello) is a species of barracuda found throughout the Indo-Pacific region. Its common name derives from the dark marks along its sides, which look like the thick ends of pickaxe handles. Sea anglers sometimes colloquially shorten the name to "pick". Other common names for the species include banded barracuda, yellowtail barracuda, and sea pike.

== Morphology and biology ==
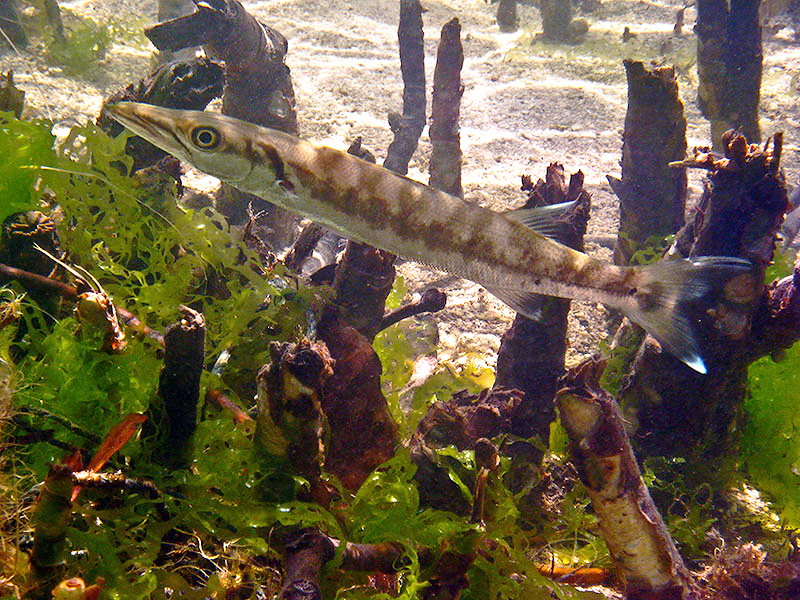
Juvenile

The silver body of the pickhandle barracuda is outlined with approximately 20 wavy bars along the body of the fish, along with the dark marks. These dark markings fade under preservation. The tail fin is yellow in colour. Like many other barracuda, the jaws have an underbite.

It has been shown that Sphyraena jello feeds after releasing its gonads to spawn. This release creates space for the stomach to magnify its capacity for appropriate feeding. S. jello spawns in the Persian Gulf in October and November.

== Distribution and habitat ==
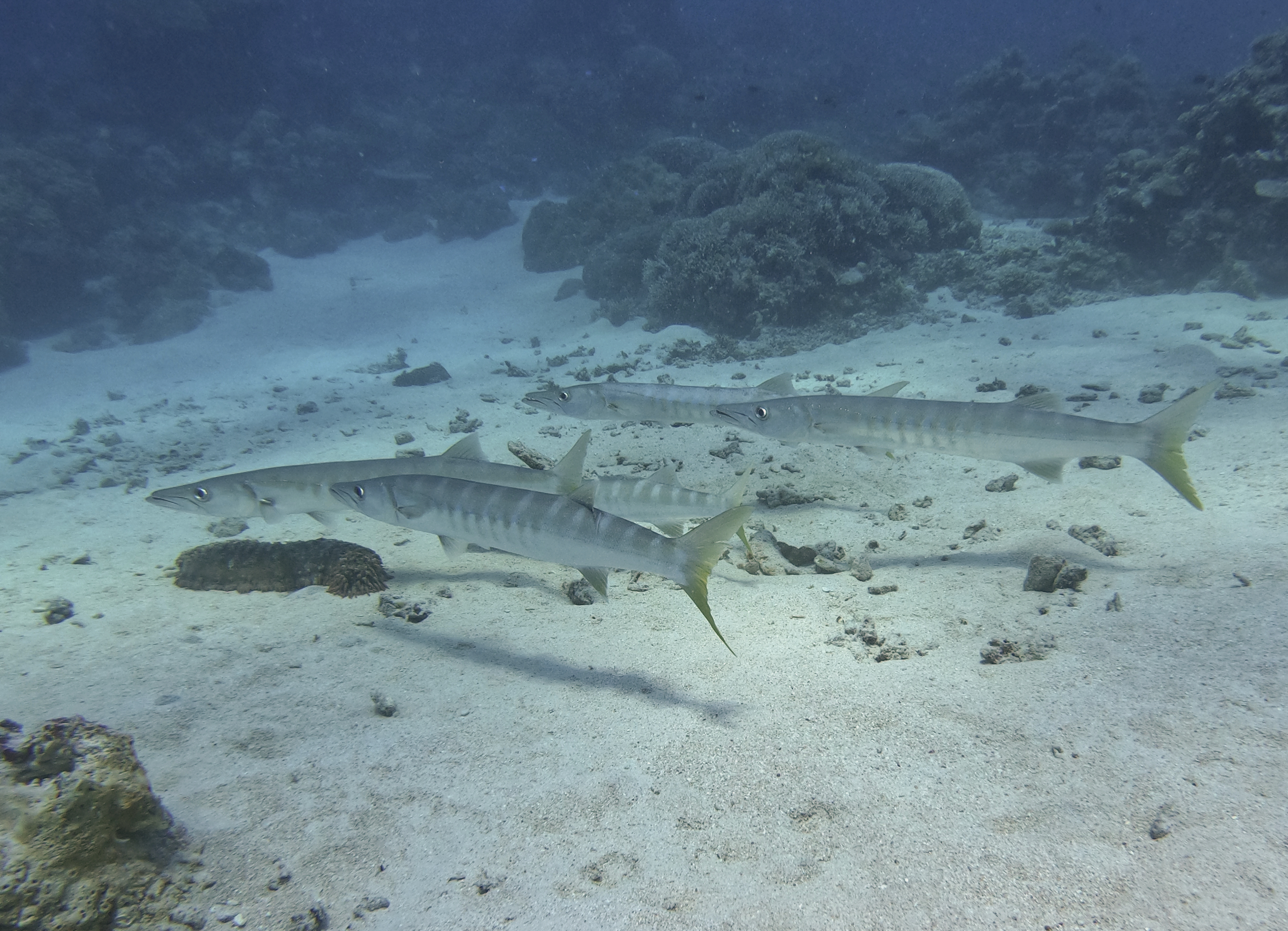
Queensland

The pickhandle barracuda can be found in many locations throughout the Pacific Ocean. They can usually be found in schools swimming in the tropical waters of the Pacific Ocean, particularly around coral reefs. However, during the night the pickhandle barracuda begin to hunt. These fish can be found at many depths ranging from 2–200 meters.
