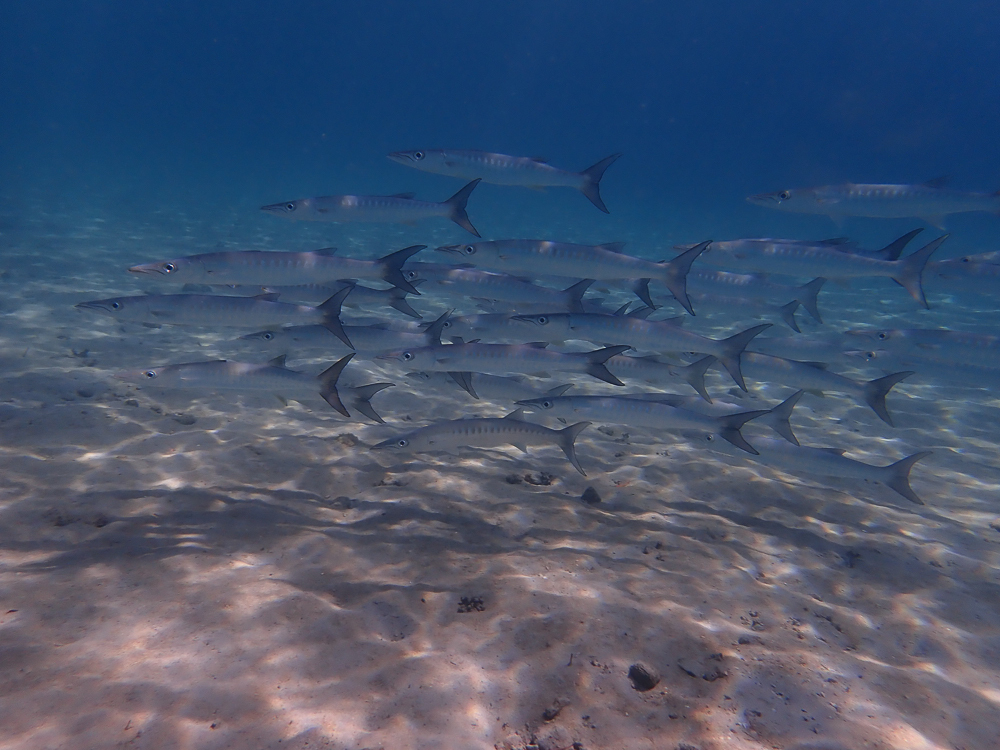

Conservation status
- Least Concern (IUCN 3.1)

Scientific classification
- Kingdom: Animalia
- Phylum: Chordata
- Class: Actinopterygii
- Order: Carangiformes
- Suborder: Centropomoidei
- Family: Sphyraenidae
- Genus: Sphyraena
- Species: S. ensis

Binomial name
- Sphyraena ensis Jordan and Gilbert, 1882

= Mexican barracuda =

Species of ray-finned fish

Sphyraena ensis, commonly known as the Mexican barracuda or simply barracuda, is a species of barracuda that inhabits the continental shelf of the Eastern Pacific from southern California to northern Chile. They have a long cylindrical body and are silvery in color, with a protruding lower jaw containing many sharp teeth of unequal size. Often found in schools, they can be found from coastal habitats such as estuaries and mangroves out into deeper water. Due to their abundance they are an important food fish for the region.
