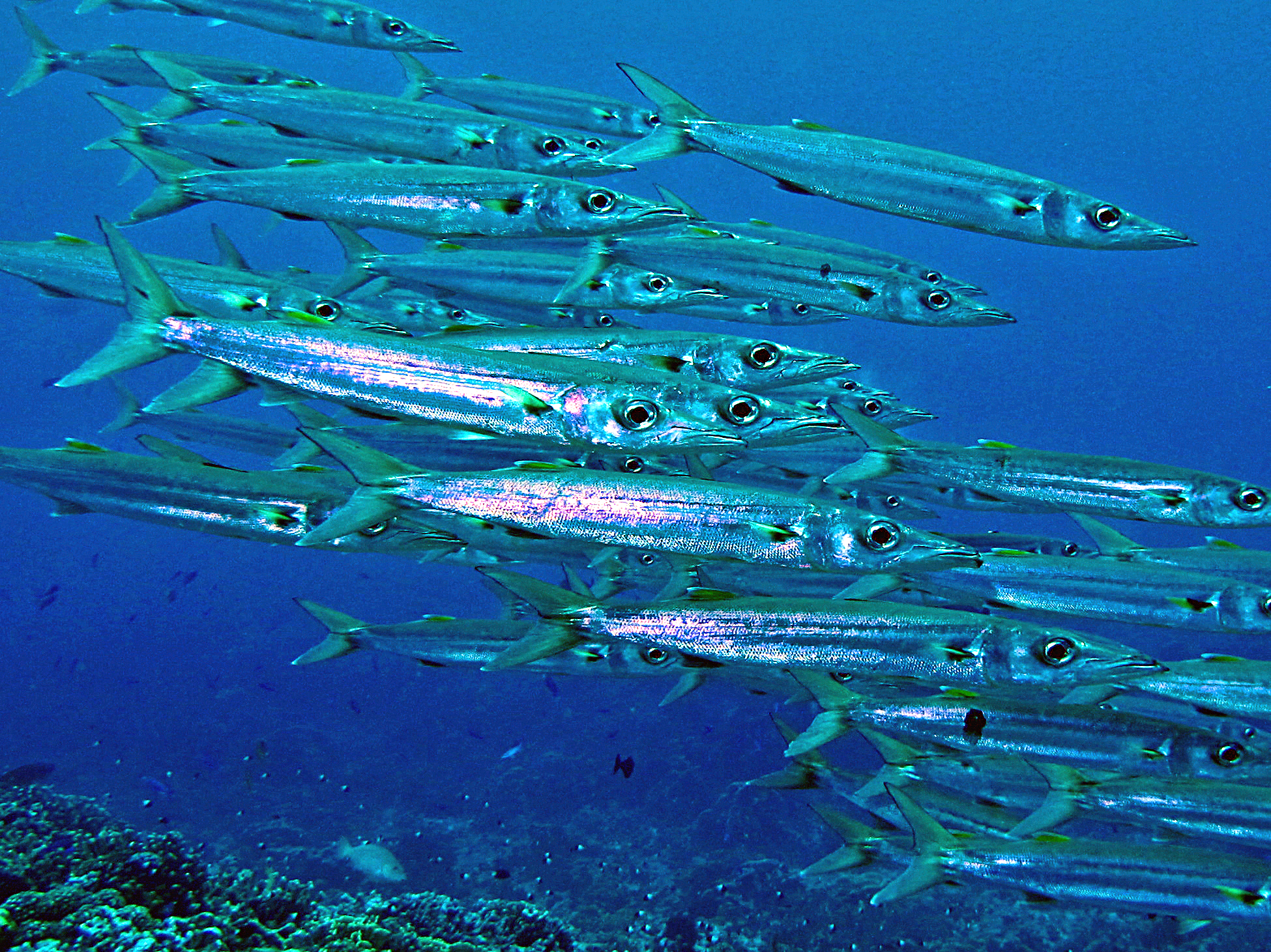
- Sphyraena helleri from French Polynesia

Scientific classification
- Kingdom: Animalia
- Phylum: Chordata
- Class: Actinopterygii
- Order: Carangiformes
- Suborder: Centropomoidei
- Family: Sphyraenidae
- Genus: Sphyraena
- Species: S. helleri

Binomial name
- Sphyraena helleri Jenkins, 1901

= Sphyraena helleri =

Species of ray-finned fish

Sphyraena helleri, the Heller's barracuda, is a schooling species of barracuda in the family Sphyraenidae.

The species is named in honor of zoologist Edmund Heller

== Description ==
Sphyraena helleri can reach a length of 40–80 centimetres (16–31 in). The skinny bodies are silvery with a horizontal blue stripe and two yellowish stripes on the sides. These fishes have six dorsal spines and two anal spines. The caudal fin is darkish. They are usually seen by day in large schools, while they hunt nocturnally. Unlike some other reef fish that have trichromatic vision which is when you can see three colors red, green, and blue together to make lots of different colors. S. helleri is dichromatic meaning it has two types of color receptors in its eyes. This change likely affects how it sees its surroundings and communicates through body coloration

== Distribution and habitat ==
This species is present in the Indian Ocean (East Africa and the Mascarene Islands) and in the Pacific Ocean (north to southern Japan, south to the Coral Sea, and east to French Polynesia; Hawaiian Islands). These fishes inhabit coral reefs and bays.
