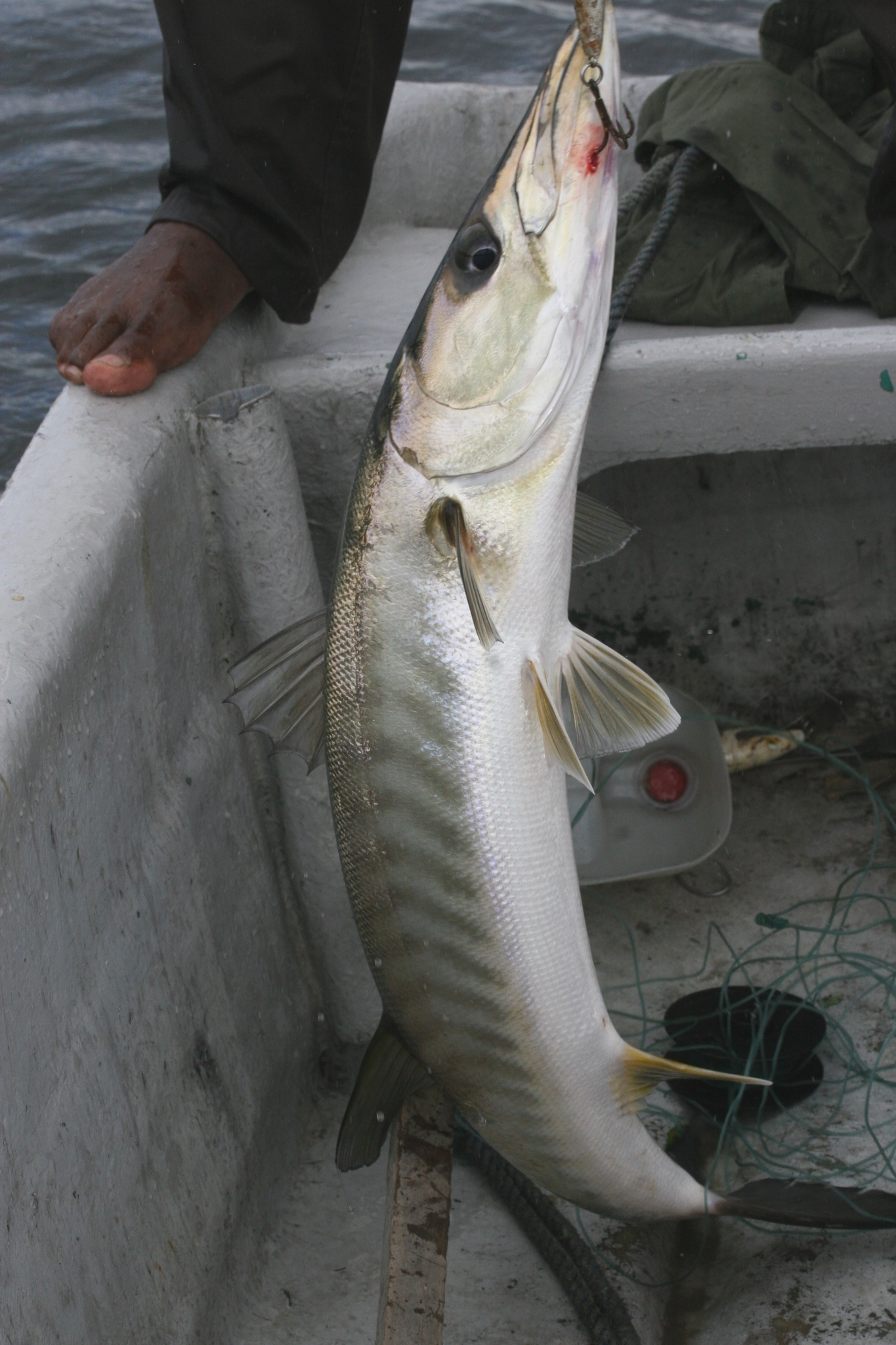

Conservation status
- Least Concern (IUCN 3.1)

Scientific classification
- Kingdom: Animalia
- Phylum: Chordata
- Class: Actinopterygii
- Division: Teleostei
- Order: Carangiformes
- Suborder: Centropomoidei
- Family: Sphyraenidae
- Genus: Sphyraena
- Species: S. afra

Binomial name
- Sphyraena afra Peters, 1844

= Sphyraena afra =

Guinean barracuda

Species of barracuda

Sphyraena afra, commonly known as the Guinean barracuda, is a species of barracuda found off the western coast of Africa from Senegal to Namibia. They are not particularly common throughout their range. They are carnivorous, feeding on fish and shrimp. They are found on the continental shelf and are known to occur from lagoons and estuaries out to a depth of 75 m (250 ft).

== Interactions with humans ==
Although a common food fish, the Guinean barracuda is not the target of any large fishing industry itself. They are usually caught using low-tech fishing gear such as handlines or nets by artisanal fisheries, with Nigeria's fisheries catching the majority of these fish every year. A 2018 paper found that the numbers caught in Nigeria each year exceed sustainable levels, and that the fish is over-exploited, leading to population decline.
