= Sennet =

Sennet may refer to:

- USS Sennet (SS-408)
- Sennet, the predecessor of the London Student
- Northern sennet and Southern sennet, two species of barracuda

== See also ==
- Cynet (disambiguation)
- Senet
- Senate
