= Obtuse =

Obtuse may refer to:

- Obtuse angle, an angle of between 90 and 180 degrees
- Obtuse triangle, a triangle with an internal angle of between 90 and 180 degrees
- Obtuse leaf shape
- Obtuse tepal shape
- Obtuse barracuda, a ray-finned fish
- Obtuse, a neighborhood in Brookfield, Connecticut
