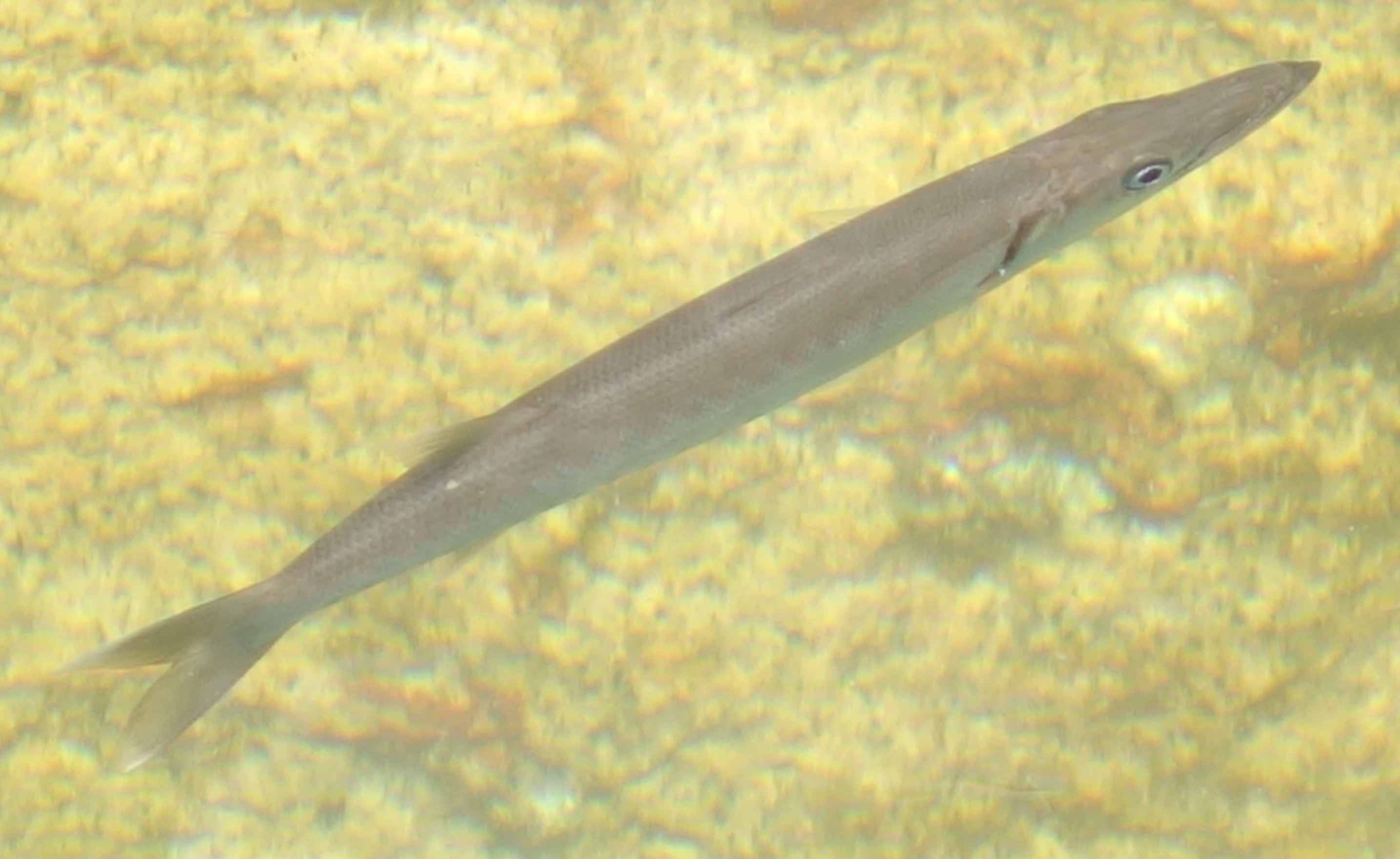

Scientific classification
- Kingdom: Animalia
- Phylum: Chordata
- Class: Actinopterygii
- Order: Carangiformes
- Suborder: Centropomoidei
- Family: Sphyraenidae
- Genus: Sphyraena
- Species: S. acutipinnis

Binomial name
- Sphyraena acutipinnis Day, 1876

= Sharpfin barracuda =

Species of ray-finned fish

The sharpfin barracuda (Sphyraena acutipinnis) is a schooling species of barracuda that inhabits lagoons, bays and seaward reefs. It is nocturnally active. It grows to 80 cm (31 in) total length, although it is commonly somewhat smaller. The species is found across the Indo-Pacific from East Africa to the Hawaiian, Marquesan and Tuamoto islands, north to southern Japan.
