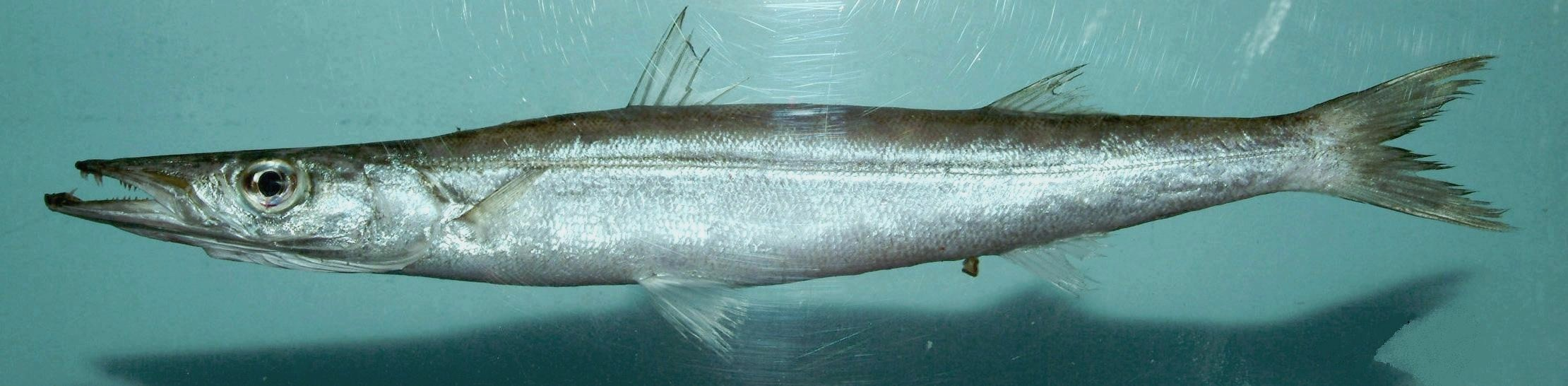

Conservation status
- Least Concern (IUCN 3.1)

Scientific classification
- Kingdom: Animalia
- Phylum: Chordata
- Class: Actinopterygii
- Order: Carangiformes
- Suborder: Centropomoidei
- Family: Sphyraenidae
- Genus: Sphyraena
- Species: S. guachancho

Binomial name
- Sphyraena guachancho Cuvier, 1829

Synonyms
- Sphyraena dubia (Bleeker, 1863); Sphyraena guentheri (Haly, 1875)

= Guachanche barracuda =

Species of fish

The Guachanche barracuda (Sphyraena guachancho) is an ocean-going species of game fish in the barracuda family, Sphyraenidae. It was described by the French zoologist Georges Cuvier in 1829. The description was part of the second edition of Le Règne Animal, or The Animal Kingdom. Guachanche barracuda are also known simply as guaguanche throughout much of the Caribbean. When used for food, Guaguanche barracuda are usually sold fresh or salted.

== Description ==
Guachanche barracuda, like other members of the family Sphyraenidae, possess elongated bodies, pike-like heads, and large jaws. The lower jaw protrudes slightly from the upper jaw, both of which contain fang-like teeth. They have two dorsal fins, which are widely separated on their backs. The anterior dorsal fin usually possesses spines, while the posterior only has rays. Guachanche barracuda have six dorsal spines and 9 rays on their dorsal fins, while they have only two spines and eight rays on their anal fins.

Guachanche barracuda can grow up to 200 cm in length, but have only been recorded to weigh as much as 1.75 kg.

== Distribution and habitat ==
In the western Atlantic Ocean, Guachanche barracuda are known from Massachusetts to Brazil. They are also found in the northern Gulf of Mexico and throughout the Caribbean. In the eastern Atlantic, although Guachanche barracuda are known from Senegal to Angola (including Cape Verde), they can also be found off the Canary Islands, which lie much further north.

Guachanche barracuda can live in turbid, coastal waters at depths up to 100 m. They generally occur near muddy bottoms and are often found in estuaries. A schooling species, Guachanche barracuda feed on several fishes from the Engraulidae, Clupeidae, Lutjanidae and Synodontidae families. They have also been known to feed on squid of the Loliginidae family.
