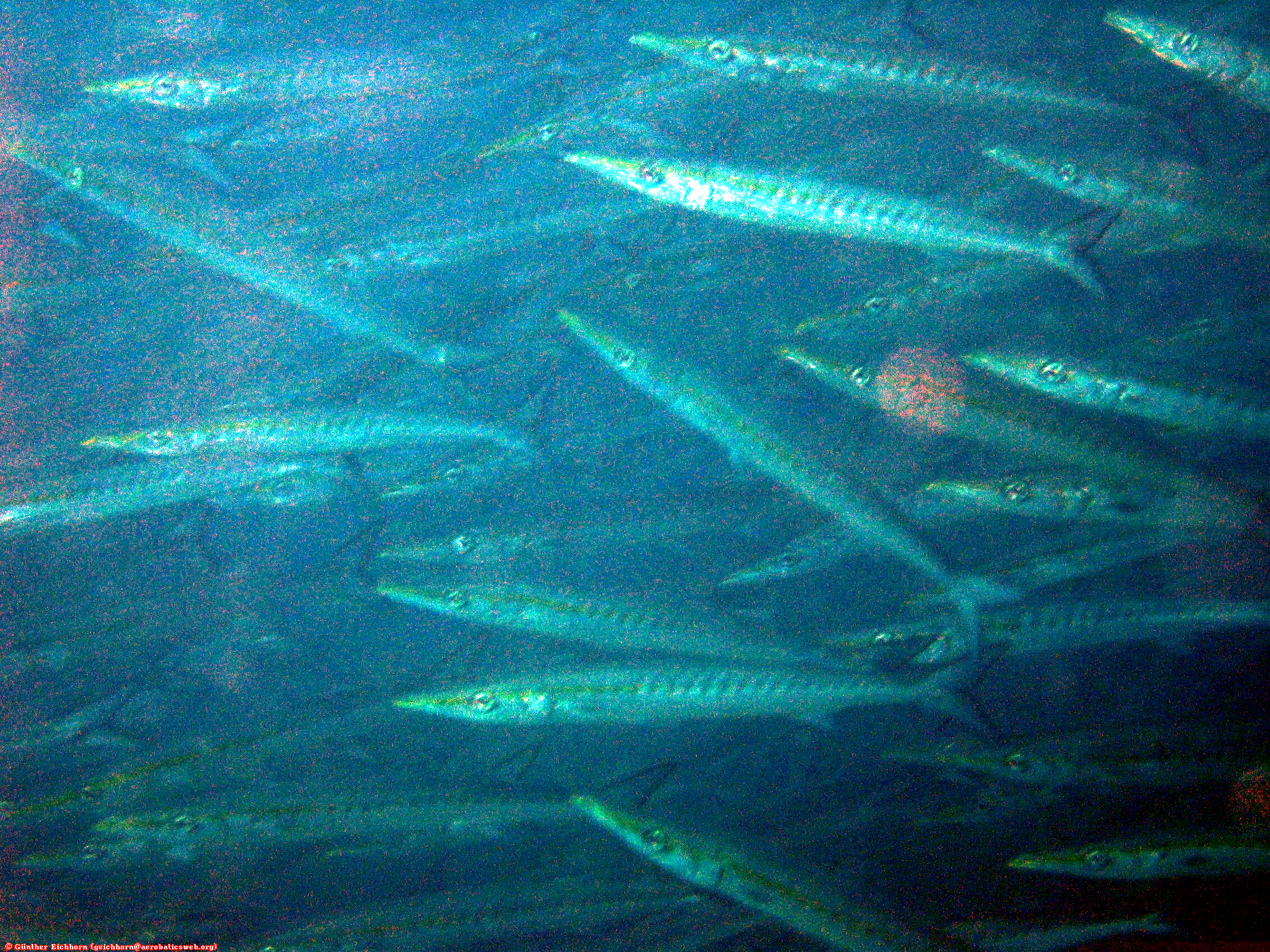
- In the Galapagos Islands

Conservation status
- Least Concern (IUCN 3.1)

Scientific classification
- Domain: Eukaryota
- Kingdom: Animalia
- Phylum: Chordata
- Class: Actinopterygii
- Order: Carangiformes
- Suborder: Centropomoidei
- Family: Sphyraenidae
- Genus: Sphyraena
- Species: S. idiastes

Binomial name
- Sphyraena idiastes Heller & Snodgrass, 1903

= Pelican barracuda =

Species of ray-finned fish

The pelican barracuda (Sphyraena idiastes) is a predatory ray-finned fish found in temperate coastal and oceanic waters. They are usually seen in groups of 3-20, from the surface to about 24 m. Pelican barracuda feed mainly on fish . Large individuals may slash prey into pieces before swallowing them.

== Distribution ==
From the tip of Baja California and near Guaymas, in the eastern Gulf of California south to Colombia to Chile, as well as the Galapagos Islands, Cocos Island, and Malpelo Island.
