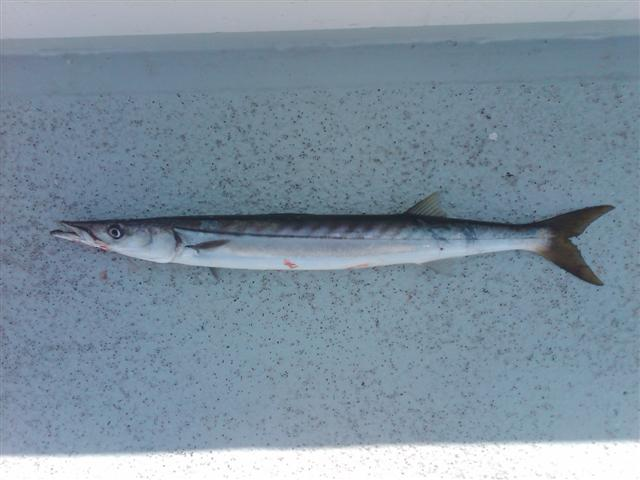

Conservation status
- Least Concern (IUCN 3.1)

Scientific classification
- Kingdom: Animalia
- Phylum: Chordata
- Class: Actinopterygii
- Order: Carangiformes
- Suborder: Centropomoidei
- Family: Sphyraenidae
- Genus: Sphyraena
- Species: S. argentea

Binomial name
- Sphyraena argentea Girard, 1854

= Pacific barracuda =

Species of fish

Sphyraena argentea (also known as the Pacific barracuda, California barracuda or the silver barracuda) is a predatory species of marine barracuda fish of the family Sphyraenidae. They are found in the northeast Pacific Ocean, from Cabo San Lucas, Baja California Sur north to Washington State. However, they are not common north of Point Conception in Santa Barbara County, California, usually preferring warmer waters. They can reach a length of about 1.2 metres (3.9 ft) and a weight of about 6.8 kilograms (15 lb). This species of barracuda is a very popular sport fish in Southern California.

== Body type and physical description ==
The Pacific barracuda has an elongated, cylindrical body, very slender and with a long, pointy snout. The scales are of a pale bluish to pale brown color on their front sides. They are distinct from other barracuda due to their silvery, shiny backsides, small scales, and the lack of bars or spots on their body. Like other barracudas, though, they are famous for their intimidating-looking mouths full of sharp teeth and fang-like structures; the Pacific barracuda is a predatory fish with aggressive hunting characteristics. The protruding lower jaw of the barracuda helps in its carnivorous feeding habits, aiding in catching slippery fish. The average weight of the Pacific barracuda is about 1–3 kg; their total length is about 1-1.1 m, rarely exceeding 1.2 m. Pacific barracuda have a distinctly forked tail-fin and widely-separated dorsal fins.

== Habitat and distribution ==
The Pacific barracuda is found in the Northeast Pacific Ocean, typically offshore of the U.S. West Coast. While it is usually considered a pelagic species, and can could be found as far north as southern Alaska, they are most frequently found along the coast of California extending down to the southern tip of Baja California Sur, Guadalupe Island and near the mouth of the Gulf of California. During the winter, the Pacific barracuda migrate in shoals south from the American west coast to Baja California, but generally not further south, though they have been sighted as far south as Panamá's Pacific coast. The Pacific barracuda's natural habitat is in offshore marine waters, typically gravitating closer to shore or coastal areas in adult life; however, when young, Pacific barracuda are sometimes found somewhat further inland in bays or lagoons, and in brackish, shallow waters. Deeper-swimming barracuda have been documented at depths of about 37 m (121'). Barracuda are known to form schools and move across the ocean in these groups.

== Feeding and behavior ==
The Pacific barracuda are a predatory fish, exhibiting aggressive behavior in order to feed on other small fishes. Their diet primarily consists of small fish such as anchovies, small pacific mackerels, grunions, squid, groupers, grunts, and even young barracuda. Their tight schools allow them to herd their prey in shallow waters circled by Barracuda, thus feeding a greater amount of fish. The Barracuda uses its sharp eyesight to find prey, following light or sudden movements in the water that may direct the fish to prey. Their jaw and teeth structure allow them to be fierce predators to their prey. Their jaws also allow them to pump water across their gills. Although considered aggressive predators to smaller fish, the Pacific barracuda are typically harmless to the rest of the surrounding ocean, unlike the Great Barracuda. Their behavior only appears to be violent, however, the Pacific barracuda will swim away when approached and return to their schools.

== Maturity and reproduction ==
Most Pacific barracuda are mature by 2 years old. Females at that age may produce approximately 50,000 eggs while older female Pacific barracuda can produce from 200,000 to 400,000 eggs. The Barracuda, like most other fish, exhibit external fertilization and lay their eggs in intervals. The parents are not known to care for their young. They are pelagic spawners. In addition, the Pacific barracuda are open water egg scatterers, meaning they do not guard their eggs and leave eggs after spawning in a water column in the open water. Until this date, Pacific barracuda are known to live to about 12 years. A documented distinction between males and females of this species is that females have a charcoal or black edge on their pelvic fins while the males will have a yellow or olive-colored edge on the corresponding fins.

== Conservation ==
Pacific barracuda are considered a huge sporting fish in California. In the early 1900s, the purse seine fishery heavily targeted the Pacific barracuda. Their population continually decreased until the 1940s when the state of California put size and technique restrictions on the commercial and recreational fishing of the Pacific barracuda. These restrictions caused commercial fisheries to start using gill nets instead of purse seines. Furthermore, Barracuda are not a common seafood item. Since these restrictions were put, the population size has increased to near record levels. Nowadays, although fishing the species is still popular, the population size is overall stable. The stability of their population size is also somewhat attributed to their substantial egg production. They are not on the IUCN Red List of threatened or vulnerable species. The restrictions continue to protect the species. However, due to their migration, some of their range of population may be threatened. Predators of the Pacific barracuda include eagles and terns. The Pacific barracuda is not typically favored as a food fish in the US due to its association with its Atlantic and Caribbean relative, the Great Barracuda, which is strongly linked to ciguatera poisoning. However, the Pacific barracuda is considered safe to eat. Quick bleeding is recommended to preserve the freshness of the meat to prevent spoiling. Even though the cases have been rare and are not substantial, there are ways the Pacific barracuda can cause ciguatera poisoning. This is when the fish feed on reef fish that have fed on algae or smaller fish that in turn have fed on toxin containing micro-alga.
