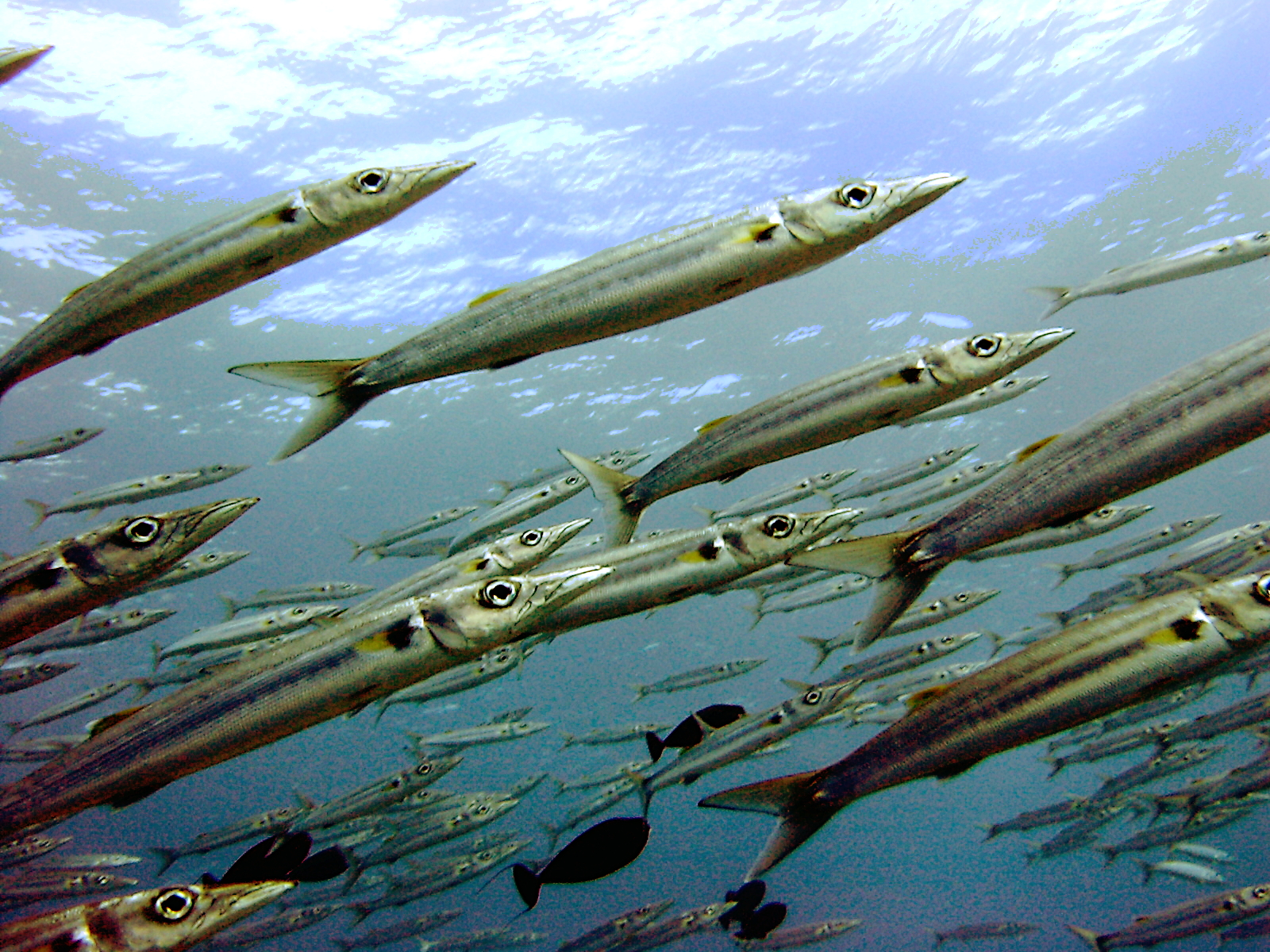

Scientific classification
- Kingdom: Animalia
- Phylum: Chordata
- Class: Actinopterygii
- Order: Carangiformes
- Suborder: Centropomoidei
- Family: Sphyraenidae
- Genus: Sphyraena
- Species: S. forsteri

Binomial name
- Sphyraena forsteri Cuvier, 1829

Synonyms
- Sphyraena toxeuma (Fowler, 1904); Callosphyraena toxeuma (Fowler, 1904)

= Bigeye barracuda =

Species of ray-finned fish

The bigeye barracuda (Sphyraena forsteri) is a species of the family Sphyraenidae, which can be found in the tropical Indo-West Pacific oceans, excluding Hawaii.

== Description ==
The bigeye barracuda can grow up to 2.25 feet (0.69 m). It is silver in color and long skinny shape from head to tail. They are nocturnal and like to eat crustaceans, fish, and squid.

== Habitat ==
Bigeye barracuda are found in large schools in lagoon-like areas as well as the outer reef slopes from as little as 5 feet to 900 feet of depth.
