= Sphyraena tome =

Scientific classification
- Kingdom: Animalia
- Phylum: Chordata
- Class: Actinopterygii
- Order: Carangiformes
- Suborder: Centropomoidei
- Family: Sphyraenidae
- Genus: Sphyraena
- Species: S. tome

Binomial name
- Sphyraena tome Fowler, 1903

Species of fish

Sphyraena tome is a species of barracuda that is endemic to the Southwest Atlantic. It lives in pelagic-neritic marine environments about 19–83 m (62–272 ft) below the water surface. The species usually grow to 38 cm (15 in), though they can grow to 45 cm (18 in).
