= Sphyraena lucasana =

Conservation status
- Data Deficient (IUCN 3.1)

Scientific classification
- Kingdom: Animalia
- Phylum: Chordata
- Class: Actinopterygii
- Order: Carangiformes
- Suborder: Centropomoidei
- Family: Sphyraenidae
- Genus: Sphyraena
- Species: S. lucasana

Binomial name
- Sphyraena lucasana Gill, 1863

Species of ray-finned fish

Sphyraena lucasana is a species of barracuda found in the waters around southern Baja California and in the Gulf of California. Also known as the Lucas barracuda and the Cortez barracuda, this species can reach up to 76 cm (30 in) in length. They are pelagic fish that hunt in open water and they themselves are often food for local fishing communities. This species also has a distinct protruding lower jaw that does not reach under the eye. Their color is silvery with around 20 on the upper side of the body with pale fins.
