= Sphyraena iburiensis =

Scientific classification
- Kingdom: Animalia
- Phylum: Chordata
- Class: Actinopterygii
- Order: Carangiformes
- Suborder: Centropomoidei
- Family: Sphyraenidae
- Genus: Sphyraena
- Species: S. iburiensis

Binomial name
- Sphyraena iburiensis Doiuchi & Nakabo, 2005

Species of ray-finned fish

Sphyraena iburiensis is a relatively recently discovered species of barracuda in the genus Sphyraena only being formally described in 2005. Found in the Eastern Pacific most commonly between southern Japan and Taiwan. They can be differentiated from other species of barracuda by the number and lay out of their scales and the presence of two distinctive longitudinal stripes. The lower of the two stripes are especially distinct stretching from the snout to the base of the caudal fin just below the lateral line. The species is also known for having a completely transparent membrane on the first dorsal fin.
