= Sphyraena waitii =

Scientific classification
- Domain: Eukaryota
- Kingdom: Animalia
- Phylum: Chordata
- Class: Actinopterygii
- Order: Carangiformes
- Suborder: Centropomoidei
- Family: Sphyraenidae
- Genus: Sphyraena
- Species: S. waitii

Binomial name
- Sphyraena waitii Ogilby, 1908

Synonyms
- Sphyraena waitei Ogilby, 1908; Sphyraena waiteii Ogilby, 1908; Sphyraena waittei Ogilby, 1908

Species of ray-finned fish

Sphyraena waitii is a species of ray-finned fish within the family Sphyraenidae (barracudas). It is endemic to the Indo-Pacific Ocean, where it lives on coasts along eastern Australia fromsouthern Queensland to eastern Victoria at depths of 5 to 45 meters in pelagic-neritic environments. Individuals can grow up to 31 centimeters in length.
