= Shortfin barracuda =

Shortfin barracuda may refer to:

- Australian barracuda, a fish found mainly outside Australia and New Zealand
- Shortfin Barracuda-class submarine, a submarine class proposed for Australia's Collins-class replacement
