= Sphyraena arabiansis =

Arabian barracuda

Scientific classification
- Kingdom: Animalia
- Phylum: Chordata
- Class: Actinopterygii
- Order: Carangiformes
- Suborder: Centropomoidei
- Family: Sphyraenidae
- Genus: Sphyraena
- Species: S. arabiansis

Binomial name
- Sphyraena arabiansis Abdussamad & Retheesh, 2015

Species of barracuda

Sphyraena arabiansis commonly known as the Arabian barracuda Is a species of barracuda found in the eastern Arabian Sea. Once thought to be a population of the great barracuda they are now considered distinct due to morphological and genetic differences.

== Distribution ==
Discovered off the coast of Kerala in Southwest India and around the Lakshadweep Islands. They are also known to occur in other parts of the Arabian sea such as off the coast of Pakistan.

== Distinction ==
Arabian barracudas are closely related to the great barracuda but are distinguished by having many small cycloid scales down the length of the body, a lack of black spots, a rounded maxilla that ends before and below the anterior margin of the eye, and their Lateral line curves before the origin of the dorsal fin. These morphological differences along with a few others and genetic differences distinguish the two species.
