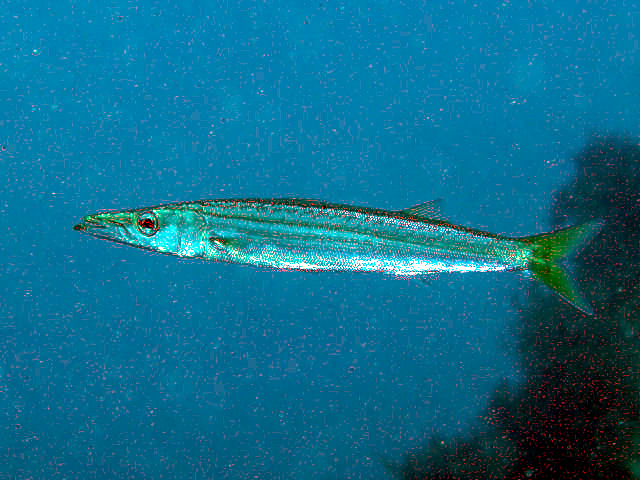

Scientific classification
- Kingdom: Animalia
- Phylum: Chordata
- Class: Actinopterygii
- Order: Carangiformes
- Suborder: Centropomoidei
- Family: Sphyraenidae
- Genus: Sphyraena
- Species: S. japonica

Binomial name
- Sphyraena japonica Bloch & J. G. Schneider, 1801

Synonyms
- Sphyraena japonica Cuvier, 1829

= Japanese barracuda =

Species of ray-finned fish

The Japanese barracuda (Sphyraena japonica) is a species of ray-finned fish of the family Sphyraenidae, which can be found in West Pacific ocean near southern Japan as well as in the South China Sea.
