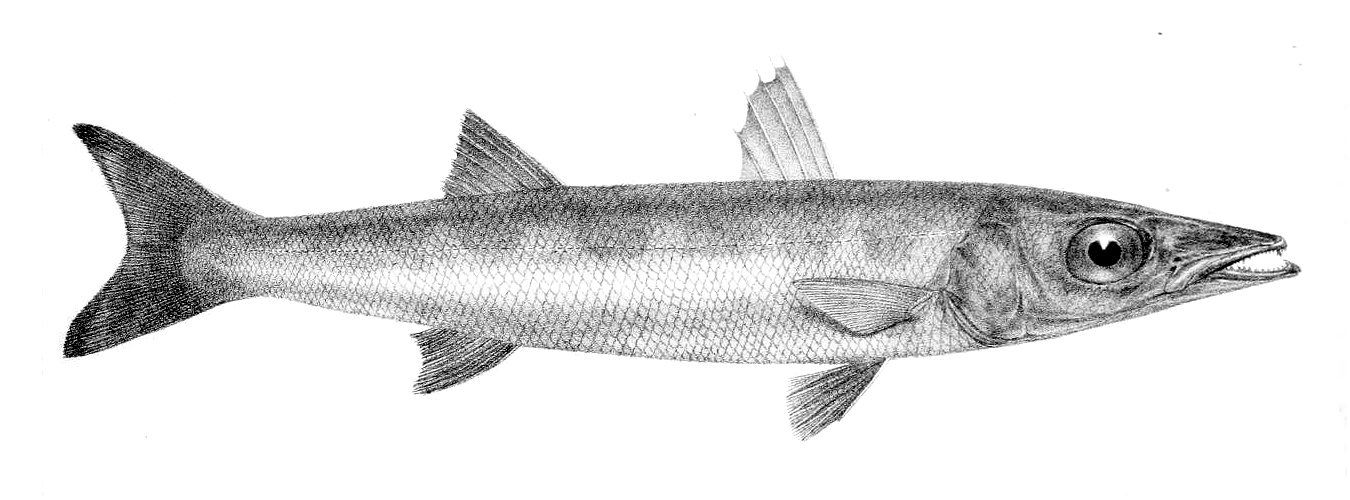

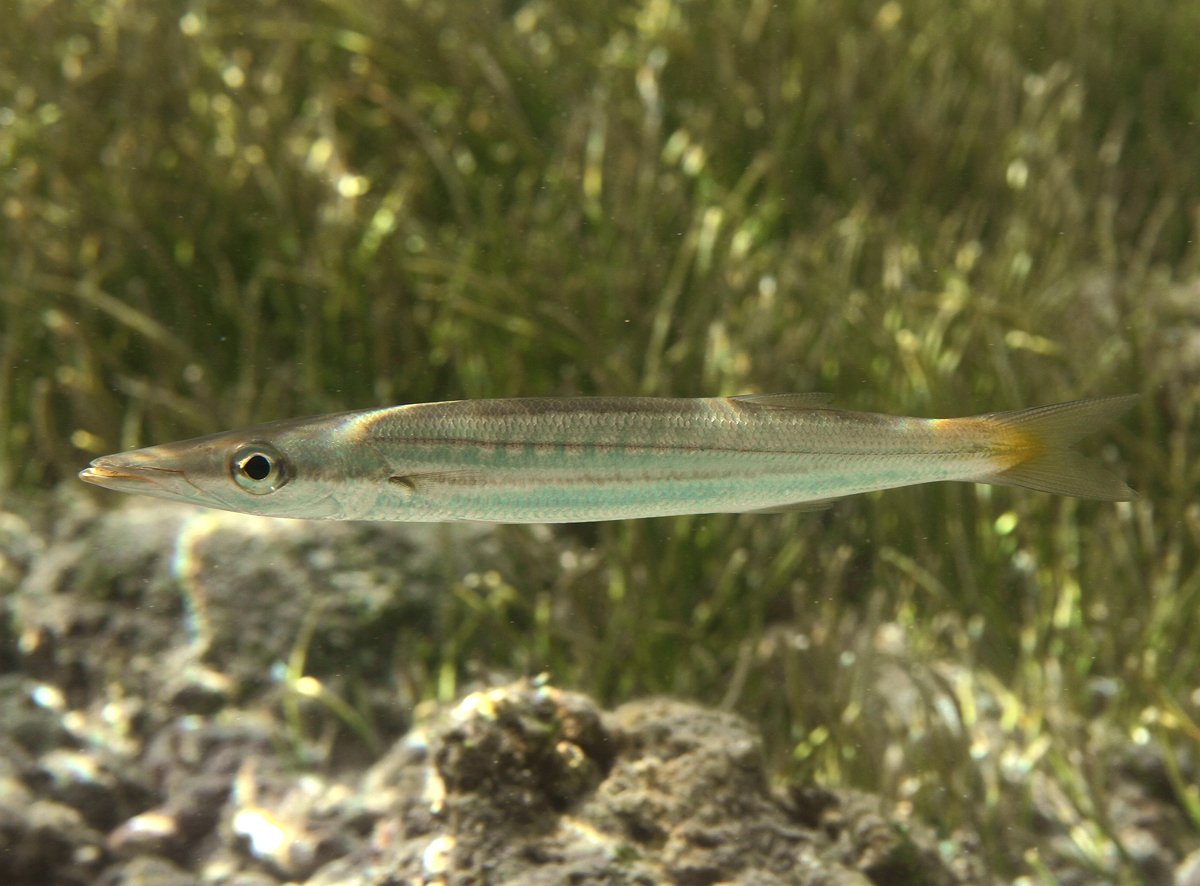

Scientific classification
- Kingdom: Animalia
- Phylum: Chordata
- Class: Actinopterygii
- Order: Carangiformes
- Suborder: Centropomoidei
- Family: Sphyraenidae
- Genus: Sphyraena
- Species: S. obtusata

Binomial name
- Sphyraena obtusata Cuvier, 1829

= Obtuse barracuda =

Species of ray-finned fish

The obtuse barracuda, Sphyraena obtusata, a barracuda of the family Sphyraenidae, is found in tropical oceans around the world. Its length is up to 55 cm.

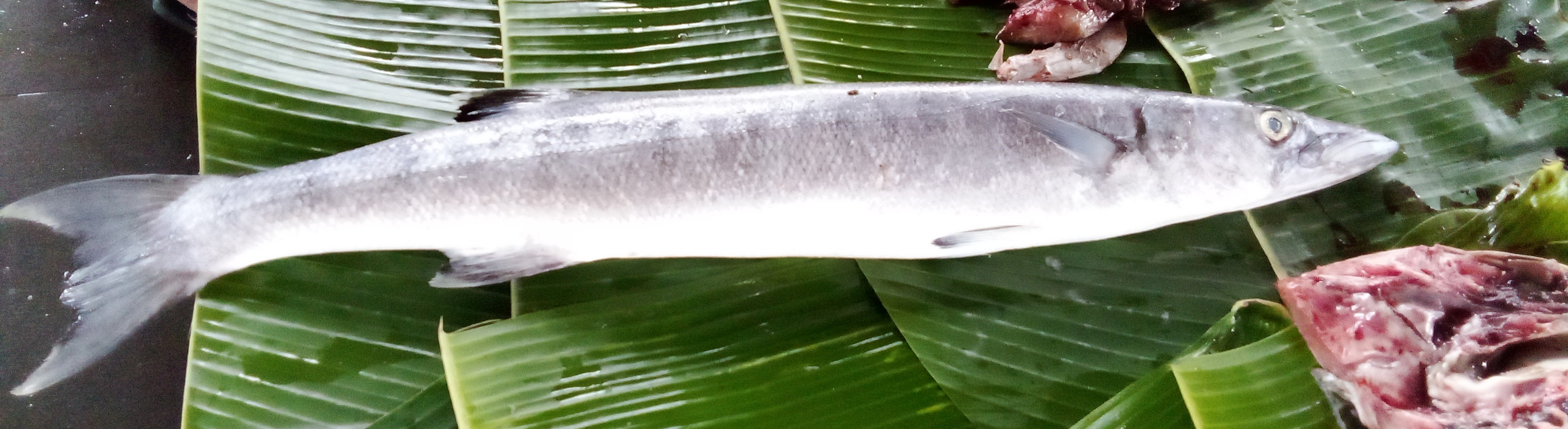
Obtuse barracuda in Aceh
