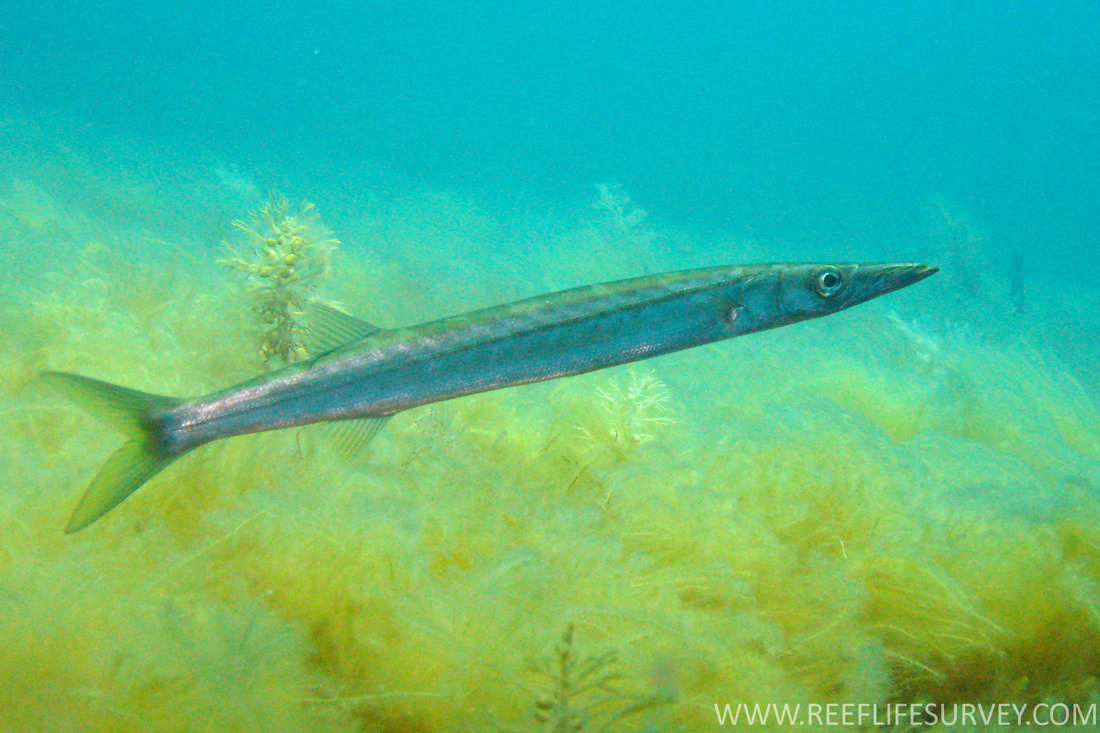

Scientific classification
- Kingdom: Animalia
- Phylum: Chordata
- Class: Actinopterygii
- Order: Carangiformes
- Suborder: Centropomoidei
- Family: Sphyraenidae
- Genus: Sphyraena
- Species: S. novaehollandiae

Binomial name
- Sphyraena novaehollandiae Günther, 1860

Synonyms
- Australuzza novaehollandiae (Günther, 1860); Sphyraena uoraebolandiae Gunther 1860

= Australian barracuda =

Species of fish

The Australian barracuda, arrow barracuda, Australian sea pike, sea pike, snook, or shortfin barracuda, Sphyraena novaehollandiae, is a barracuda of the genus Sphyraena which occurs in the south-western Pacific Ocean.

== Description ==
The Australian barracuda is greenish on the back, silvery on flanks which fades to white on the belly with a greenish-yellow tail. It has the typical fusiform shape of a barracuda, but it is slimmer than most other species of Sphyraena with a conical snout and a protruding lower jaw, the jaws are lined with fang like teeth and the upper jaw is non-protracting. The origin of the dorsal fin is well behind the end of the pectoral fins. It reaches a maximum length of 1.1m and a weight of 5 kg.

== Distribution ==
The Australian barracuda is distributed along the south coast of Australia and along the east coast to Victoria and Tasmania. It has also been recorded from northern New Zealand and Kiribati with doubtful records from South Africa, the Maldives and Japan but these may be the result of misidentification, confusion with related species masking the true distribution.

== Ecology and biology ==
The Australian barracuda prefers cooler inshore waters, preferring patches of seagrass Zostera or Heterozostera or seaweed or sandy areas close to weed patches or reefs. It is a pelagic species, which congregates in large shoals and is highly migratory. Their food is made up of smaller fish, cephalopods, crustaceans and bloodworms, it is referred to as an ambush feeder but is also known to actively pursue prey. It appears the Australian barracuda is an opportunistic predator, able to exploit almost any potential prey species, and the variety of prey taken suggests that it hunts at all levels of the water column, taking demersal species such as Haletta semifasciata and Metapenaeopsis prawns and pelagic species such as pilchards, southern sea garfish and squid.

The Australian barracuda has a short spawning season which runs from November to January and February in South Australia. Most females reproduce once they have attained a length of 42 cm which length is normally reached after around 2 years old. Spawning is probably done in a series of batches. During spawning the fish are absent from their normal habitats and this is suggestive that they migrate offshore to spawn in deeper water. The females lay and average total of 375,000 eggs in a season, their fecundity increasing with their size. This species can live for up to 20 years.

== Fisheries ==
The Australian barracuda is subject to a small commercial fishery in South Australia. It is a popular fish with recreational anglers in Australia.
