= Sennett =

Sennett may refer to:

- Blake Sennett (born 1973), American musician
- George Burritt Sennett (1840–1900), American ornithologist and businessman
- Mack Sennett (1880–1960), Canadian movie director
- Maud Arncliffe Sennett (1862–1935) British suffragette
- Richard Sennett (born 1943), American sociologist
- Sennett, New York, a town in New York, United States

== See also ==
- Sennet (disambiguation)
- Senet, a board game from ancient Egypt
- Senate, a deliberative assembly
