= Southern sennet =

Scientific classification
- Kingdom: Animalia
- Phylum: Chordata
- Class: Actinopterygii
- Order: Carangiformes
- Suborder: Centropomoidei
- Family: Sphyraenidae
- Genus: Sphyraena
- Species: S. picudilla

Binomial name
- Sphyraena picudilla Poey, 1860

Species of fish

The southern sennet (Sphyraena picudilla) is an ocean-going species of game fish in the barracuda family, Sphyraenidae. It was described by the Cuban zoologist Felipe Poey. The description was part of a two-volume work, which Poey published in 1860, entitled Historia Natural de la Isla de Cuba or Natural History of the Island of Cuba. Southern sennet are sometimes used as a food fish, and marketed either fresh or frozen. Although they are generally harmless, Southern sennet have been linked to ciguatera poisoning.

== Description ==
Southern sennet, like other members of the family Sphyraenidae, possess elongated bodies, pike-like heads, and large jaws. The lower jaw protrudes slightly from the upper jaw, both of which contain fang-like teeth. They have two dorsal fins, which are widely separated on their backs. The anterior dorsal fin usually possesses spines, while the posterior only has rays. Southern sennet have six spines, and 9 rays on their dorsal fins. they have only two spines and 9 rays on their anal fins. The longest recorded southern sennet was 2 ft long; the greatest recorded weight was 2 lbs 8 oz.

== Distribution and habitat ==
Southern sennet are known only from the western Atlantic Ocean from Bermuda, Florida, and the Bahamas south to Uruguay. They are found in tropical climates from 32°N to 38°S. Southern sennet live in coastal waters near reefs, although they are more common over muddy bottoms, at depths from 1–65 m, where they often occur in large schools near the surface. Juveniles are commonly found over beds of seagrasses.
