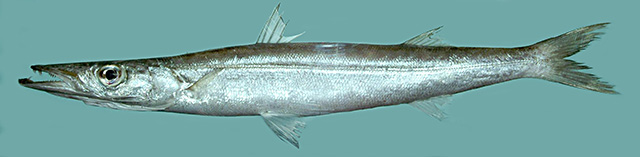

Conservation status
- Least Concern (IUCN 3.1)

Scientific classification
- Kingdom: Animalia
- Phylum: Chordata
- Class: Actinopterygii
- Order: Carangiformes
- Suborder: Centropomoidei
- Family: Sphyraenidae
- Genus: Sphyraena
- Species: S. borealis

Binomial name
- Sphyraena borealis De Kay, 1842

= Northern sennet =

Species of fish

The northern sennet, Sphyraena borealis, is an ocean-going species of fish in the barracuda family, Sphyraenidae. It was described by the American zoologist James Ellsworth De Kay in 1842. De Kay's description was part of several volumes he published regarding the fauna of New York from 1842-1849. Northern sennet are also known as northern barracuda. While generally considered a gamefish it has only rarely been used as food by humans.

== Description ==
Like other members of the family Sphyraenidae, northern sennet have elongated bodies, pike-like heads, and large jaws. The lower jaw protrudes slightly from the upper jaw, both of which contain fang-like teeth. They have two dorsal fins, which are widely separated on their backs. The anterior dorsal fin usually possesses spines, while the posterior only has rays. Northern sennet have 24 vertebrae. They also have five or six spines on their dorsal fins and 9 rays. Their anal fins have only two spines and 7-9 rays. Northern sennet can grow to be up to 46 cm in length, but they are generally considered the smallest of the barracudas - with many adults growing to less than 1 ft (0.3 m) in length, and the greatest recorded weight being only 0.93 kg.

Northern sennet are olive-colored, dorsally, and silvery-white ventrally. They also have several dusky blotches along their lateral lines.

== Distribution and habitat ==
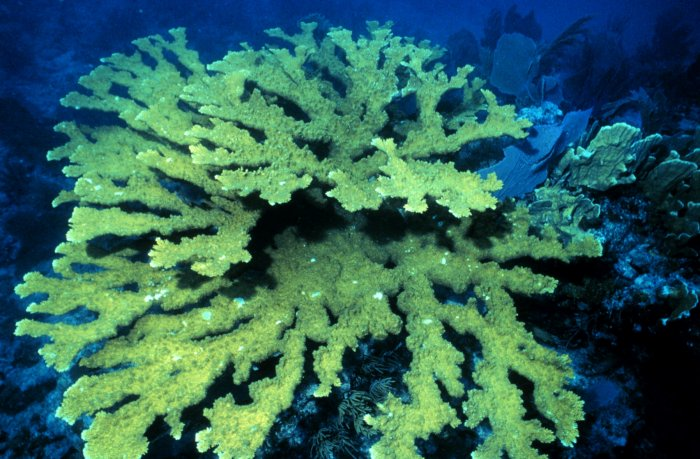
Reefs, such as this one made of elkhorn coral, serve as habitats to northern sennet off southern Florida.

Northern sennet can only be found in the western Atlantic Ocean. Although they normally occur in subtropical climates from 43°N - 18°N latitudes, they can be found from Canada and Massachusetts to southern Florida, the Gulf of Mexico, where they are generally reef associated, and the eastern coast of Panama.
