= Cynet =

Cynet may be:

- Cynetart, an arts festival
- CYNET, the NREN (National Research & Education Network) of Cyprus
- Cynet, a cyber security company.
