= Scinet =

Scinet may refer to:

- SCinet, high-performance network built annually at the International Conference for High Performance Computing and Communications
- SciNet Consortium, Canadian consortium for high-performance computing
