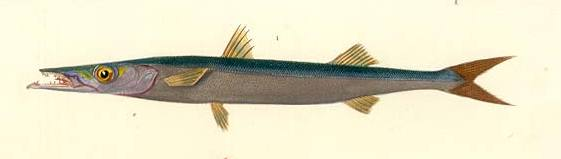

Conservation status
- Least Concern (IUCN 3.1)

Scientific classification
- Kingdom: Animalia
- Phylum: Chordata
- Class: Actinopterygii
- Order: Carangiformes
- Suborder: Centropomoidei
- Family: Sphyraenidae
- Genus: Sphyraena
- Species: S. sphyraena

Binomial name
- Sphyraena sphyraena Linnaeus, 1758

Synonyms
- Esox sphyraena Linnaeus 1758; Esox spet Haüy, 1787; Sphyraena spet (Haüy, 1787); Sphyraena vulgaris Cuvier, 1829; Sphyraena bocagei Osório, 1891

= Sphyraena sphyraena =

Species of fish

Sphyraena sphyraena, also known as the European barracuda or Mediterranean barracuda, is a ray-finned predatory fish of the Mediterranean basin and the warmer waters of the Atlantic Ocean.

== Description ==
Sphyraena sphyraena has a long, compressed body with a circular cross-section covered with small, cycloid scales. It has a large mouth with an underbite, lined with prominent sharp teeth. It is dark above and silvery below, and in some freshly-caught specimens there is a yellow band parallel to the lateral line. It has 20 or 22 dark transverse bands on the back which do not reach the flanks. The anterior dorsal fin has 5 spiny rays, and the posterior has a single spiny ray and 9 soft rays. It has relatively small pectoral fins, and the pelvic fins are directly below the forwardmost point of the first dorsal fin; The anal fin has a one spiny ray and 9 soft rays. S. sphyraena has scales covering both the anterior and posterior margins of the preoperculum, whereas in Sphyraena viridensis both margins have no scales. They are normally around 30–60 cm (12–24 in) in length and weigh 3.6 kg (7.9 lb), but there are records of fish 165 cm (65 in) long and reaching weights of at least 5.6 kg (12 lb 6 oz). It is the largest species of barracuda in the Mediterranean.

== Distribution ==
In the Eastern Atlantic Sphyraena sphyraena is found from the Bay of Biscay in the north through the Canary Islands and the Azores to Mossamedes, Angola in the south. It is also found throughout the Mediterranean Sea and the Black Sea. It has been found as far north as Cornwall in the United Kingdom.

== Ecology ==
Sphyraena sphyraena is normally a pelagic species found high in the water column, but smaller fish often found near bottom of the water column. The main food is other fish but sometimes includes cephalopods and crustaceans. They are a social species and large groups of Sphyraena sphyraena numbering between ten and two hundred have been recorded. Reproduction occurs between May and August and the female can lay up to 300,000 eggs. The copepod Bomolochus unicirrus is known to be an ectoparasite of S. sphyraena.

== Fisheries ==
It is caught in some quantities by commercial fisheries and it is an important game fish. A decline in mean size and in the range of sizes caught has been noted in the eastern and southern Mediterranean and this may be an indication of over exploitation. Juvenile S. sphyraena are taken as bycatch in fisheries for small forage fish, such as sardines and anchovies, while the rather sedentary adults are vulnerable to other fishing pressures, including spearfishing.

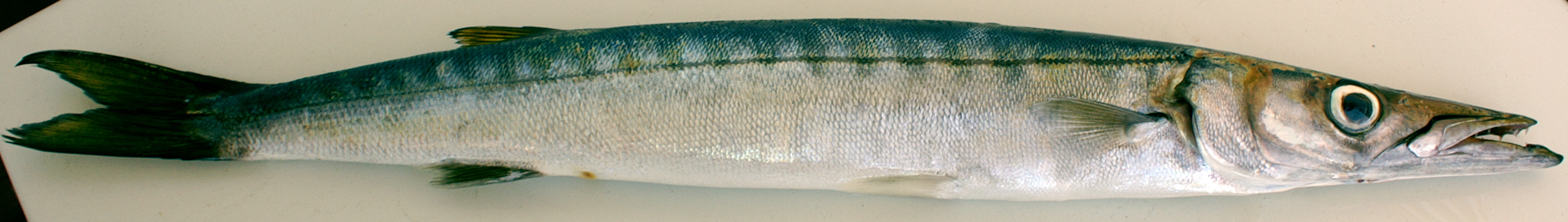
Barracuda
