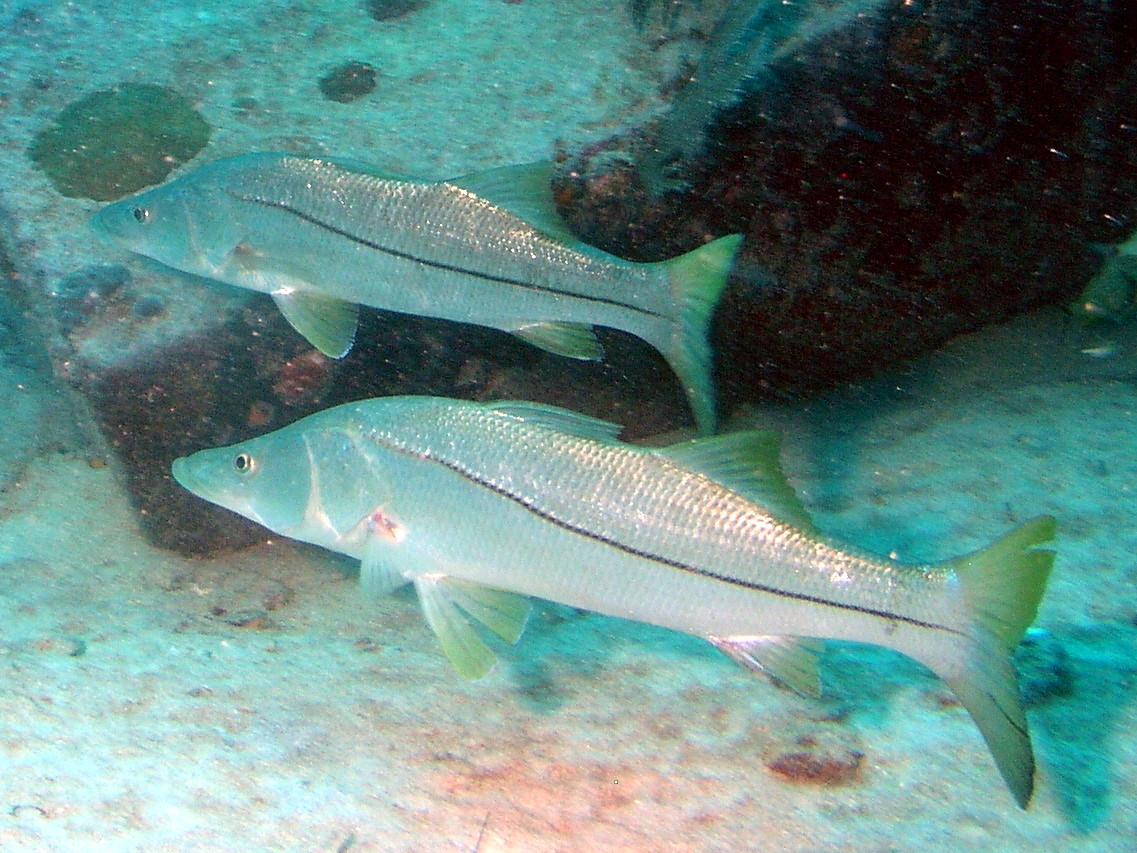
- Snooks, Centropomus sp.

Scientific classification
- Kingdom: Animalia
- Phylum: Chordata
- Class: Actinopterygii
- Order: Carangiformes
- Suborder: Centropomoidei; Girard et al., 2020

Families
- See text

= Centropomoidei =

Centropomoidei Temporal range: Late Paleocene–present

Suborder of fishes

Centropomoidei is a suborder of marine and freshwater ray-finned fish belonging to the order Carangiformes. Its families were previously placed elsewhere, but more recent studies have found them to form a distinct clade within the Carangiformes, as the most basal members of the order.

== Taxonomy ==
Suborder Centropomoidei

- Family Latidae Jordan 1888 (giant perches)
- Family Centropomidae Poey 1967 (snooks)
- Family Lactariidae Boulenger 1904 (false trevallies)
- Family Sphyraenidae Rafinesque 1815 (barracudas)

== See also ==
- Menoidei
