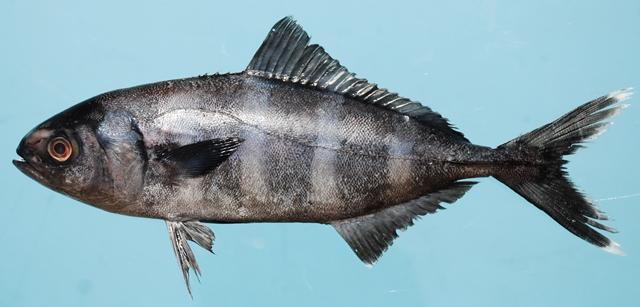
- Pilot fish (Naucrates ductor)

Scientific classification
- Kingdom: Animalia
- Phylum: Chordata
- Class: Actinopterygii
- Order: Carangiformes
- Suborder: Carangoidei
- Family: Carangidae
- Subfamily: Naucratinae; Bleeker, 1859

= Naucratinae =

Subfamily of fishes

Naucratinae is a subfamily of ray-finned fish from the family Carangidae which consists of five genera and 13 species.

== Genera ==
The following genera are classified within the Naucratinae:

- Campogramma Regan, 1903
- Elagatis F.D. Bennett, 1840
- Naucrates Rafinesque, 1810
- Seriola Bleeker, 1854
- Seriolina Wakiya, 1924

The following cladogram is based on a 2023 phylogenetic analysis which studied the UCEs of various marine fish:

- Carangidae
  - Caranginae
  - Naucratinae
    - - - - - - Seriola dumerili
              - Seriola rivoliana
            - Seriolina nigrofasciata
          - Seriola hippos
        - - - - Seriola lalandi
              - Naucrates ductor
            - Seriola quinqueradiata
          - Seriola zonata
      - Seriola fasciata
    - Elagatis bipinnulata
