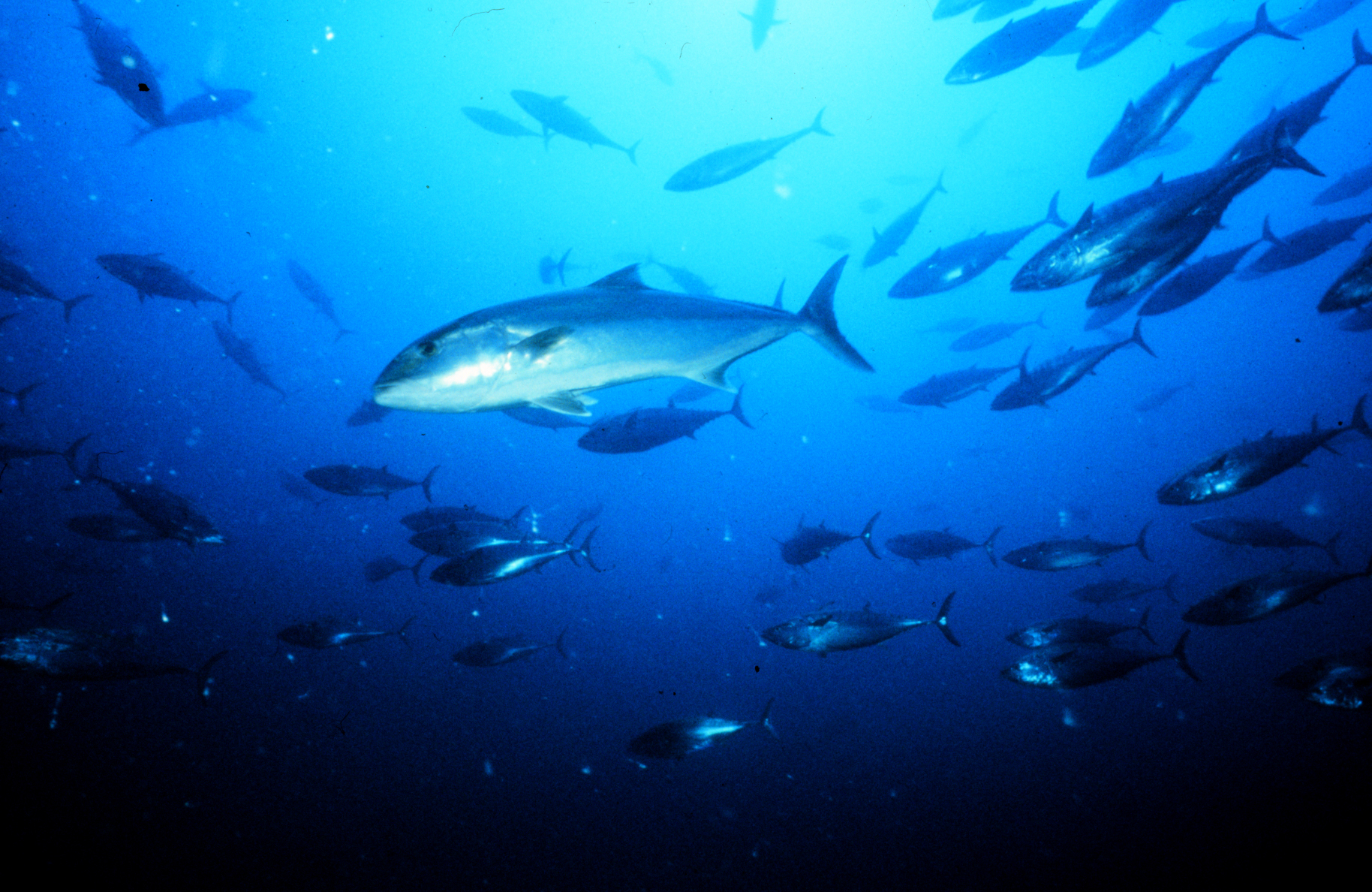
- Greater amberjack, Seriola dumerili off the coast of North Carolina

Scientific classification
- Kingdom: Animalia
- Phylum: Chordata
- Class: Actinopterygii
- Order: Carangiformes
- Suborder: Carangoidei
- Family: Carangidae
- Subfamily: Naucratinae
- Genus: Seriola

= Amberjack =

Genus of fishes

Amberjacks are Atlantic and Pacific fish in the genus Seriola of the family Carangidae. They are widely consumed across the world in various cultures, most notably for Pacific amberjacks in Japanese cuisine; they are most often found in the warmer parts of the oceans. The many species of amberjack include greater amberjack (Atlantic), lesser amberjack (Atlantic), Almaco jack (Pacific), yellowtail (Pacific), and banded rudderfish (Atlantic). Though most of the Seriola species are considered "amberjacks", the species Seriola hippos (samson fish) is not.

== Species ==
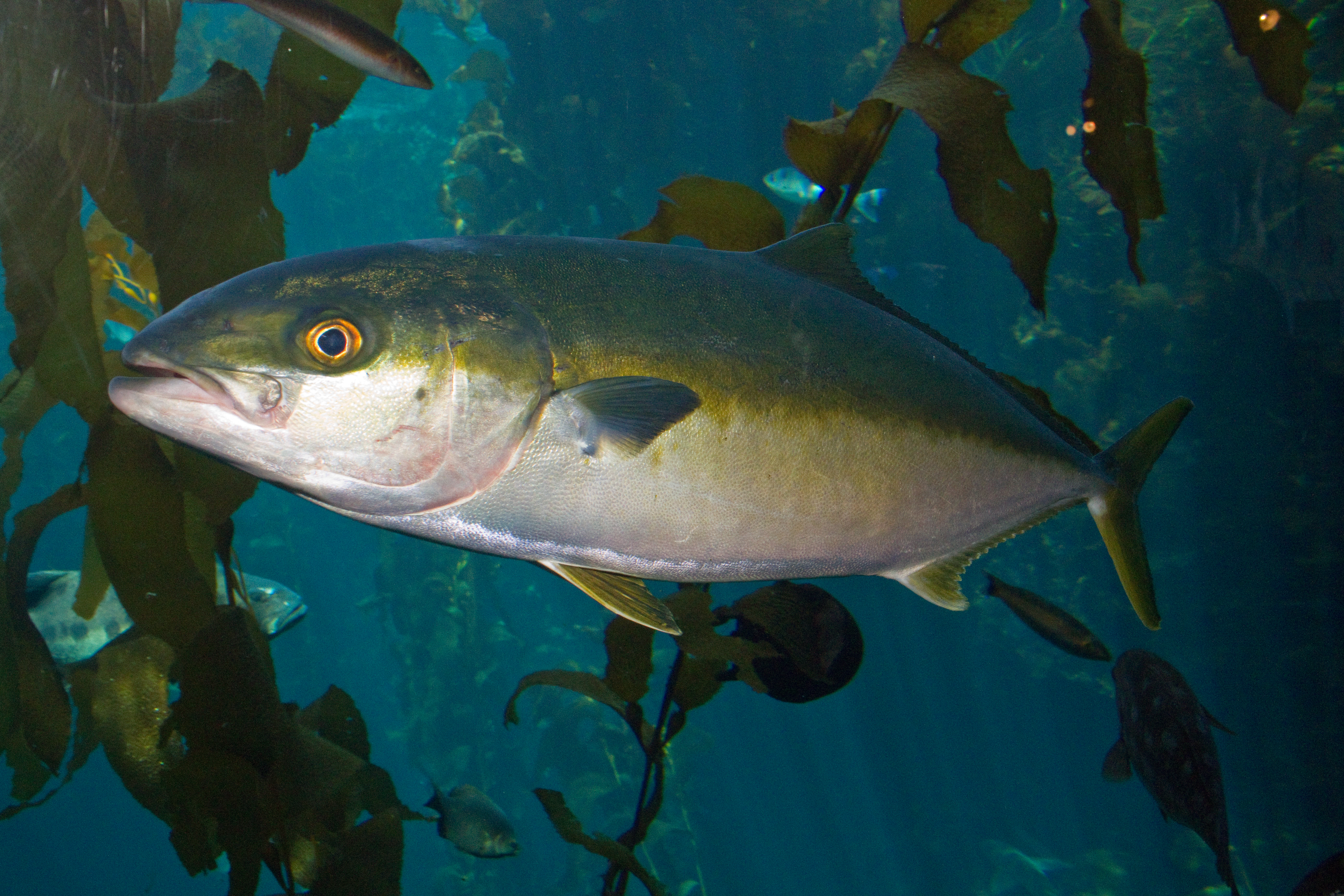
Yellowtail amberjack

=== Greater amberjacks ===
Greater amberjacks, S. dumerili, are the largest of the jacks. They usually have dark stripes extending from nose to in front of their dorsal fins. They have no scutes and soft dorsal bases less than twice the length of the anal fin bases. They are usually 18 kg (40 pounds) or less and are found associated with rocky reefs, debris, and wrecks, typically in 20 to 75 m (10 to 40 fathoms). Greater amberjacks are also found in the Pacific.

=== Lesser amberjacks ===
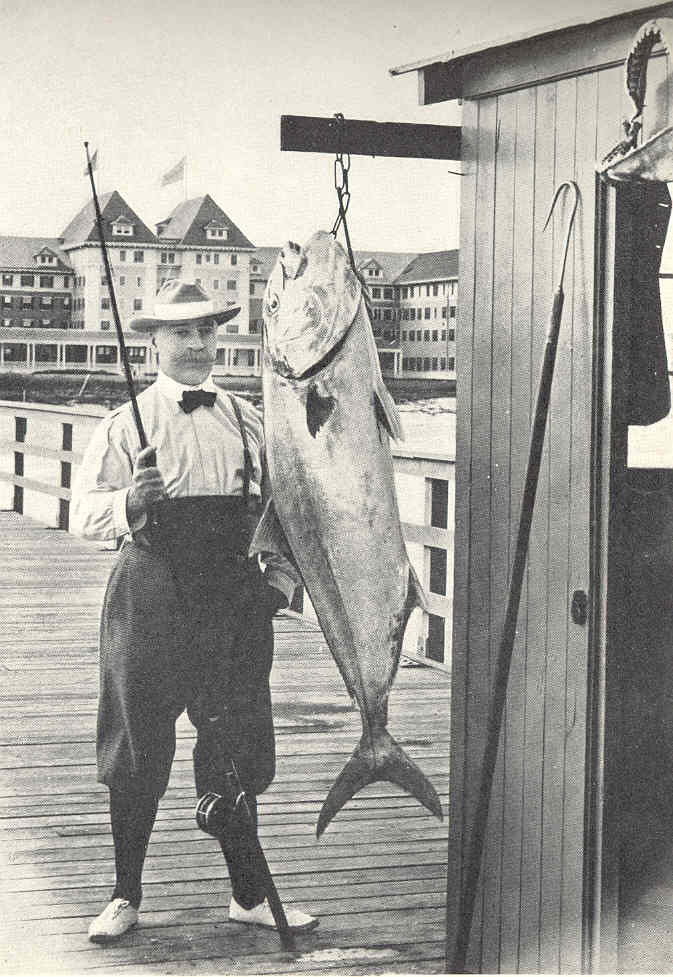
Amberjack caught at Palm Beach, Florida, in 1910

Lesser amberjacks, S. fasciata, have proportionately larger eyes and deeper bodies than greater amberjacks. They are olive green or brownish-black with silver sides and usually have a dark band extending upward from their eyes. Juveniles have split or wavy bars on their sides. The adults are usually under 5.0 kg (11 lb). They are found deeper than other jacks, commonly 50 to 130 m (30 to 70 fathoms).

Amberjacks are voracious predators, which feed on squid, fish, and crustaceans, and are thought to spawn offshore throughout most of the year.

Juveniles can be caught in about 25 feet (7.6 m) of water near floating objects.

=== Banded rudderfish ===
Banded rudderfish, S. zonata, is the second-smallest amberjack. This jack can be distinguished from the pilot fish by the presence of a first dorsal fin. Juveniles are banded vertically like pilotfish, and follow large objects or animals. Large individuals (over 10 in) have no bands. This fish, though commonly caught, is rarely identified. Large ones, with a raccoon-stripe on the eye and an iridescent gold stripe on the side, are usually called amberjacks when caught, and juveniles are called pilotfish. They are found as far north as Nova Scotia. They are less dependent on sharks, etc., than pilotfish. They can be caught on shrimp, silversides, lures (e.g. spoons), and flies.

=== Other regions ===
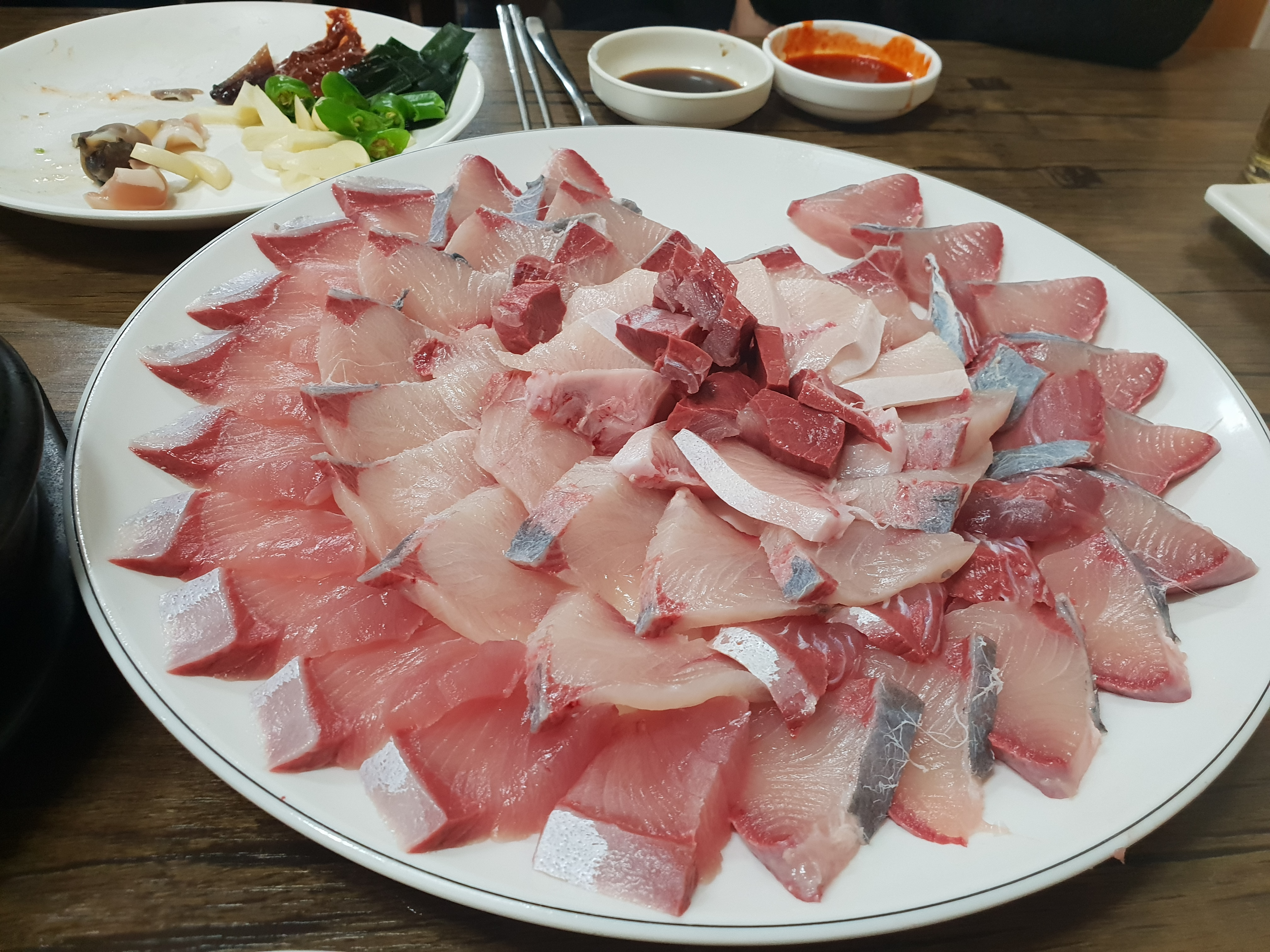
Japanese amberjack served as a raw dish (hoe) in Daegu, South Korea

Other species exist in other parts of the world, such as the yellowtail amberjack (including the Asian yellowtail, the California yellowtail, and yellowtail kingfish or southern yellowtail), Almaco jack, and Japanese amberjack (five-ray yellowtail).

== Behavior ==
Amberjacks are predators. They primarily feed on pelagic and benthic fish, though their prey also includes squid, crustaceans, sardines, and bigeye scad. Younger juvenile jacks tend to feed on plankton and small invertebrates.

Greater amberjacks mature around 4 years old, and migrate in late spring to early summer (March to June) to reproduce. They migrate to deeper water to spawn, producing their young near shipwrecks or large objects as a safe haven.

Females are much larger than males, and have a longer life expectancy. The maximum lifespan for females is 17 years, whilst the average is 10 due to popular demand for them in big game fishing and as a high-quality food fish.

Amberjacks are not at top of the food chain in their habitat, so are prey for yellowfin tuna, sharks, and other larger fish.
