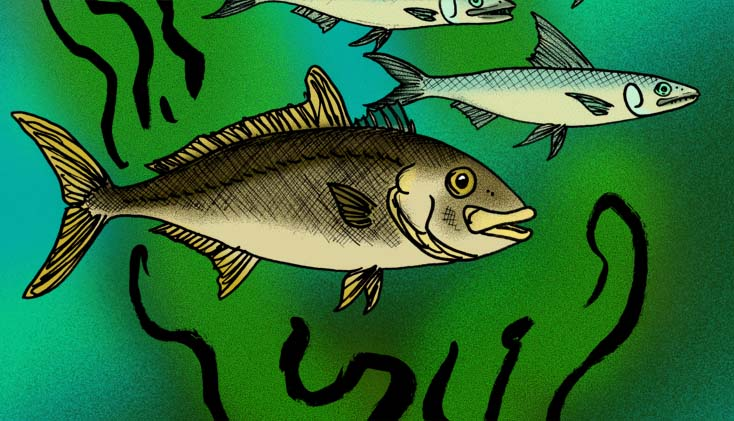
- Life restoration of S. sanctaebarbarae with Drimys

Scientific classification
- Domain: Eukaryota
- Kingdom: Animalia
- Phylum: Chordata
- Class: Actinopterygii
- Order: Carangiformes
- Suborder: Carangoidei
- Family: Carangidae
- Genus: Seriola
- Species: †S. sanctaebarbarae

Binomial name
- †Seriola sanctaebarbarae Jordan, 1921

Synonyms
- S. sanctae-barbarae (alternate spelling)

= Seriola sanctaebarbarae =

Seriola sanctaebarbarae Temporal range: Late Miocene

Extinct species of fish

Seriola sanctaebarbarae (named after the city of Santa Barbara) is an extinct species of marine ray-finned fish known from the Late Miocene of California, USA. It is known from the presumably Tortonian-aged diatomite deposits of the Monterey Formation near Lompoc.

It was a close relative of modern amberjacks, belonging to the same genus as them (Seriola). Its morphology differs from that of the modern California yellowtail (S. dorsalis) that now occupies the California coast, and resembles that of the older species S. prisca from the Early Eocene of Italy and S. natgeosoc from the Middle Eocene (Bartonian) of North Caucasus, Russia. The species Hemicaranx archaeus, also found in the same formation, appears to be synonymous with it.

It was a large species that could grow up to 27.5 inches (70 cm).
