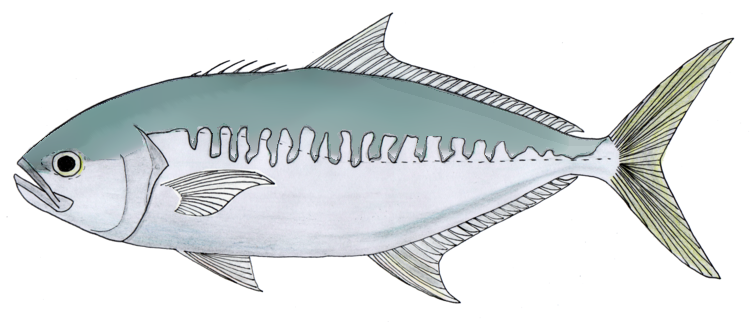

Conservation status
- Least Concern (IUCN 3.1)

Scientific classification
- Kingdom: Animalia
- Phylum: Chordata
- Class: Actinopterygii
- Division: Teleostei
- Order: Carangiformes
- Suborder: Carangoidei
- Family: Carangidae
- Subfamily: Naucratinae
- Genus: Campogramma; Regan, 1903
- Species: C. glaycos

Binomial name
- Campogramma glaycos (Lacépède, 1801)
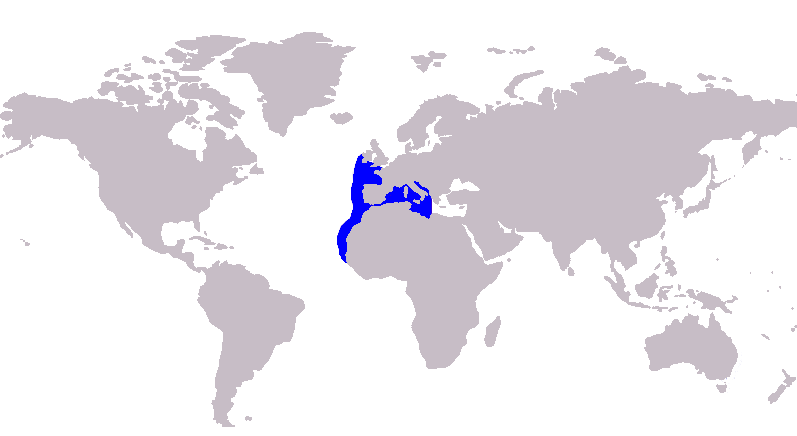
- Approximate range of the vadigo

Synonyms
- List: Centronotus glaycos, Lacepède, 1801; Campogramma vadigo, (Risso, 1810); Oligoplites africana, Delsman, 1941; Solagmedens africana, (Delsman, 1941); Campogramma lirio, Dollfus, 1955

= Vadigo =

Species of fish

The vadigo, Campogramma glaycos (also known as the big-toothed pompano, zippered pompano, lexa and lexola), is a species of medium-sized coastal marine fish in the jack family, Carangidae. The species is distributed throughout the eastern Atlantic Ocean from the British Isles in the north to Senegal in the south, also entering the western Mediterranean Sea. The vadigo is similar in form to both the leatherjacks and the queenfish, but can be distinguished by its scaleless chest and a broad, rounded upper jaw. It is a predatory fish, preying mostly on smaller schooling fishes. The species was initially classified under the genus Centronotus before being transferred to its own monotypic genus of Campogramma. The vadigo is of minor commercial importance throughout its range, and is also considered to be a game fish.

== Taxonomy and naming ==
The vadigo is the only species classified in the monotypic genus Campogramma, which itself is one of 31 genera in the family Carangidae, which contains the jacks, horse mackerels and pompanos. The Carangidae were classified as Perciform fishes in the suborder Percoidei, but most authorities now classify the carangids in the order Carangiformes along with the remoras, dolphinfishes and related families.

The species was first scientifically described by Bernard Germain de Lacépède in 1801 under the name of Centronotus glaycos. In 1903, Charles Tate Regan transferred the species to a new genus, Campogramma, creating the valid combination in use today (Centronotus is now considered a synonym of Naucrates). The species has two junior synonyms, the first was described in 1941 as Oligoplites africana by Delsman and the second in 1955 by Dollfus, who named Campogramma lirio. Early phylogenetic treatments of the species placed it in the subfamily Trachinotinae without substantiating evidence. A review of the genus by Smith-Vaniz and Staiger cited several anatomical characters which were incompatible with the Trachinotinae, however would group it within the Naucratinae. They further suggested it was a close relative of Seriola, which was later reaffirmed by a comprehensive overview of the carangids by Gushiken. In this study, it was found to be most closely related to the rainbow runner, Elegatis bipinnulata, with both Campogramma and Elegatis basal members of Naucratinae. No recent genetic studies have investigated the species.

The species is commonly known as the vadigo, which is the designated FishBase name, as well as the big-toothed pompano, zippered pompano, lexa and lexola.

== Description ==
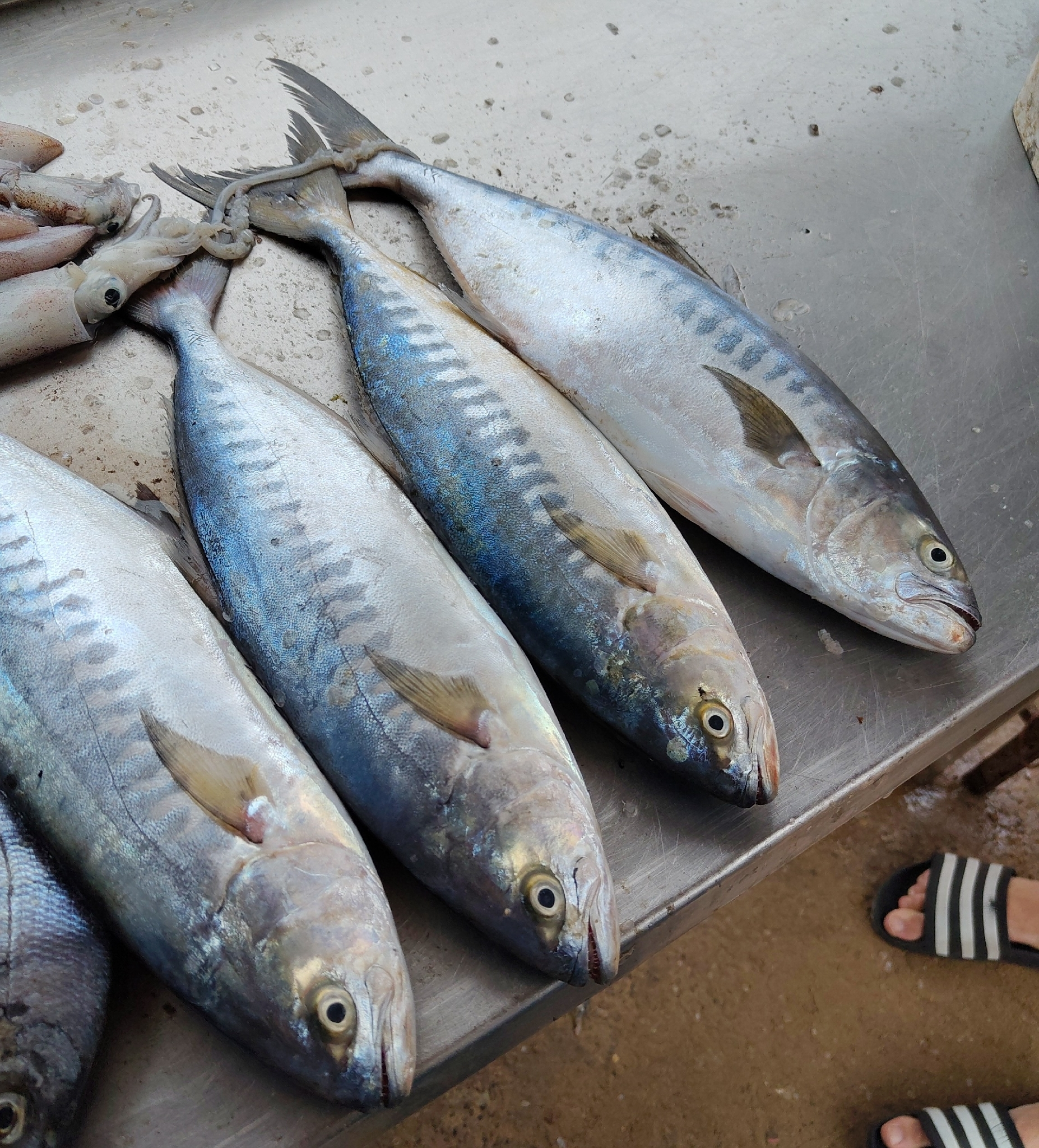
In Morocco

The vadigo is similar in form to other carangids, particularly the genera Oligoplites and Scomberoides, commonly known as queenfish and leatherjacks. It is a moderately large fish growing to 60 cm (24 in), although some less reliable sources state a maximum length of 65 cm (26 in). The maximum published weight of 2.8 kg (6.2 lb). It has an elongate, moderately deep and slightly compressed body, with the dorsal profile slightly more convex than the ventral profile. The upper jaw is broad and rounded at its end with a single row of large, widely spaced canines in both the upper and lower jaw. The dorsal fin is in two parts; the first consisting of 6 or 7 short, often unconnected spines while the second dorsal fin consists of a single spine followed by 26 to 28 sof rays. The anal fin is similar in appearance to the second dorsal fin, having two detached spines followed by one spine attached to 23 to 25 soft rays. Both the ventral and pectoral fins are short, with the ventral consisting of one spine followed by 5 soft rays and the pectoral having 17 rays. The caudal fin is large and highly forked having 30 rays in total. The body is covered in small ctenoid scales except for part of the chest area which is naked. The species has no scutes. The vadigo has 24 vertebrae in total, and has 4 to 6 upper gill rakers and 9 to 12 lower rakers.

The vadigo has a steel blue to green upper body extending to midway down its side where the darker colour terminates in a series of zig-zagging lobes, with the ventral colour being silver to white. All fins are hyaline to grey with the exception of the caudal fin which is often yellowish.

== Distribution and habitat ==
The vadigo inhabits the eastern Atlantic Ocean only, distributed from The British Isles in the north to Senegal in the south, with the species also found around distant offshore islands including Madeira and the Canary Islands. The species is also common in the western Mediterranean Sea, where it has recently been found to extend as far north as the Adriatic Sea. The authors who reported this northern capture believe this shows an expansion of the vadigo's range, comparing it to a number of other carangid species who have recently been found outside of their normal range.

The adults of the species are pelagic or epibenthic, inhabiting mostly shallow waters between 15 and 30 m in depth. It moves to more coastal waters during the summer in the Mediterranean.

== Biology and fishery ==
The vadigo is a predatory fish, which takes smaller species of schooling fish as its primary prey. Little is known of its reproduction and growth, with only a single juvenile described in scientific literature. The eggs of the species are known to be pelagic and occur in a single seasonal peak each year, suggesting the species has a single spawning event annually.

The species is of minor importance to commercial fisheries throughout its range, often taken by bottom and pelagic trawls. It is typically sold fresh, frozen or dried and salted and is also used for production of fishmeal and oil. It is considered to be a good table fish. Vadigo are occasionally caught by recreational fishermen, and are considered to be a fine sports fish. They may be caught on fish baits or lures, and are most abundant in the Mediterranean between July and September.
