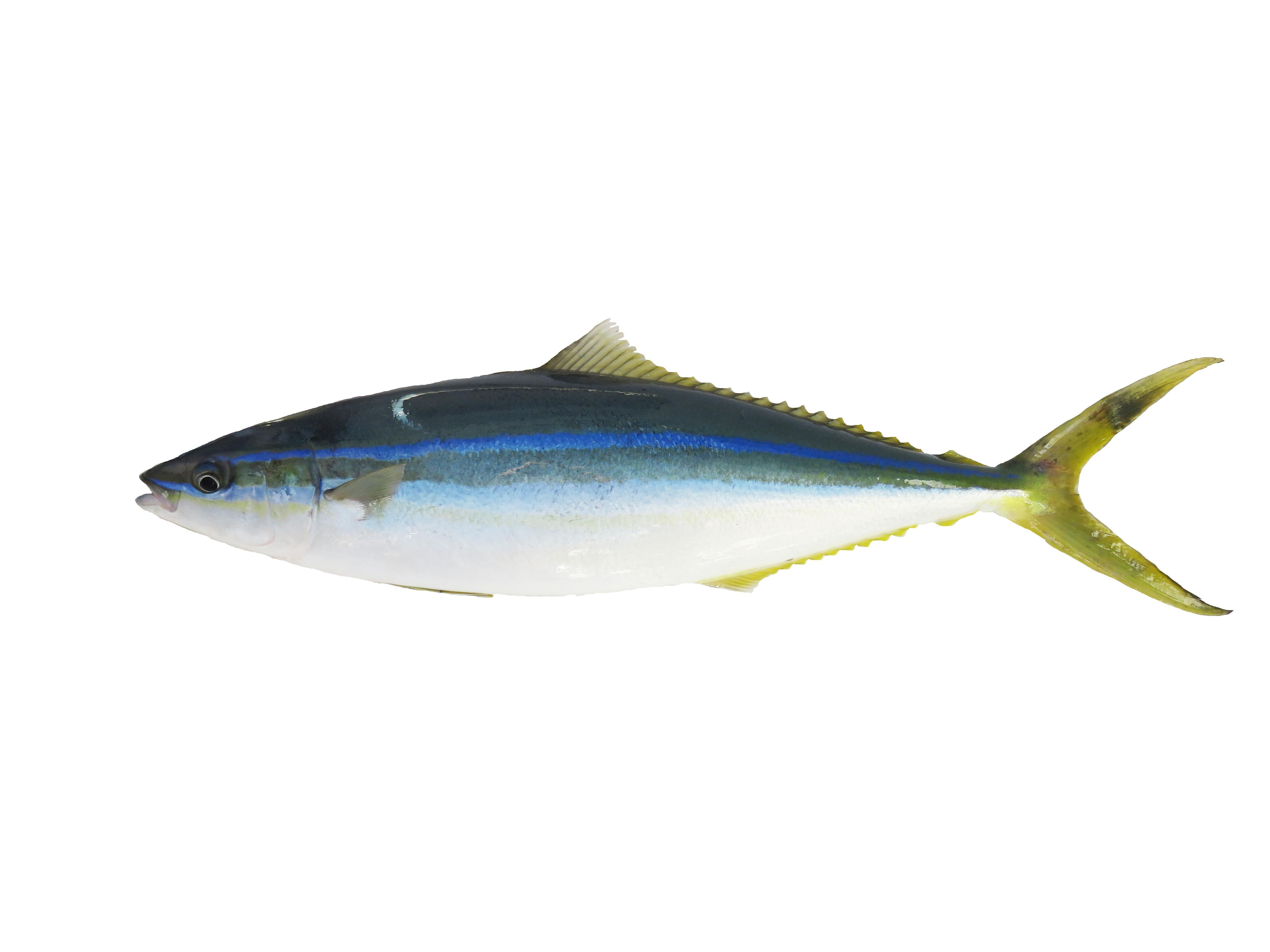

Conservation status
- Least Concern (IUCN 3.1)

Scientific classification
- Kingdom: Animalia
- Phylum: Chordata
- Class: Actinopterygii
- Order: Carangiformes
- Suborder: Carangoidei
- Family: Carangidae
- Subfamily: Naucratinae
- Genus: Elagatis; F.D. Bennett, 1840
- Species: E. bipinnulata

Binomial name
- Elagatis bipinnulata (Quoy & Gaimard, 1825)
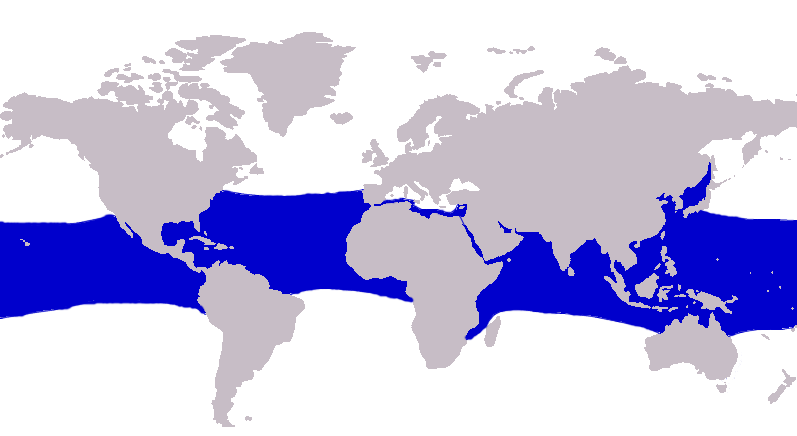
- Approximate range of the rainbow runner

Synonyms
- Seriola bipinnulata, Quoy and Gaimard, 1825; Seriolichthys bipinnulatus, (Quoy and Gaimard, 1825); Micropteryx bipinnulatus, (Quoy and Gaimard, 1825); Elagatis bipinnulatus, (Quoy and Gaimard, 1825); Irex indicus, Valenciennes, 1862

= Rainbow runner =

Species of fish

The rainbow runner (Elagatis bipinnulata), also known as the rainbow yellowtail, Spanish jack and Hawaiian salmon, is a common species of pelagic marine fish of the jack family, Carangidae. The species is widespread throughout the tropical and subtropical waters of the world, inhabiting both coastal and offshore areas. The species is the only member of the genus Elagatis, which was created 15 years after its initial description, and is closely related to the amberjacks. The rainbow runner is easily distinguished by its body shape, and the brilliant colouration which gives the fish its name. It is a fast-swimming predator, taking small fish, cephalopods, and a wide variety of planktonic crustaceans. The species reaches sexual maturity around 60 cm (24 in), and spawning takes place at different times, with some populations spawning year round, while others only spawn at certain times of the year. The species is a well known game fish, taken by a variety of fishing methods, and is a well-regarded table fish. Large numbers of the species are taken as bycatch in tuna- and shark-fishing operations and marketed.

== Taxonomy and naming ==
The rainbow runner is the only species in the monotypic genus Elagatis, which is one of 30 genera in the jack family, the Carangidae. The Carangidae are perciform fishes in the suborder Percoidei. The species was first scientifically described in 1825 by French zoologists Jean René Constant Quoy and Joseph Paul Gaimard based on the type specimen collected from the Indian Ocean, somewhere in the Malay Archipelago. They named the species Seriola bipinnulata, believing the species was related to the amberjacks. This was later revised to the genus Seriolichthys by Bleeker before the species was found to warrant a new genus. The genus Micropteryx was initially created, but was already in use in the Lepidoptera. In 1840, Frederick Debell Bennett created the genus Elagatis, taken from a name published in a whaling voyage memoir, which he used in combination with the specific name bipinnulatus, which was deemed to be incorrect, as the genus name is feminine and the original spelling of bipinnulata was reinstated. Phylogenetically, the species is most closely related to the amberjack genus, Seriola, being the most basal member identified of the carangid tribe Naucratini. This has been determined by the sequencing of the mitochondrial cytochrome b genome, as well as older morphological studies.

The species' wide range has led to a wide array of local common names, with the most common English name being rainbow runner in reference to its colouring. Other names frequently applied include rainbow yellowtail, Hawaiian salmon, salmon (incorrectly), Spanish jack, salmon del alto (Cuba), and over 20 other names in various languages.

== Distribution and habitat ==
The rainbow runner has a circumtropical distribution, inhabiting tropical and some subtropical waters worldwide. In the Western Atlantic, the species occurs from Massachusetts and Bermuda to northeastern Brazil, including the northern and southern Gulf of Mexico, the Bahamas, and the Greater and Lesser Antilles, extending east to at least the Azores. The species is widespread throughout the Pacific Ocean, but appears to be slightly less abundant in parts of the Indian Ocean, and rare or absent in the Persian Gulf. The species is an occasional visitor to the Mediterranean Sea, generally as a Lessepsian immigrant through the Suez Canal, but has not taken up permanent residence like other species. The species also inhabits the nearby Canary Islands, possibly entering the Mediterranean from the east, also.

The species is primarily pelagic, inhabiting the upper 164 m of the water column, sometimes close to land over rock and coral reef systems, as well as far offshore. The species occasionally comes quite close to shore, known to inhabits lagoons for short periods, and juveniles have even been reported in a Taiwanese estuary system. Rainbow runners, like other carangids such as yellowtail kingfish, are easily attracted to special fish-attracting devices (FADs), floating buoy-type structures. The species has been shown to occupy a water zone outside of the FADs up to 12 m deep and 10 m wide, treating them as if they were stationary objects.

== Description ==
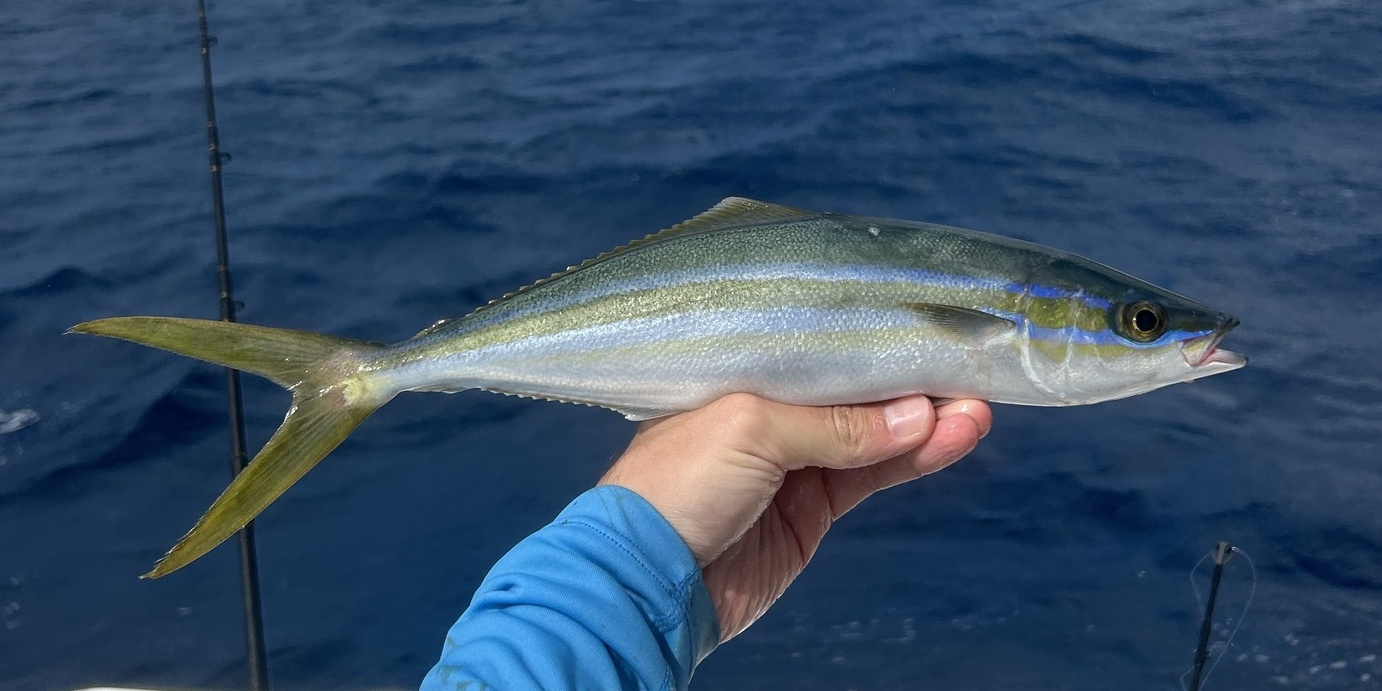
In Florida

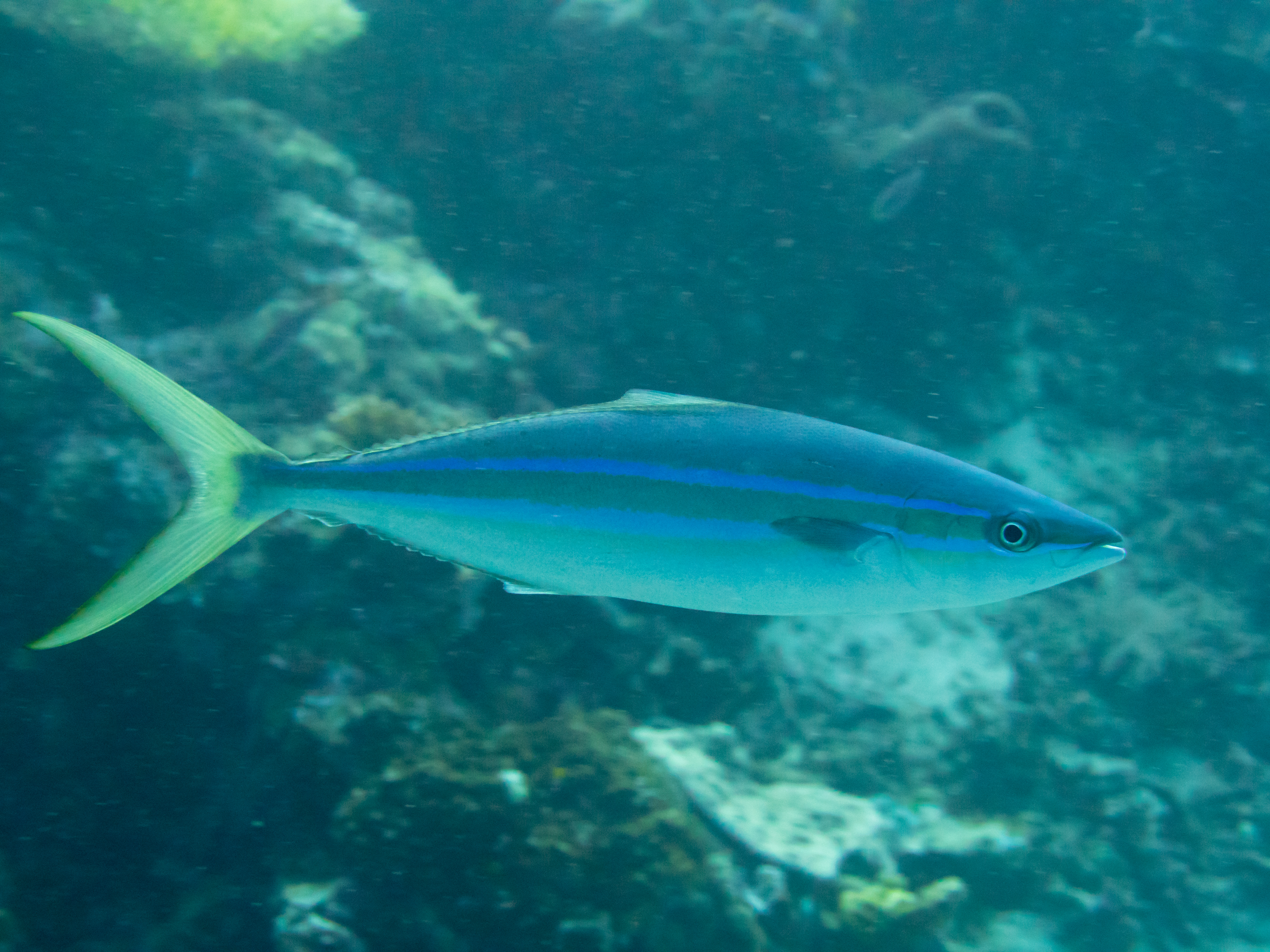
In Indonesia

The rainbow runner's body is atypical of the jack family, which generally have deep, compressed bodies. The rainbow runner has a subcylindrical, elongated to almost fusiform body, with a long, pointed head and snout and a tapering rear end before the caudal fin emerges. The eyes are relatively small and the teeth are arranged on jaws in villiform bands, with minute teeth also present on the roof of the mouth and tongue. The fish has two dorsal fins, although the posterior rays of the long second fin have separated into a finlet. The first dorsal consists of six spines, the second of a single spine and 25 to 30 soft rays, with the last two as a separate finlet. About 4% of rainbow runners have only five spines in the first dorsal fin, and are apparently born without them. The anal fin consists of one spine detached from the fin anteriorally, while the main fin has a single spine and 18 to 22 soft rays, with the last two detached to form a finlet like the dorsal fin. The dorsal and anal fins are quite low, and the dorsal fin is much longer than the anal. The pectoral fin is small for a carangid, about the length of the pelvic fin and is not falcate, with 20 rays. The pelvic fin consists of one spine and five branched soft rays. The caudal fin is also highly diagnostic, being deeply forked and consisting of 17 caudal rays, 9 dorsally and 8 ventrally. The lateral line has a slight anterior arch and no scutes are present on the line, but possesses about 100 scales. The scales covering the body and parts of the operculum, cheek, pectoral fins, pelvic fins, and caudal fins are ctenoid in shape. The species has 24 vertebrae.

The colour of the fish is possibly the easiest way to identify the rainbow runner, with the name taken from the species' striking colours. The upper body is a dark olive blue to green and fades to white underneath. Two narrow, light blue to bluish white stripes run longitudinally along the sides, with a broader olive to yellow stripe between them. The maximum length of the species is somewhat contentious, with most sources giving a known maximum length between 107 and 120 cm (42 and 47 in) cm, while one source asserts the species reaches 180 cm (71 in) in length. The maximum known weight is confidently known to be 46.2 kg, as recorded by the International Game Fish Association.

== Biology ==
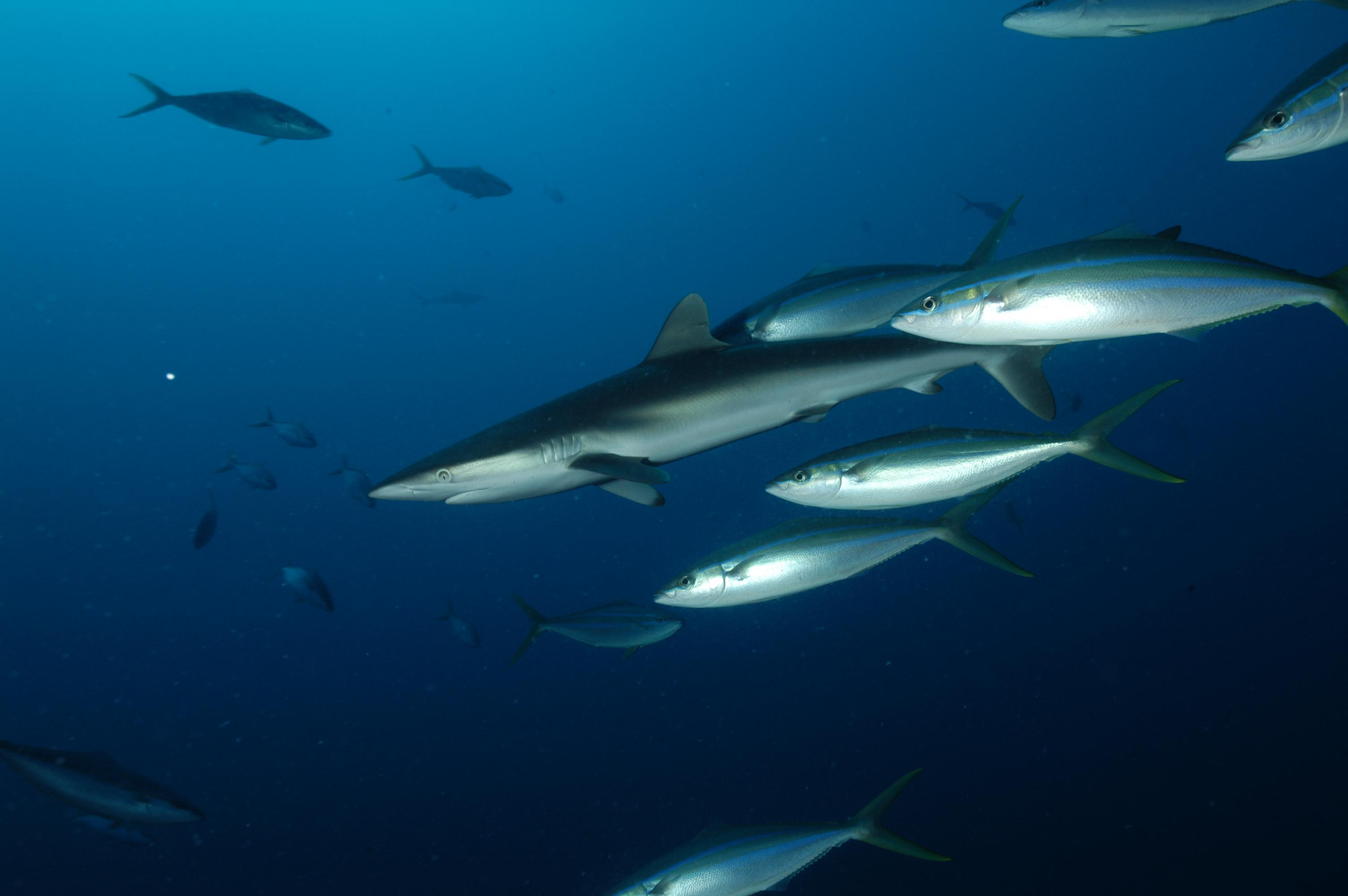
School accompanying a silky shark, in Seychelles

The species often forms schools of variable sizes ranging from a few individuals to several hundred. The species is also highly migratory, and biochemical studies on the species have shown that the muscles contain unusually high levels of the fatty acid docosahexaenoic acid, probably because the muscle is low in lipids due to their accumulation in other organs. Other migratory fishes such as tuna also have this adaptation, suggesting it is a convergent trait.

=== Diet ===
Rainbow runners are fast-swimming carnivores that take a wide range of prey, including a wide variety of small fishes, cephalopods, and pelagic or planktonic crustaceans, including, shrimp and crabs. The species shows selectivity of its prey, with fish in the Pacific Ocean taking higher numbers of Decapterus macarellus, a small fish, than any other prey available. Rainbow runners may increase their swimming and prey-searching abilities rapidly with their growth, becoming more efficient at finding their preferred prey items. Rainbow runners are also one of a number of pelagic fishes that prey on open-ocean species of sea-skaters (Halobates spp.), a type of insects which rest on the surface of the ocean. Rainbow runner themselves are important prey items for a number of larger species, with positively identified predators being Fraser's dolphin (Lagenodelphis hosei), and a number of seabirds of the family Laridae.

=== Reproduction ===
The size at sexual maturity is only confidently known for the female of the species, being around 600 mm in fork length, although the male has been estimated to reach maturity between 600 and 650 mm. In the Atlantic, the species is known to spawn from spring through to early autumn, although fish living in waters greater than 27 °C spawn year round. However, even when year-round spawning occurs, seasonal peaks are seen, with fish in the Western Pacific Ocean showing these peaks in May and in December–January. The fish is oviparous, producing pelagic eggs and larvae. The larval stages have been studied in detail, with the diagnostic features of the larvae include a supraoccupital crest and distinctive patterns of pigment and melanophores. The growth of the fish has also been studied, with the size of fish at 1, 2, 3, 4, and 5 years of age are estimated to be 30, 46, 59, 69, and 77 cm in length, respectively. The migration pattern of juveniles is poorly known, with only a migration from equatorial spawning grounds to the coasts of Japan recorded, often floating in the currents under large mats of Sargassum.

== Importance to humans ==
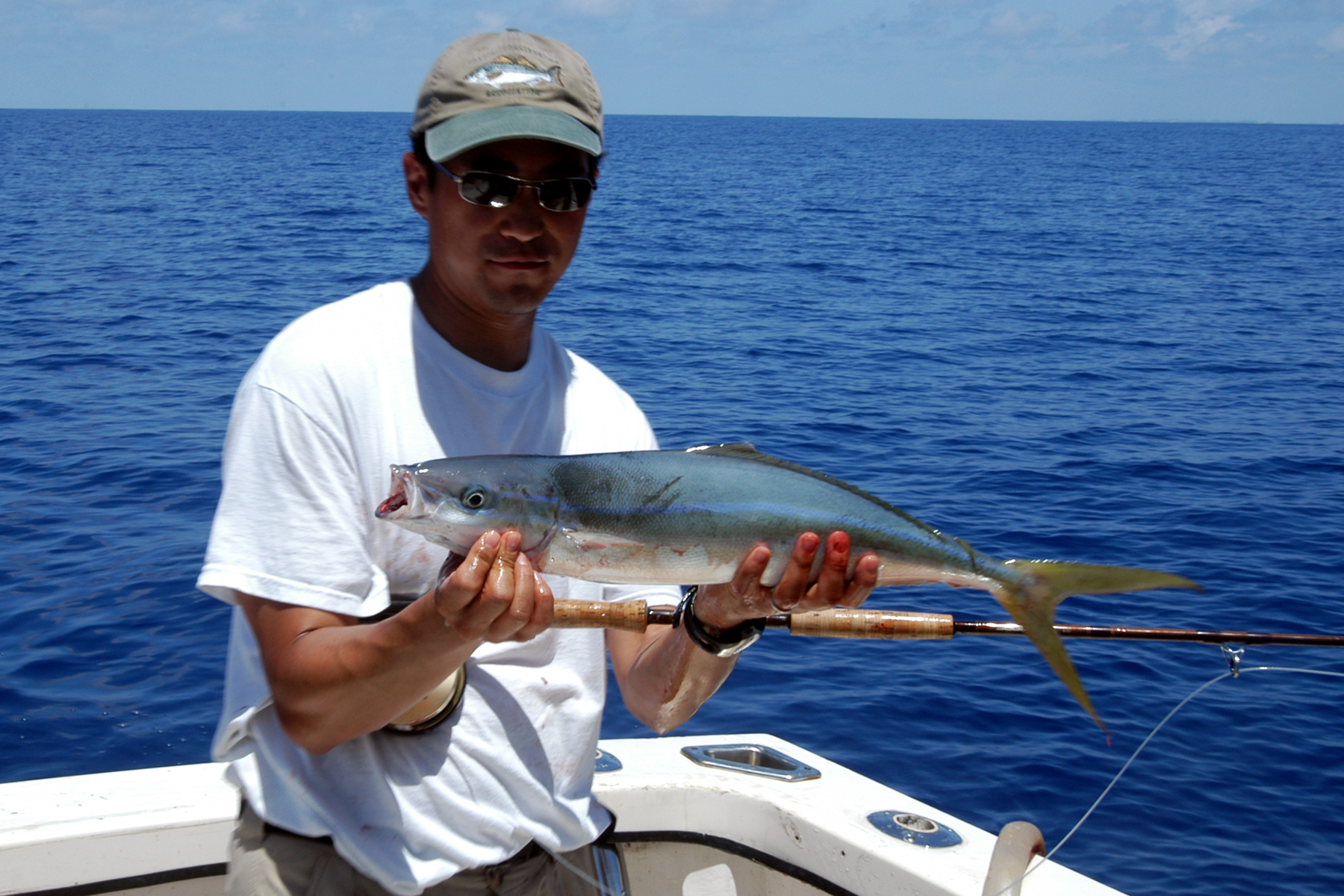
Rainbow runner taken on a saltwater fly, Bermuda

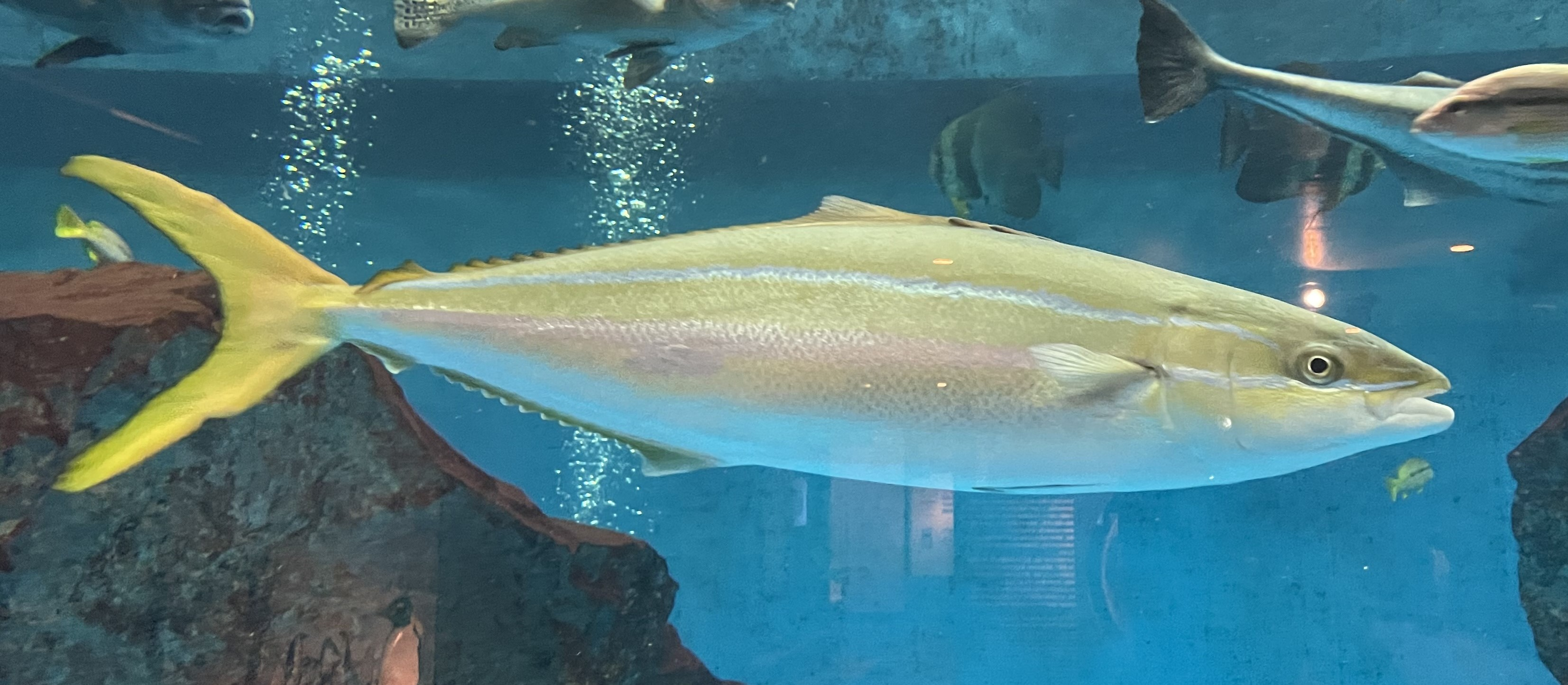
In captivity

Rainbow runners are not a major commercial species like tuna or herring, but are taken in large quantities as bycatch. Their flesh is said to be of fair to excellent standard, depending on personal preferences, but generally fetch a low price at markets because they are relatively unknown. Archaeological evidence from the Kapingamarangi and Nukuoro Atolls in the Caroline Islands of Micronesia suggests the prehistoric people of these islands caught large numbers of rainbow runner as food, thought to have been captured by 'trolling' lure hooks from canoes.

=== Commercial fishery ===
The rainbow runner is rarely targeted as a commercial fish, but many of the species often turn up as bycatch from tuna and shark fisheries, with the bycatch from the West Indian Tuna Fishery alone totaling 720–1877 t between 1985 and 1994. In recent years, this figure has increased, with global catches as estimated by the FAO peaking at 18,940 t per year in 1998 before declining to around 15,000 t per year in 2000/01. This bycatch is nearly always kept and sold at market, either fresh, salted, or frozen. The methods used to take most rainbow runner are purse seines, as well as hook and line techniques and other native fishing methods. At least one case of ciguatera poisoning has been reported from this species on the Virgin Islands.

=== Recreational fishery ===
A minor recreational fishery exists for rainbow runner in parts of the world. Often, they are taken while trolling for other species such as tuna and mackerel, but are often targeted inshore by anglers on the west coast of the Americas using surface popper-style lures. The fish are caught on a wide variety of lures and baits, with deep-diving lures, surface lures, and even saltwater flies used to good measure. The species takes a wide variety of baits, including live and cut fish, squid, octopus, and probably other crustaceans resembling their natural food. They are renowned as gamefish, especially at larger sizes. The species is also commonly used as bait, either as live bait or dead bait rigged to be trolled behind game boats for larger species such as billfish and tuna.
