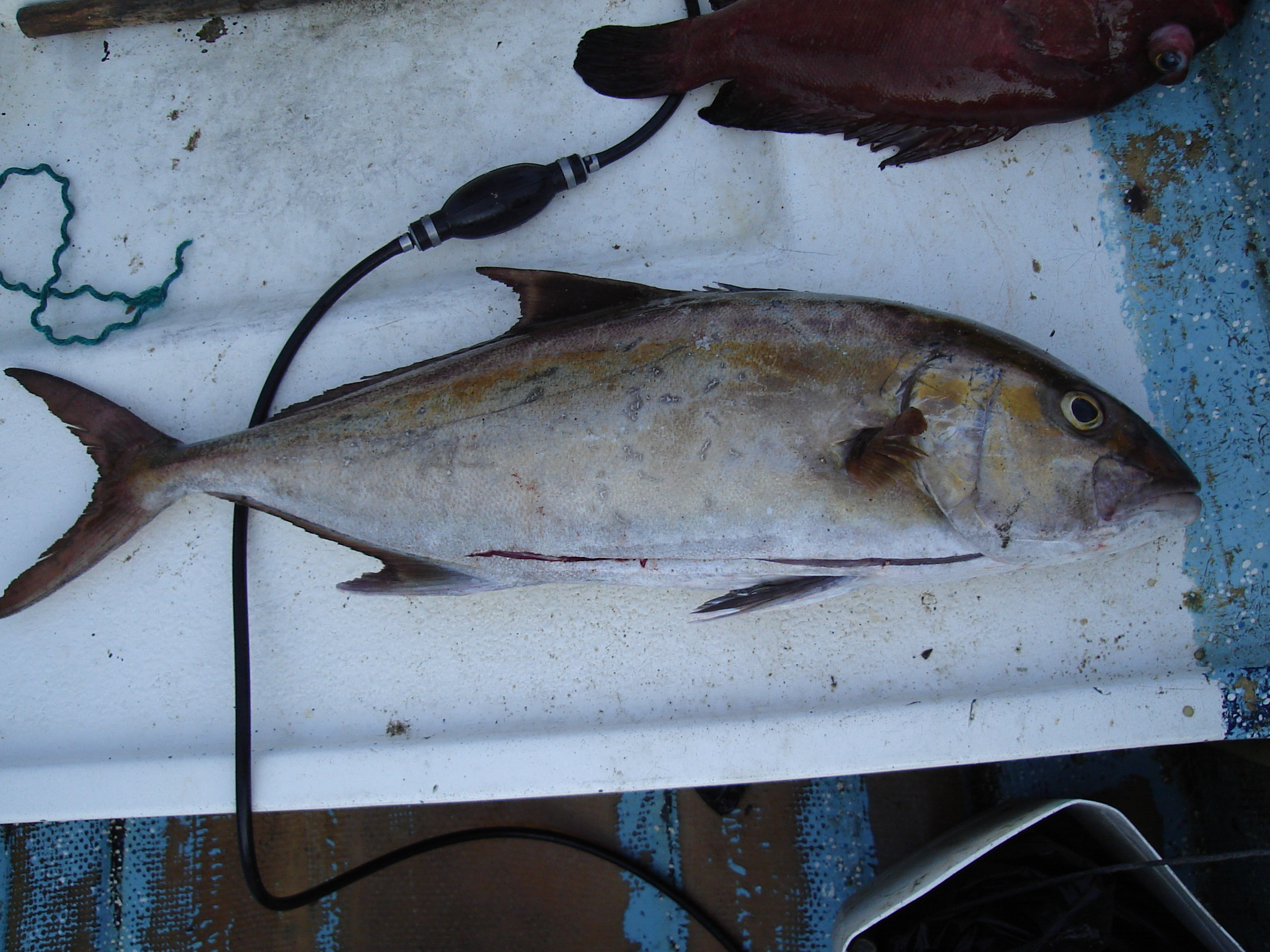

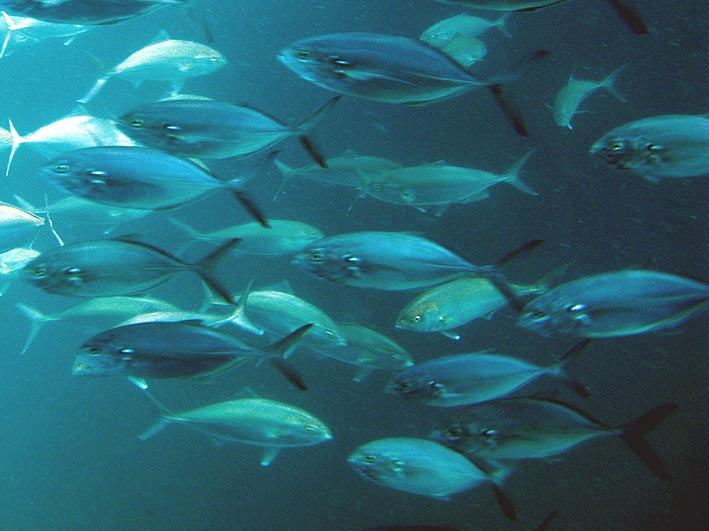

Conservation status
- Least Concern (IUCN 3.1)

Scientific classification
- Kingdom: Animalia
- Phylum: Chordata
- Class: Actinopterygii
- Order: Carangiformes
- Suborder: Carangoidei
- Family: Carangidae
- Genus: Seriola
- Species: S. peruana

Binomial name
- Seriola peruana Steindachner, 1881

= Fortune jack =

Species of ray-finned fish

The fortune jack (Seriola peruana), also known as the darkfin amberjack, is a species of ray-finned fish from the family Carangidae. It is found in the eastern Pacific from Mexico to Ecuador and on the Galapagos Islands. It is a benthopelagic and demersal fish of coastal areas, including areas of rocky reefs to 30 metres (98 ft). This species was formally described by the Austrian ichthyologist Franz Steindachner (1834-1919) in 1881 with the type locality given as Callao in Peru.
