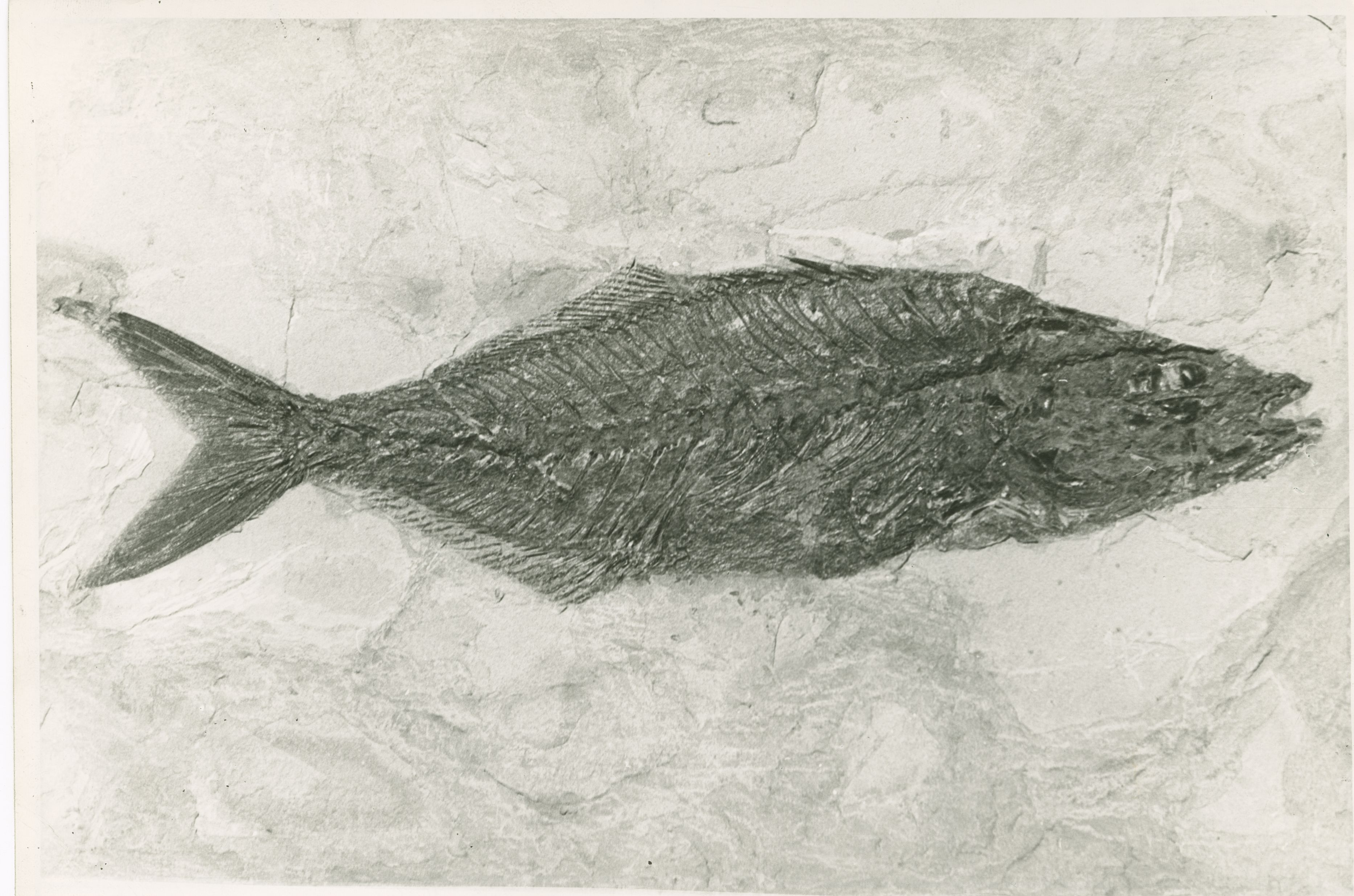
- Fossil specimen, Natural History Museum of Verona

Scientific classification
- Domain: Eukaryota
- Kingdom: Animalia
- Phylum: Chordata
- Class: Actinopterygii
- Order: Carangiformes
- Suborder: Carangoidei
- Family: Carangidae
- Genus: Seriola
- Species: †S. prisca

Binomial name
- †Seriola prisca (Agassiz, 1834)

Synonyms
- †Lichia prisca Agassiz, 1834; †Carangopsis analis Agassiz, 1844; †Seriola lata Heckel, 1854

= Seriola prisca =

Seriola prisca Temporal range: Early Eocene

Species of fish

Seriola prisca (prisca being Latin for "ancient") is an extinct species of prehistoric marine ray-finned fish from the Eocene. Complete fossil specimens are known from the famous Early Eocene-aged Monte Bolca site of Italy.

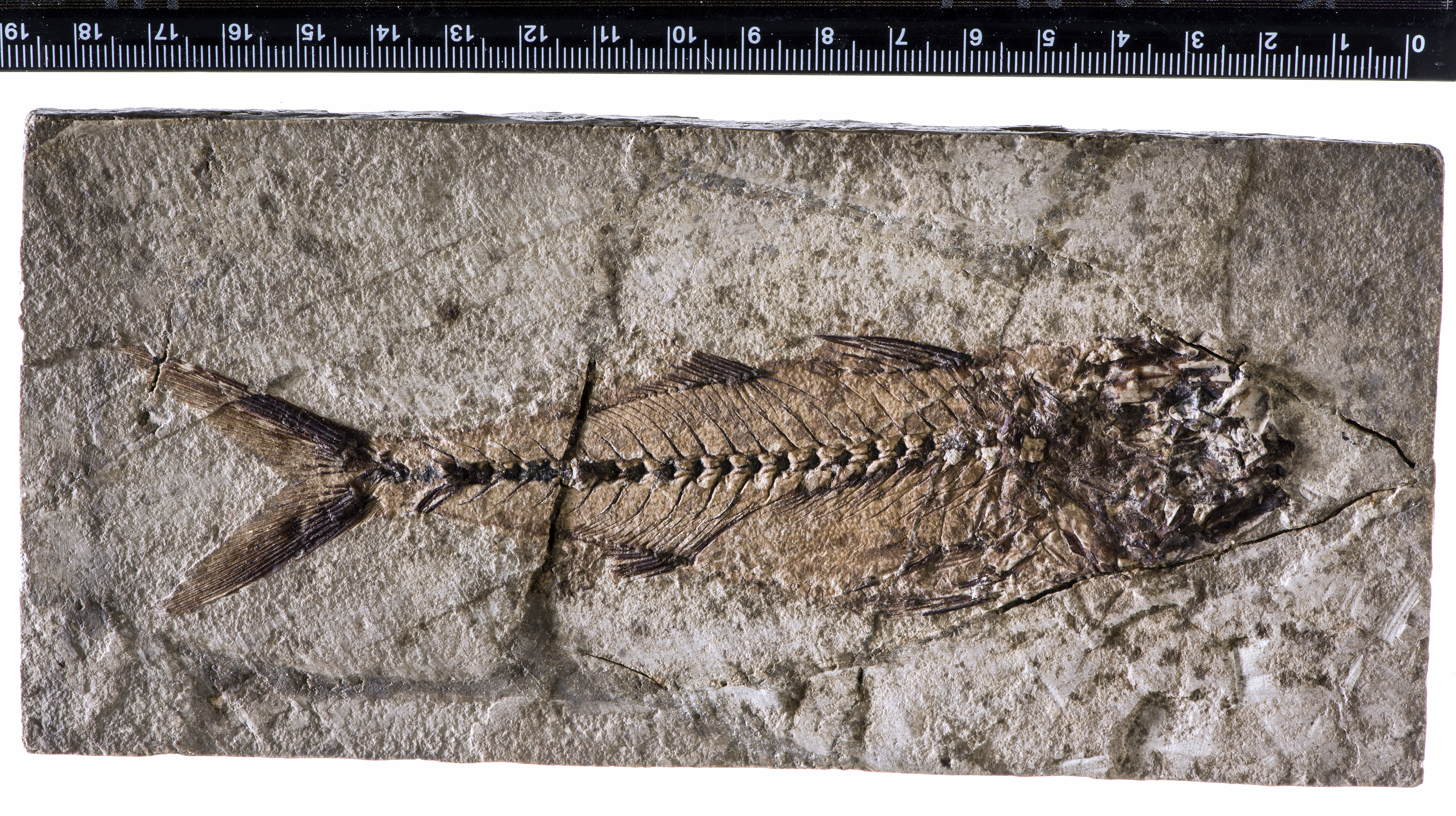
Specimen of a juvenile S. prisca

It was a close relative of modern amberjacks, belonging to the same genus as them (Seriola), and is one of the oldest known members of the genus. Due to its age and it belonging to an extant genus, it has often been used to provide a minimum age constraint for divergence of the carangid radiation. It closely resembles and may be related to the extinct species S. natgeosoc from the Bartonian of North Caucasus, Russia.

It was first erroneously identified in 1796 by Giovanni Serafino Volta as a fossil specimen of the extant "Scomber pelagicus" (now synonymized with the modern mahi-mahi). In 1834, it was described by Louis Agassiz as Lichia prisca, who considered it an extinct relative of the modern leerfish. It was moved to Seriola by Johann Jakob Heckel in 1854.

It could reach a length of 0.4 metres (1.3 ft).
