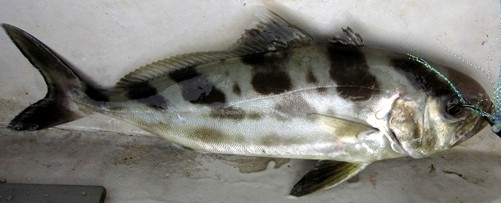

Conservation status
- Least Concern (IUCN 3.1)

Scientific classification
- Kingdom: Animalia
- Phylum: Chordata
- Class: Actinopterygii
- Order: Carangiformes
- Suborder: Carangoidei
- Family: Carangidae
- Subfamily: Naucratinae
- Genus: Seriolina; Wakiya, 1924
- Species: S. nigrofasciata

Binomial name
- Seriolina nigrofasciata (Rüppell, 1829)

Synonyms
- Nomeus nigrofasciatus Rüppell, 1829; Seriola nigrofasciata (Rüppell, 1829); Zonichthys nigrofasciata (Rüppell, 1829); Seriola intermedia Temminck & Schlegel, 1845

= Black-banded trevally =

Species of fish

The black-banded trevally (Seriolina nigrofasciata) is a species of carangid native to the Indian Ocean, the western Pacific Ocean, and the Atlantic coast of southeastern South Africa. This species inhabits reefs and rocky bottoms at depths from 20 to 150 m (66 to 492 ft). This species grows to 70 cm (28 in) in total length, and the maximum recorded weight reached is 5.2 kg (11 lb). It is of minor importance to local commercial fisheries, but is popular as a gamefish. This species is the only known member of its genus.

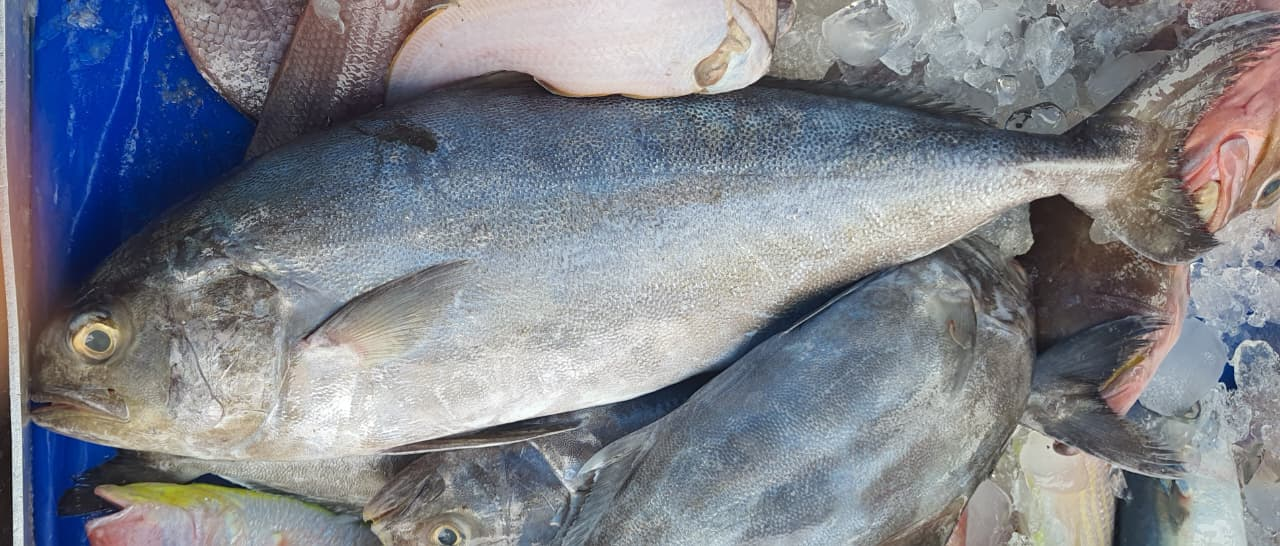
Seriolina nigrofasciata from Mangaluru, Karnataka, India
