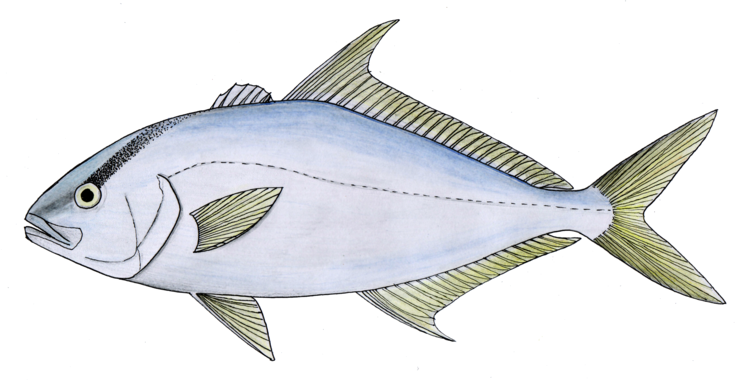

Conservation status
- Least Concern (IUCN 3.1)

Scientific classification
- Kingdom: Animalia
- Phylum: Chordata
- Class: Actinopterygii
- Order: Carangiformes
- Suborder: Carangoidei
- Family: Carangidae
- Genus: Seriola
- Species: S. rivoliana

Binomial name
- Seriola rivoliana Valenciennes, 1833

Synonyms
- Seriola bonariensis (Valenciennes, 1833); Seriola falcata Valenciennes, 1833; Seriola bovinoculata (J. L. B. Smith, 1959); Seriola songoro Smith, 1959; Seriola colburni (Evermann & Clark, 1928); Seriola coronata (Poey, 1860); Seriola declivis (Poey, 1860); Seriola ligulata Poey, 1860; Seriola proxima Poey, 1860; Seriola dubia (Lowe, 1839)

= Longfin yellowtail =

Species of fish

The longfin yellowtail (Seriola rivoliana), also known as the almaco or silvercoat jack, deep-water, falcate, European or highfin amberjack, rock salmon, longfin or yellow kingfish, is a game fish of the family Carangidae; they are in the same family as yellowtail and amberjack. They are carnivorous and feed, both day and night, on other, smaller fish, such as baitfish, small squid, octopus, crab and shrimp. The flesh is thick and dense, like tuna, and easily may be passed off for white albacore if prepared as sushi.

== Taxonomy ==
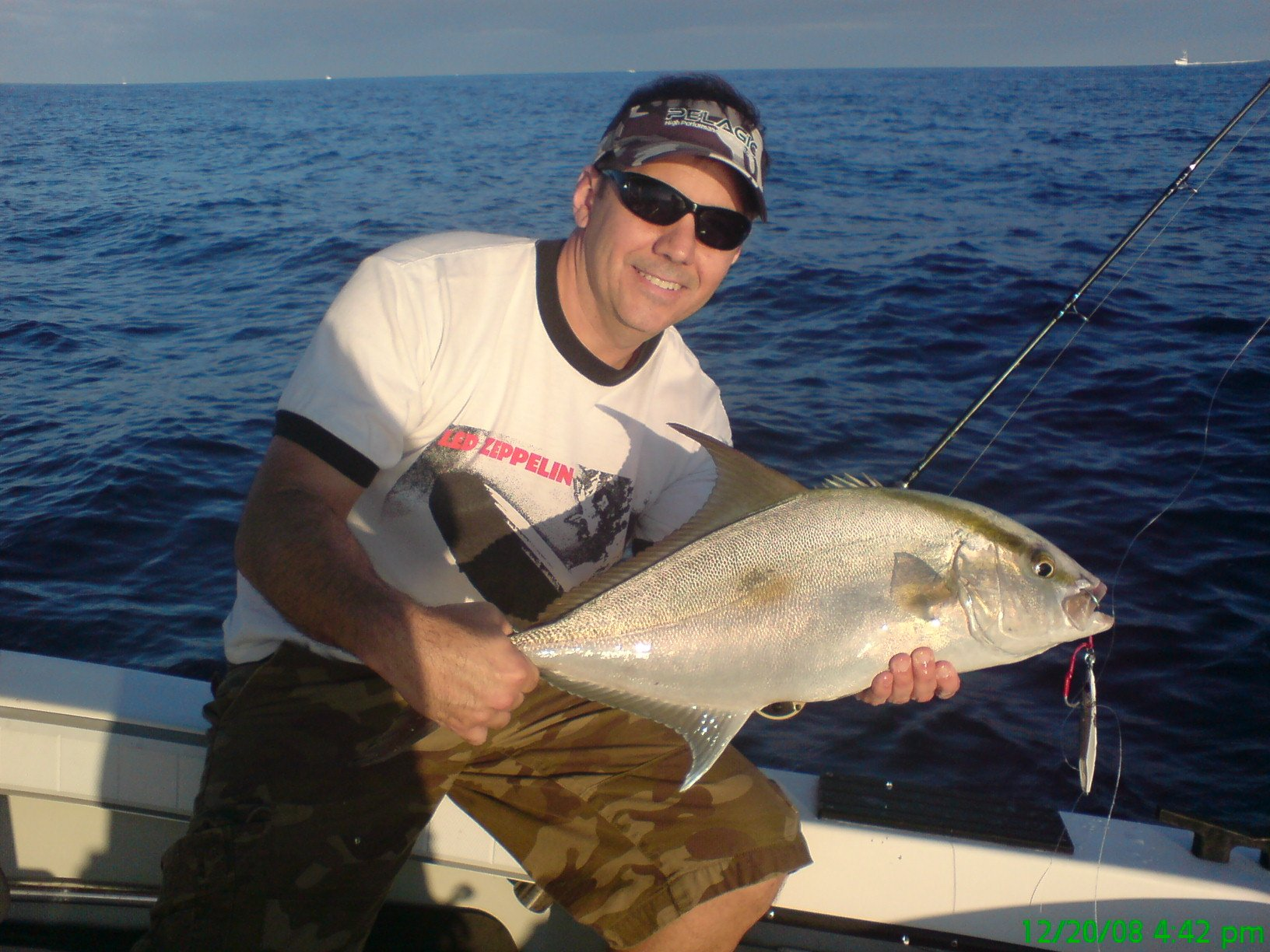
An Almaco jack caught by a recreational fisher

Achille Valenciennes, and Georges Cuvier published the first description of this species in 1833, although Cuvier died in 1832. Valenciennes and Cuvier together described many fish species most notably in the volume 22-volume Histoire naturelle des poissons (Natural History of Fish).

== Description ==
The longfin yellowtail has a less elongated, more flattened body than most jack species. Their dorsal fin and anal fins are elongated, and their outer edges have a definite sickle shape. The first rays of the almaco dorsal fin's longest parts are nearly twice as long as the dorsal spines, also different from other jacks.

They reach a typical length of 90 centimetres (35 in), sometimes reaching 160 centimetres (63 in) and 59.9 kilograms (132 lb). Typical catch is approximately ten pounds, however, according to the Florida Fish and Wildlife Conservation Commission, which describes it as wide-ranging in small groups and not a common catch.

Generally, longfin yellowtails are dusky-colored with faint amber or olive stripes down their sides. Their upper bodies and lower fins usually are dark brown or dark blue-green. The belly is much lighter and appears brassy or lavender. The nuchal bar and most of the fins are dark on adults. Exceptions are the pelvic fins which are white on the ventral sides.

== Distribution and habitat ==
The longfin yellowtail is a pelagic species, which are found in open-ocean zones in the vast deep waters beyond the continental shelf. This species may be found in small groups on slopes and off reefs at depths from 5 to 160 m. They visit wrecks more often than most other jacks do. In the Indian to the west Pacific oceans, almaco jack live from Kenya to South Africa and have been spotted off Mariana Islands, Wake Island, Ryukyu Islands, Kermadec Islands, and New Caledonia. In the eastern Pacific, almaco jack live from California to Peru and the Galápagos Islands. In the western Atlantic, they live mostly from Cape Cod to northern Argentina, although they are rare off North and South Carolina. In the Northeast Atlantic it is known from the Azores , Madeira, and mainland Portugal, though it has also been reported in southern England and in the Gulf of Biscay. Recorded first in 2000 in the Mediterranean Sea, near Lampedusa islands (Italy), more recent but sparse records are reported from the Balearic Islands to the Gulf of Gabès.-

They typically swim at depths ranging from 5–35 metres (16–115 ft).

== Behavior ==
The unusual stamina of the longfin yellowtail makes them a prime target for sport fishing in deep waters.

Almaco jack are subject to skin-based parasites. They remove them by rubbing against the rough skin of passing sharks. They are known to rub against passing scuba divers also, because they mistake them for sharks.

These fish spawn as often as weekly throughout the year.

== Aquaculture ==
Longfin yellowtails are farmed/ranched in deep water near the Island of Hawaii under the brand name Hawaiian Kampachi; and in La Paz, Baja California Sur, Mexico under the brand name: Baja Kampachi, as a domesticated alternative to wild tuna. Global production reached 1,000,000 pounds (450,000 kg) in 2008.

Almaco jack are abundant in the wild and never have been harvested commercially on large scale. In 2019, federal permit applications were filed to the United States Environmental Protection Agency and US Army Corps of Engineers to conduct a pilot study funded by Florida Sea Grant (using this species) 45 miles into the Gulf of Mexico southwest of Sarasota Florida. Florida Sea Grant hosted a public workshop in June 2019 to introduce the project to the public. The draft National Pollution Discharge Elimination System permit application was posted for public comment by the EPA. The number of public comments received triggered a public hearing on January 28, 2020, at Mote Marine Laboratory in Sarasota, and ultimately generated 43,000 public comments. The agencies were expected to post final permits in late summer 2020.

Eating almaco jack may cause a disease in humans called ciguatera, through bioaccumulation of ciguatoxin produced by a microscopic organism called dinoflagellate. However, farmed almaco jack on a controlled diet are free of these dinoflagellates and therefore, do not transmit ciguatera when eaten.

These fish have among the best reported feed-conversion ratios ever achieved. With no selective breeding at all, the amount of consumed pelleted feed required to produce one pound of almaco jack ranges from 1.6:1–2:1 pounds of feed to final live weight pound of fish. The resulting meat has a fat content of around 30%.

A Hawaiian fish farm grows longfin yellowtail, branded Kona Kampachi, in ring- or diamond-shaped net pens moored to the sea bottom 800 feet (240 m) below.

== As food ==
The flesh of the longfin yellowtail is quite delicious and may be prepared in a myriad of dishes, from completely raw (e.g. sushi, sashimi, crudo, etc.) to fully cooked (e.g. grilled, steamed, baked, etc.).
