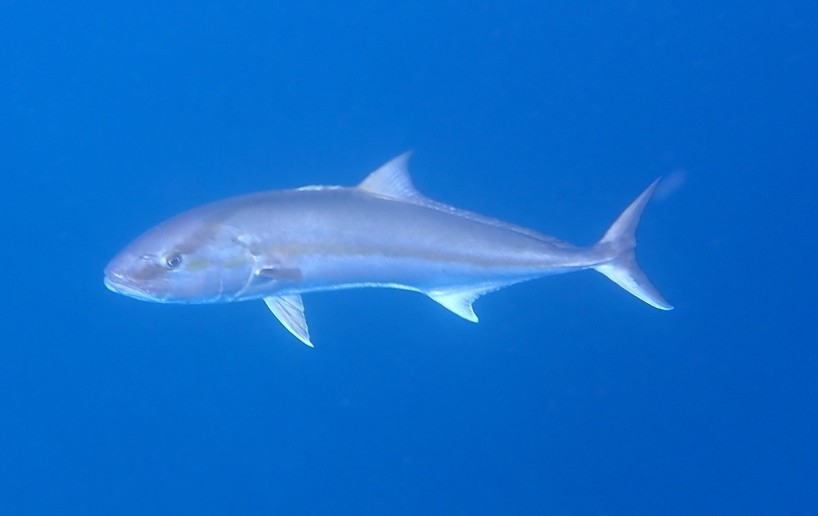

Conservation status
- Least Concern (IUCN 3.1)

Scientific classification
- Kingdom: Animalia
- Phylum: Chordata
- Class: Actinopterygii
- Division: Teleostei
- Order: Carangiformes
- Suborder: Carangoidei
- Family: Carangidae
- Genus: Seriola
- Species: S. carpenteri

Binomial name
- Seriola carpenteri F. J. Mather, 1971

= Seriola carpenteri =

Guinean amberjack

Species of ray-finned fish

Seriola carpenteri is a species of ray-finned fish commonly known as the Guinean amberjack (French: Sériole guinéenne, Spanish: Medregal de Guinea), which feeds on squids and fishes. It attains a size of at least 48 cm (18.9 in) fork length, and probably attains a much larger size. Adults are pelagic or epibenthic. Generally confined to areas where surface temperatures exceed 25 °C, the species is found in coastal waters over continental shelf from the surface to at least 200 m (656.2 ft) deep.

It is found in the eastern Atlantic from the Bay of Biscay to Angola, including Cape Verde. Its distribution may be influenced by seasonal movements of the 18–27 °C water mass along the African coast. Since 2000 it has been recorded on few occasions in the Sicily Channel, central Mediterranean Sea.

The species is named for William K. Carpenter of Fort Lauderdale, Florida. Carpenter, a game fisherman, has long been President and leading sponsor of the International Game Fish Association. His support of marine science includes financial contributions and participation in research.
