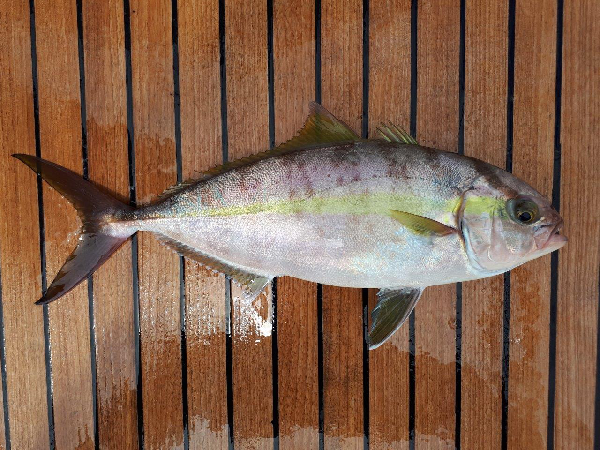

Conservation status
- Least Concern (IUCN 3.1)

Scientific classification
- Kingdom: Animalia
- Phylum: Chordata
- Class: Actinopterygii
- Order: Carangiformes
- Suborder: Carangoidei
- Family: Carangidae
- Genus: Seriola
- Species: S. fasciata

Binomial name
- Seriola fasciata (Bloch, 1793)

Synonyms
- Scomber fasciatus Bloch, 1793; Seriola semicoronata Poey, 1860

= Lesser amberjack =

Species of fish

The lesser amberjack (Seriola fasciata), also known as the false amberjack or little amberjack, is a species of ray-finned fish from the family Carangidae, the jacks and pompanos.

It occurs in the Atlantic Ocean. In the western Atlantic it ranges from Massachusetts in the north along the eastern Coast of the United States and into the Gulf of Mexico as far south as Tamaulipas. In the Caribbean Sea it is found off Cuba and Barbados and from Santa Marta, Colombia to Isla la Tortuga, Venezuela. It is also found around Bermuda. In the eastern Atlantic its distribution reaches north to Spain to Ghana as well as being found around the Canary Islands, Azores, Madeira and St Helena. Reported for the first time in 1993 in the Western Mediterranean Sea, it has now expanded eastwards from Sicily to the Levant.

It is a benthopelagic, predatory species, the adults feed on smaller fish and cephalopods. The adults occur close to or on the bottom at depths of 55–130 metres (180–427 ft) while the larger juveniles are pelagic or benthic in the waters of the continental shelf and the smaller juveniles are found in oceanic or offshore waters.

The lesser amberjack has an olive green or brownish back with silver flanks. There is a dark stripe which runs from behind the eye to front of the first dorsal fin. Compared to the related greater amberjack, the lesser amberjack has a proportionately larger eye and a deeper body. The anal fin is around two-thirds the length of the second dorsal fin. The juveniles are marked with split or wavy transverse bars on their sides.
