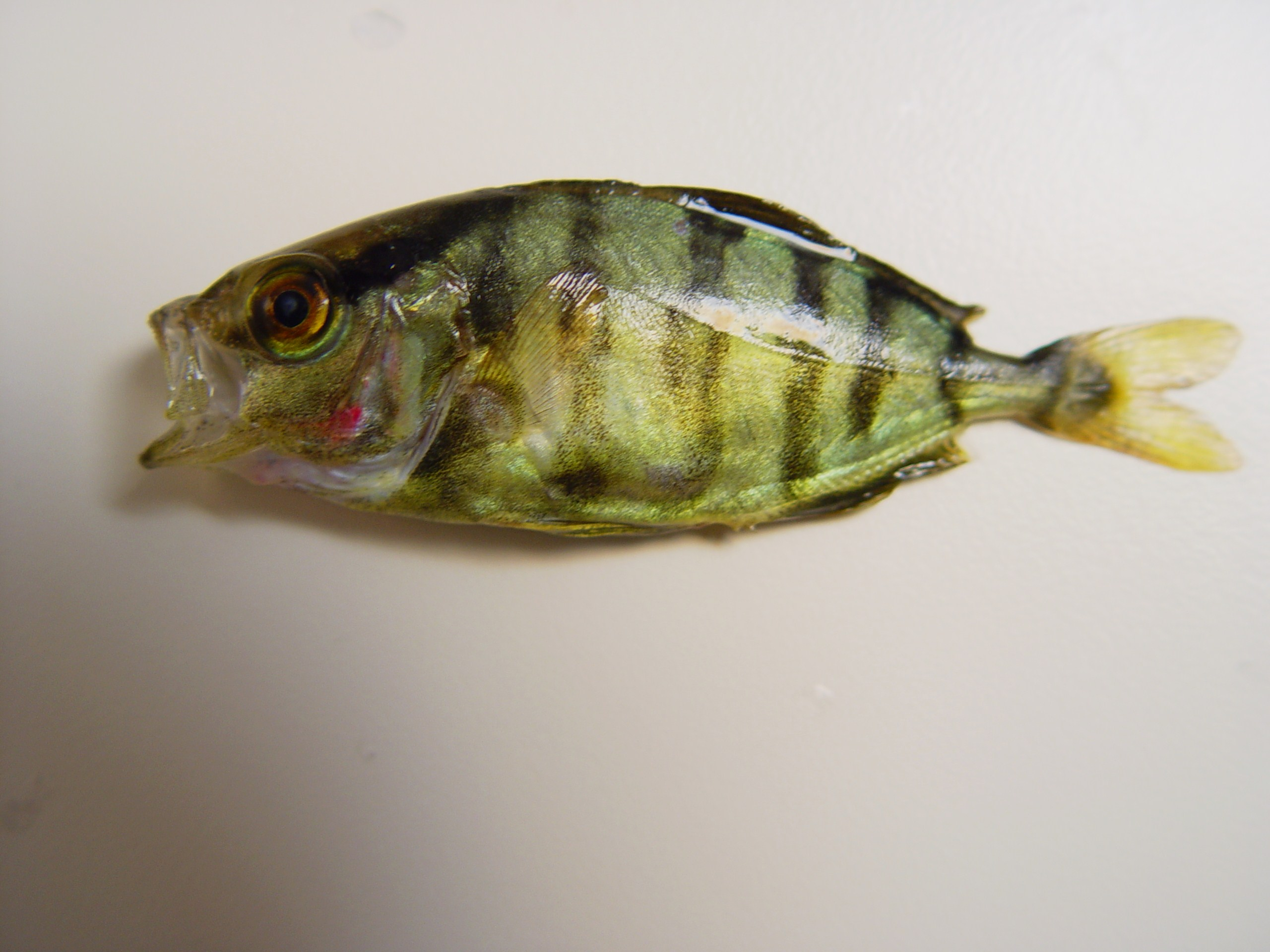

Conservation status
- Least Concern (IUCN 3.1)

Scientific classification
- Kingdom: Animalia
- Phylum: Chordata
- Class: Actinopterygii
- Division: Teleostei
- Order: Carangiformes
- Suborder: Carangoidei
- Family: Carangidae
- Genus: Seriola
- Species: S. zonata

Binomial name
- Seriola zonata (Mitchill, 1815)

Synonyms
- Scomber zonatus Mitchill, 1815

= Banded rudderfish =

Species of fish

The banded rudderfish (Seriola zonata), also known as the slender amberjack, banded mackerel, or shark pilot, is a species of ray-finned fish from the family Carangidae, the jacks and pompanos from the western Atlantic Ocean.

== Description ==
Banded rudderfish are bluish, greenish, or brown in colour as adults and do not have any dark vertical bars. The second dorsal fin is around twice the length of the anal fin. The dark lobes of the caudal fin have white tips. The juveniles have six transverse dark bars along their flanks and a dark stripe that runs from the eye to the first dorsal fin. The dorsal fin is dark, but an indistinct white margin is on the second dorsal fin, while the lobe and margin of the anal fin are white. It frequently has an amber stripe, which runs from the snout along the flank, and often another dark strip runs from the eye to in front of the first dorsal fin. It has an elongated, fusiform, compressed body with a long, pointed snout. This species can attain a length of 78 centimetres (31 in) and a weight of 5.2 kilograms (11 lb).

== Distribution ==
The banded rudderfish is a species of the western Atlantic Ocean, where it is found from Nova Scotia to Santos, São Paulo. Its presence in Cuba has yet to be confirmed.

== Habitat and biology ==
The banded rudderfish is a benthopelagic fish found at depths of 3–360 metres (9.8–1,181.1 ft). It is found over hard substrates in both inshore and offshore waters, but it normally inhabits shallower water than its congeners. The juveniles are found in association with floating mats of weed or debris and have been known to follow sharks and other large fishes. The juveniles have also been recorded in association with jellyfish. The adults feed on fish and crustaceans. Spawning takes place throughout the year in offshore waters.

== Species description ==
Seriola zonata was formally described in 1815 as Scomber zonatus by the American physician, naturalist, and politician Samuel L. Mitchill (1764–1831) with the type locality stated as New York Bay, New York.
