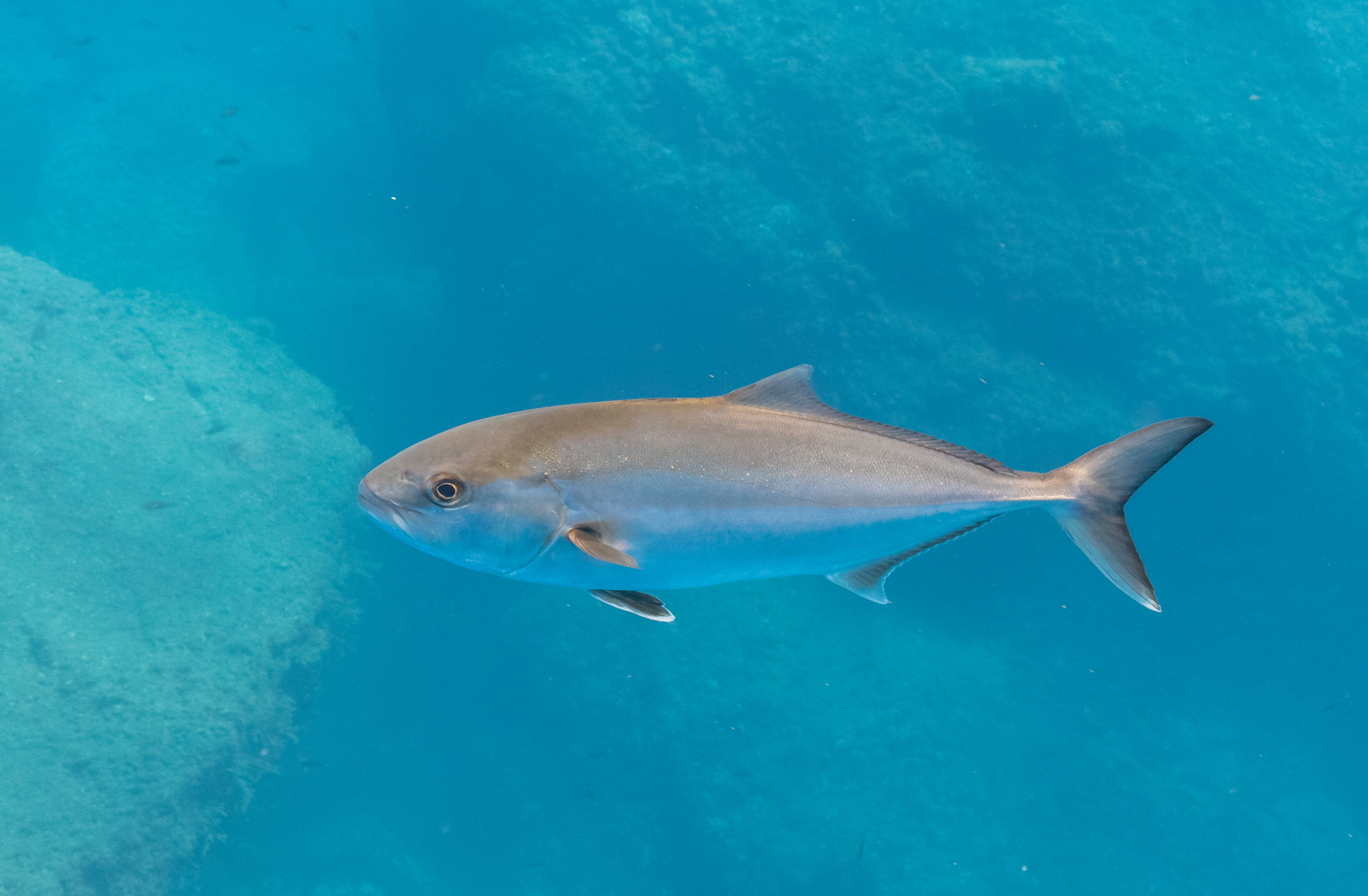

Conservation status
- Least Concern (IUCN 3.1)

Scientific classification
- Kingdom: Animalia
- Phylum: Chordata
- Class: Actinopterygii
- Division: Teleostei
- Order: Carangiformes
- Suborder: Carangoidei
- Family: Carangidae
- Genus: Seriola
- Species: S. dumerili

Binomial name
- Seriola dumerili (Risso, 1810)

Synonyms
- Caranx dumerili Risso, 1810; Trachurus aliciolus Rafinesque, 1810; Trachurus fasciatus Rafinesque, 1810; Seriola boscii Valenciennes, 1833; Seriola purpurascens Temminck & Schlegel, 1845; Seriola tapeinometopon Bleeker, 1853; Seriola gigas Poey, 1860; Seriola simplex Ramsay & Ogilby, 1886; Regificola parilis Whitley, 1948; Seriola rhombica J. L. B. Smith, 1959

= Greater amberjack =

Species of fish

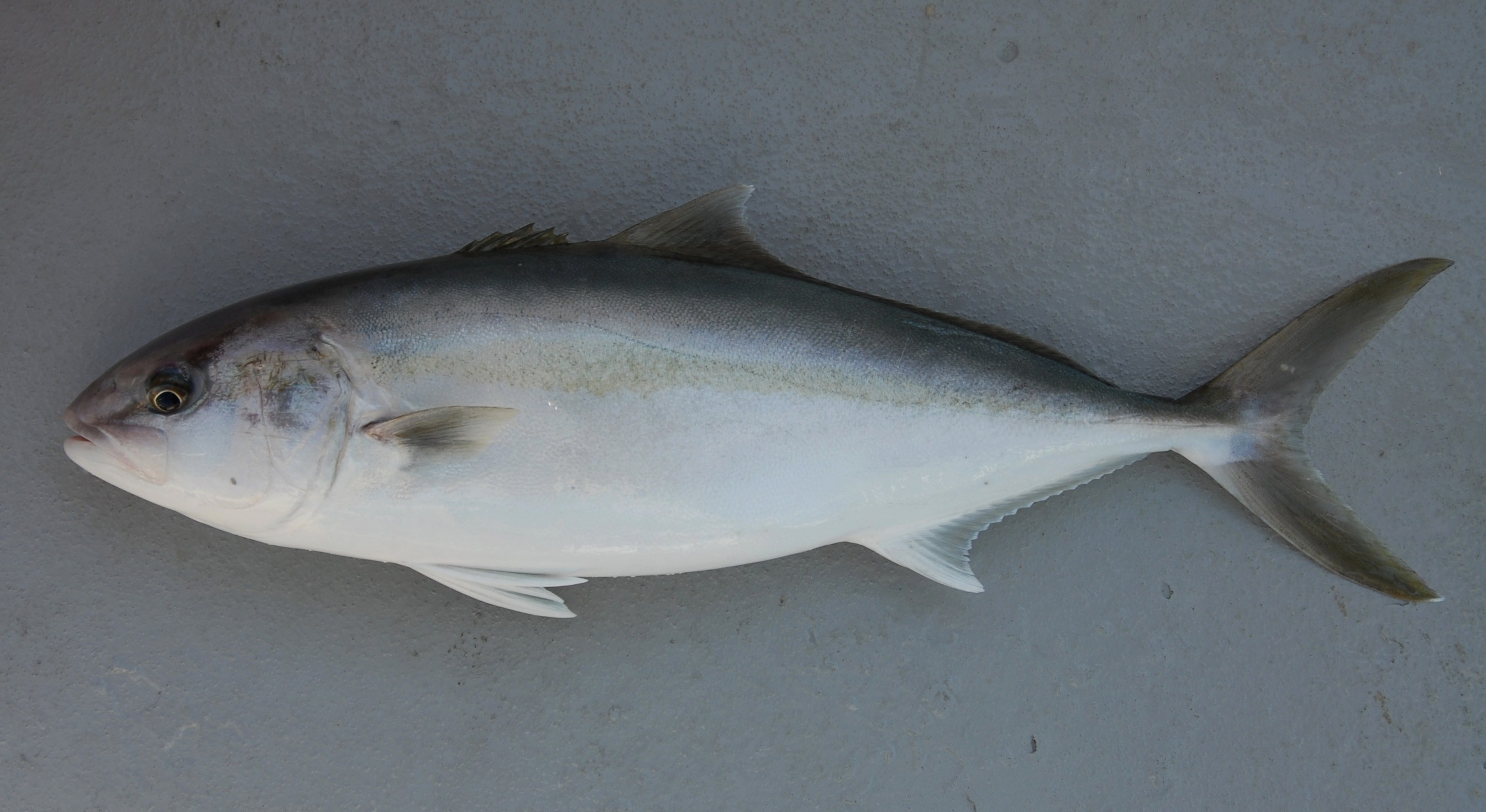
Greater Amberjack (Seriola dumerili). Gulf of Mexico. Credit: SEFSC Pascagoula Laboratory; Collection of Brandi Noble, NOAA/NMFS/SEFSC. Notice the elongated body, the short very streamlined dorsal and pelvic fins and the tuna-like tail.

The greater amberjack (Seriola dumerili), also known as the allied kingfish, great amberfish, greater yellowtail, jenny lind, sea donkey, purplish amberjack, reef donkey, rock salmon, sailors choice, yellowtail, and yellow trevally, is a species of predatory ray-finned fish in the family Carangidae, the jacks and pompanos. It is found in temperate, subtropical, and tropical seas around the world. It is a popular quarry species for recreational fisheries and is important in commercial fisheries. It is the largest species in the family Carangidae.

== Description ==
The greater amberjack is a large predatory fish which has a body colouring which varies from brownish to bluish-grey on the dorsal surfaces contrasting with the silvery-white underparts. A diagonal sooty stripe starts at the snout and runs along the centre of the back dorsal fin; another dark stripe runs from the upper jaw, across the eye to in front of the first dorsal fin. Some fish may show a light yellow to reddish-brown stripe along the flanks. The fins are dusky in colour. The second dorsal and anal fins have a low anterior lobe. Small juveniles have clear fins and a series of five vertical bands along the body and a sixth band on the caudal peduncle. The shape of the body is elongated and fusiform and it is of moderate depth and laterally compressed, and has a covering of small cycloid scales. The largest fish have been measured at 190 cm (75 in) in total length, but the more typical length found is 100 cm (39 in), while the largest published weight is 80.6 kg (178 lb).

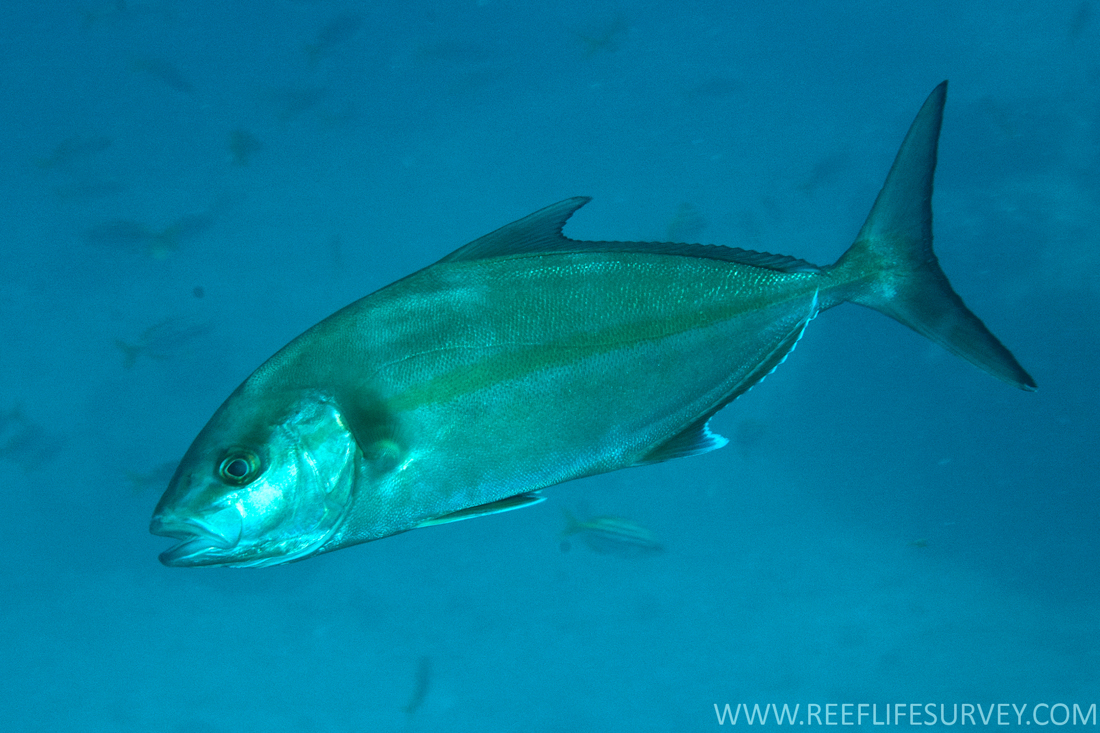
New South Wales

== Distribution ==
The greater amberjack has an almost circumglobal distribution in the world's subtropical and tropical seas and oceans. In the Indian Ocean, it is found along the African coast from South Africa east through the Persian Gulf to Western Australia and southern Japan, reaching the Hawaiian Islands and Micronesia in the Pacific Ocean. It reaches as far south as the island of Tasmania off the coast of Australia. In the western Atlantic Ocean, this species is found around Bermuda and on the North American coast as far north as Nova Scotia extending south as far as Brazil, including the Gulf of Mexico and the Caribbean Sea. In the eastern Atlantic Ocean, it has been recorded as a vagrant as far north as the British Isles and is found off in the Bay of Biscay south to Morocco and in the Mediterranean Sea. It may occur along the west African coast, but may be confused with the similar Seriola carpenteri.

== Habitat and biology ==
=== Habitat ===
The greater amberjack is found as solitary individuals or in small to moderate-sized schools, which are epibenthic and pelagic and occur in the vicinity of reefs, deep offshore caves, drop-offs, rocky outcrops, and deep seaward reefs. It sometimes enters coastal bays, while the juveniles are infrequently recorded quite far well out to sea where they shelter among floating algae, such as Sargassum, and debris. It can also be found over wrecks. Smaller individuals, less than 3 kg (6.6 lb), can be caught in shallow water, while the larger fish prefer deeper water, normally 18–72 m (59–236 ft) and have been recorded at depths of 360 m (1,180 ft).

=== Diet ===
Greater amberjacks are opportunistic predators when they are adults, which prey on benthic and pelagic fishes, as well as cephalopods and crustaceans. Common fish prey species include the bigeye scad (Selar crumenophthalmus) and sardines (Sardinella aurita and Sardina pilchardus). The juvenile fish feed on plankton, including the larvae of decapods and other small invertebrates. The juveniles switch to feeding on larger prey such as larger benthic and nektonic organisms when they attain a length of 8–12 cm (3.1–4.7 in), and once they have grown larger than 12 cm (4.7 in), they restrict their prey choice to animals that swim on or over the substrate; when they attain 20 cm (7.9 in), they are mainly piscivorous and at this size, they move from open waters to more coastal areas.

=== Breeding ===
S. dumerli is gonochoric, meaning that the males and females are separate and determined at birth, and no sexual dimorphism exists other than size. The sexes begin to differentiate around 4–5 months of age when they attain a length of 24–26 cm (9.4–10.2 in). In the Mediterranean, they reach sexual maturity at 4 (males) and 5 (females) years of age when they attain a length around 109 and 113 centimetres (43 and 44 in) in length in males and females. In western Atlantic populations, the males are mature after three years and 80 cm (31 in) and the females after four years of age and attaining 83 cm (33 in). This species has been observed to show pair courtship off Belize where schools numbering around 120 individuals were found and pairing mainly occurred during when the Moon was either full or waning and between February and October. Half of the males are sexually mature at 64.6 cm (25.4 in) fork length for males; half of the females are sexually mature on attaining 73.3 cm (28.9 in) fork length. This is a highly productive fish; a single female may lay 18 to 59 million eggs in a single spawning season. Off the coast of Florida, spawning peaks in April and May, each female is estimated to spawn once every four to five days during the spawning season, lasting around 60 days. In the Mediterranean, spawning takes place in June and July. Spawning occurs over such habitats as reefs and shipwrecks, demonstrated by the abundance of juveniles in these habitats in the summer following the spring spawning in the western Atlantic.

The eggs are 1.9 mm (0.075 in) in diameter, and after spawning, the embryos take around 40 hours to develop at 23 °C (73 °F), and the newly hatched 2.9-millimetre (0.11 in) larvae take 31–36 days to develop into juveniles. They can live up to 17 years.

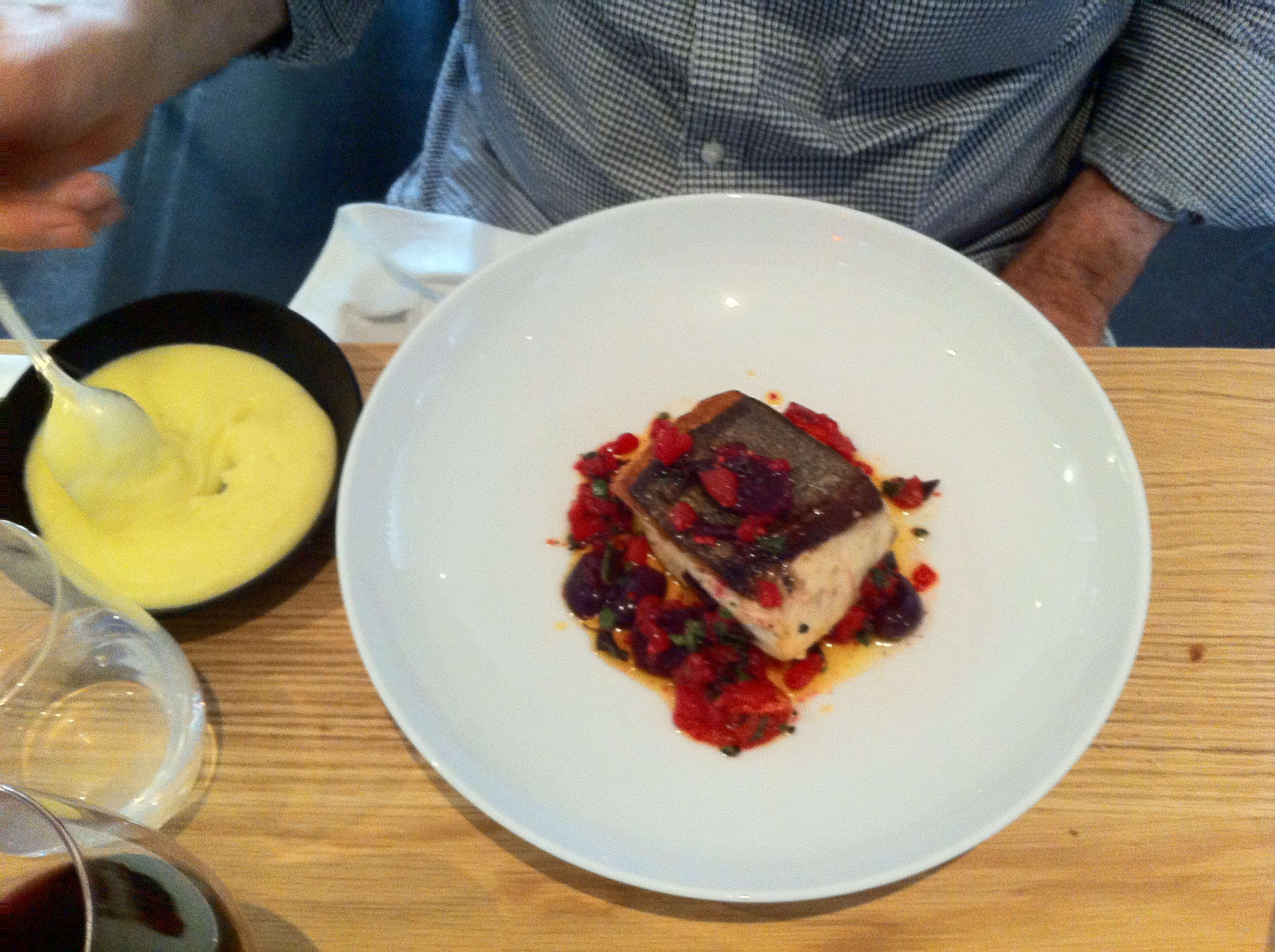
Greater amberjack baked with olive oil

=== Predators and parasites ===
Greater amberjack are preyed on by larger fishes including the yellowfin tuna (Thunnus albacares) and European hake (Merluccius merluccius), and seabirds including the brown noddy (Anous stolidus) and sooty tern (Sterna fuscata). Tapeworms are occasionally recorded as infesting this species, these worms being harmless to humans, albeit rather unappetising. The monogenean Zeuxapta seriolae has been documented as living as a parasite on the gills of these fish.

== Human usage ==
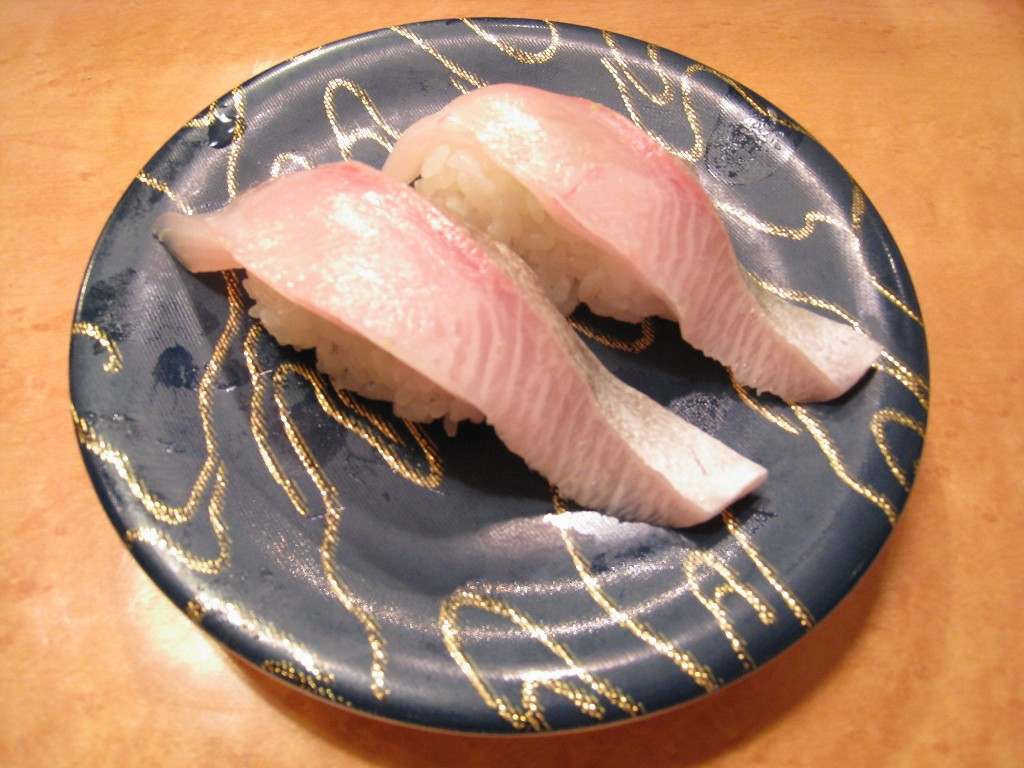
Greater amberjack is known as kanpachi in Japan, and eaten as sushi

The greater amberjack is an important food fish and is a commercial quarry species, and the species has been used in aquaculture in the Mediterranean since the 1980s. As a predatory fish, it requires protein and lipids sourced from other fish, so questions have arisen over the sustainability of its culture. It is also a popular game species for angling, having earned the nickname "reef donkey" for its stubborn fight. The meat is used for sushi and sashimi in Japan, while in Florida and Mexico, its flesh is marketed fresh and can be fried, broiled, baked, or grilled. Angling techniques used to catch greater amberjacks include trolling at the surface with various artificial lures and natural baits. They are often incidentally caught by anglers who are fishing the seabed for snappers and groupers.

== Taxonomy and etymology ==
The greater amberjack was formally described as Caranx dumerili by French naturalist Antoine Risso in 1810, with the type locality given as Nice, France. The binomial consists of the generic name, which is the Italian name for this species, while the specific name is patronymic, the identity of the person honoured in the patronym was not identified by Risso, but is almost certainly French zoologist André Marie Constant Duméril (1774–1860), who was the father of another well-known French zoologist Auguste Duméril (1812–1870). It is the type species of the genus Seriola.
