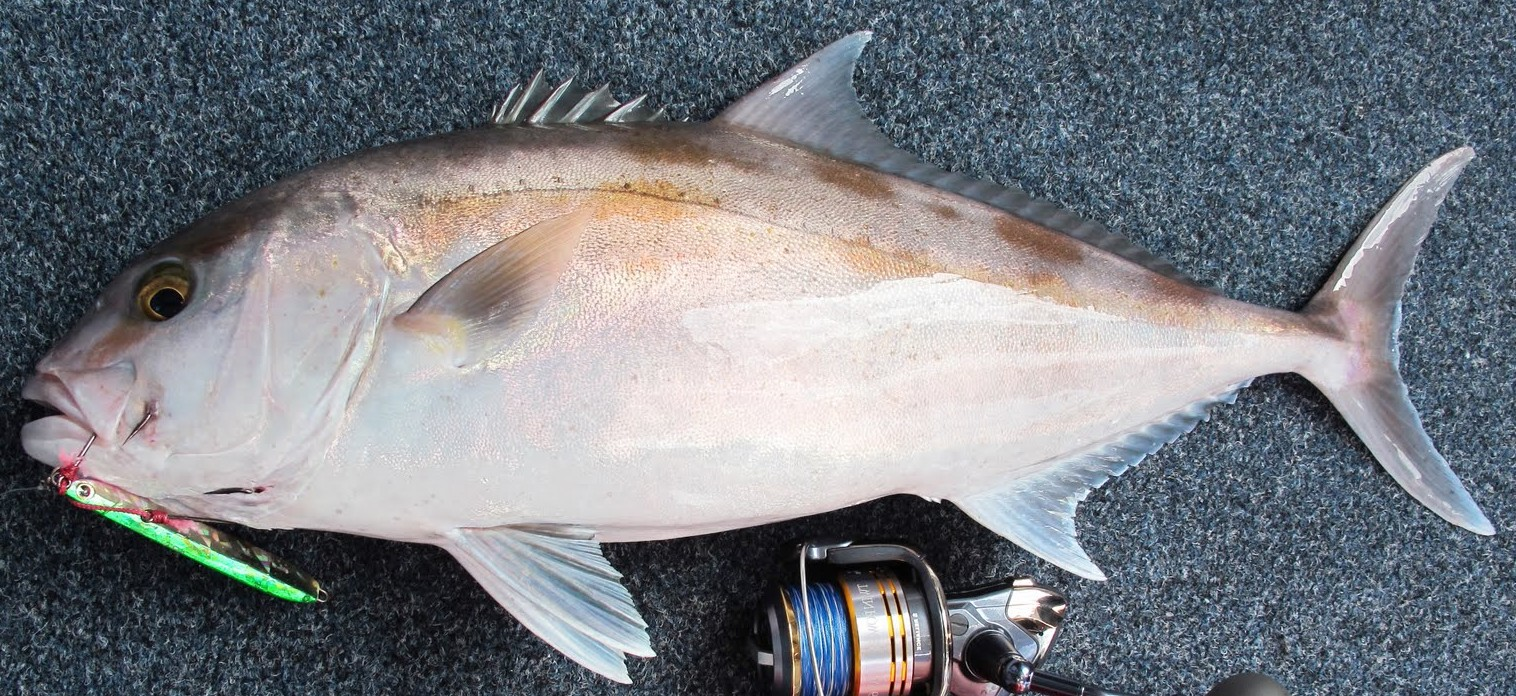

Conservation status
- Least Concern (IUCN 3.1)

Scientific classification
- Kingdom: Animalia
- Phylum: Chordata
- Class: Actinopterygii
- Order: Carangiformes
- Suborder: Carangoidei
- Family: Carangidae
- Genus: Seriola
- Species: S. hippos

Binomial name
- Seriola hippos Günther, 1876

Synonyms
- Seriola gigas Günther, 1860; Naucratopsis excusabilis McCulloch & Whitley, 1929-30

= Samson fish =

Species of ray-finned fish

The samson fish (Seriola hippos) is a jack of the genus Seriola. It is found in the Indo-Pacific Oceans to eastern Northland in New Zealand. Its length is between 80 and 150 cm.
