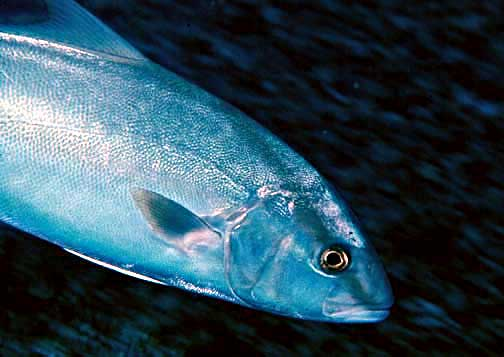
- Greater amberjack (S. dumerili)

Scientific classification
- Kingdom: Animalia
- Phylum: Chordata
- Class: Actinopterygii
- Division: Teleostei
- Order: Carangiformes
- Suborder: Carangoidei
- Family: Carangidae
- Subfamily: Naucratinae
- Genus: Seriola; G. Cuvier, 1816

Type species
- Caranx dumerili A. Risso, 1810

Synonyms
- Buphthalmus J.L.B Smith, 1959; Halatractus Gill, 1863; Micropteryx Agassiz, 1831; Naucratopsis Gill, 1863; Regificola Whitley, 1931; Zonichthys Swainson, 1839

= Seriola =

Seriola Temporal range: Early Eocene to present

Genus of fishes

Seriola is a genus of ray-finned fish, with many species commonly known as amberjacks. Nine extant species are currently recognized, although these were formerly split into many more. Also, several species are currently placed in several other genera of the Carangidae that were originally described under Seriola. They are a large, carnivorous finfish popularly known for the firm texture and rich flavour of their flesh, which make them an ideal fish for aquaculture. Because specimens caught can weigh up to 100 kg (220 lb), and are powerful swimmers and hunters, they are also highly prized by sport fisherman.

Most Seriola species are either benthic, demersal, or pelagic, and can be found down to 200 m. All 9 species cover most of the globe in terms of distribution, usually in coastal waters. Most are shown to be pelagic spawners, releasing eggs into the open ocean habitat until hatching, and they do this through dioecious, external reproduction. Most Seriola species are found in schools, and have diets consisting of fish, squid, and other invertebrates.

The genus name Seriola is from the Italian for the Mediterranean populations of the type species of the genus, the greater amberjack.

Though most of the Seriola species are considered "amberjacks", the species Seriola hippos (samson fish) is not.

== Aquaculture ==
More than 150,000 tonnes of Seriola are produced through aquaculture per year. The majority is produced in Japan and Korea (Seriola quinqueradiata, Seriola dumerili, and Seriola lalandi), with smaller contributions from New Zealand/Australia (Seriola lalandi) and America (Seriola rivoliana). Japanese yellowtail (Seriola quinqueradiata) accounts for more than 80% of global annual production. These cultured species are increasingly used in raw sushi, where they are known as hamachi, buri, kampachi, and hiramasa.

Several trials are underway for land-based Seriola culture, but currently, most Seriola fish are produced in cages, either in nearshore pens or in high-technology, submersible cages out in the open ocean. They are fed a range of diets, from trash fish to basic compound feeds to complex, formulated, compound feeds.

As is the case with the majority of aquaculture species, the farming of Seriola has associated environmental or other impacts.

- Capture of wild stocks for culture (juveniles/broodstock for hatcheries) can have direct impacts on associated populations and ecosystems.
- Environmental concerns exist over certain feeds used (fishmeal, oils, trash fish, etc.) for cultured carnivorous or piscivorous species.
- Disease is always of great concern within cultured species in terms of introduction and/or amplification of pathogens and parasites and subsequent infection of wild fish, as well as between farms.
- Escape of cultured fish is also a concern, which can have effects on wild stocks in terms of competition, predation, and genetic alterations, depending on vulnerability and robustness.
- A risk of pollution and habitat effects via nutrient losses and chemical additives always remains, which can cause problems depending on habitat vulnerability and where the farms are in relation to the coast.

With effective management of regulations and good farming practices, these problems can be avoided. To address these impacts, the WWF is creating the Seriola and Cobia Aquaculture Dialogue, the purpose of which is to create standards that will minimize the key impacts of Seriola/Cobia aquaculture and move producers towards better performance. This will be done by identifying the key environmental and social impacts associated with the farming of three types of Seriola (S. rivoliana, S. quinqueradiata and S. lalandi) and cobia, and principles established for addressing each impact. Then, criteria will be developed to provide direction on how to reduce each impact. It is open to all stakeholders, including producers and other members of the supply chain, researchers, nongovernmental and governmental organizations, and investors. The standards (finalised late 2011) will be adopted by the Aquaculture Stewardship Council, which will then work with independent, third-party entities to certify farms that are in compliance with the standards.

== Species ==
Nine recognized species are placed in this genus:

- Seriola carpenteri F. J. Mather, 1971 (Guinean amberjack)
- Seriola dumerili (A. Risso, 1810) (greater amberjack)
- Seriola fasciata (Bloch, 1793) (lesser amberjack)
- Seriola hippos Günther, 1876 (samson fish)
- Seriola lalandi Valenciennes, 1833 (yellowtail amberjack)
- Seriola peruana Steindachner, 1881 (fortune jack)
- Seriola quinqueradiata Temminck & Schlegel, 1845 (Japanese amberjack)
- Seriola rivoliana Valenciennes, 1833 (long-fin yellowtail, almaco jack, high-fin jack)
- Seriola zonata (Mitchill, 1815) (banded rudderfish)

Fishbase includes populations of fish similar to S. lalandi in the Northern Hemisphere within that species, but other authorities regard Seriola aureovittata from the North Pacific Ocean around Japan and Seriola dorsalis of the northeastern Pacific as separate, valid species, with S. lalandi being restricted to the Southern Hemisphere.

=== Fossil taxa ===
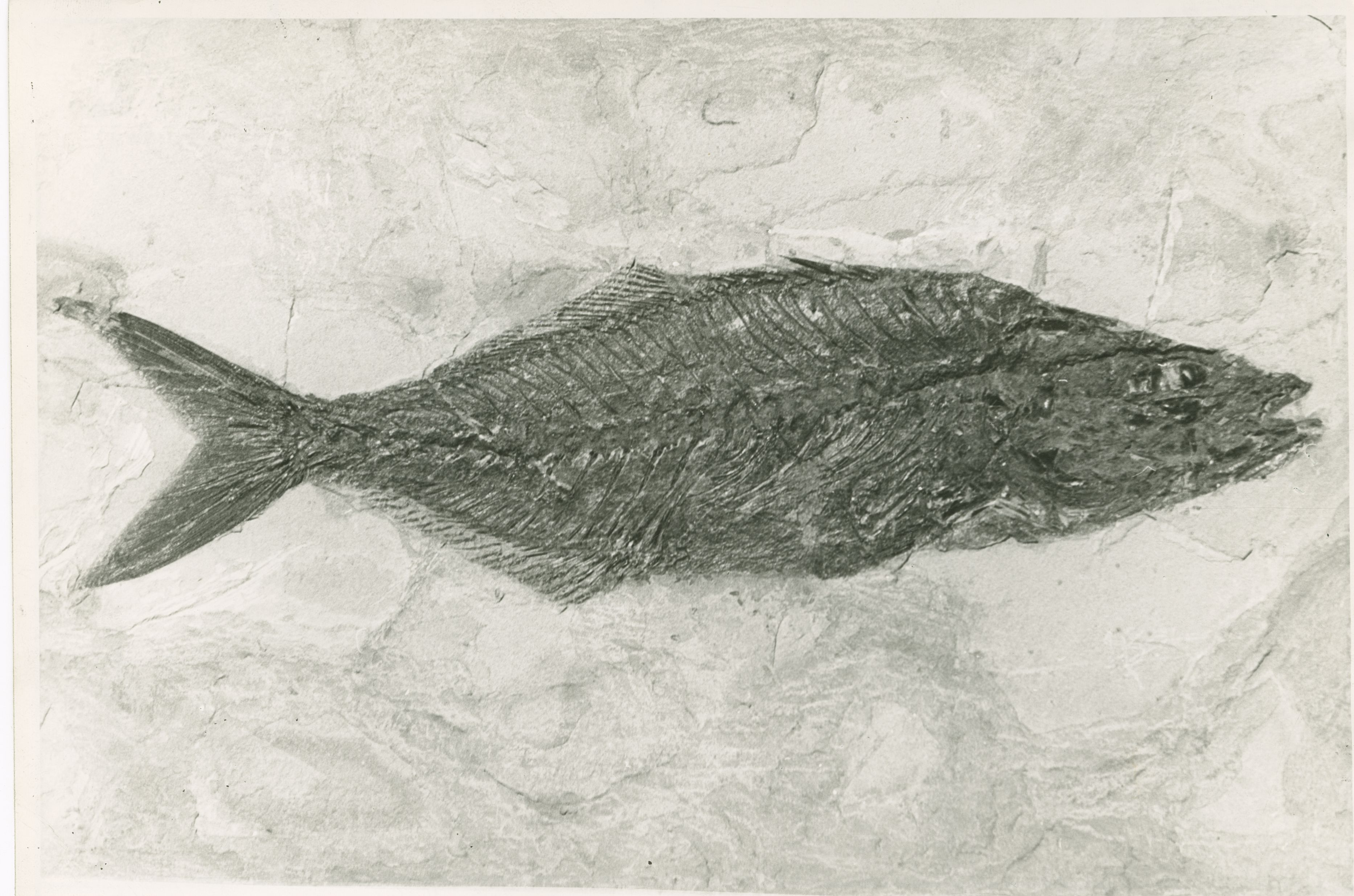
Seriola prisca, an Early Eocene species of Seriola from Monte Bolca, Italy

Seriola is a rather old and well-represented genus in the fossil record, with fossil remains known dating back to the earliest Eocene. The following fossil species are known:

- †Seriola dallonii Arambourg, 1927 (Late Miocene of Algeria)
- †Seriola fragosa Bannikov, 2002 (Middle Eocene of North Caucasus, Russia)
- †Seriola gracilis Böhm, 1942 (Oligocene of Hungary)
- †Seriola lata Bassani, 1889 (Oligocene of Italy)
- †Seriola multiradialis (Weiler, 1920) (Oligocene of Germany)
- †Seriola natgeosoc Bannikov, 2002 (Middle Eocene of North Caucasus, Russia)
- †Seriola paleocenica (Sytchevskaya & Prokofiev, 2005) (earliest Eocene of Turkmenistan) (=Karelinia paleocenica Sytchevskaya & Prokofiev, 2005)
- †Seriola prisca (Agassiz, 1834) (=Lichia prisca Agassiz, 1834) (Early Eocene of Italy)
- †Seriola sanctaebarbarae Jordan, 1921 (Late Miocene of California, USA)
- †Seriola smithvanizi Bannikov, 1996 (Early Miocene of North Caucasus, Russia)
- †Seriola stoppanii Bassani, 1889 (Oligocene of Italy)
