= Yellowtail (fish) =

A yellowtail may be any of several different species of fish, which often have caudal (tail) fins partially or entirely yellow in color. The amberjacks are commonly referred to simply as "yellowtail", such as the yellowtail amberjack (Seriola lalandi) or the Japanese amberjack (Seriola quinqueradiata), most often in the context of sushi. Other species called simply "yellowtail" include:

- Atlantic bumper, Chloroscombrus chrysurus
- Yellowtail flounder, Limanda ferruginea
- Yellowtail snapper, Ocyurus chrysurus
- Whitespotted devil, Plectroglyphidodon lacrymatus
- Yellowtail horse mackerel, Trachurus novaezelandiae

In addition, "yellowtail" appears in many other common names of fish:

- Butter yellowtail Seriolina nigrofasciata
- California yellowtail Seriola dorsalis
- Cape yellowtail Seriola lalandi
- Common yellowtail croaker Umbrina xanti
- Dusky yellowtail Seriolina nigrofasciata
- Giant yellowtail Seriola lalandi
- Great yellowtail Seriola dumerili
- Greater yellowtail Seriola dumerili
- Indian yellowtail angelfish Apolemichthys xanthurus
- Longfin yellowtail Seriola rivoliana
- Pacific yellowtail emperor Lethrinus atkinsoni
- Queensland yellowtail angelfish Chaetodontoplus meredithi
- Rainbow yellowtail Elagatis bipinnulata
- Redbelly yellowtail fusilier Caesio cuning
- Slender yellowtail kingfish Alepes djedaba
- Southeast Asian yellowtail rasbora Rasbora tornieri
- Southern yellowtail Seriola lalandi
- Yellowtail amberjack Seriola lalandi
- Yellowtail angelfish Apolemichthys xanthurus
- Yellowtail angelfish Centropyge fisheri
- Yellowtail angelfish Chaetodontoplus personifer
- Yellowtail ballyhoo Hemiramphus brasiliensis
- Yellowtail barracuda Sphyraena flavicauda
- Yellowtail bass Bathyanthias mexicana
- Yellowtail blue damsel Chrysiptera parasema
- Yellowtail blue snapper Paracaesio xanthura
- Yellowtail butterflyfish Chaetodon xanthurus
- Yellowtail catfish Pangasius pangasius
- Yellowtail chromis Chromis enchrysura
- Yellowtail clownfish Amphiprion clarkii
- Yellowtail clownfish Amphiprion sebae
- Yellowtail coris Coris gaimard
- Yellowtail croaker Austronibea oedogenys
- Yellowtail damsel Chrysiptera parasema
- Yellowtail damselfish Microspathodon chrysurus
- Yellowtail dascyllus Dascyllus flavicaudus
- Yellowtail demoiselle Neoglyphidodon polyacanthus
- Yellowtail dottyback Pseudochromis linda
- Yellowtail emperor Lethrinus crocineus
- Yellowtail fangblenny mimic Plagiotremus laudandus
- Yellowtail flounder Limanda ferruginea
- Yellowtail fusilier Caesio cuning
- Yellowtail fusilier Caesio teres
- Yellowtail fusilier Paracaesio xanthura
- Yellowtail goldie Mirolabrichthys evansi
- Yellowtail hamlet Hypoplectrus chlorurus
- Yellowtail horse mackerel Trachurus novaezelandiae
- Yellowtail kingfish Caranx heberi
- Yellowtail mullet Ellochelon vaigiensis
- Yellowtail mullet Minimugil cascasia
- Yellowtail parrotfish Sparisoma rubripinne
- Yellowtail poison-fang blenny Meiacanthus atrodorsalis
- Yellowtail rasbora Rasbora dusonensis
- Yellowtail rasbora Rasbora tornieri
- Yellowtail reefcod Epinephelus flavocaeruleus
- Yellowtail reeffish Chromis enchrysura
- Yellowtail rockcod Epinephelus flavocaeruleus
- Yellowtail rockfish Sebastes flavidus
- Yellowtail sailfin tang Zebrasoma xanthurum
- Yellowtail sardinella Sardinella rouxi
- Yellowtail scad Atule mate
- Yellowtail scad Trachurus novaezelandiae
- Yellowtail sergeant Abudefduf notatus
- Yellowtail snapper Ocyurus chrysurus
- Yellowtail surgeonfish Prionurus punctatus
- Yellowtail surgeonfish Zebrasoma xanthurum
- Yellowtail tamarin Anampses meleagrides
- Yellowtail tang Zebrasoma xanthurum
- Yellowtail tetra Alestopetersius caudalis
- Yellowtail trumpeter Amniataba caudavittata
- Yellowtail tubelip Diproctacanthus xanthurus
- Yellowtail wrasse Anampses meleagrides
