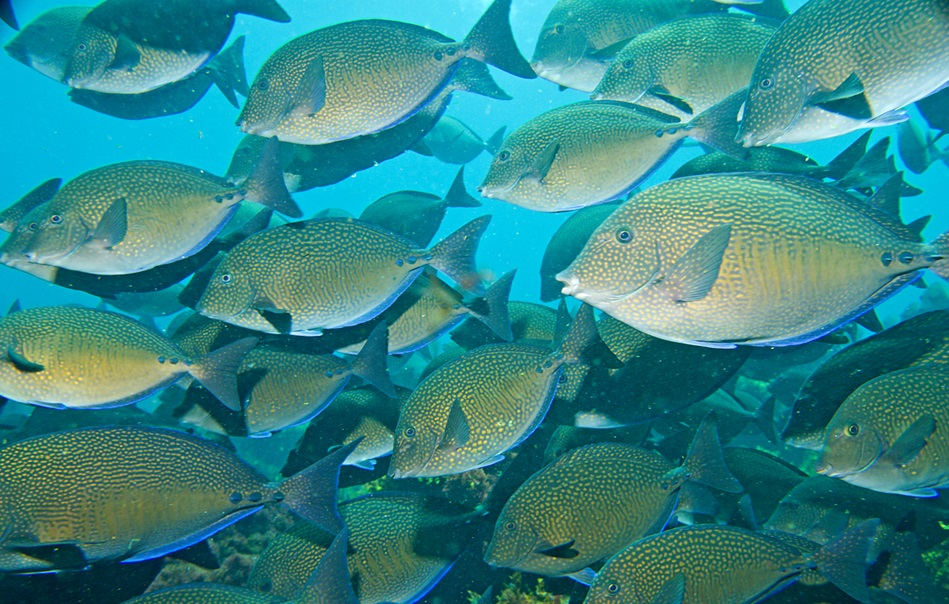
- Prionurus maculatus

Conservation status
- Least Concern (IUCN 3.1)

Scientific classification
- Kingdom: Animalia
- Phylum: Chordata
- Class: Actinopterygii
- Order: Acanthuriformes
- Family: Acanthuridae
- Genus: Prionurus
- Species: P. maculatus

Binomial name
- Prionurus maculatus J. D. Ogilby, 1887

= Yellowspotted sawtail =

Yellowspotted Sawtail

Species of fish

The yellowspotted sawtail (Prionurus maculatus), or spotted sawtail, is a species of marine ray-finned fish belonging to the family Acanthuridae, the surgeonfishes, unicornfishes and tangs. This fish is found in the southwest Pacific Ocean.

== Taxonomy ==
The yellowspotted sawtail was first formally described in 1887 by the Australian zoologist James Douglas Ogilby with its biology given as Port Jackson in Queensland. The genus Prionurus is the only genus in the tribe Prionurini which is one of three tribes in the subfamily Acanthurinae which is one of two subfamiles in the family Acanthuridae.

== Etymology ==
The yellowspotted sawtail has the specific name, maculatus which means "spotted", a reference to the small yellow spots present on the upper body and the head of this fish.

== Description ==
The yellowspotted sawtail has its dorsal fin supported by 9 spines and between 24 and 26 soft rays while the anal fin contains 3 spines and 23 to 25 soft rays. The body is deep, its depth being equivalent to a little over two times the standard length, and the head has a marginally convex dorsal profile and is steep between the snout and the origin of the dorsal fin. There are 3 blue and black keeled bony plates on the caudal peduncle and the caudal fin is weakly emarginate. The overall colour is bluish grey marked with many small yellow spots on the head and upper body. There are vertical yellow bars along the flanks and a whitish bar on the caudal peduncle. The yellowspotted sawtail has a maximum published total length of 45 cm (18 in).

== Distribution and habitat ==
The yellowspotted sawtail is endemic to the southwestern Pacific Ocean where it occurs along the eastern Coral Sea coast of Australia from Lord Howe Island and New South Wales north as far as the Capricorn Islands and Swains Reef in the Great Barrier Reef off Queensland. It has also been recorded from Norfolk Island, the Kermadec Islands and from northern New Zealand, south as far as the Three Kings Islands. This is a species of rocky shores as an adult but juveniles prefer sheltered bays and estuaries. It feeds on algae.
