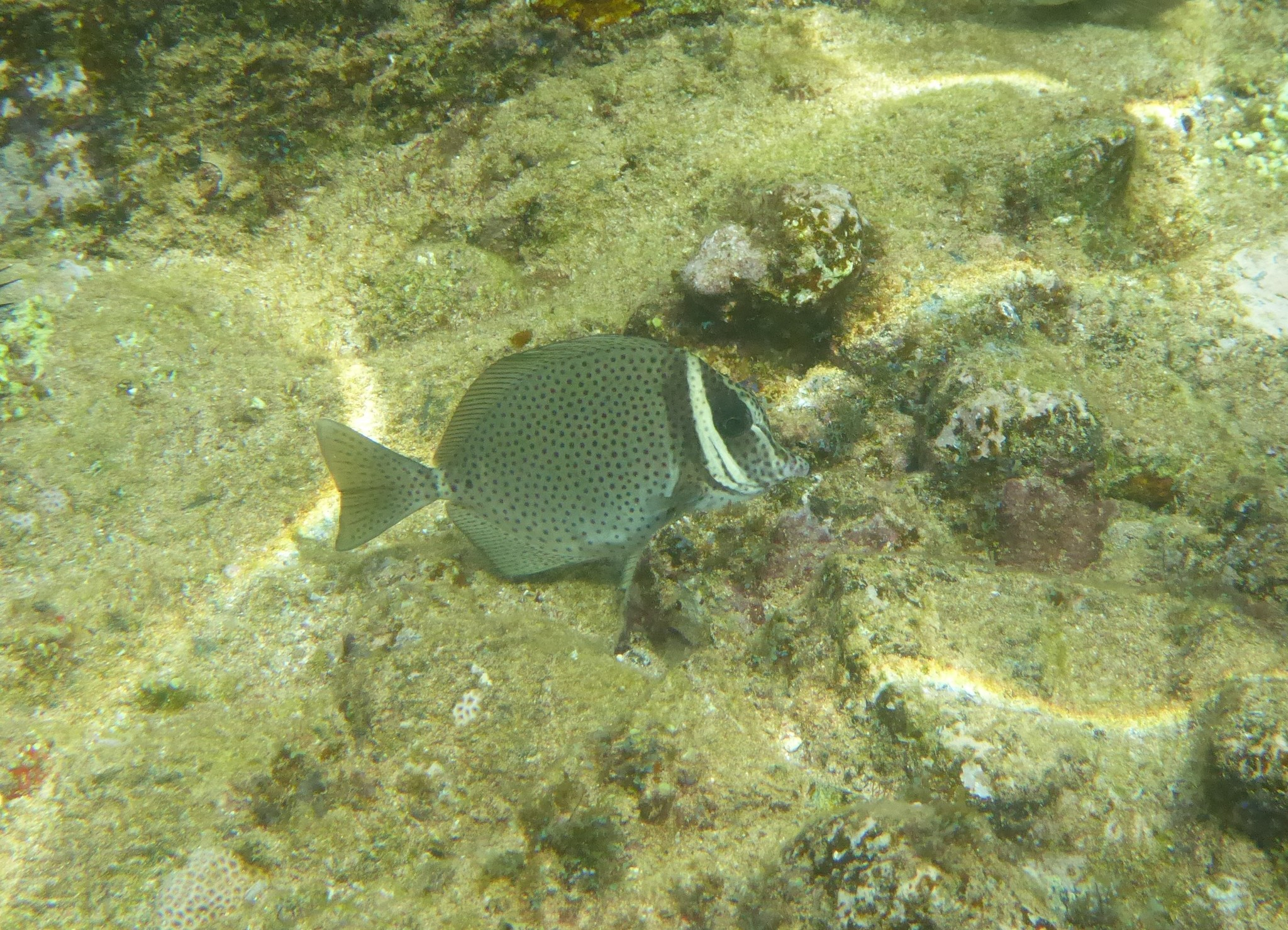

Conservation status
- Least Concern (IUCN 3.1)

Scientific classification
- Kingdom: Animalia
- Phylum: Chordata
- Class: Actinopterygii
- Division: Teleostei
- Order: Acanthuriformes
- Family: Acanthuridae
- Genus: Prionurus
- Species: P. biafraensis

Binomial name
- Prionurus biafraensis (Blache & Rossignol, 1961)

Synonyms
- Xesurus biafraensis Blanche & Rossignol, 1961

= Prionurus biafraensis =

Species of fish

Prionurus biafraensis, the Biafra doctorfish, is a species of marine ray-finned fish belonging to the family Acanthuridae, the surgeonfishes, unicornfishes and tangs. This fish is found in the eastern Atlantic Ocean.

== Taxonomy ==
Prionurus biafraensis was first formally described as Xesurus biafraensis in 1962 by the French zoologists Jacques Blache and Martial Rossignol with its type locality given as Pointe de Prayao, on São Tomé Island in the Gulf of Guinea. The genus Prionurus is the only genus in the tribe Prionurini which is one of three tribes in the subfamily Acanthurinae which is one of two subfamiles in the family Acanthuridae.

== Etymology ==
Prionurus biafrensis has a specific name, biafrensis which means "of Biafra", a reference to the type locality being in the Bight of Biafra in the Gulf of Guinea.

== Description ==
At Príncipe

Prionurus biafrensis has a deep, oblong and compressed body with its deepest part fitting into its standard length 1.8 times. The snout is distinct as there is a clear indent of the dorsal profile between the maxilla and the upper edge of the orbit. The dorsal profile of the head then climbs steeply to the origin of the dorsal fin before curving regularly downwards to the caudal peduncle. The ventral profile is less strongly curved. The dorsal fin is supported by 8 spines and 25 soft rays, with a clear notch between the spiny and soft rayed parts, and the anal fin contains 3 spines 24 soft rays The head is marked with 2 pale bars and there are 3 spines in the grooves on either side of the caudal peduncle. The maximum published total length of the Biafran doctorfish is 20 cm (7.9 in), although 15 cm (5.9 in) is more common.

== Distribution and habitat ==
Prionurus biafraensis is found in the Gulf of Guinea around the island of Sao Tomé and along the African coast from Cap Lopez in Gabon to Pointe Noire in the Republic of Congo. It occurs at depths between 5 and 25 m (16 and 82 ft) close to rocky shorelines where it is typically encountered in small groups.
