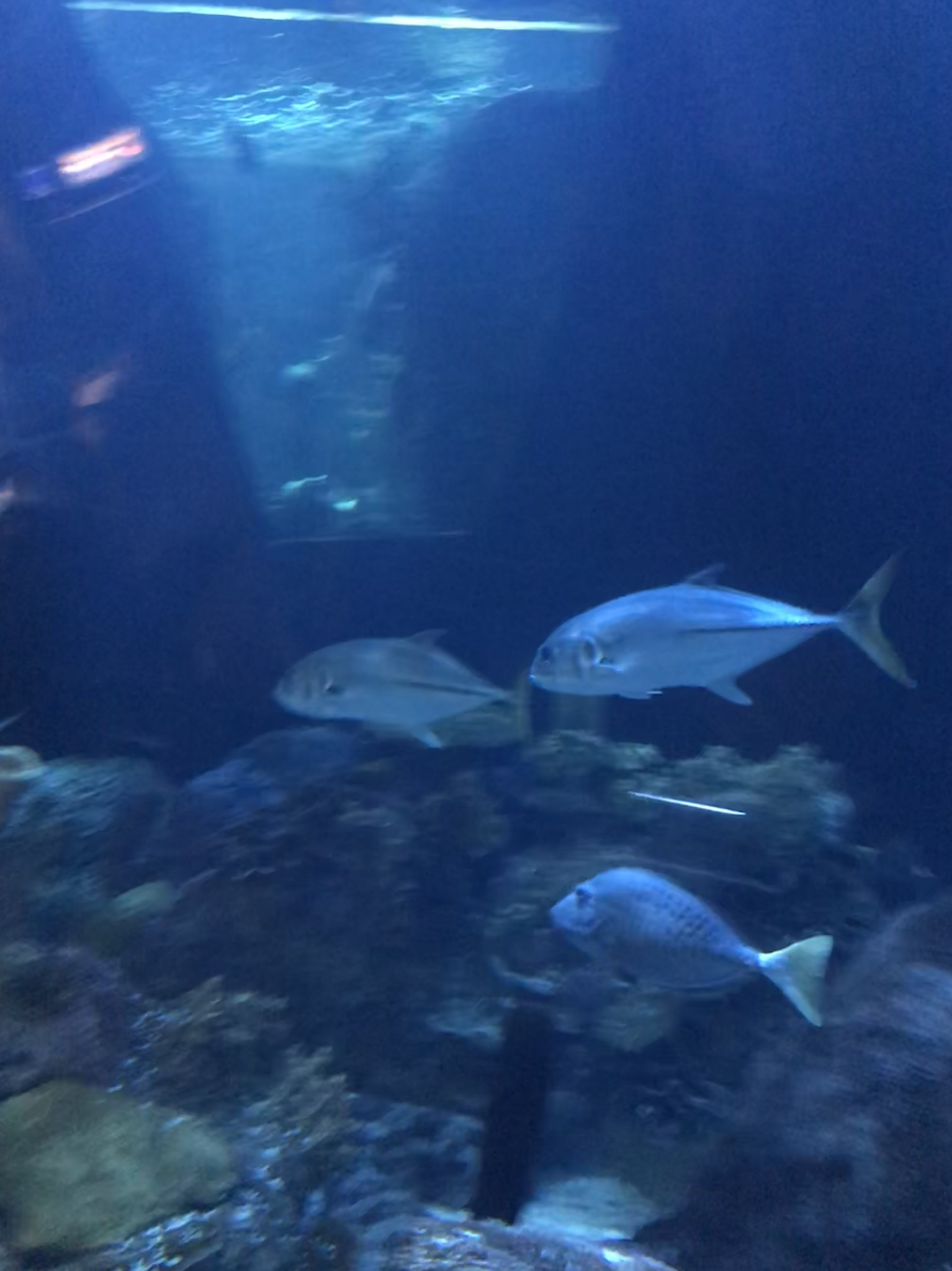
- Prionurus chrysurus can be seen as the bottom fish with the yellow tail, the top fish are horse-eye jack

Conservation status
- Data Deficient (IUCN 3.1)

Scientific classification
- Kingdom: Animalia
- Phylum: Chordata
- Class: Actinopterygii
- Order: Acanthuriformes
- Family: Acanthuridae
- Genus: Prionurus
- Species: P. chrysurus

Binomial name
- Prionurus chrysurus J. E. Randall, 2001

= Prionurus chrysurus =

Species of fish

Prionurus chrysurus, the Indonesian sawtail or yellowtail sawtail, is a species of marine ray-finned fish belonging to the family Acanthuridae, the surgeonfishes, unicornfishes and tangs. This fish is found in the western Pacific Ocean in Indonesia.

== Taxonomy ==
Prionurus chrysurus was first formally described in 2001 by the American ichthyologist John Ernest Randall with its type locality given as "the blue lagoon" at Padang Bai on Bali. The genus Prionurus is the only genus in the tribe Prionurini which is one of three tribes in the subfamily Acanthurinae which is one of two subfamiles in the family Acanthuridae.

== Etymology ==
Prionurus chrysurus has a specific name, chrysurus which combines "chrysos", meaning "gold", with ouros, which means "tail", a reference to the yellow caudal fin of this fish.

== Description ==
Prionurus chrysurus is a distinctive species within the genus Prionurus, the dorsal fin is supported by 9 spines and 23 soft rays, the anal fin contains 3 spines and 22 soft rays. The pectoral fins have 17 rays. There are between 8 and 10 bony plates with keels on the middle of the rear flanks and many small bony plates on the upper rear part of the body. The overall colour is brown, with thin vermillion bars on the flanks and a yellow caudal fin. The maximum published standard length of the Indonesian sawtail is 30 cm (12 in).

== Distribution and habitat ==
Prionurus chrysurus is found in the Western Pacific Ocean where it is known only from Indonesia. It is found from Bali to western Flores and also off Lombok. The species in the genus Prionurus shows an Antitropical distribution in the Pacific preferring cooler waters and the Indonesian sawtail prefers upwellings where the water temperature is 20-23 °C. It has been postulated that it is a glacial relict which had a wider distribution in a period off global cooler temperatures.
