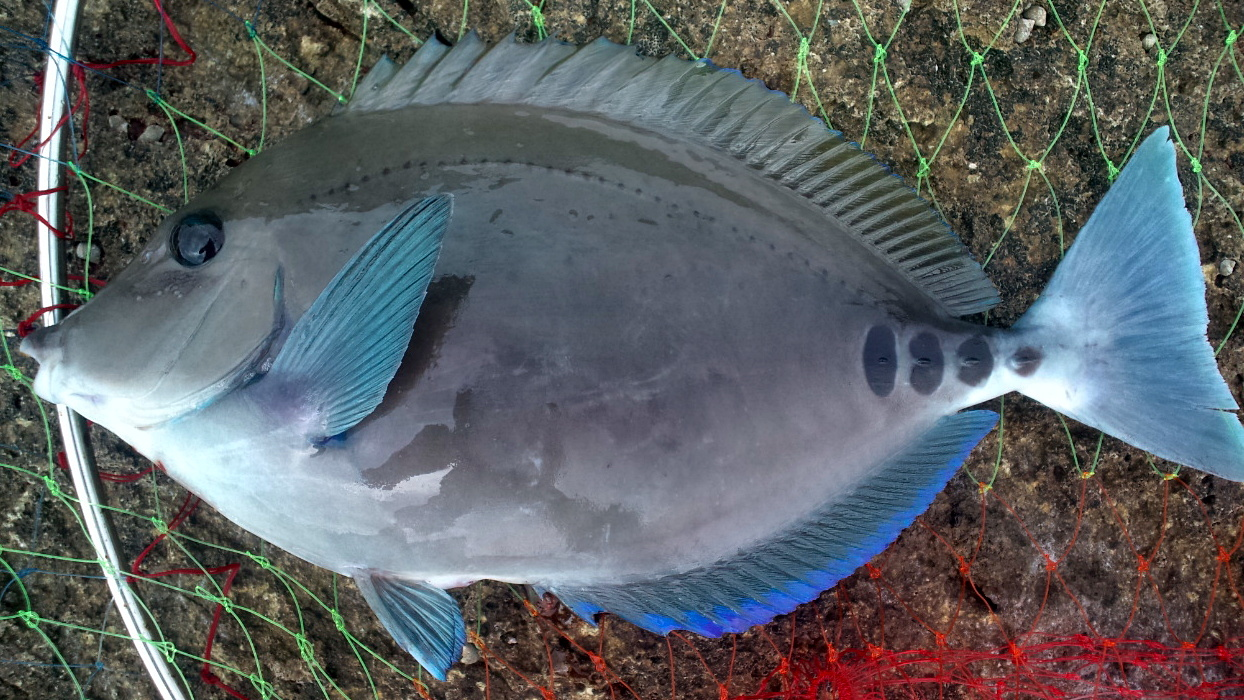

Conservation status
- Data Deficient (IUCN 3.1)

Scientific classification
- Kingdom: Animalia
- Phylum: Chordata
- Class: Actinopterygii
- Order: Acanthuriformes
- Family: Acanthuridae
- Genus: Prionurus
- Species: P. scalprum

Binomial name
- Prionurus scalprum Valenciennes, 1835

Synonyms
- Xesurus scalprum (Valenciennes, 1835)

= Prionurus scalprum =

Species of fish

Prionurus scalprum, the scalpel sawtail or Japanese sawtail, is a species of marine ray-finned fish belonging to the family Acanthuridae, the surgeonfishes, unicornfishes and tangs. This fish is found in the northwestern Pacific Ocean.
