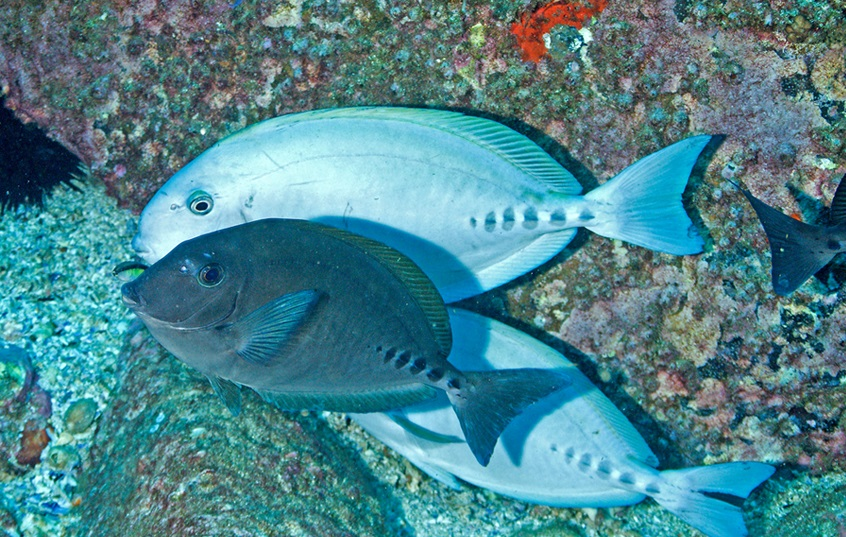

Conservation status
- Least Concern (IUCN 3.1)

Scientific classification
- Kingdom: Animalia
- Phylum: Chordata
- Class: Actinopterygii
- Order: Acanthuriformes
- Family: Acanthuridae
- Genus: Prionurus
- Species: P. microlepidotus

Binomial name
- Prionurus microlepidotus Lacépède, 1804

= Prionurus microlepidotus =

Species of fish

Prionurus microlepidotus, the sixplate sawtail, Australian sawtail or sawtail surgeonfish, is a species of marine ray-finned fish belonging to the family Acanthuridae, the surgeonfishes, unicornfishes and tangs. This fish is found in the southwest Pacific Ocean.

== Taxonomy ==
Prionurus microlepidotus was first formally described in 1804 by the French naturalist Bernard Germain de Lacépède with its type locality ascertained to be New South Wales, the type having been collected by François Péron. The genus Prionurus is the only genus in the tribe Prionurini which is one of three tribes in the subfamily Acanthurinae which is one of two subfamiles in the family Acanthuridae.

== Etymology ==
Prionurus microlepidotus has the specific name, microlepidotus which means "small scaled", a reference to the very small scales of this fish.

== Description ==
Prionurus microlepidotus has its dorsal fin supported by 8 rays and 21 to 22 soft rays while the anal fin is supported by 3 rays and 20 or 21 soft rays and there are 16 rays in the pectoral fin. The body varies in depth from half the standard length in subadults to over a third of the standard length in larger adults. The larger adults have a small protuberance on the snout just above the mouth. There are six keeled bony plates on each side of the rear of the body and the caudal peduncle and the caudal fin is emarginate. The body is uniformly grey with a slender lateral line the bony plates on the rear of the body are within dusky blotches. It can show a white band at the base of the caudal fin and, when visiting cleaning stations it can change colour to all white. The maximum published total length of this species is 70 cm (28 in).

== Distribution and habitat ==
Prionurus microlepidotus is endemic to the southwestern Pacific and has been recorded only from Australian waters where it ranges from New South Wales in the south to Townsville in Queensland in the north, also around Lord Howe Island. This species is found along rock shores and on coral reefs, although juveniles prefer sheltered habitats such as bays and estuaries. They gather in schools and graze on benthic algae.
