= Prionurus =

- Prionurus microlepidotus

Scientific classification
- Kingdom: Animalia
- Phylum: Chordata
- Class: Actinopterygii
- Division: Teleostei
- Order: Acanthuriformes
- Family: Acanthuridae
- Subfamily: Acanthurinae
- Tribe: Prionurini; J. L. B. Smith, 1966
- Genus: Prionurus; Lacépède, 1804

Type species
- Prionurus microlepidotus Lacépède, 1804

Species
- 7, see text

Synonyms
- Acanthocaulus Waite, 1900; Burobulla Whitley, 1931; Dasyacanthurus Fowler, 1944; Triacanthurodes Fowler, 1944; Xesurus Jordan & Evermann, 1896

Genus of fishes

Prionurus is a genus of marine ray-finned fishes belonging to the family Acanthuridae, the surgeonfishes, unicornfishes and tangs, although some of the species in this genus are called sawtails or doctorfish. The species in this genus are found in the Pacific Ocean with one species, P. biafraensis, found in the Atlantic Ocean.

== Taxonomy ==
Prionurus was first proposed as a monospecific genus in 1804 by the French naturalist Bernard Germain de Lacépède when he described Prionurus microlepidotus. Lacépède did not give a type locality but the type was collected by François Péron off New South Wales. The genus Prionurus is the only genus in the tribe Prionurini which is one of three tribes in the subfamily Acanthurinae which is one of two subfamiles in the family Acanthuridae.

== Etymology ==
Prionurus means "sawtail" a reference to the 3 to 7 immobile keeled bony plates on each side of the caudal peduncle.

== Species ==
There are currently seven recognized species in this genus:

Image	Species	Common name
	Prionurus biafraensis (Blache & Rossignol, 1961)	Biafra doctorfish
	Prionurus chrysurus J. E. Randall, 2001	
	Prionurus laticlavius (Valenciennes, 1846)	razor surgeonfish
	Prionurus maculatus J. D. Ogilby, 1887	yellowspotted sawtail
	Prionurus microlepidotus Lacépède, 1804	sixplate sawtail
	Prionurus scalprum Valenciennes, 1835	scalpel sawtail

== Characteristics ==
Prionurus species have oval, compressed bodies with a steep angle on the head above the snout. The small mouth is protrusible and is positioned low on the head. The teeth are set closely together and are moderately large, flattened and have serrated edges. They have 8 or 9 spines in the dorsal fin and 3 spines in the anal fin. The caudal peduncle has between 3 and 7 bony plates with sharp keels on each side. The spined keels in the caudal peduncle are immobile in this genus compared to mobile ones in other surgeonfishes. These fishes vary in their maximum published total lengths from 20 cm (7.9 in) in P. biafraensis to 70 cm (28 in) in P. microlepidotus.

== Distribution ==
Prionurus have a predominantly Pacific range with six of the seven species being found in the Pacific Ocean, two of these, P. laticlavus and P. punctatus being endemic to the eastern Pacific and one, P. biafraensis, being endemic to the Eastern Atlantic.
