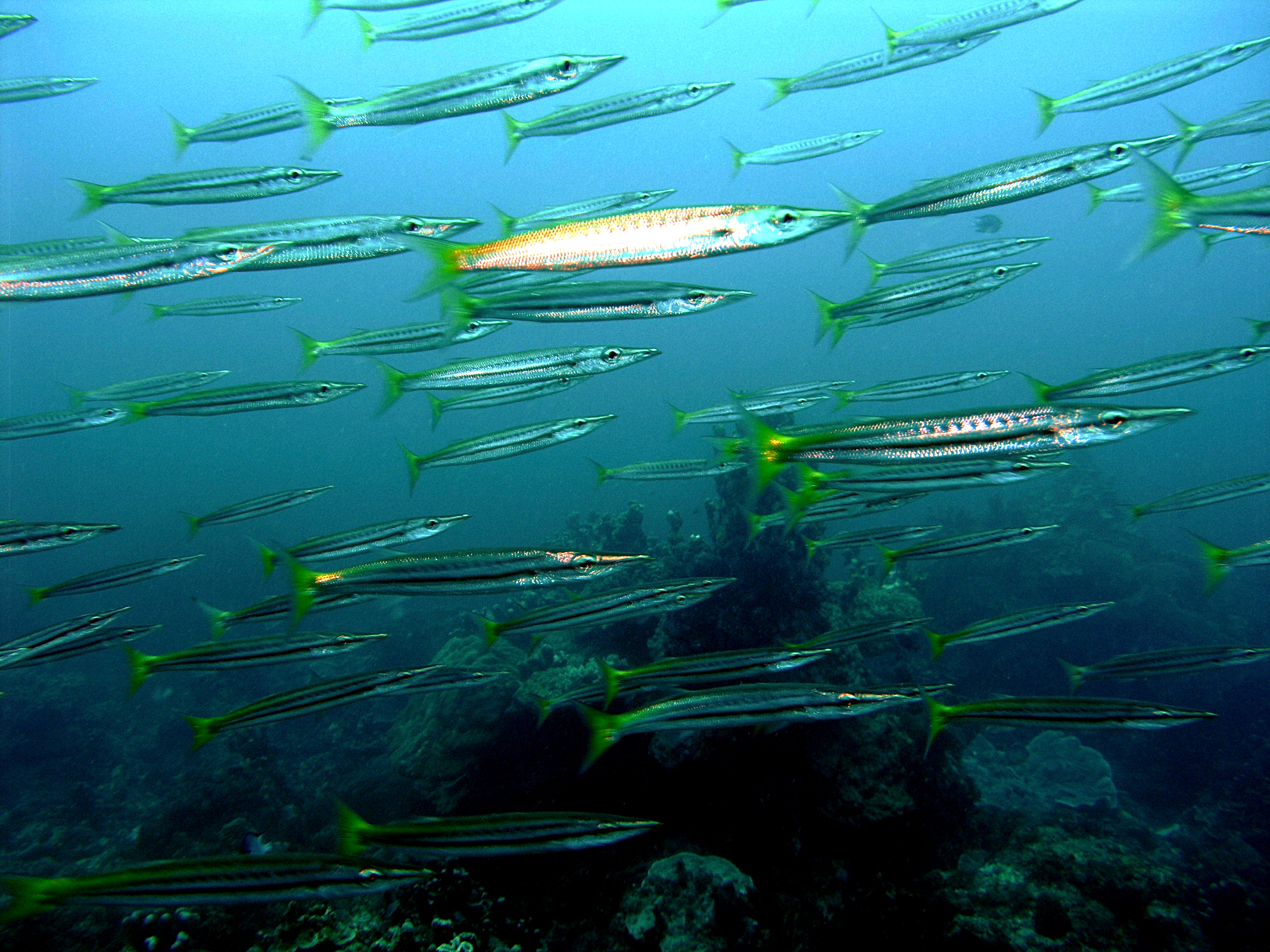

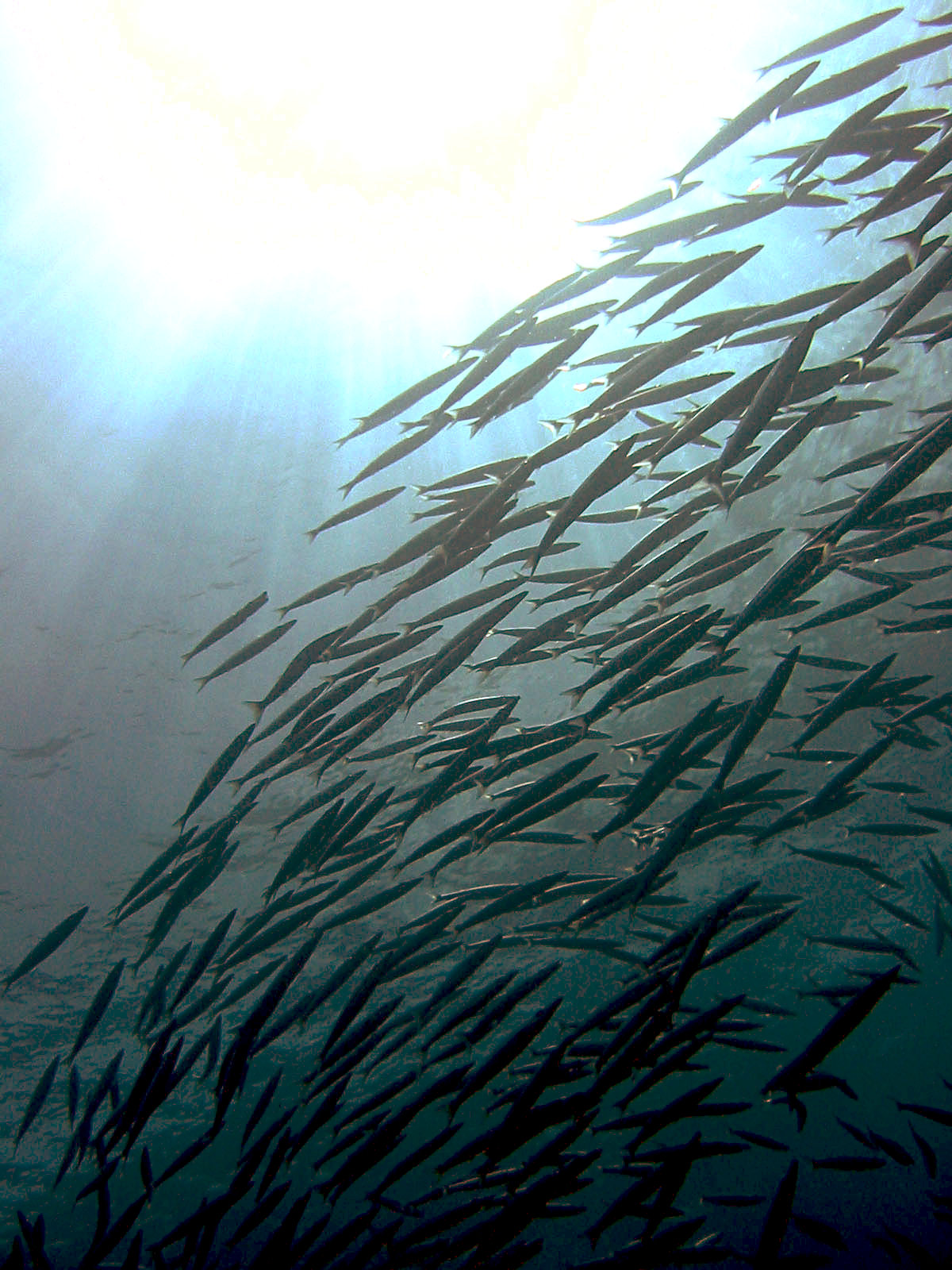
- Juveniles schooling, Dahab

Conservation status
- Least Concern (IUCN 3.1)

Scientific classification
- Kingdom: Animalia
- Phylum: Chordata
- Class: Actinopterygii
- Order: Carangiformes
- Suborder: Centropomoidei
- Family: Sphyraenidae
- Genus: Sphyraena
- Species: S. flavicauda

Binomial name
- Sphyraena flavicauda Rüppell, 1838
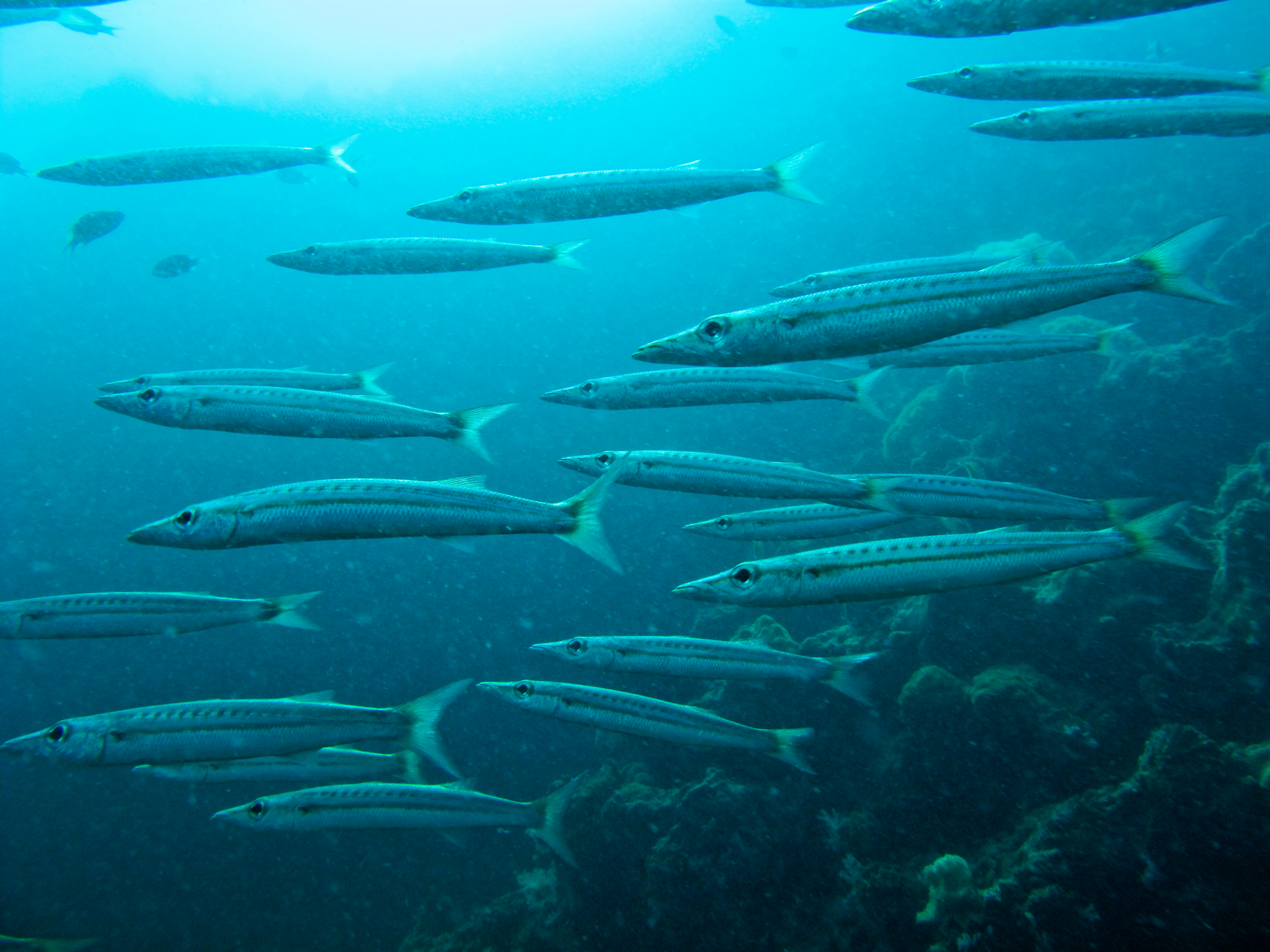

Synonyms
- Sphyraena langsar (Rüppell, 1838); Sphyraenella flavicauda Bleeker, 1855

= Yellowtail barracuda =

Species of fish

The yellowtail barracuda (Sphyraena flavicauda) is one of the smaller species of barracuda of the family Sphyraenidae, which can be found in Indo-West Pacific oceans. It has also invaded the Mediterranean through the Suez Canal from the Red Sea, making it one of the Lessepsian migrants.

== Description ==
The yellowtail barracuda has an elongated body with two well separated dorsal fins. The anterior dorsal fin has five spines with the first spine being the longest. The origin of the second dorsal fin is positioned slightly in front of that of the anal fin. The pelvic fin is located below the tip of the pectoral fin, which in turn is positioned in front of the origin of the anterior dorsal fin.

The large head is slightly flattened towards the rear and bears a large eye, pointed snout and long jaws, with a prognathic lower jaw. In the front of the upper jaw there are several fang-like teeth, then 4–5 sharp teeth which form a single row on the palatine followed by a single row of smaller teeth on premaxilla. The lower jaw has a single large canine-like tooth at its apex followed by a row of smaller sharp teeth along the each side of the jaw.

The yellowtail barracuda is grey in colour on the back with a countershaded pattern of a white underside, though occasionally the flanks show a yellow tint. The tail is yellow with black margins.

Yellowtail barracudas can grow to 60 centimetres (24 in) but 35–40 centimetres (14–16 in) is normal.

== Distribution ==
The yellowtail barracuda is found from the Red Sea east through the Indian and Pacific Oceans to Samoa, its northern limit is the Ryukyu Islands and its southern is on the Great Barrier Reef. First recorded in the Mediterranean Sea off Israel in 1991, it is now extending to the whole eastern Basin. It is established but still relatively rare in the Mediterranean but its true status may be obscured by confusion with sympatric congeners, although both the yellowtail barracuda and Sphyraena chrysotaenia were found to be common off the coast of Libya.

== Biology ==
Yellowtail barracudas school by day in lagoons, inner and outer reef slopes and is probably a nocturnal hunter of fish and large invertebrates. Their eggs and fry are planktonic while the juveniles shelter in very sheltered coastal waters. The adults attain a maximum age of six years old. In Australia the yellowtail barracuda was found to be a host to the parasitic Floriceps minacanthus (a tapeworm) while the ectoparasite Diplectanum cazauxi (a monogenean) has been found on the gills of a number of barracuda species, including the yellowtail barracuda. Another known ectoparasite of the yellowtail barracuda is the Caligus inopinatus (a copepod).
