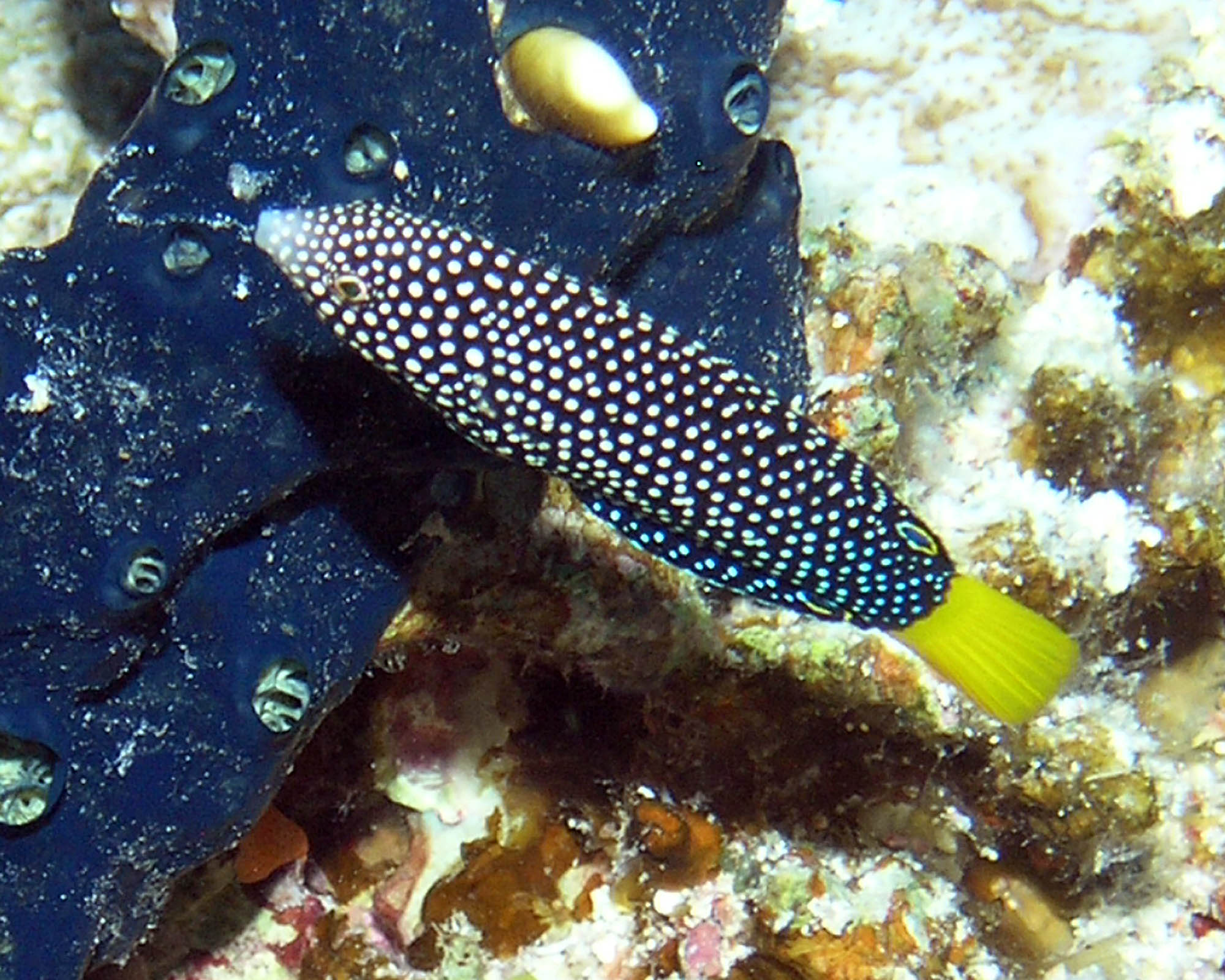

Conservation status
- Least Concern (IUCN 3.1)

Scientific classification
- Kingdom: Animalia
- Phylum: Chordata
- Class: Actinopterygii
- Order: Labriformes
- Family: Labridae
- Genus: Anampses
- Species: A. meleagrides

Binomial name
- Anampses meleagrides Valenciennes, 1840

Synonyms
- Anampses amboinensis [[}itere Bleeker|Bleeker]], 1857; Anampses meleagris Günther, 1862; Anampses lunatus Sauvage, 1891; Anampses ikedai S. Tanaka, 1908; Anampses nagayoi S. Tanaka, 1908

= Spotted wrasse =

Species of fish

The spotted wrasse, Anampses meleagrides, is a species of wrasse native to the Indian Ocean from the Red Sea and East Africa to the western Pacific Ocean to Samoa and the Tuamoto Islands and north to Japan. This species is found on coral reefs at depths of 3 to 60 m (9.8 to 196.9 ft). It can reach a length of 22 cm (8.7 in). It is of minor importance to local commercial fisheries and can be found in the aquarium trade.

== Common name ==
Spotted wrasse, Yellow tail tamarin

== Habitat ==
Salt water

== Dispersion ==
Andaman sea

== Utilization ==
Fishery: Small Trading, Aquarium: Trade
