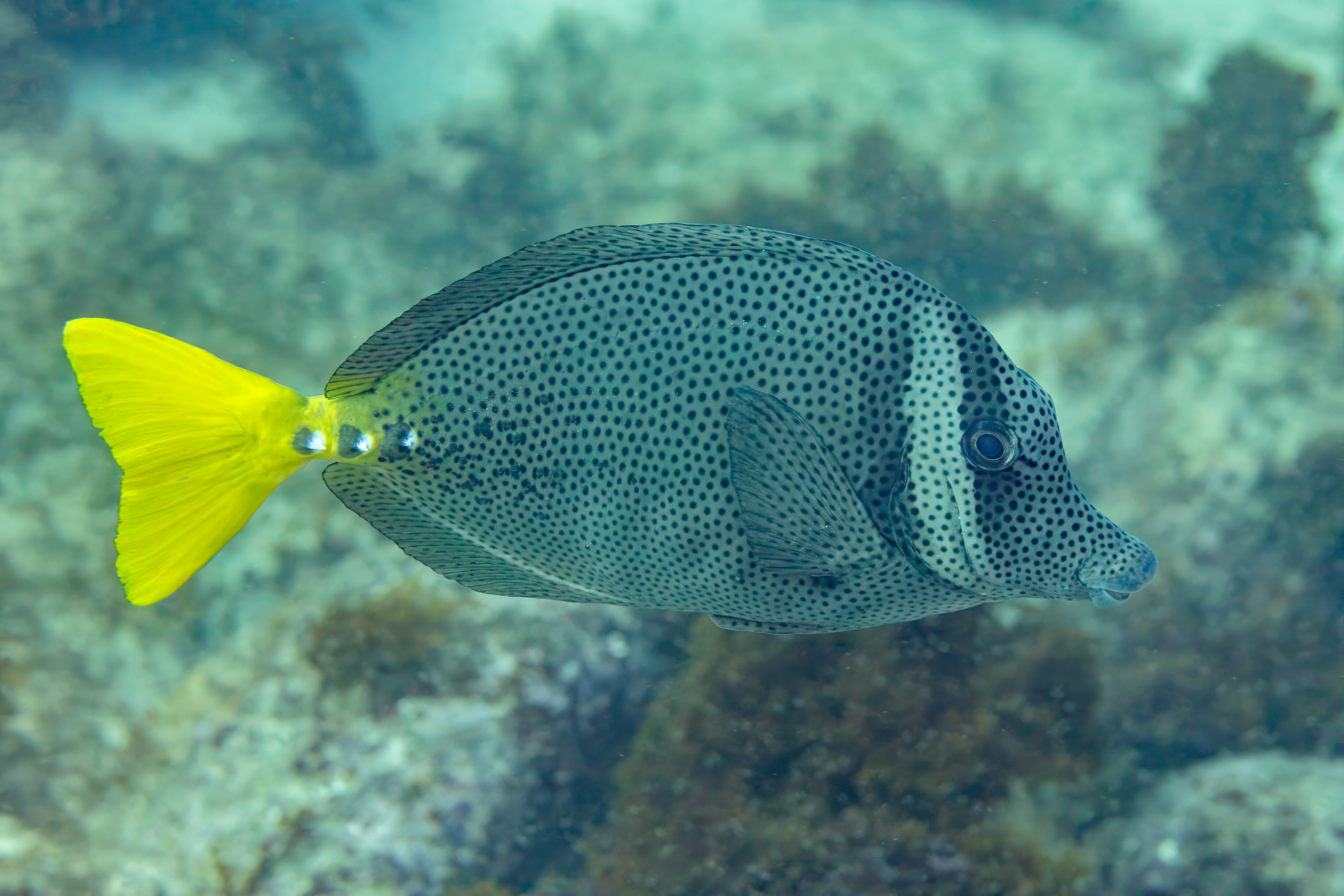
- In the Gulf of California

Conservation status
- Least Concern (IUCN 3.1)

Scientific classification
- Kingdom: Animalia
- Phylum: Chordata
- Class: Actinopterygii
- Division: Teleostei
- Order: Acanthuriformes
- Family: Acanthuridae
- Genus: Prionurus
- Species: P. laticlavius

Binomial name
- Prionurus laticlavius (Valenciennes, 1846)

Synonyms
- List: Naseus laticlavius Valenciennes, 1846; Xesurus laticlavius (Valenciennes, 1846); Xesurus clarionis Gilbert & Starks, 1897; Prionurus clarionis (Gilbert & Starks, 1897); Xesurus hopkinsi Gilbert & Starks, 1904; Prionurus hopkinsi (Gilbert & Starks, 1904)

= Prionurus laticlavius =

Species of fish

Prionurus laticlavius the razor surgeonfish or razor sawtail, is a species of marine ray-finned fish belonging to the family Acanthuridae, the surgeonfishes, unicornfishes and tangs. This fish is found in the eastern central Pacific Ocean.

== Taxonomy ==
Prionurus laticlavius was first formally described as Naseus laticlavius in 1846 by the French zoologist Achille Valenciennes with its biology given as Galápagos Islands. The genus Prionurus is the only genus in the tribe Prionurini which is one of three tribes in the subfamily Acanthurinae which is one of two subfamiles in the family Acanthuridae.

Prionurus punctatus was first formally described in 1862 by the American biologist Theodore Gill with its type locality given as Cape San Lucas in Baja California Sur. P. punctatus was later regarded as a synonym of P. laticlavius.

== Etymology ==
The specific name laticlavius combines latus, meaning "wide", with clavius, which means "bar". This is thought to be a reference to the brown or blackish stripe on the otherwise yellow body of the juveniles.

== Distribution and habitat ==
Schooling, in the Galapagos

Prionurus laticlavius is found in the eastern central Pacific Ocean along the western coasts of Central and South America between Costa Rica in the north and Colombia in the south, as well as around Cocos Island, Malpelo Island and the Galápagos Islands. It has been recorded as far north as the southern Gulf of California and the Revillagigedo Islands. It occurs on reefs in shallow water where it lives insmall groups and feeds on algae.

== Description ==
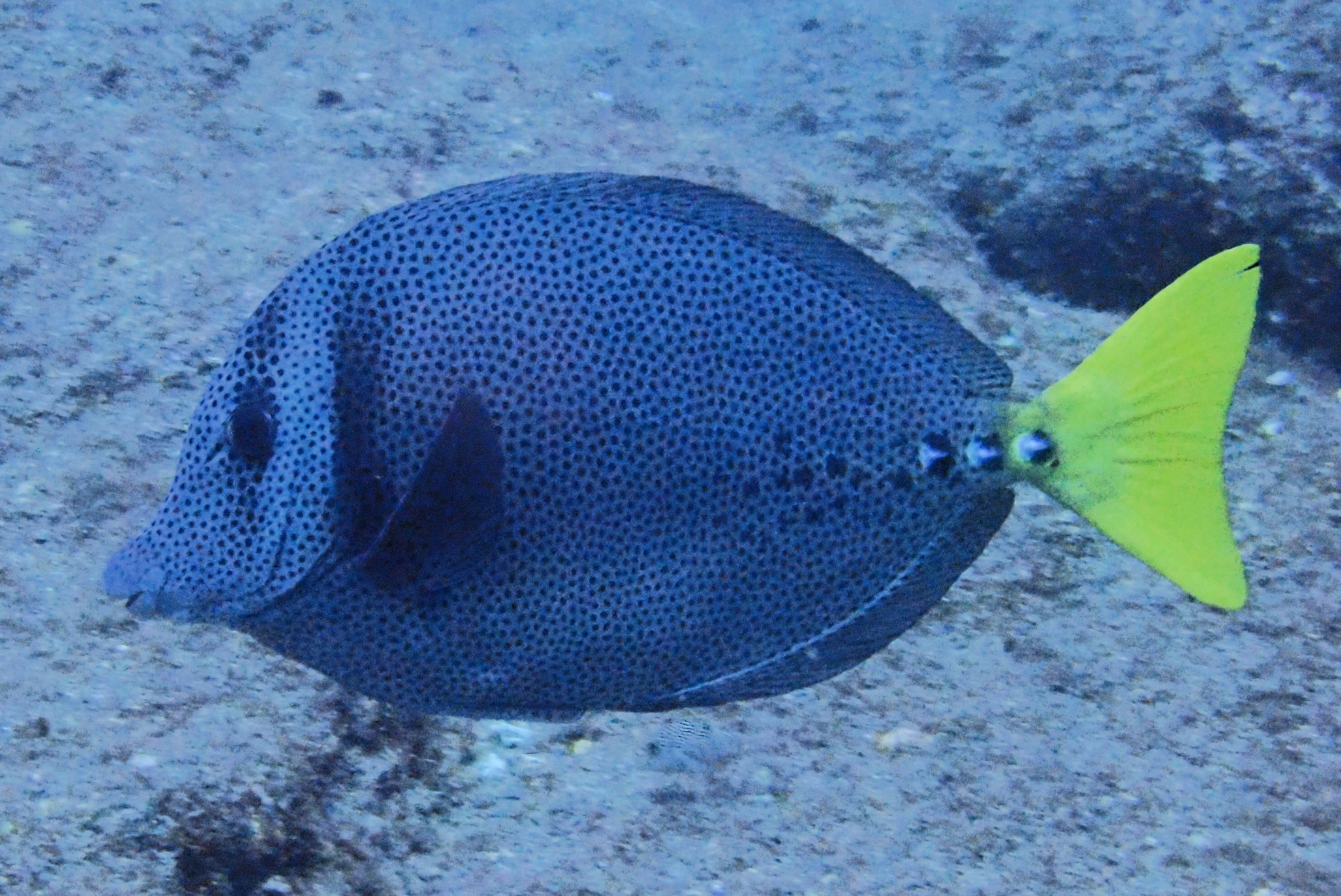
Northern form

Southen form

Prionurus laticlavius has an oval compressed body with a steep dorsal profile on the head with the eye positioned high on the head. The teeth are moderately large, set closely, flattened with strongly serrated edges. The dorsal fin is supported by 7 or 8 spines and 27 or 29 soft rays while the anal fin contains 3 spines and 23 soft rays. There are 3 bony plates along each side of the caudal peduncle. The scales are small and ctenoid. The overall colour is grey contrasting with the yellow caudal fin with a dark vertical bar through the eye and another at the back of the head. The juveniles are largely yellow in colour. The razor surgeonfish has a maximum published total length of 60 cm (24 in) although 25 cm (9.8 in) is more typical.

P. laticlavius has two colour forms. Along the Pacific coast of the Americas, the spotted form is found north of Costa Rica, while the unspotted form is found south of Costa Rica. However, both forms also occur at offshore islands at latitudes that differ from that of their coastal distribution. The spotted northern form was once considered the distinct species P. puncatatus.
