= Yellowtail croaker =

Conservation status
- Least Concern (IUCN 3.1)

Scientific classification
- Kingdom: Animalia
- Phylum: Chordata
- Class: Actinopterygii
- Order: Acanthuriformes
- Family: Sciaenidae
- Genus: Austronibea; Trewavas, 1977
- Species: A. oedogenys

Binomial name
- Austronibea oedogenys Trevawas, 1977

Species of fish

The yellowtail croaker (Austronibea oedogenys), also known as the yellowtail jewfish, is a species of marine ray-finned fish belonging to the family Sciaenidae, the drums and croakers. This species is found in the southwestern Pacific Ocean off northern Australia and southern New Guinea. It is the only species in the monospecific genus Austronibea.

== Taxonomy ==
The yellowtail croaker was first formally described in 1977 by the English ichthyologist Ethelwynn Trewavas with its type locality given as Repulse Bay in Queensland. When she described the new species Trevawas classified it in the new monospecific genus Austronibea. This fish belongs to the family Sciaenidae in the order Acanthuriformes.

== Etymology ==
Austronibea, the genus name. prefixes austro, meaning "southern", to Nibea, a genus Trevawas said bore some resemblance to this one in the form of its swim bladder and skeletal features. The specific name, oedogenys, means "swollen cheek", an allusion to "the orbital bone being swollen by the lateral line canal".

== Description ==
The yellowtail croaker is a relatively small species of croaker which has a maximum published standard length of 20 cm (7.9 in), although 15 cm (5.9 in) is more typical. It has a swollen, pointed snout which clearly protrudes in front of the upper jaw of the inferior mouth. The jaws each have rows of large and small teeth, the larger teeth forming the outer row in the upper jaw and the inner row in the lower jaw. The dorsal fin has 10, sometimes 9, spines in front of the incision and a single spine and between 27 and 30 soft rays to the rear of the incision. The anal fin is supported by 2 spines and 7 soft rays. The caudal fin is a rhomboid shape. There are cycloid scales on the head and throat while ctenoid scales cover the other parts of body with small scales present on the soft-rayed part of the dorsal fin. The lateral line scales extend to the tip of the caudal fin. They have a carrot shaped swim bladder which has around 20 pairs of fan-like appendages along its sides, the first pair enters the head. The body is dark purplish, fading to silvery ventrally. The scales on the sides have orange edges and there is a bluish-green blotch on the operculum. The caudal fin is yellow with a dense pattern of small brown spots.

== Distribution and habitat ==
The yellowtail croaker occurs across tropical northern Australia, from Joseph Bonaparte Gulf in Western Australia, to the Fitzroy River in Queensland, and along the southern coast of New Guinea in the Sahul Shelf region. It has also been recorded from Ambon Island and Timor Leste. This species is found at depths between 6 and 59 m (20 and 194 ft) in shallow coastal waters in estuaries over substrates made up of sand, rocks, rubble, soft corals and black corals.
