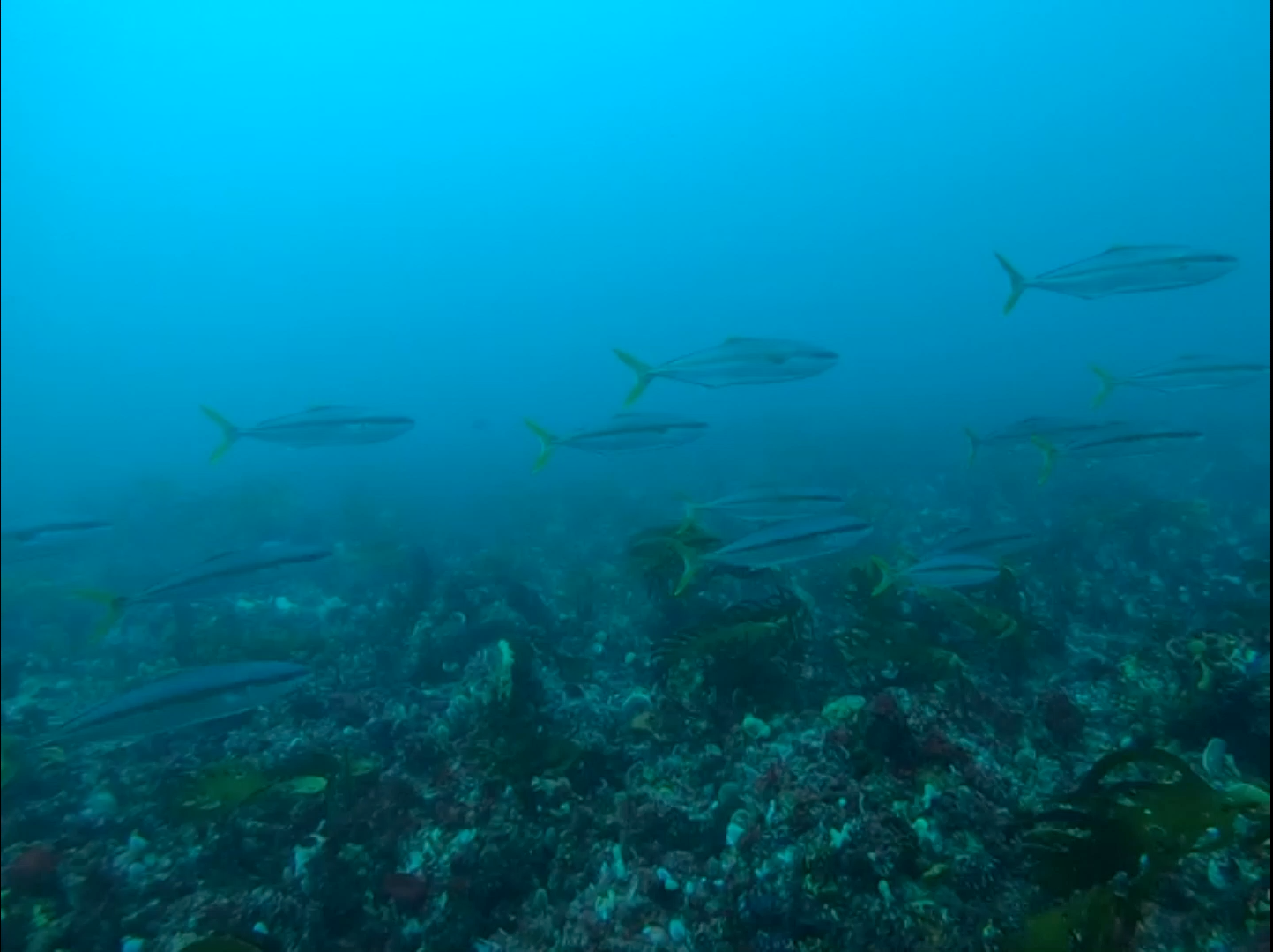

Conservation status
- Least Concern (IUCN 3.1)

Scientific classification
- Kingdom: Animalia
- Phylum: Chordata
- Class: Actinopterygii
- Order: Carangiformes
- Suborder: Carangoidei
- Family: Carangidae
- Genus: Seriola
- Species: S. dorsalis

Binomial name
- Seriola dorsalis (Gill, 1863)

Synonyms
- Halatractus dorsalis Gill, 1863; Seriola mazatlana Steindachner, 1876

= Seriola dorsalis =

California yellowtail

Species of fish

Seriola dorsalis, the California yellowtail, is a species of ray-finned fish of the family Carangidae. This species is also known by several alternate names, such as yellowtail jack, amberjack, forktail, mossback, white salmon and yellowtail tunis or tuna or by its Spanish name jurel. Although previously thought to belong to S. lalandi, recent genetic analysis distinguished California yellowtail (S. dorsalis) as a distinct species from the yellowtail amberjack (S. lalandi). The California yellowtail is differentiated from yellowtail amberjack as they differ in range. The yellowtail amberjack is found farther south in the Pacific Ocean.

== Description ==
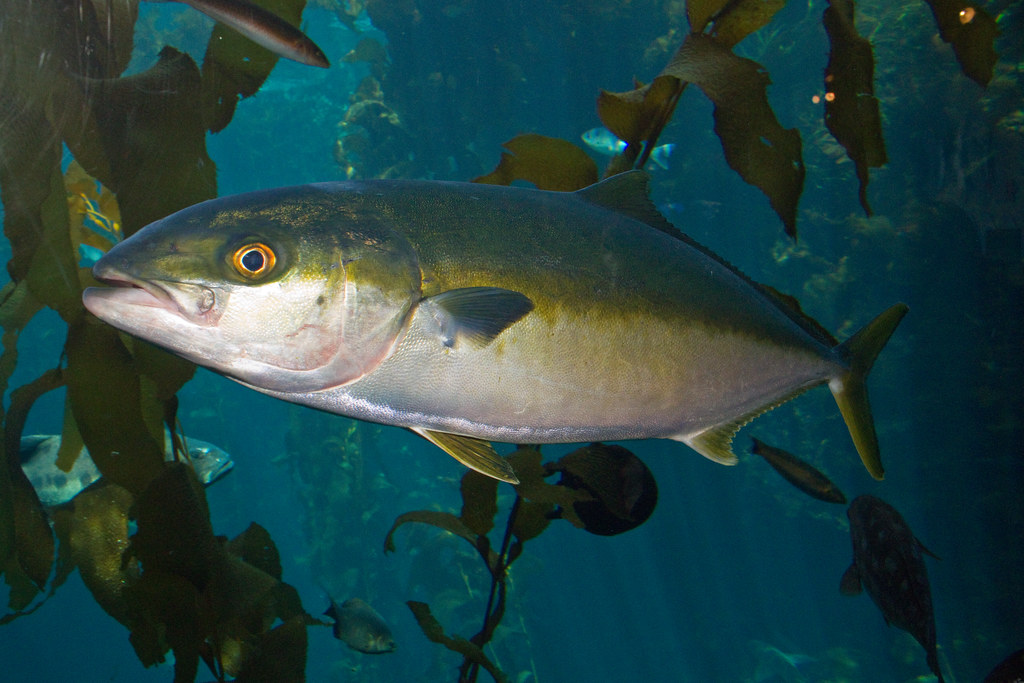
California yellowtail swimming through kelp, showing its front left profile.

The California yellowtail can be recognized by its fusiform body plan, which tapers at both the anterior and posterior ends, a bulbous shaped head slightly swelled above the eye, and the visibly expanded posterior end of its jaw, which allows for its mouth to open large for its prey. The California yellowtail has a yellow caudal fin, or tail (hence the name), a blue-green dorsal color, a silver side and belly, and a bronze/yellowy color, dividing the dark and light coloring along its lateral line. The average yellowtail ranges from 50 to 120 cm (20 to 47 in), but one of the largest ever observed was estimated to be over 155 cm (5.09 ft). The average weight of a California yellowtail is 12 to 18 lb (5.4 to 8.2 kg), although the largest caught was weighed to be 80 lb (36.3 kg). It is unknown if this heaviest caught individual is the same individual as the longest individual observed, which is mentioned above.

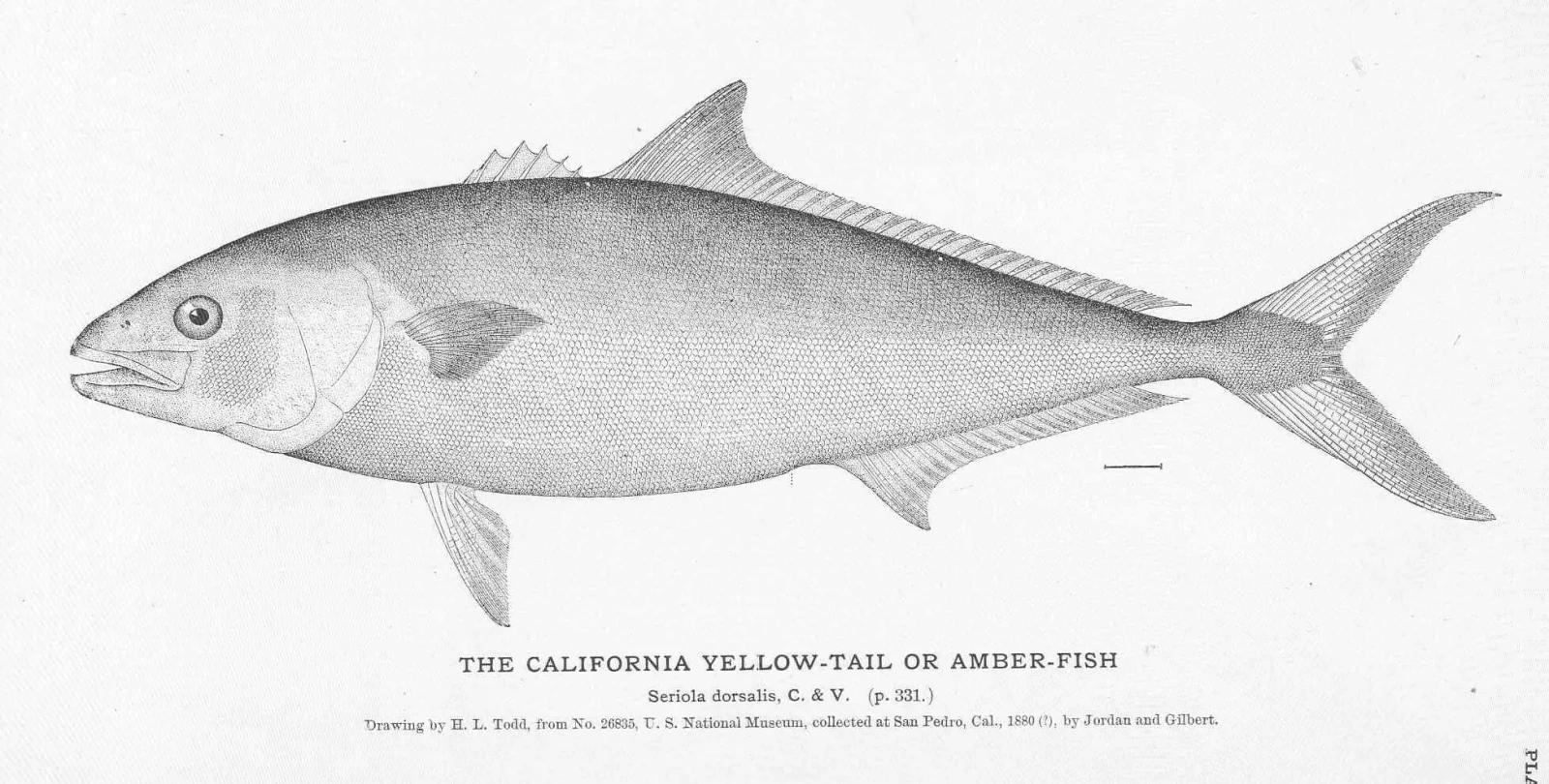
Drawing of California yellowtail, clearly showing its 2 dorsal fins, 1 pectoral fin, 1 pelvic fin, its anal fin and its caudal fin.

The pectoral fins on the California yellowtail are pointed, narrow, and long enough to provide steering while at high speed, but without adding too much drag. Just below the pectoral fins are the pelvic fins, which are relatively small, indicating little need for stabilization and balance. They have two dorsal fins, the first shorter and smaller than the second. The first originates behind the origin of the pectoral and has three to seven spines, and the second is located right behind the first. The caudal fin, or tail, lies directly behind the second dorsal and is deep forked, with lobes of equal size and short length. The shape of the yellowtail's tail is ideal for its fast and long-distance travel swimming needs, as it is streamlined and propels the fish forward. The California yellowtail, like most other fish, has a lateral line that gives the fish an awareness of its surroundings in the water, allowing it to sense water movement nearby. It runs above the pectoral fin and along the length of the body to the posterior end of the fish, consisting of 114 to 162 pored scales.

The California yellowtail has both white and red skeletal muscles, which is representative of both slow and fast twitch muscle structures. Red muscle is slow twitch and in the California yellowtail the red muscle is concentrated in the posterior end of the fish, close to the caudal fin, and along its lateral line. The red muscle is used for slow prolonged swimming, while the rest of the fish's muscle is white muscle, which is used for rapid speeding up in case of attacking prey or escaping from predators.

== Range ==
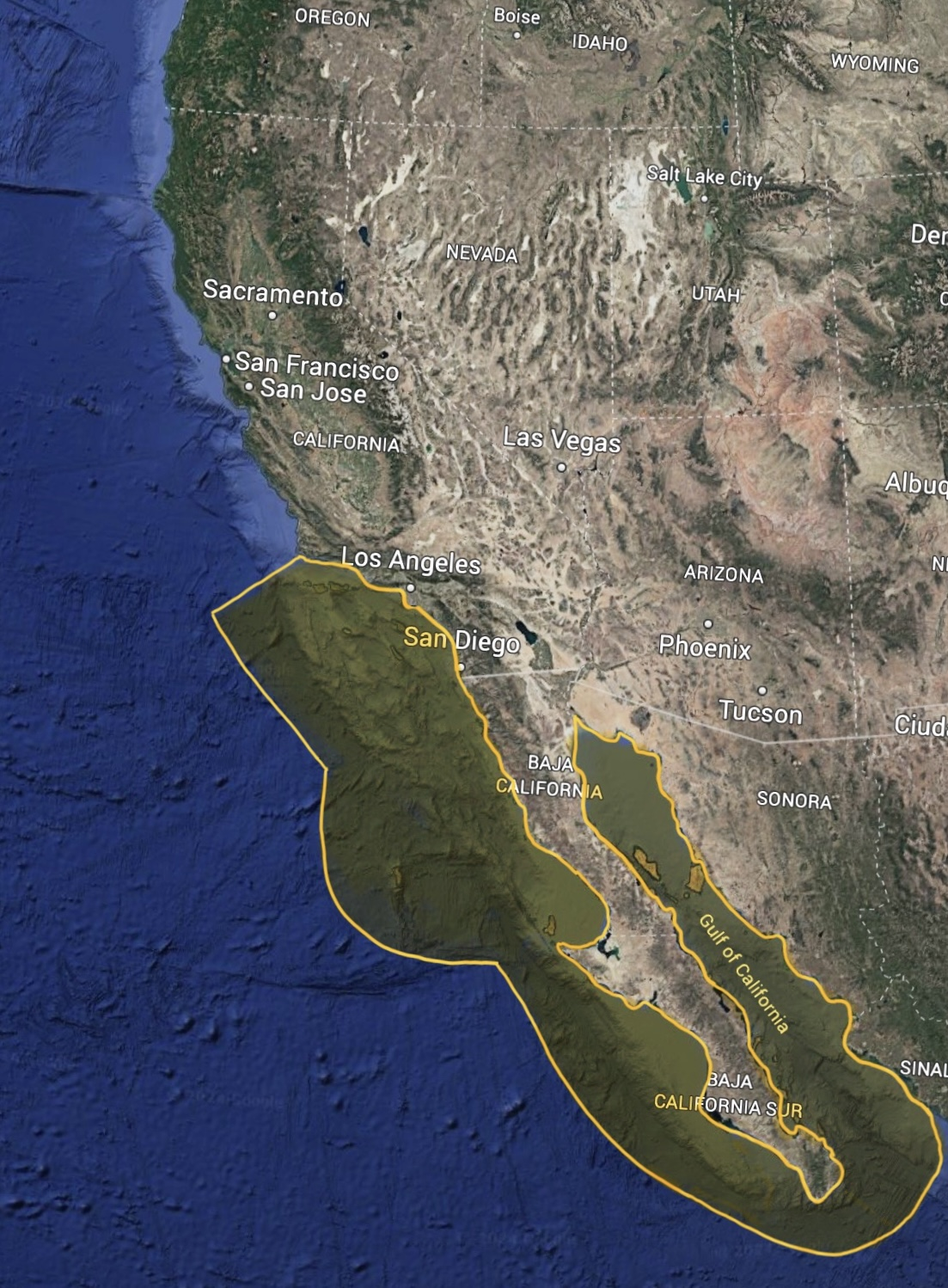
Map indicating the range of the California yellowtail, which is from Point Conception in California (northern limit), to Cabo San Lucas in Baja California (southern limit).

The California yellowtail's range is along the western coast of North America. Their range spans from Point Conception, the northern limit of the Southern California Bight in California, to Cabo San Lucas in Baja California Sur, or the southern tip of Baja, Mexico, and are believed to migrate north in the summer when the waters are warm. Populating areas such as Catalina Island, San Clemente Island, and Santa Monica Bay; the Baja California Peninsula and the Gulf of California, congregating at certain areas in mass numbers like Cedros Island and Benitos Island. During the summer they can also be found in association with floating kelp paddies off the coast of southern California and Baja California. While Seriola dorsalis is limited to the range above, other members of the genus Seriola have also been found in waters off South Africa, the Walter Shoals, Amsterdam Island, Japan, Australia, New Zealand, New Caledonia, Hawaii, Rapa, Pitcairn Island, Jeju Island, and Easter Island. In the Eastern Pacific, they can be found in waters off British Columbia, south to Chile.

== Habitat ==
The California yellowtail is known to have a range of habitats, as they are both nearshore and pelagic. The California yellowtail can be found in the shallows, feeding on the edges of rocky points or in kelp forests, and is typically found just below the surface. Differences in habitat have been found based on the life history and size of the fish, smaller fish are more prevalent offshore, and were also found to travel farther offshore than large individuals found nearshore. Nearshore habitats are usually associated with kelp beds, where California yellowtails are also known to spawn and attach their eggs to the kelp.

== Diet ==
The California yellowtail is a predator along the California coast that holds a high trophic position. The California yellowtail is a non-discriminatory carnivore and feeds on a range of foods. Their diet consists of mackerel, sardines, anchovies, squid, crab, and smelts. Often, California yellowtail are found in schools feeding at the surface of the water, as well as deeper. They prefer water temperatures of 21–22 °C (70–72 °F), although they have also been found in waters between 18 and 24 °C (64 and 75 °F). Temperatures cooler than 18 °C (64 °F) would make the yellowtail sink into deeper waters to conserve energy. The California yellowtail is known to feed more heavily in the warmer months.

== Reproduction ==
Most knowledge of California yellowtail reproduction comes from aquaculture and other captive individuals. They are aggregate broadcast spawners, meaning they reproduce by releasing their gametes into the water column. Spawning and reproduction occur during the spring and summer months, between March and September.

== Aquaculture ==
The California yellowtail aquaculture industry is currently dependent on the capturing of young individuals. However, data shows rearing in captivity may be beneficial, as both swimming and metabolic physiology could be improved through aquaculture rearing and reproduction. The demand for California yellowtail is growing as a resource, being a desirable restaurant dish, pushing the need for aquaculture. Species of Seriola have been grown in aquaculture around the world for decades and will likely soon develop on the west coast of the United States. This fish is prime for aquaculture as sexual maturity is reached early in their lives, between 2 and 3 years. Quick maturity is ideal for aquaculture, as it allows rapid population growth since it does not take long for individuals to reproduce.

== Fishing ==
Seriola dorsalis is a highly popular game fish that is caught with live bait on hook and line for both recreation and sports fishing. The recreational catch is often found to be much higher than the commercial catch, according to reports on the NOAA fisheries website. In 2021, the total commercial catch was 39,291 lbs., while the recreational catch was 209,131 lbs. In 2022, the total commercial catch was 24,100 lbs., while the recreational catch was 144,385 lbs. Most locally caught California yellowtails are typically 10-20 lbs and are around 3–7 years old. However, there is a large market for this pelagic fish with both white and red muscle, as it is sold for a high price in domestic restaurants. The California yellowtail is often caught in the Southern California Bight, a region including the southern California coast and the area of ocean stretching from Point Conception to San Diego. This fish is frequently caught near the islands of Santa Catalina, Clemente, the Coronado Islands, and off the coast of La Jolla in San Diego. The early evening, as the sun is setting, is a common time to catch the California yellowtail, as they feed during that time when the light is low.

== Management and Conservation status ==
According to the California Department of Fish and Wildlife, there is currently no management plan for the California yellowtail, although there are measures in place to prevent overexploitation of the species such as catch limits. This fish is listed as "least concern" by the IUCN, on the basis that "significant global population declines have not been reported and are not suspected. Its range coincides with numerous marine protected areas."
