= Epinephelus flavocaeruleus =

- In Mauritius

Conservation status
- Least Concern (IUCN 3.1)

Scientific classification
- Kingdom: Animalia
- Phylum: Chordata
- Class: Actinopterygii
- Division: Teleostei
- Order: Perciformes
- Family: Epinephelidae
- Genus: Epinephelus
- Species: E. flavocaeruleus

Binomial name
- Epinephelus flavocaeruleus (Lacépède, 1802)

Synonyms
- List: Holocentrus flavocaeruleus Lacepède, 1802; Epinephelus flavo-caeruleus (Lacepède, 1802); Serranus flavocaeruleus (Lacepède, 1802); Bodianus macrocephalus Lacepède, 1802; Holocentrus gymnosus Lacepède, 1802; Holocentrus caerulescens Shaw, 1803; Serranus borbonicus Quoy & Gaimard, 1824; Perca flavopurpurea Bennett, 1830

Species of fish

Epinephelus flavocaeruleus, commonly called blue-and-yellow grouper, is a species of marine ray-finned fish, a grouper of the family Epinephelidae. It is associated with reefs in the Indian Ocean.

== Taxonomy ==
Epinephelus flavocaeruleus was first formally described as Holocentrus flavocaeruleus in 1802 by the French naturalist Bernard Germain de Lacépède (1756-1825) with the type locality given as Mauritius.

== Distribution ==
Epinephelus flavocaeruleus is widespread throughout the tropical waters of the Indian Ocean. Along the eastern coast of Africa from Djibouti to Port Alfred east to Sumatra. It has been recorded around St Brandon and Rodrigues in the Mascarenes and as far north as the Gulf of Mannar in India. Although it is found in the Gulf of Aden it is absent from the Red Sea and the Persian Gulf.

== Description ==
Epinephelus flavocaeruleus is a middle sized fish, it can grow up to a maximum length of 90 cm but average size is usually around 45 cm. It has a deep and compressed body, the standard length being 2.3 to 2.7 times its depth. The preopercle is subangular with enlarged serrations at its angle. The upper edge of the gill cover is straight or slightly convex. The dorsal fin contains 9 spines and 16-17 soft rays while the anal fin has 3 spines and 8 soft rays, there are no incisions in the membranes between the dorsal fin spines. The caudal fin is truncate. The head and body are dark bluish violet to dark greyish blue, there are sometimes pale blue flecks while the fins and jaws are bright yellow> In some fish the corners of caudal fin, the margin of the soft-rayed part of the dorsal and the anal fins as well as the tips of pelvic fins are blackish. The yellow colour fades as the fish grows and the larger adults are normally dark greyish, dark blue, purple, reddish brown, or nearly black.

== Habitat and biology ==
Epinephelus flavocaeruleus is solitary and sedentary, defending a well bounded territory. The juveniles are found in shallow reefs whereas the adults occur on deeper reefs to 150 metres (490 ft) This predatory species feeds on fishes, crabs, shrimps, spiny lobsters, squids, and small octopuses.

== Utilisation ==
Epinephelus flavocaeruleus is landed on Réunion as part of the mixed grouper fishery there. In the Maldives, it is captured for export to the Hong Kong live reef fish market.
