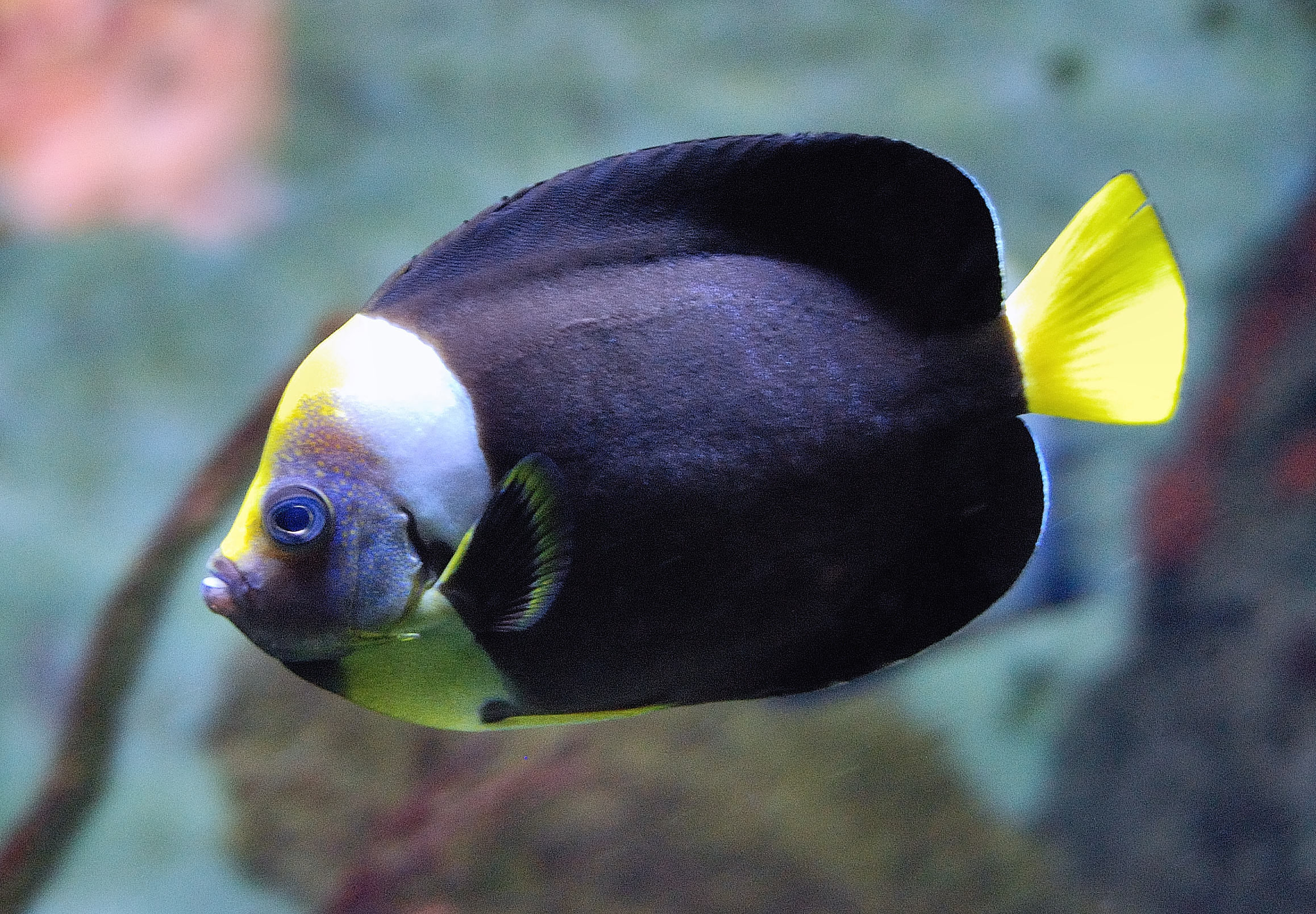

Conservation status
- Least Concern (IUCN 3.1)

Scientific classification
- Kingdom: Animalia
- Phylum: Chordata
- Class: Actinopterygii
- Order: Acanthuriformes
- Family: Pomacanthidae
- Genus: Chaetodontoplus
- Species: C. meridithii

Binomial name
- Chaetodontoplus meridithii Kuiter, 1989

= Chaetodontoplus meridithii =

Species of fish

Chaetodontoplus meridithii, the Queensland yellowtail angelfish, Meredith's angelfish or yellow-finned angelfish, yellowtail angelfish, is a species of marine ray-finned fish, a marine angelfish belonging to the family Pomacanthidae. It is found off eastern Australia.

== Description ==
Chaetodontoplus meridithii has a black body with a bluish-grey to blue face marked with yellow spots. There is a white band behind the head., The forehead is yellow and there is another yellow patch on the chest. The pectoral fins are largely black with yellowish margins, and the caudal fin is yellow. The dorsal and anal fins have yellowish to blue margins. The dorsal fin contains 13 spines and 17–19 soft rays while the anal fin contains 3 spines and 17–19 soft rays. This species attains a maximum total length of 25 centimetres (9.8 in).

== Distribution ==
Chaetodontoplus meridithii is endemic to eastern Australia. The range of this species extends from Cape York in Queensland south as far as Sydney. It also occurs around Lord Howe Island in the Tasman Sea.

== Habitat and biology ==
Chaetodontoplus meridithii is found at depths of 10 to 50 metres (33 to 164 ft) on coastal reefs and open areas which have substrates of rock, coral, sponge, or outcrops of sea whips. The juveniles prefer shallower waters than the adults and they are often found among sponges under jetties. The adults are mainly encountered in pairs but sometimes they are solitary, generally in deeper waters at depths greater than 30 metres (98 ft). They feed on sponges and tunicates.

== Systematics ==
Chaetodontoplus meridithii was first formally described in 1989 by the Netherlands-born Australian underwater photographer, taxonomist, marine biologist Rudie Hermann Kuiter with the type locality given as the Pilot Station in Port Jackson. The specific name honours the collector of the type, the aquarist and dive instructor John G. Meredith.

== Utilisation ==
Chaetodontoplus meridithii makes an occasional appearance in the aquarium trade.
