= Sardinella rouxi =

Yellowtail sardinella

Scientific classification
- Kingdom: Animalia
- Phylum: Chordata
- Class: Actinopterygii
- Order: Clupeiformes
- Family: Dorosomatidae
- Genus: Sardinella
- Species: S. rouxi

Binomial name
- Sardinella rouxi (Poll, 1953)

Species of fish

Sardinella rouxi (yellowtail sardinella) is a species of ray-finned fish in the genus Sardinella.

== Footnotes ==
- Froese, Rainer; Pauly, Daniel (eds.). "Sardinella rouxi". FishBase.
