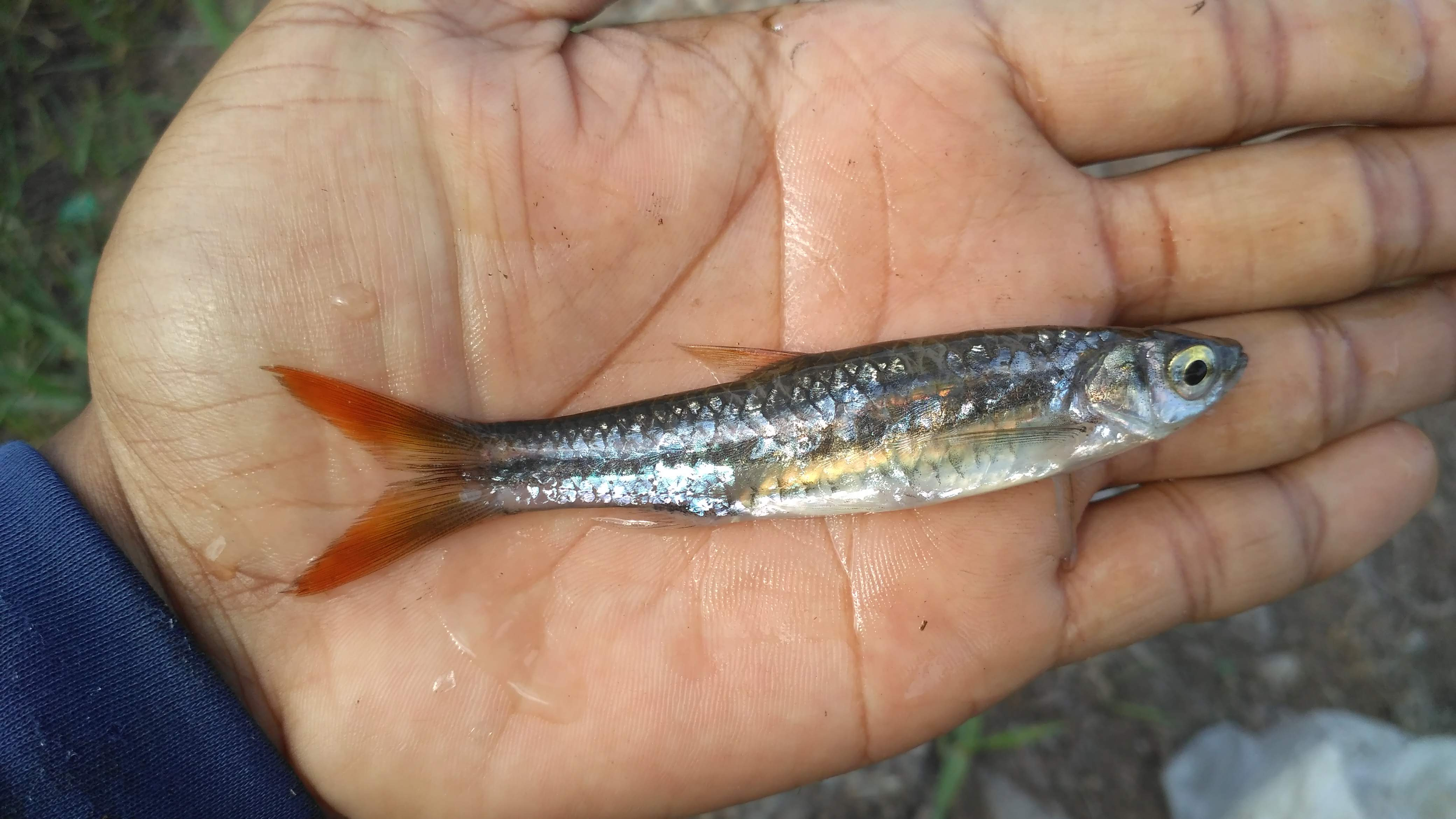

Conservation status
- Least Concern (IUCN 3.1)

Scientific classification
- Kingdom: Animalia
- Phylum: Chordata
- Class: Actinopterygii
- Order: Cypriniformes
- Family: Danionidae
- Subfamily: Rasborinae
- Genus: Rasbora
- Species: R. tornieri

Binomial name
- Rasbora tornieri C. G. E. Ahl, 1922

= Yellowtail rasbora =

Species of fish

The yellowtail rasbora (Rasbora tornieri) is a species of freshwater ray-finned fish in the genus Rasbora from mainland south-east Asia.
