= Pseudochromis linda =

Conservation status
- Least Concern (IUCN 3.1)

Scientific classification
- Kingdom: Animalia
- Phylum: Chordata
- Class: Actinopterygii
- Order: Blenniiformes
- Family: Pseudochromidae
- Genus: Pseudochromis
- Species: P. linda

Binomial name
- Pseudochromis linda J. E. Randall & Stanaland, 1989

Species of fish

Pseudochromis linda, the yellowtail dottyback, is a species of ray-finned fish in the family Pseudochromidae. It is found in the western Indian Ocean.

== Description ==
Pseudochromis linda reaches a standard length of 8.1 cm (3.2 in).
