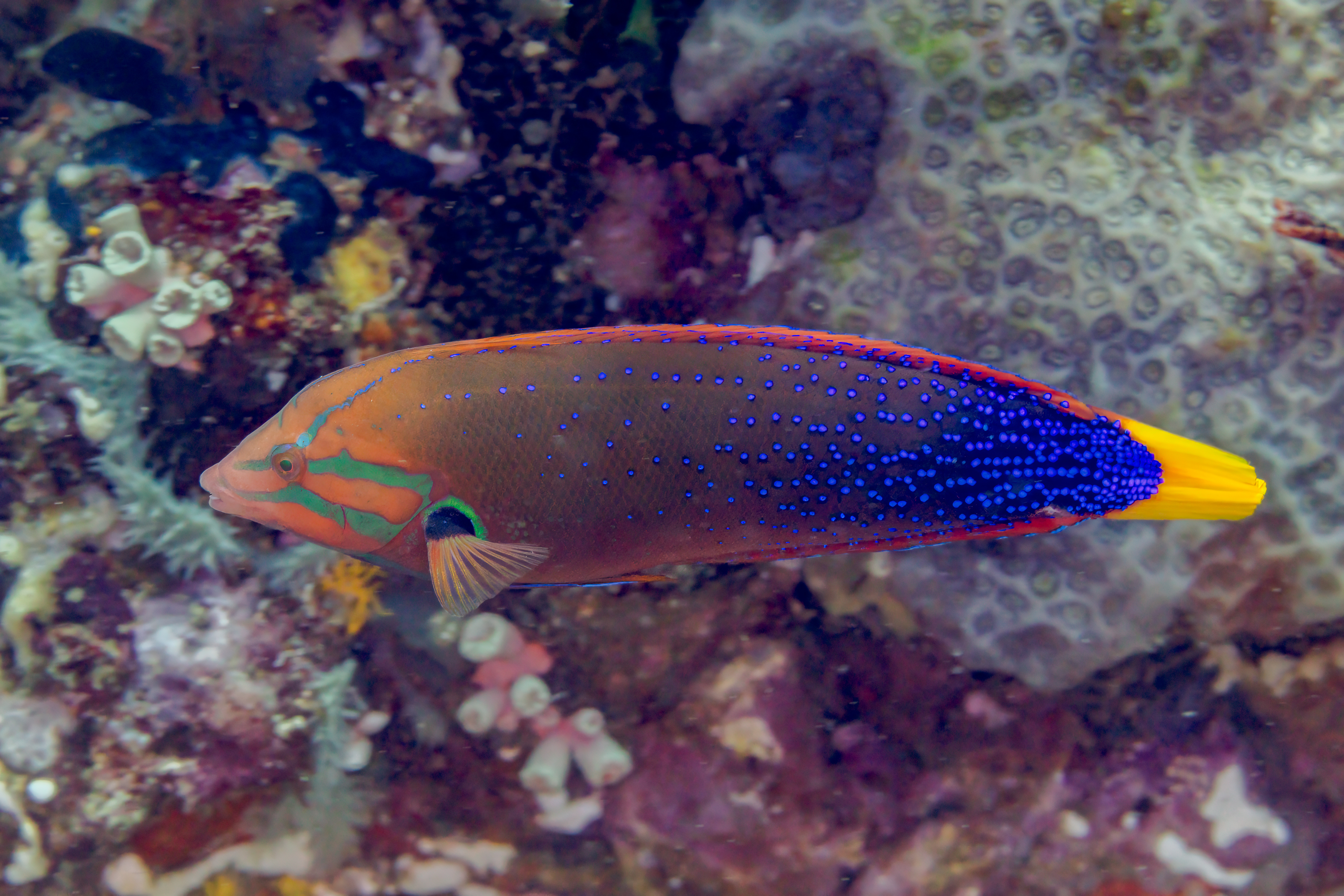
- Initial phase (female)
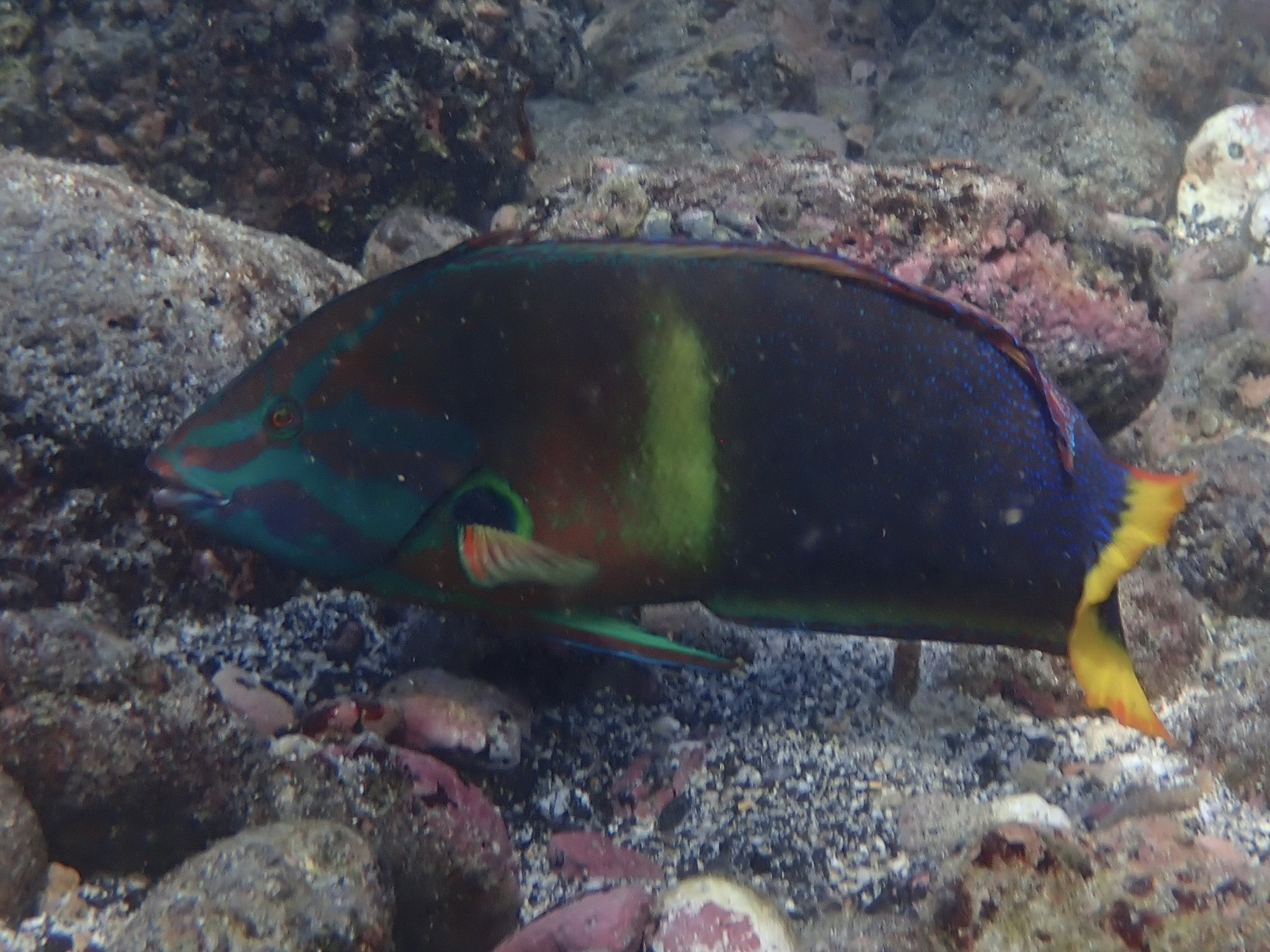
- Terminal phase (male)

Conservation status
- Least Concern (IUCN 3.1)

Scientific classification
- Kingdom: Animalia
- Phylum: Chordata
- Class: Actinopterygii
- Order: Labriformes
- Family: Labridae
- Genus: Coris
- Species: C. gaimard

Binomial name
- Coris gaimard (Quoy & Gaimard, 1824)

Synonyms
- List: Julis gaimard Quoy & Gaimard, 1824; Coris gaimard gaimard (Quoy & Gaimard, 1824); Julis greenovii E. T. Bennett, 1828; Coris greenovii (E. T. Bennett, 1828); Julis ganymede J. W. Bennett, 1830; Julis leucorhynchos Bleeker, 1856; Coris pulcherrima Günther, 1862; Julis gaimard speciosa Fowler, 1946; Coris gaimard speciosa (Fowler, 1946)

= Coris gaimard =

Species of fish

Coris gaimard, the yellowtail wrasse or African coris, among other vernacular names, is a species of wrasse native to the tropical waters of the central Indian Ocean and the western Pacific Ocean, from Christmas Islands and Cocos Keeling Islands to the Society Islands, Hawaii, and from Japan to Australia. It is an inhabitant of coral reefs, being found in areas that offer a mix of sand patches, rubble, and coral at depths from 1 to 50 m (3.3 to 164.0 ft). This species can also be found in the aquarium trade and is popular species for display in public aquaria.

== Description ==
This species can reach 40 cm (16 in) in total length, though most do not exceed 20 cm (7.9 in). As a juvenile, it is a bright red colour with large, black-margined white spots. As an adult, it has a pink face and fins, with the exception of the tail fin, which is bright yellow. The body is green towards the anterior darkening and decorated with bright blue specks towards the caudal peduncle. The fish also gains a very bright orange anterior when it grows into adulthood, and has a drastically shaded body in the posterior region that is dotted with very bright blue spots ringed with dark blue.

Growth series

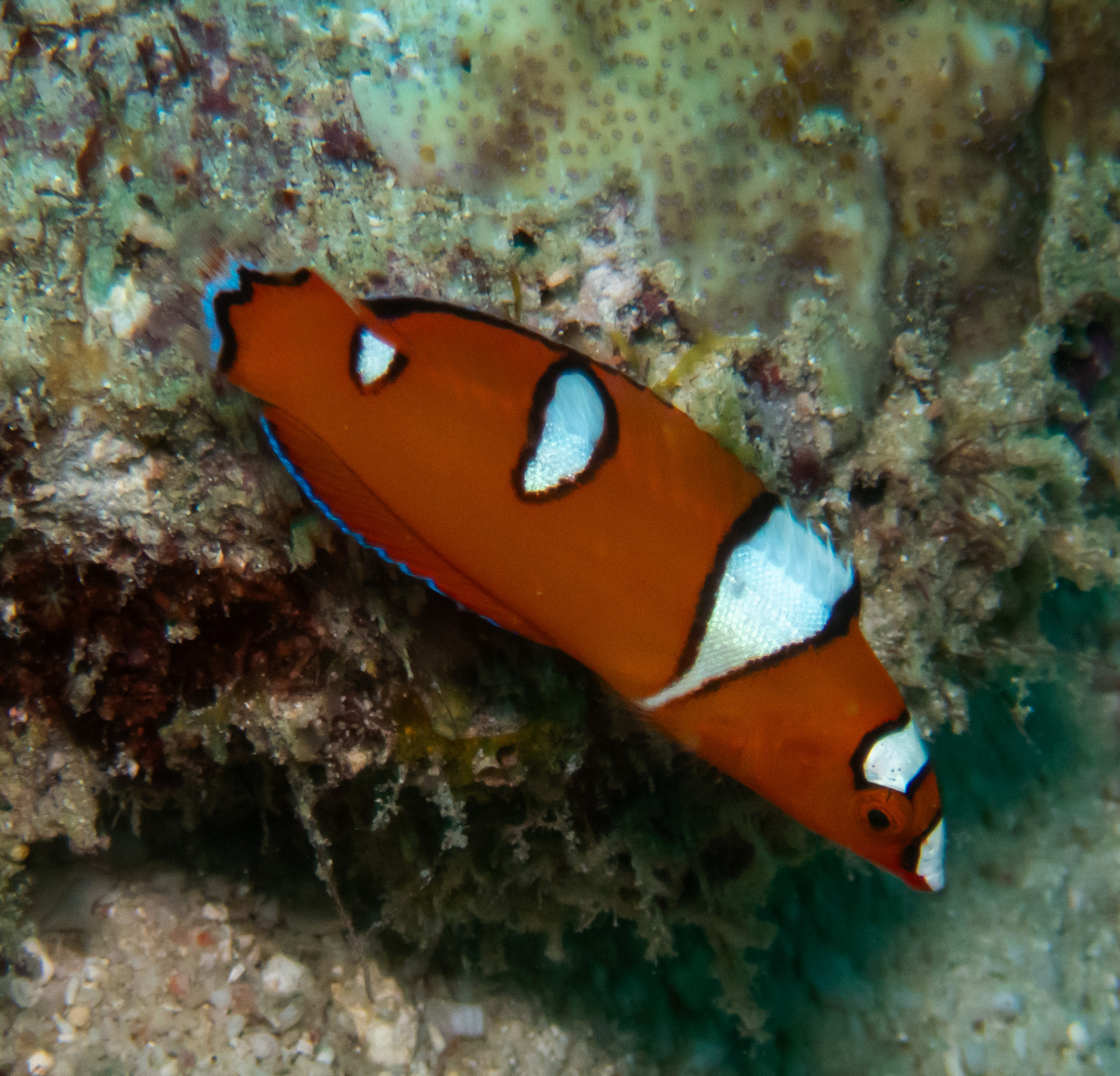
Juvenile

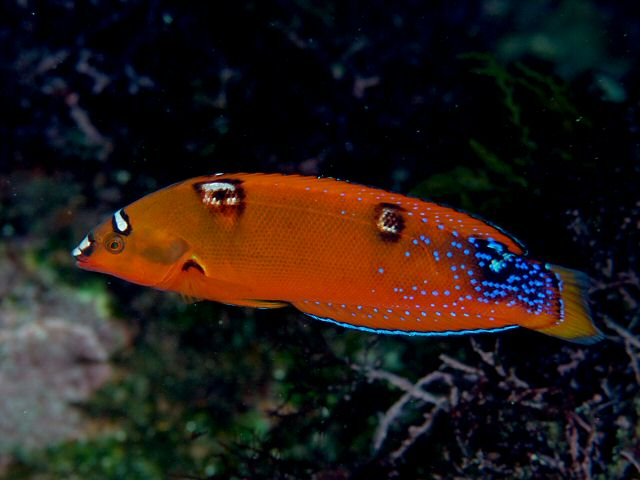
Older juvenile

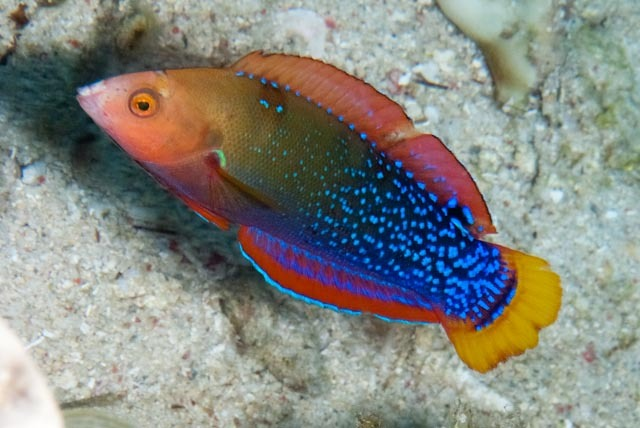
Young female

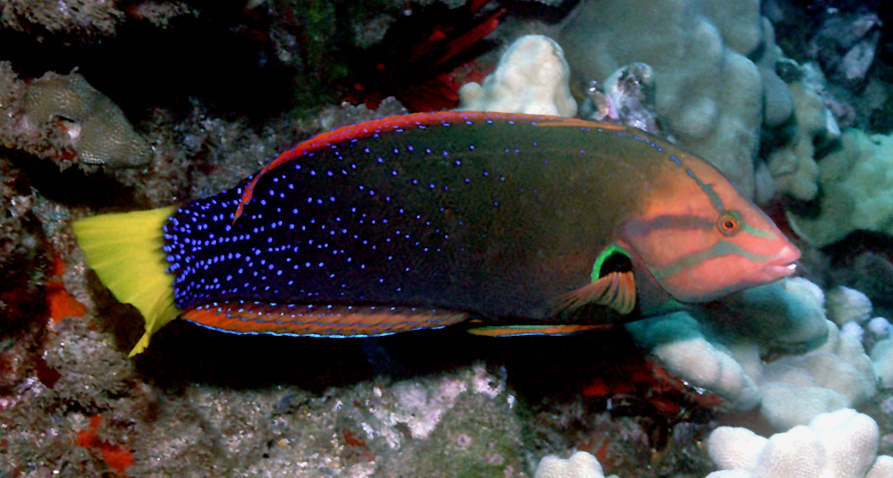
Older female

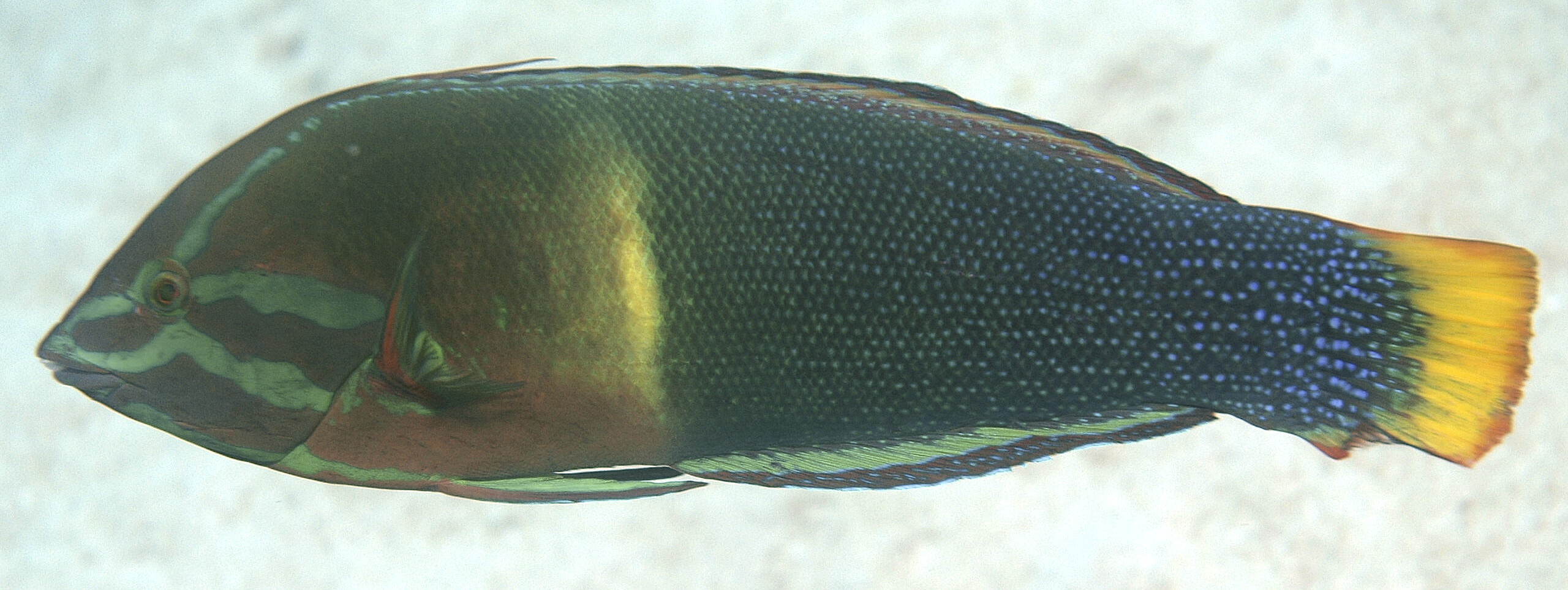
Male (terminal phase)

== Gallery ==
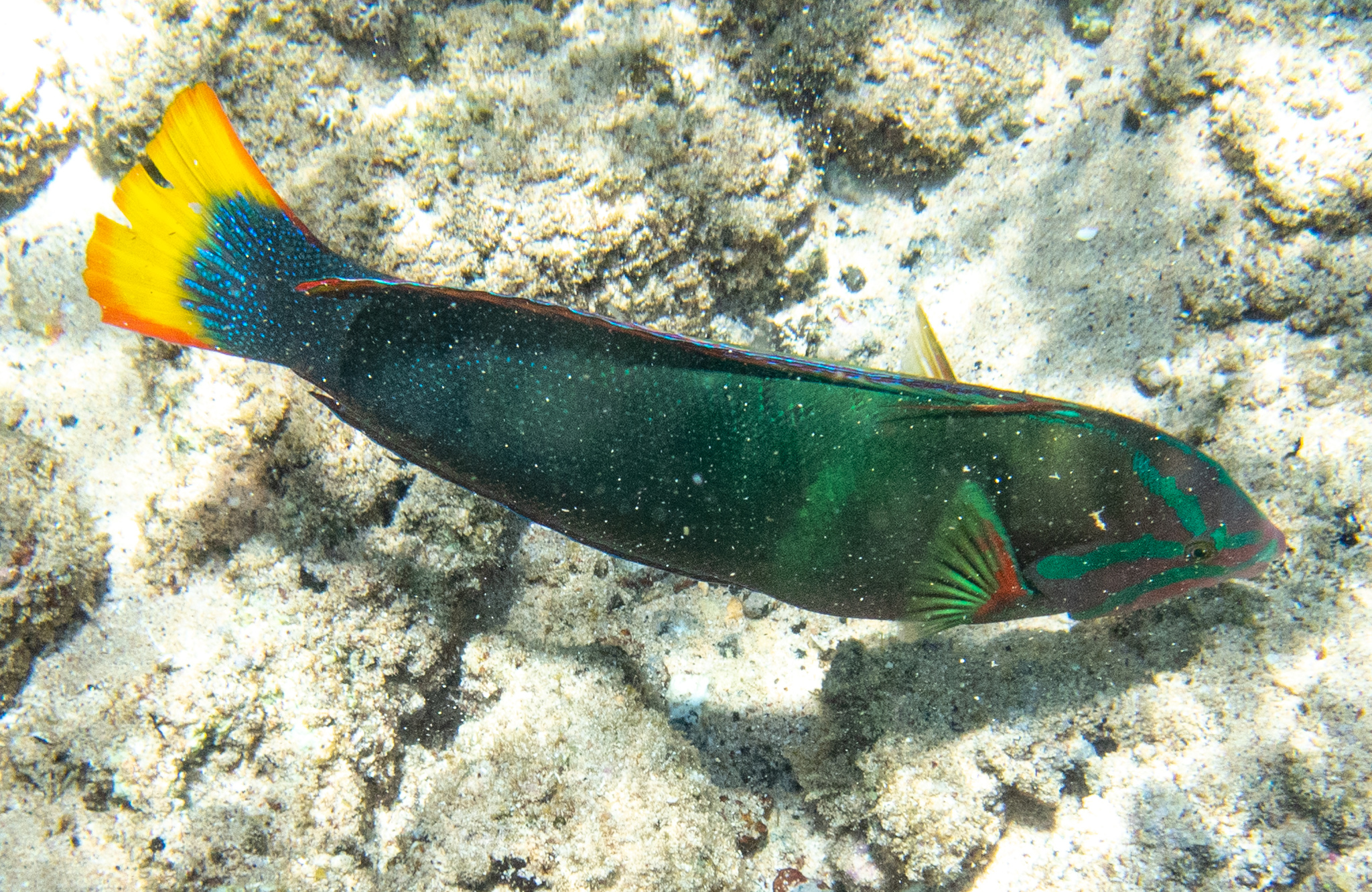
Male (terminal phase)

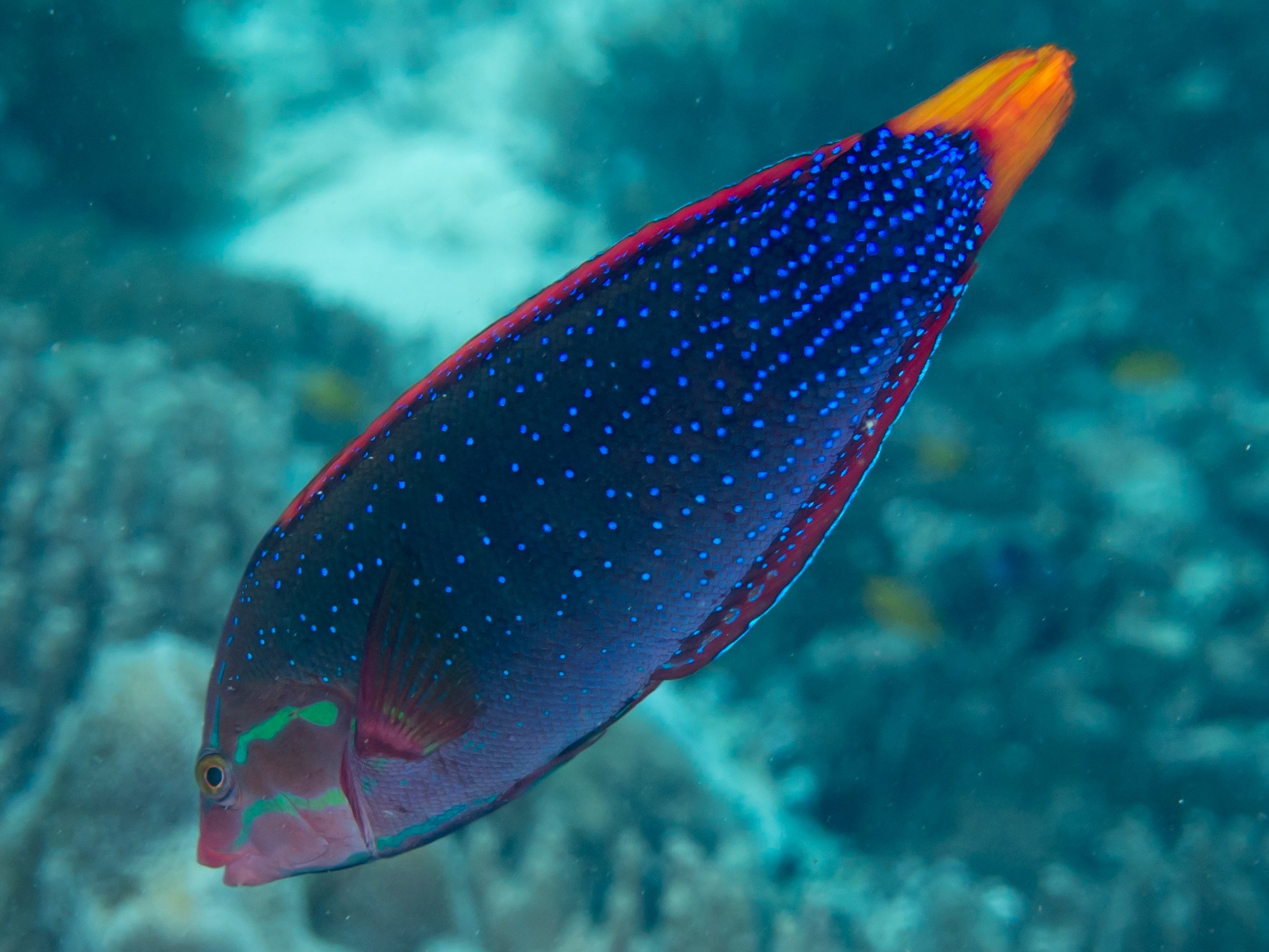
Female

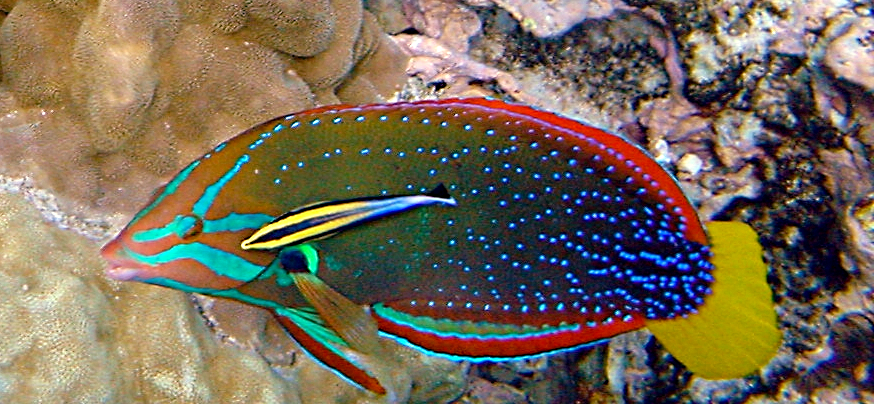
Female being cleaned by a Hawaiian cleaner wrasse

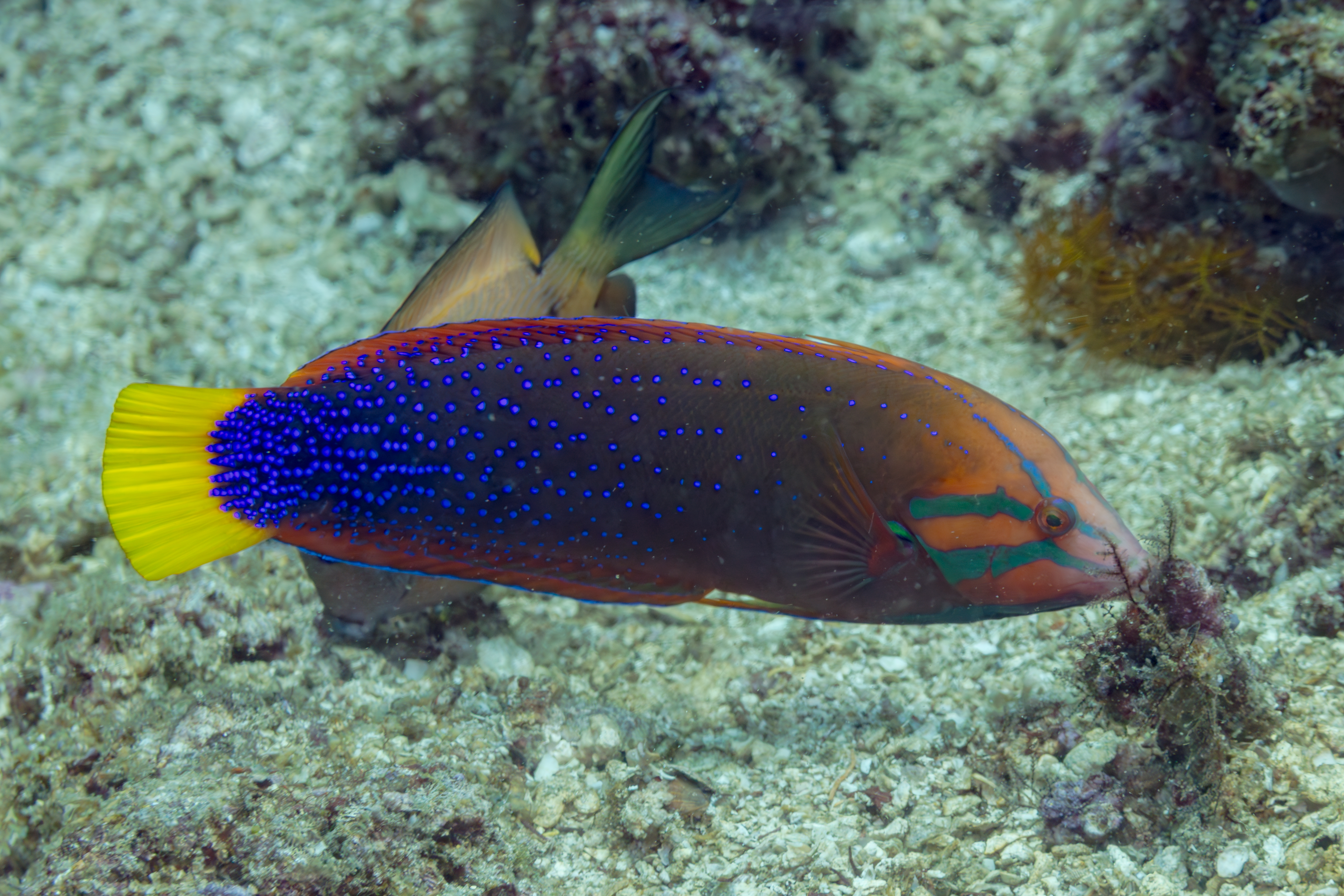
Female

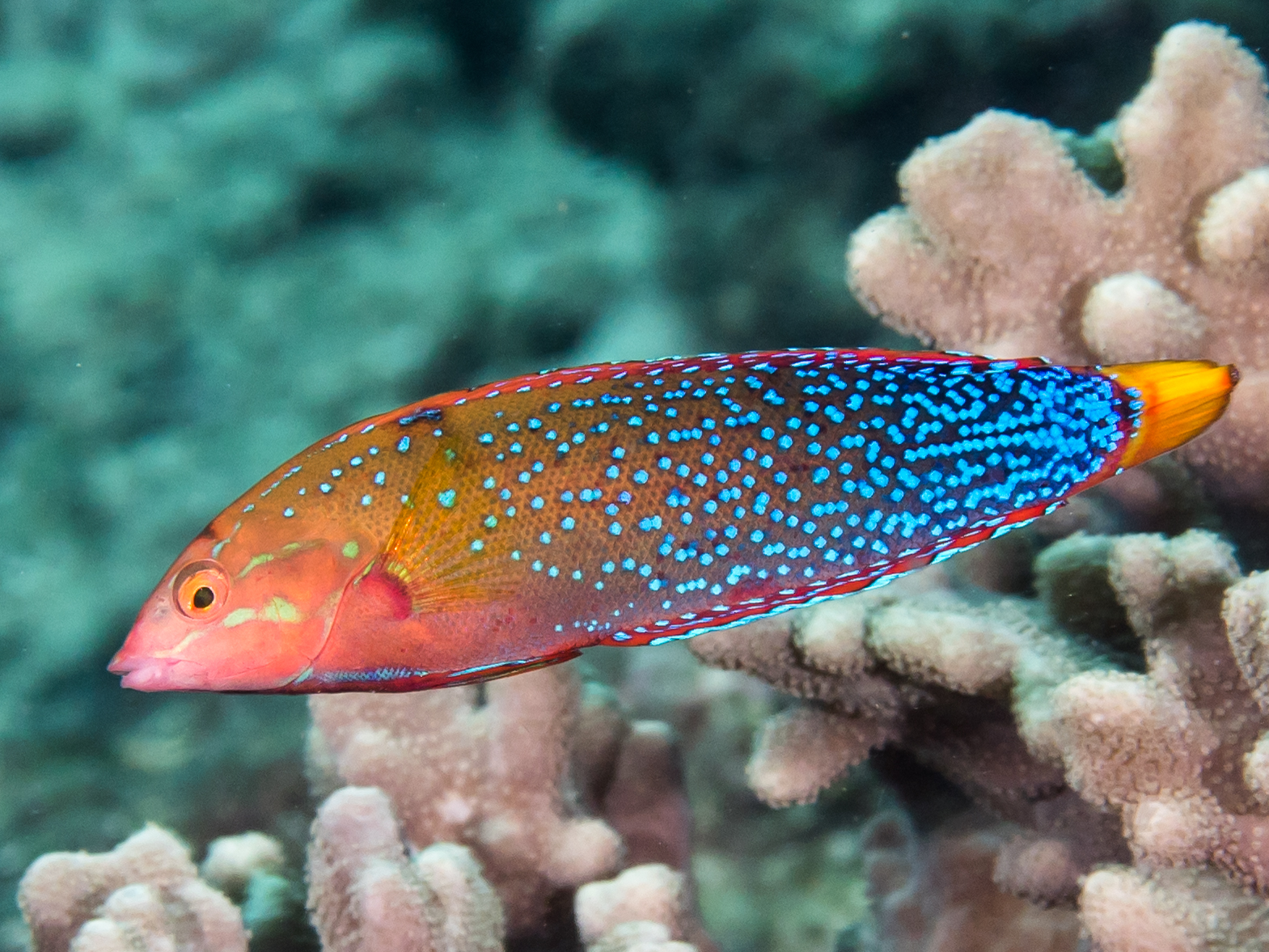
Female

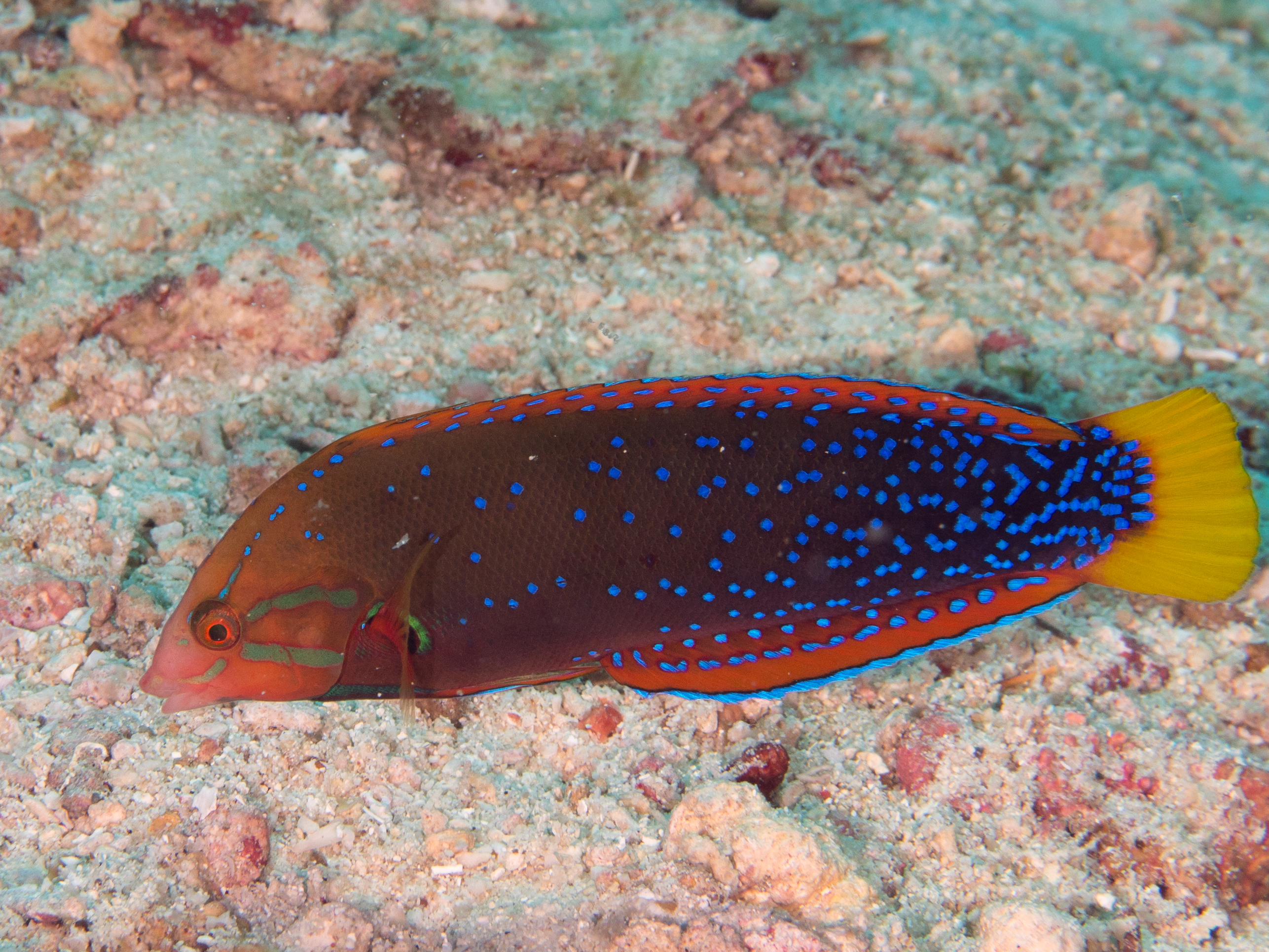
Female

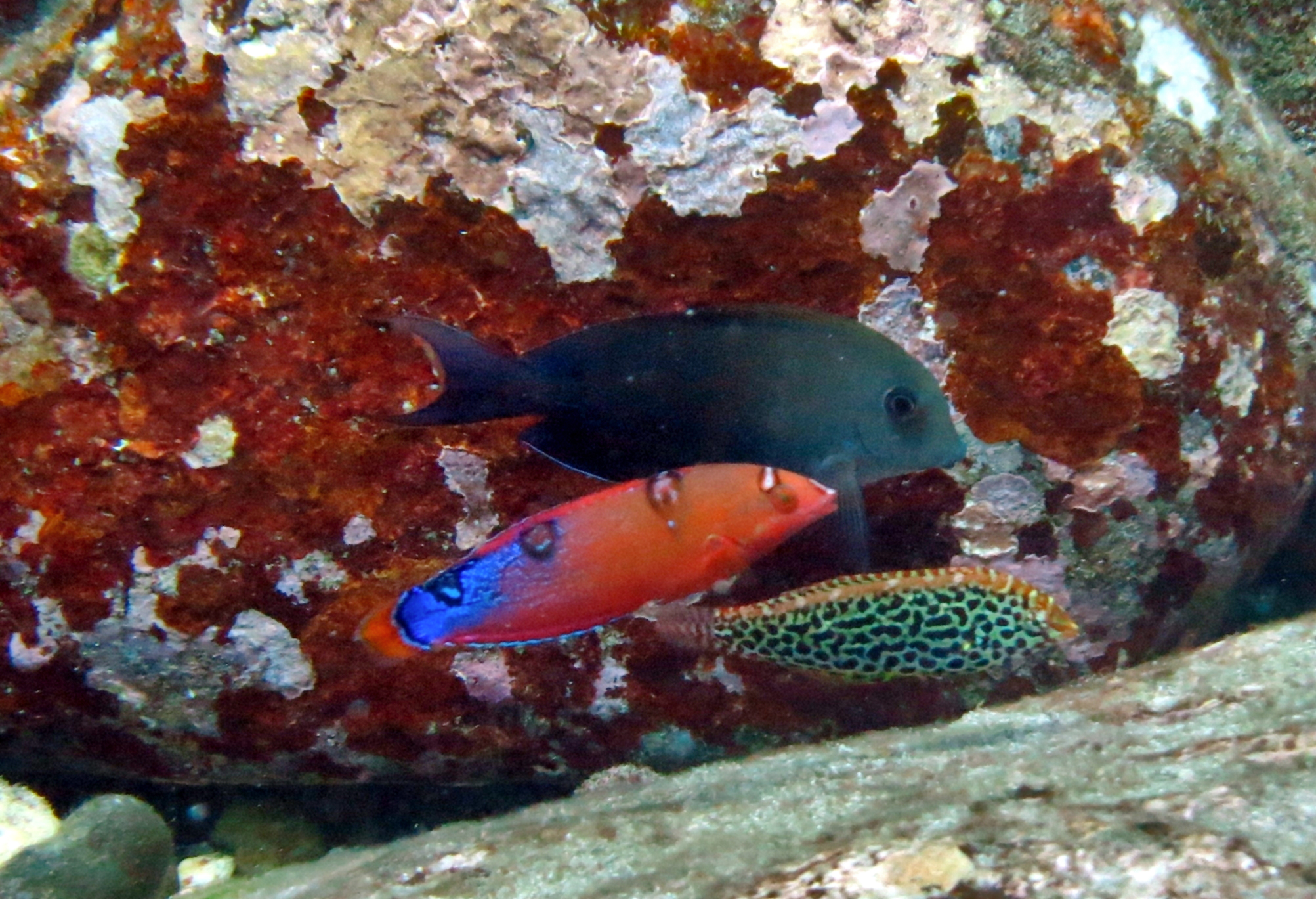
Juvenile
