= Rosais Islets =

Islets in the Azores, Portugal

Native name: Ilhéus dos Rosais
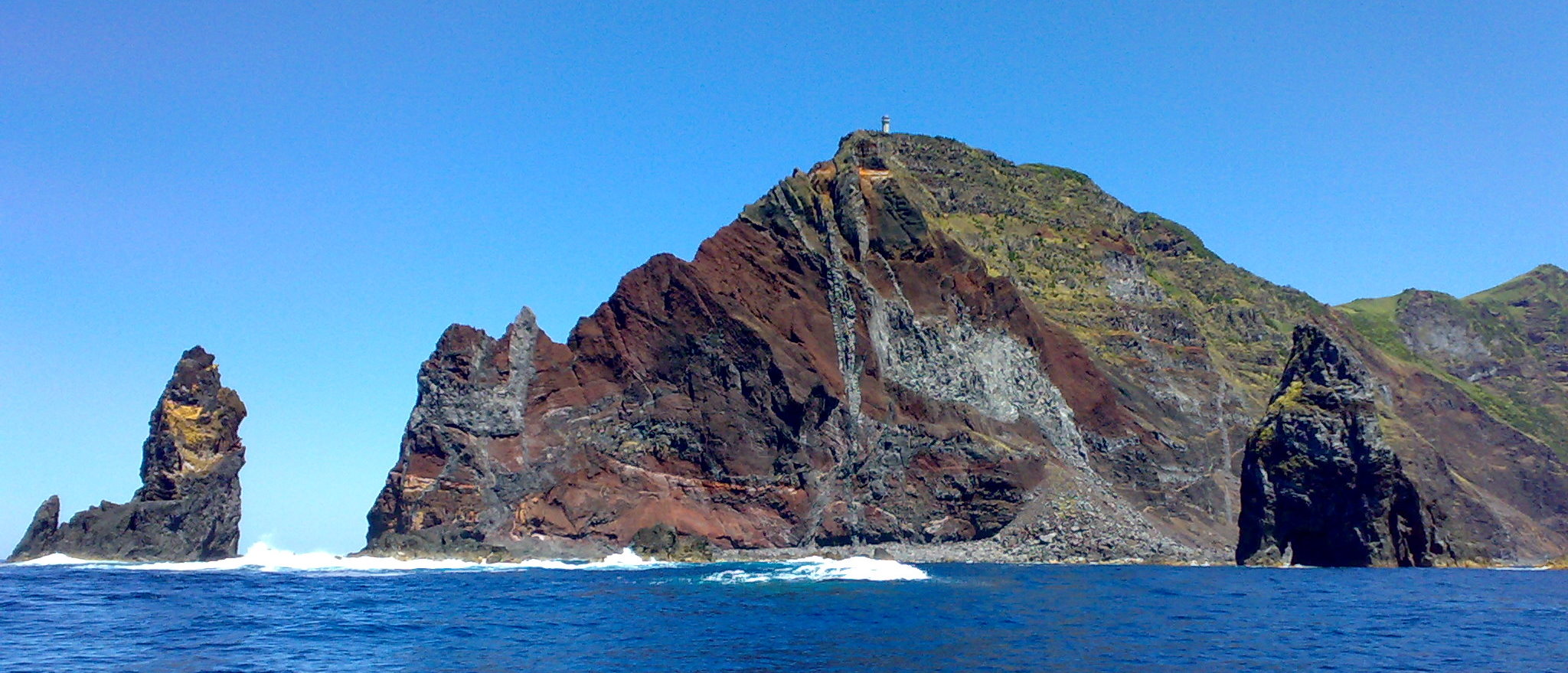
- The islets seen from the southwest on the ocean, with São Jorge and the Ponta dos Rosais Lighthouse visible in the background

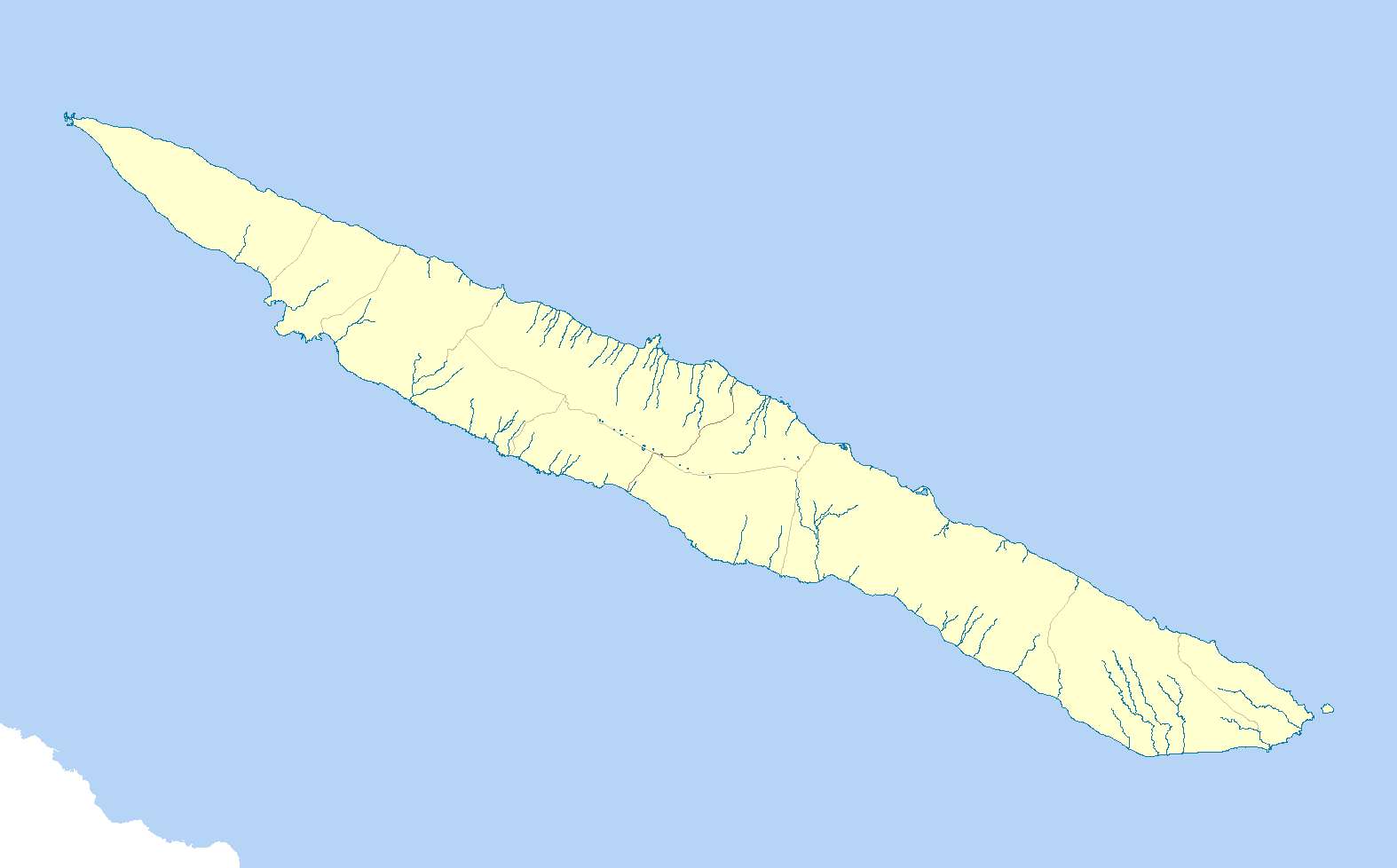
- Location of the islets off the coast of São Jorge
- Etymology: Rosais is the settlement closest to the islets; the word "rosais" is archaic Portuguese for "rosaries"

Geography
- Location: Atlantic Ocean
- Coordinates: 38°45′22″N 28°19′01″W

Administration
- Portugal
- Autonomous region: Azores

Demographics
- Population: uninhabited

The Rosais Islets (Portuguese: Ilhéus dos Rosais; literally, Islets of the Rosaries) are two uninhabited rocky islets located just off the extreme northwestern coast of the island of São Jorge in the Portuguese archipelago of the Azores.

== Geography ==
The Rosais Islets are two small, basaltic volcanic stacks located immediately off Ponta dos Rosais, the extreme northwestern point of São Jorge. The islets arise from an oceanic plateau called Baixa da Ponta dos Rosais, which itself is part of the Terceira Rift. Rosais, a civil parish within the larger municipality of Velas, is the settlement nearest the islets.

=== Biome ===
The waters around the Rosais Islets and Baixa da Ponta dos Rosais are biodiverse. They are home to various fish including anchovy, Atlantic bonito, Atlantic goliath grouper, bluefish, European hake, frigate tuna, longfin yellowtail, needlefish, red scorpionfish, sawfish, skipjack tuna, vadigo, and yellowmouth barracuda. Common bottlenose dolphins and loggerhead sea turtles also habitate the area. Aquatic plants growing around the Baixa include the brown alga Stypopodium zonale and the red alga Asparagopsis armata.

Marine birds including black-headed gull, common tern, Cory's shearwater, Eurasian whimbrel, great black-backed gull, Kentish plover, roseate tern, ruddy turnstone, and sanderling frequent the Ponta dos Rosais area and islets. The rocky islets are not completely bare above the water's surface, hosting terrestrial vegetation including the endemic flowering plants Azorean forget-me-not (Myosotis azorica) and Azorean heather (Erica azorica).

In recognition of their biodiversity, the islets and surrounding waters are part of the Monumento Natural da Ponta dos Rosais (Ponta dos Rosais Natural Monument), a 170.2-hectare (421-acre) nature reserve within the Nature Park of São Jorge, one of the locally protected areas of the Azores. Since June 1995 the islets—as part of the overall Ponta dos Rosais area—have been protected through the European Environment Agency's Natura 2000 initiative under the Habitats Directive.
