= Baixa da Ponta dos Rosais =

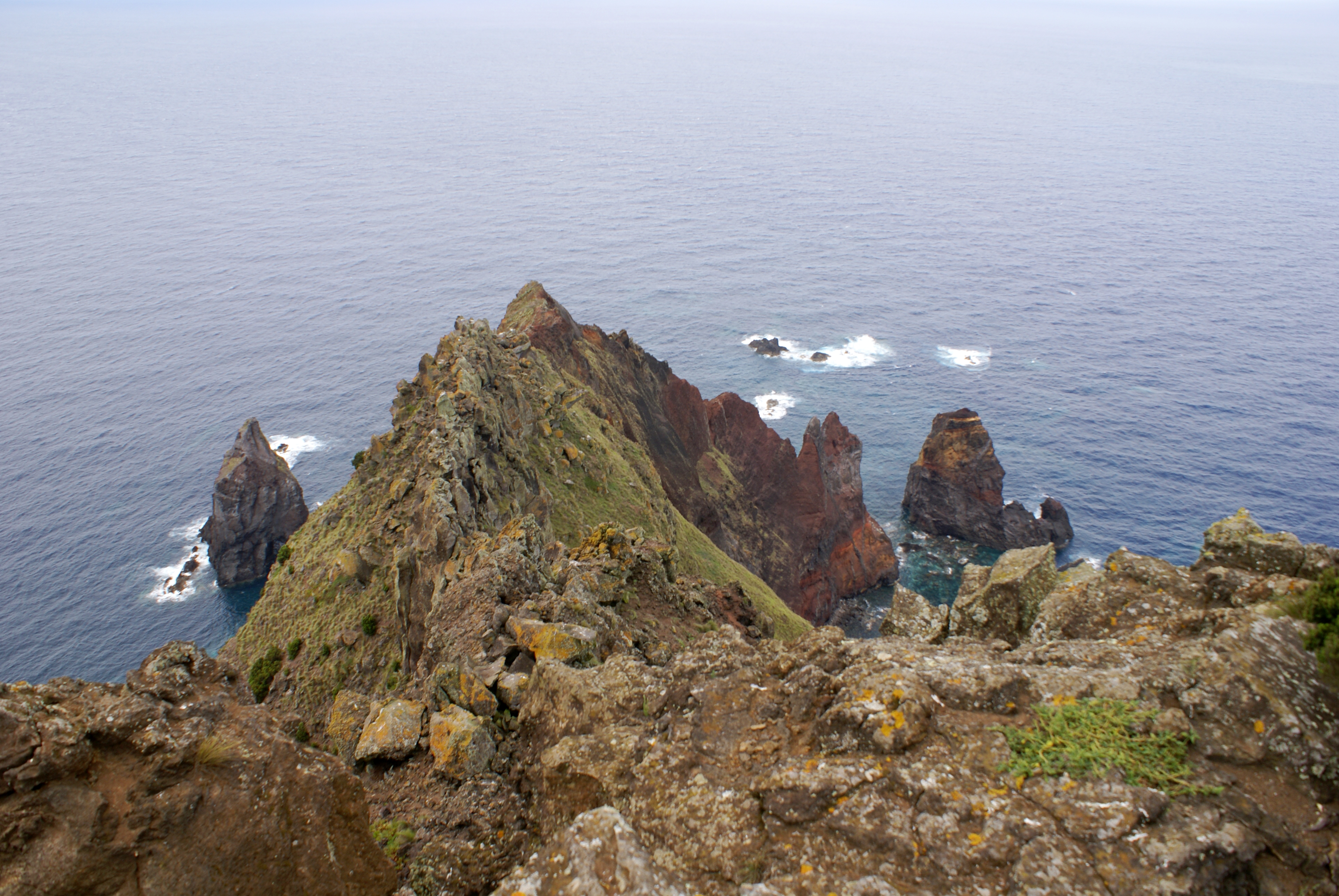
- A view at the edge of Ponta dos Rosias with the Rosais Islets visible to the left and right of the promontory; the Baixa is located some 3 miles (4.8 km) north of this point
- Etymology: Ponta dos Rosais

Location
- Country: Portugal
- Autonomous region: Azores
- Islands: Eastern Group

Basin features
- River system: Azores Plateau

The Baixa da Ponta dos Rosais is an oceanic plateau located north-northwest off the coast of Ponta dos Rosais, a promontory in the municipality of Velas on the island of São Jorge in the Portuguese archipelago of the Azores. It is located approximately 3 miles (4.8 km) from the coast and 10 miles (16 km) from the port of Velas. It is a popular destination for divers frequenting the Azores.

== Geography ==
As part of the northern civil parish of Rosais, Ponta dos Rosais is an extension of the north-northwest and south-southeast fissural formation of the island, along a fault system that extends from São Miguel to São Jorge, called the Terceira Rift. Effusive and explosive submarine eruptions across these fissural faults gave rise to the long, slender island of São Jorge. Oceanic plateaus extending into the ocean north and south of São Jorge resulted from these formative volcanic and seismic forces.

The Baixa is one of these plateaus made of submerged basalt cliffs created by fissural tectonics, with accentuated slopes aligned northwest to southeast from Ponta dos Rosais. Its location off the coast where open sea and currents meet means the area's diving conditions vary, being frequently turbulent.

=== Biome ===
Sandy deposits from pyroclastic surges around the Baixa da Ponta dos Rosais create small areas favourable to congregating sea mammals and other marine species.

Within a radius of 20 metres (66 ft) around Ponta dos Rosais there is an elevated number of animal and aquatic plant species. The area is a habitat for the brown alga Stypopodium zonale and the red alga Asparagopsis armata. Fish observed in the Baixa include anchovy, Atlantic bonito, Atlantic goliath grouper, bluefish, European hake, frigate tuna, longfin yellowtail, needlefish, red scorpionfish, sawfish, skipjack tuna, vadigo, and yellowmouth barracuda, among others. Common bottlenose dolphins and loggerhead sea turtles frequent the area. Marine birds including black-headed gull, common tern, Cory's shearwater, Eurasian whimbrel, great black-backed gull, Kentish plover, roseate tern, ruddy turnstone, and sanderling habitate or visit the Ponta dos Rosais area and its islets. In total, scientific researchers have identified 69 different species in the Baixa's waters, giving the area a 7.2 Margalef scale/biodiversity index-rating.

In recognition of their biodiversity, the Baixa's waters and Ponta dos Rosais are part of the Monumento Natural da Ponta dos Rosais (Ponta dos Rosais Natural Monument), a 170.2-hectare (421-acre) nature reserve within the Nature Park of São Jorge, one of the locally protected areas of the Azores. Since June 1995 the Baixa—as part of the overall Ponta dos Rosais area—has also been protected through the European Environment Agency's Natura 2000 initiative under the Habitats Directive.
