= Ponta dos Rosais =

- IUCN category III (natural monument or feature)
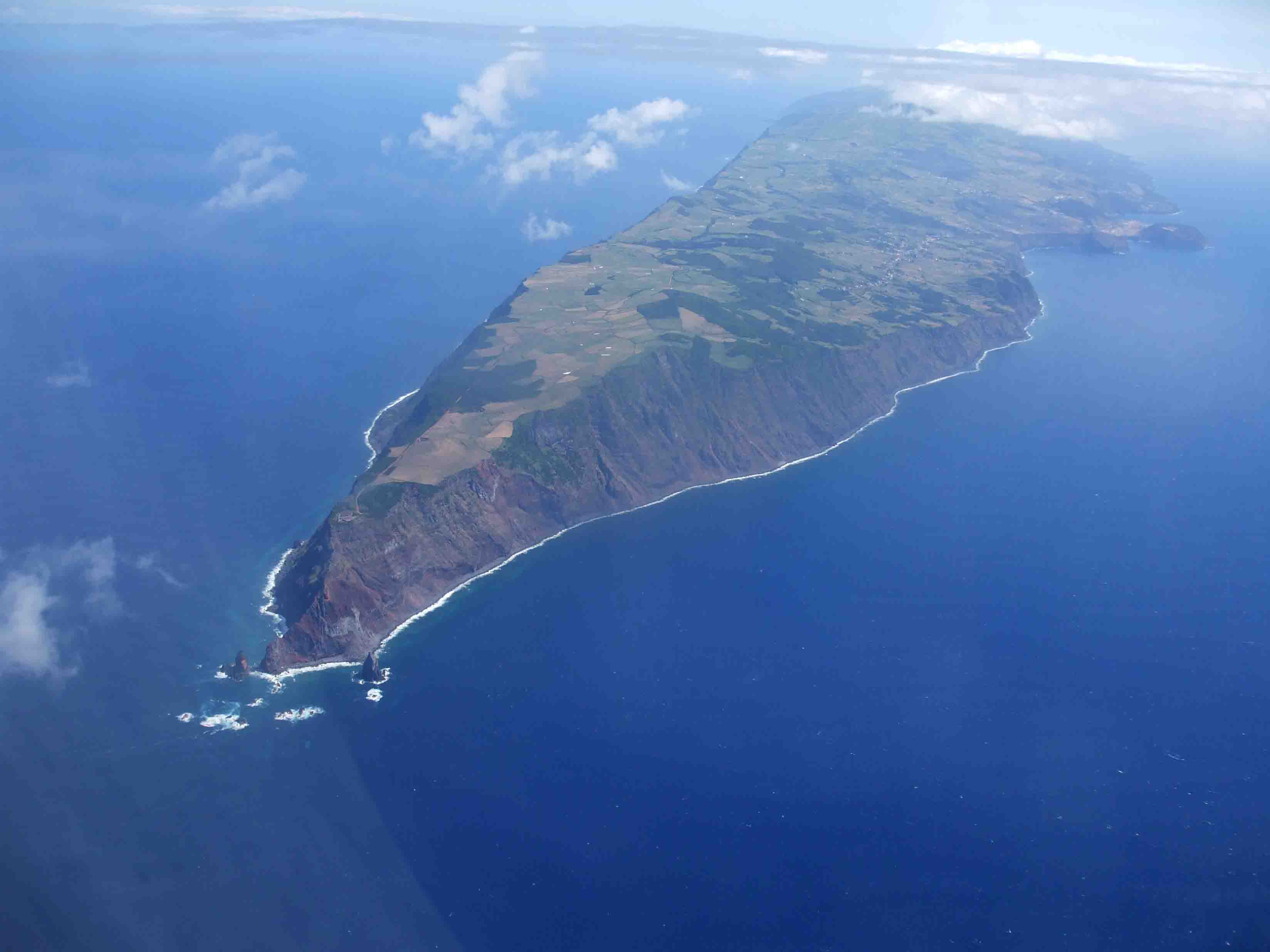
- An expansive view of Ponta dos Rosais, on the tip of the island of São Jorge

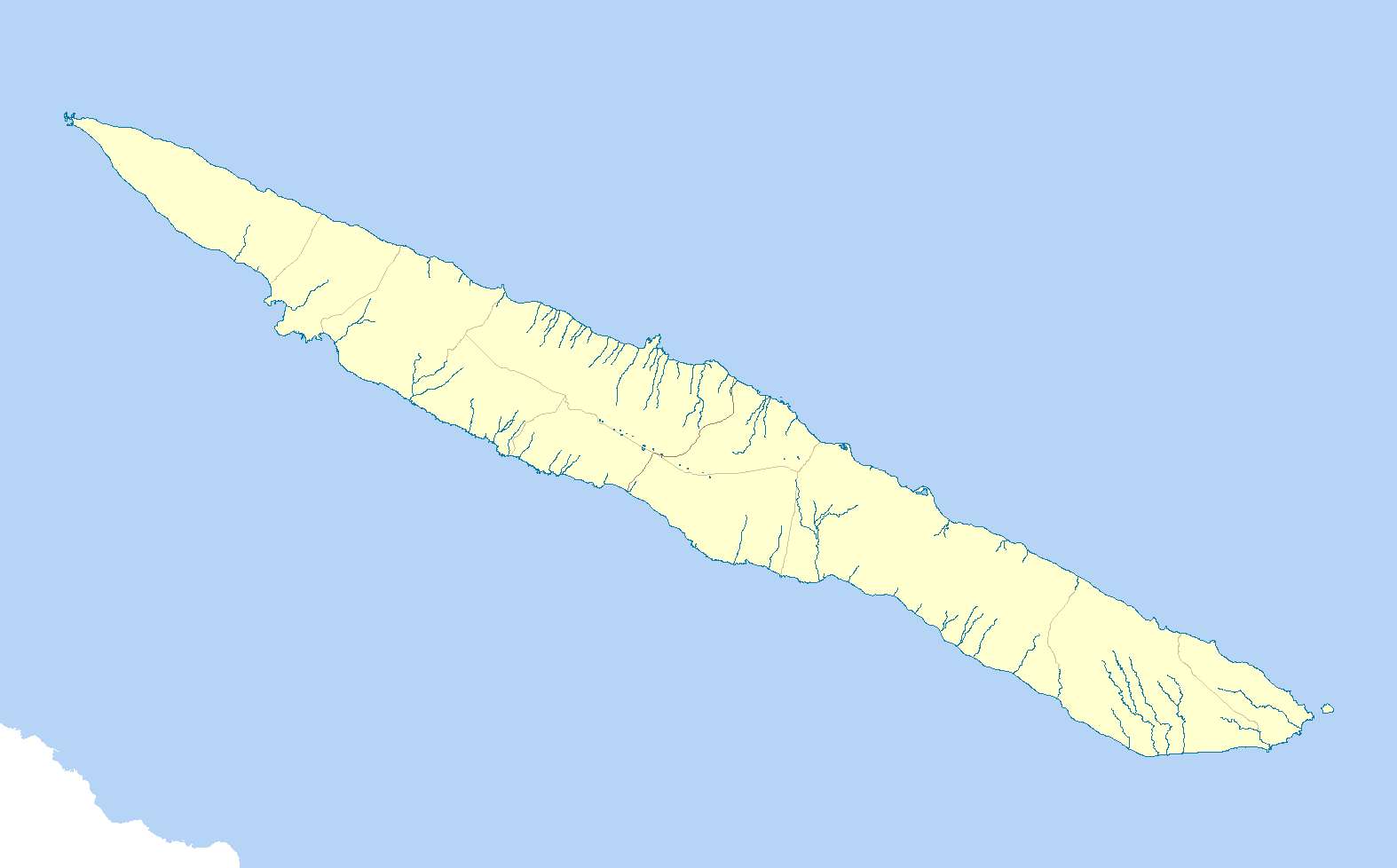
- Location within São Jorge
- Location: Velas, São Jorge, Portugal
- Coordinates: 38°45′20″N 28°19′1″W
- Area: 1.7 km^{2} (0.66 sq mi)
- Established: 2011

Ponta dos Rosais (Rosais Point, or literally, Point of the Rosaries) is a promontory located along the northwestern coast of the parish of Rosais, municipality of Velas, on the island of São Jorge in the Portuguese archipelago of the Azores.

== Geography ==
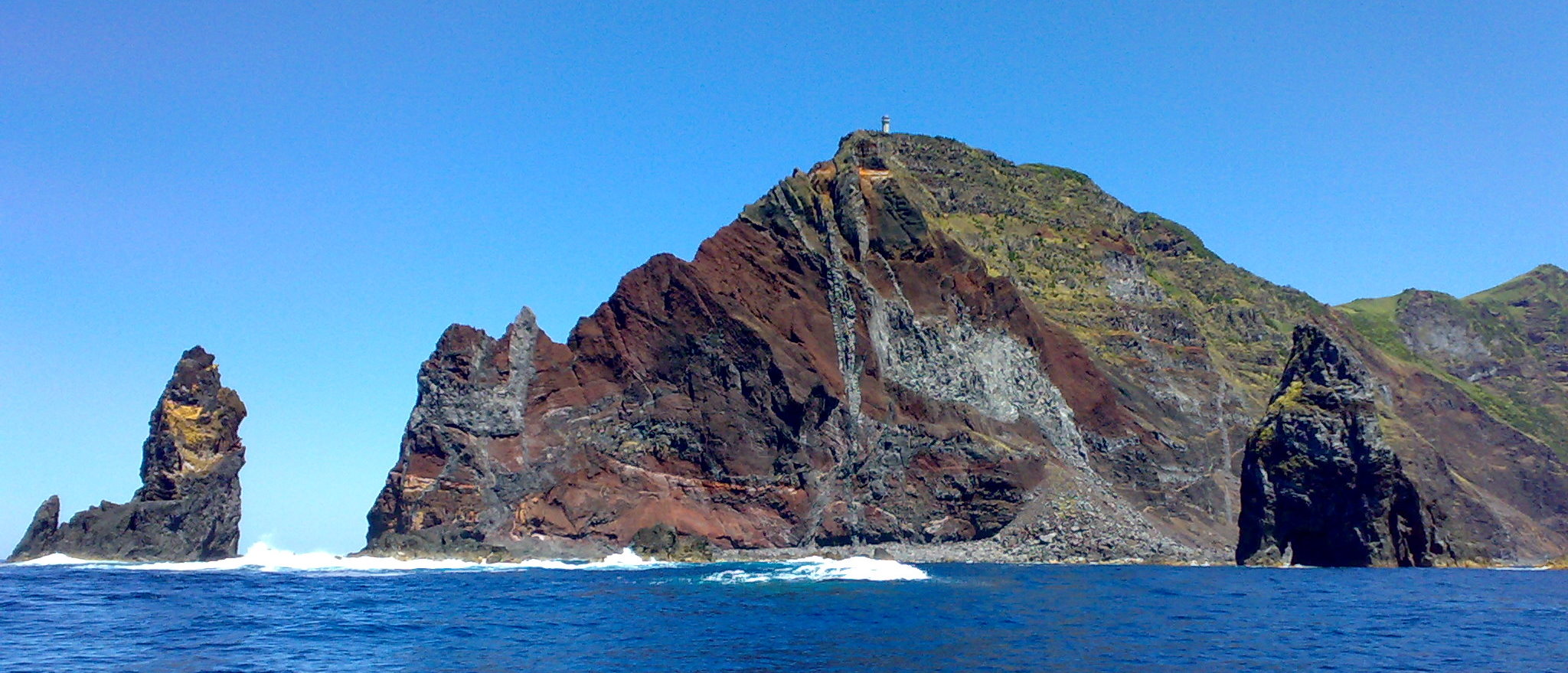
The view of the point from the coast, showing volcanic strata visible from shearing and landslides

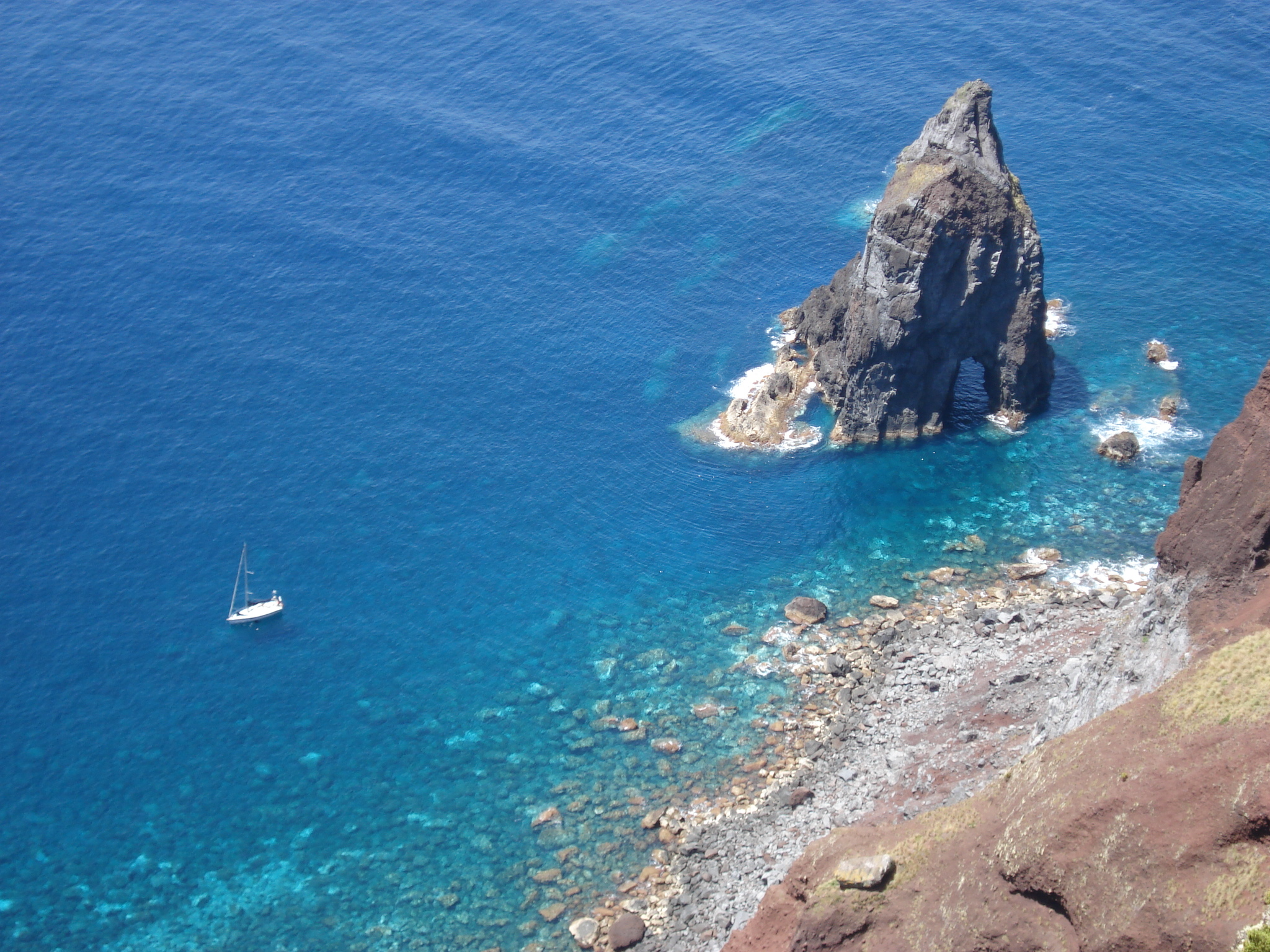
The small stack, Ilhéus dos Rosais, on the edge of the point

Ponta dos Rosais is situated 200 metres (660 ft) above sea level on the extreme northwestern tip of the island of São Jorge. The waters around Ponta dos Rosais consist of an oceanic plateau known as Baixa da Ponta dos Rosais: this plateau extends out north-northwest from the promontory. The islands of Faial, Pico, and Graciosa are often visible from Ponta dos Rosais. Faial and Pico are located approximately 15 kilometres (9.3 mi) from Ponta dos Rosais.

On the promontory stands the isolated, mid-century Nationalist lighthouse complex of Ponta dos Rosais.

Ponta dos Rosais and the surrounding area are within a locally protected area of the Azores known as the Monumento Natural da Ponta dos Rosais (Ponta dos Rosais Natural Monument), a 170.2-hectare (421-acre) nature reserve which is part of the larger Nature Park of São Jorge conservation zone. Since June 1995 the Ponta dos Rosais area has also been protected through the European Environment Agency's Natura 2000 initiative under the Habitats Directive.

This natural monument stretches from the coastal cliffs of Pico dos Cutelos along the southern coast to the northern cliffs and pasturelands of Chã do Areeiro. The reserve also includes the waters surrounding the point, the Rosais Islets, Ponta da Ilha, and Torrão da Açucar, as well as the Fajã Mata Sete, a volcanic debris field (fajã) of mixed basalt rocks, stacks, pyroclastic flows, and eroded debris. Sometimes treacherous trails—most skirting the coast—link together these various zones of the Ponta dos Rosais reserve.

=== Biome ===
The uplands are primarily pasture and other rural agricultural areas. Tourists visiting the area are attracted by the diversity of migratory and maritime bird species nesting in the cliffs of Ponta dos Rosais, including Cory's shearwater, little shearwater, common tern, and roseate tern.

Introduced predator species around Ponta dos Rosais include feral cats and dogs, mustelids, and rodents, though the lattermost are kept in check by kite predation.

Endemic flowering coastal plants present in the area include Azorean forget-me-not (Myosotis azorica) and Azorean heather (Erica azorica). The invasive cane grass Arundo donax threatens the continued presence and health of these endemic plants.
