= Azores triple junction =

Tectonic plates intersection

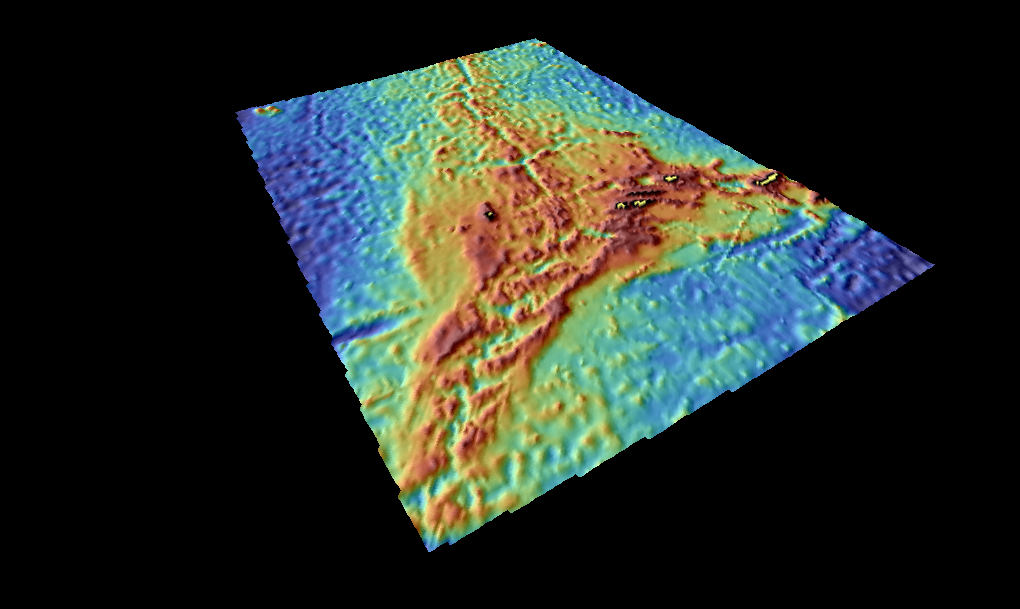
The Azores triple junction

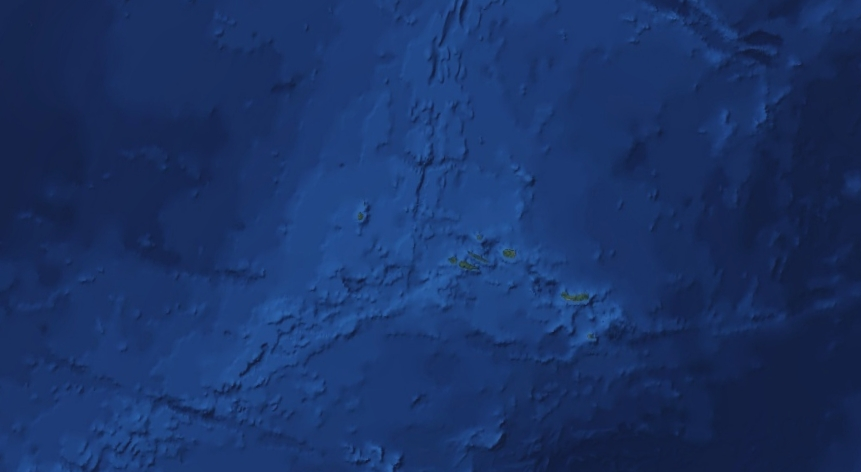
Azores triple junction

The Azores triple junction (ATJ) is a geologic triple junction where the boundaries of three tectonic plates intersect: the North American plate, the Eurasian plate and the African plate. This triple junction is located along the Mid-Atlantic Ridge (MAR) amidst the Azores islands, nearly due west of the Strait of Gibraltar. It is classified as an R-R-R triple junction of the T type (for its shape), as it is an intersection of the Mid-Atlantic Ridge running north–south and the Terceira Rift which runs east-southeast.

The spreading rate along the MAR does not change abruptly at the ATJ, instead decreasing from 22.9±0.1 mm/yr at 40°N to 19.8±0.2 mm/yr at 38°N. This means the ATJ is not a simple triple junction where three tectonic plates meet at a point. The transitional range of spreading rates instead indicates the presence of a microplate, commonly referred to as the Azores Microplate, although the observed behaviour can also be explained in terms of a diffuse boundary. Its northern boundary intersects the MAR between 39.4°N and 40.0°N and its southern between 38.2°N and 38.5°N. The microplate moves about 2 mm/yr east-northeast along its Nubian (African plate) boundary.
