= Stypopodium schimperi =

Scientific classification
- Domain: Eukaryota
- Clade: Sar
- Clade: Stramenopiles
- Division: Ochrophyta
- Class: Phaeophyceae
- Order: Dictyotales
- Family: Dictyotaceae
- Genus: Stypopodium
- Species: S. schimperi

Binomial name
- Stypopodium schimperi (Buchinger ex Kützing) Verlaque & Boudouresque, 1991

Species of algae

Stypopodium schimperi is a species of brown algae in the family Dictyotaceae. Native to the western Indian Ocean, it has spread quickly and become a prevalent invasive species in Mediterranean and the Adriatic Sea through Lessepsian migration. For this reason, it has started to be examined for its potential use in the blue economy.
