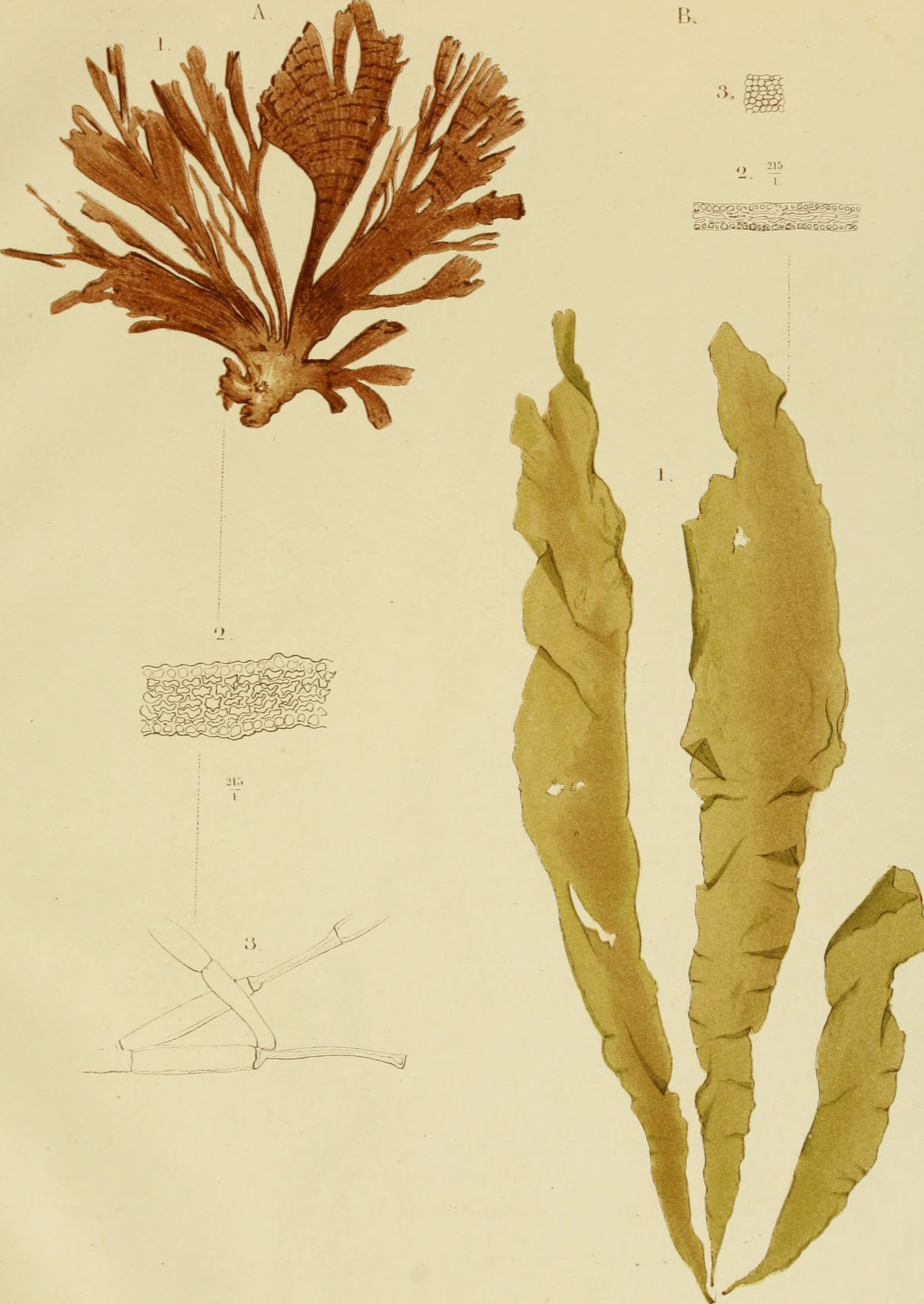
- Stypopodium multipartitum (figs. 1-3)

Scientific classification
- Domain: Eukaryota
- Clade: Sar
- Clade: Stramenopiles
- Division: Ochrophyta
- Class: Phaeophyceae
- Order: Dictyotales
- Family: Dictyotaceae
- Genus: Stypopodium; J. Agardh, 1894

Species
- Stypopodium atomarium (Woodward) Kützing; Stypopodium attenuatum Kützing, 1849; Stypopodium australasicum (Zanardini) Allender & Kraft, 1983; Stypopodium flabelliforme Weber-van Bosse, 1913; Stypopodium multipartitum (Suhr) P.C.Silva, 1996; Stypopodium rabdoides (Allender & Kraft) Kraft, 2009; Stypopodium schimperi (Buchinger ex Kützing) Verlaque & Boudouresque, 1991; Stypopodium shameelii M.Nizamuddin & K.Aisha; Stypopodium tubruqense M.Nizamuddin & M.Godeh; Stypopodium zonale (J.V.Lamouroux) Papenfuss, 1940

= Stypopodium =

Genus of brown algae

Stypopodium is a genus of thalloid brown alga in the family Dictyotaceae. Members of the genus are found in shallow tropical and subtropical seas around Africa, Pakistan, India, Japan, Indonesia, Australia, Micronesia, the Caribbean, Venezuela, and Brazil.

== Characteristics ==
The thalli are usually erect but sometimes prostrate, growing to a length of about 35 centimetres (14 in). They are attached to the substrate by a rhizoidal holdfast and often form bushy clumps. The blades are membranous and either wedge shaped or divided into linear segments. The sporangia are densely scattered over the surface of the blade or occur in irregularly-shaped sori, forming four spores.

== Species ==
The World Register of Marine Species includes the following species in the genus:

- Stypopodium atomarium (Woodward) Kützing
- Stypopodium australasicum (Zanardini) Allender & Kraft, 1983
- Stypopodium flabelliforme Weber-van Bosse, 1913
- Stypopodium multipartitum (Suhr) P.C.Silva, 1996
- Stypopodium rabdoides (Allender & Kraft) Kraft, 2009
- Stypopodium schimperi (Buchinger ex Kützing) Verlaque & Boudouresque, 1991
- Stypopodium shameelii M.Nizamuddin & K.Aisha
- Stypopodium tubruqense M.Nizamuddin & M.Godeh
- Stypopodium zonale (J.V.Lamouroux) Papenfuss, 1940
