= Terceira Rift =

Geological plate boundary

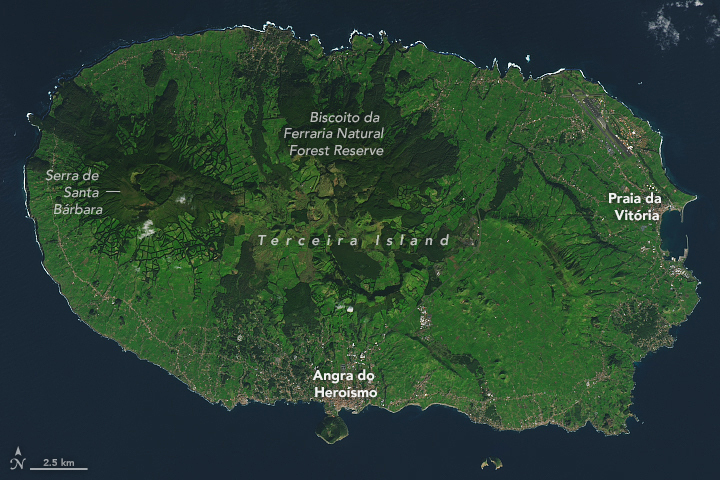
Terceira Island from space, 2020. The Terceira Rift passes through the island, and presumably acts as the feeder for the magma that created the island about 400,000 years ago. The most recent surface eruption was at Serra de Santa Bárbara in 1761. Subsea eruptions continue, the most recent in 2000.

The Terceira Rift is a geological rift located amidst the Azores islands in the Atlantic Ocean. It runs between the Azores triple junction to the west and the Azores–Gibraltar transform fault to the southeast. It separates the Eurasian plate to the north from the African plate to the south. The Terceira Rift is named for Terceira Island through which it passes. It crosses Terceira Island as a prominent ESE–WNW fissure zone.

== Geological information ==
The Terceira Rift is 550 km long, and represents the world's slowest spreading center, with plate divergence of 2–4 mm/year. It developed from a transform fault and now operates as a hyper-slow spreading center, as recognized by the relative movement between the African and Eurasian plates. There is a strong resemblance between the Terceira Rift and other ultra- or super- slow spreading ridges, such as the Gakkel Rift and the Southwest Indian Ridge. In particular, high obliquity values of 40°–65°, and a magmatic segmentation wavelength of 100 km, are similar to other very slow rifts. Rift valleys present along the rift are 1000–2200 m deep, and 30–60 km wide, similar to the Mid-Atlantic Ridge median valley. However, the amplitude of the Terceira Rift along-strike topography is 2000–4000 m, which is much larger than expected for ultraslow spreading ridges. This irregularity is thought to be due to the association of the rift with the Azores hotspot, in combination with slow spreading rates. Slow spreading results in a strong and thick axial elastic plate, and slower volcanic extrusions from the rift zone, resulting in high topography when merged with plume-related volcanism. The large volume of volcanism associated with the hotspot is mainly controlled by regional extension between Africa and Eurasia, as indicated by strikes of extension fractures. Furthermore, the majority of inter-plate deformation is focused on the Terceira Rift, although a clear deformation pattern has not yet been recognized.

== Pre-rift influences ==
The structures present along the Terceira Rift have directions likely associated with pre-rift geometry, as they do not correspond to the current direction of spreading motion, which is approximately N70°. Evidence of pre-rift structures include ancient transform directions of N110°–N125°, reactivating as transtensional fault zones, and N–S directions from former middle-oceanic rift faults, reactivating as left-lateral fault zones. Other hotspot associated islands do not display these features, and thus, the reactivated structures are most likely a result of the complex tectonic setting associated with the Azores triple junction instability. The above observations may represent earlier stages of development between the rifting of Eurasia and Africa. The first stage began in 25 Ma and lasted until 8 Ma, corresponding to the initial rifting of the oceanic plateau. At 8 Ma, extension began along a transform fault, until approximately 3 Ma, when the Terceira Rift axis was initiated.

== The Azores Hotspot and the resulting Azores Plateau ==
The Azores Plateau began to form around 10 Ma, and is characterized by isotopic and elemental variations indicative of large heterogeneities in the mantle beneath it. There is also evidence of only one magmatic source, and no interaction with other volcanic systems. Additionally, the presence of thick crust and complex volcano-tectonic fabric implies the plateau developed through the migration of the Terceira Rift towards the NE, causing a constant position over a fixed hotspot. As previously mentioned, the Azores hotspot is thought to be the primary source for the excess magmatism along the Terceira Rift, resulting in the anomalously high relief of along-strike topography, and is considered to be sampling a relatively undegassed, primitive reservoir. Lines of evidence for the plume-shaped structure in this area include mantle seismic anomalies, bathymetry and gravity anomalies, and plume noble gas signatures associated with the hotspot. However, there is also a possibility the increased magmatic activity on the Terceira Rift is a partial result of the involvement with the rift–rift–rift triple junction between the Eurasian, African, and North American plates.
