= Lighthouse of Ponta dos Rosais =

Lighthouse in Portugal

Ponta dos Rosais Lighthouse Farol dos Rosais
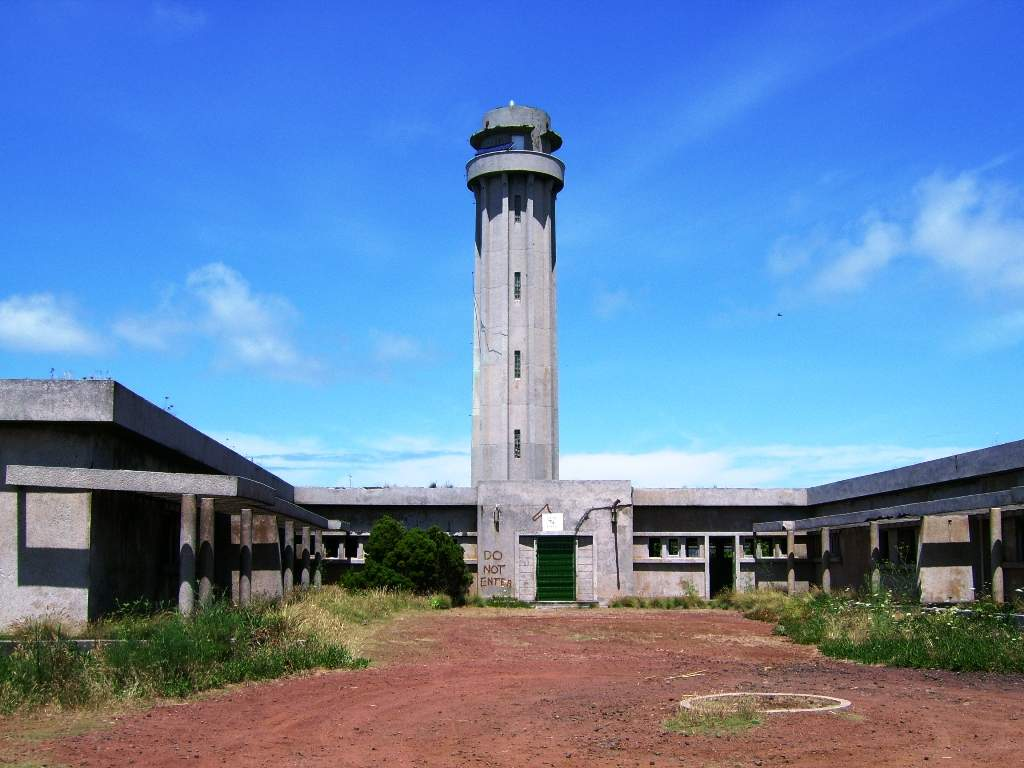
- The front façade of the Ponta dos Rosais Lighthouse and complex, abandoned after the 1964 Rosais earthquake
- Location: São Jorge, Azores, Portugal
- Coordinates: 38°45′13″N 28°18′42″W

Tower
- Constructed: 1958
- Construction: concrete
- Automated: 5 July 1982
- Height: 27 m (89 ft)
- Operator: Portuguese Republic
- Heritage: heritage without legal protection

Light
- Focal height: 283 m (928 ft)
- Range: 8 nautical miles (15 km; 9.2 mi)
- Characteristic: Fl(2) W 10s

The Ponta dos Rosais Lighthouse (Portuguese: Farol da Ponta dos Rosais) is a beacon and lighthouse located along the 200 m cliffs of Ponta dos Rosais near Rosais in the extreme northwest of the island of São Jorge, in the Archipelago of the Azores, Portugal. It includes the main tower and several living quarters and auxiliary buildings constructed for the maintenance and operation of the lighthouse, currently abandoned and in ruins. This includes structures such as a motor-pool, a communal hearth and a series of concrete lavoirs for washing, as well as the larger block devoted to administration and private residences.

== History ==
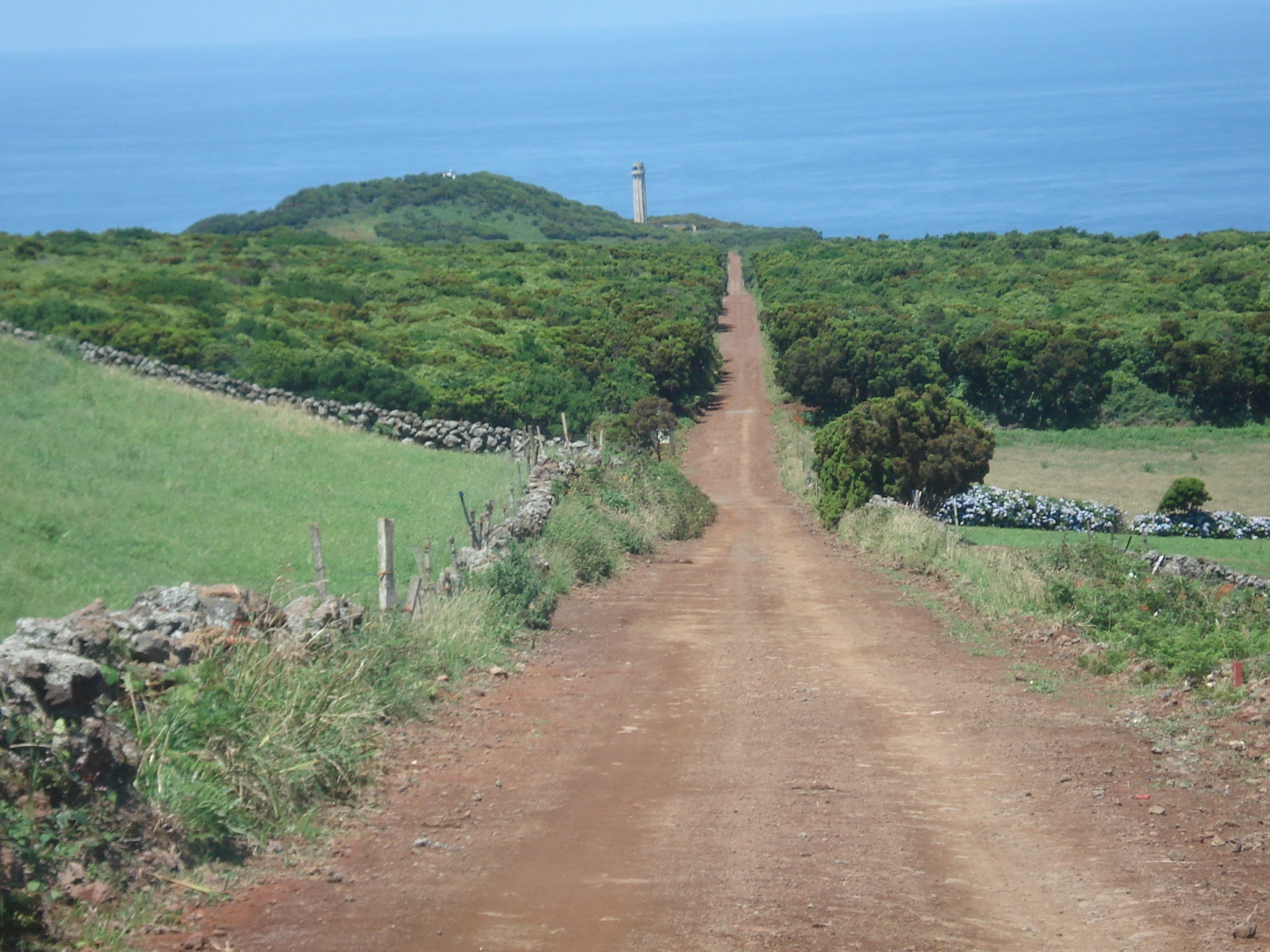
The lighthouse is located at the extreme western coast of São Jorge, accessible by a single dirt road

There was already a notion, by 1890, that a beacon was necessary on the western coast of São Jorge, and a lighthouse was planned for the region.

In 1956, the project was continued by the Comissão Administrativa das Novas Instalações (Administrative Commission for New Installations), an arm of the Portuguese Navy (with a completion predicted for 1957). Yet, by that time the project continued to be audited by the Administrative Commission of the Navy.

At the conclusion of the building project (in 1958), the installation of the equipment began on 1 May, which included mounting of the dual-optical cathode beacon which permitted a 500-metre focal distance. Power was provided by groups of groups of engines that provided power to its 3000 watt/110 volt acetylene lamp. It was finally completed and inaugurated in 1964. At the time of its construction, it was the most advanced lighthouse in the Portuguese network. It was also a self-sufficient complex, with residences for several families, an independent water supply and a power-source to operate independently from the rest of the parish.

Shortly after the lighthouse was completed, it was abandoned during the 1964 Rosais earthquake, when seismic events and an underwater eruption hit the Ponta dos Rosais, causing damage to 900 homes and 400 buildings in the parish of Rosais. The earthquake caused enough panic to warrant the evacuation of its residents to the neighbouring island of Terceira, which included the temporary evacuation of the lighthouse families. Over time these fears were mitigated and life resumed at the complex.

There was a substitution of the main lamp for dioptic model with 150 mm focal distance, and with 50 watt/12 volt capacity and supported by batteries charged by photovoltaic solar panels. The change, although more efficient, allowed the beacon to be seen for 8 nautical miles (15 km).

Then, on 1 January 1980, a series of seismic events, in the order of 7 on the Richter magnitude scale caused destruction to homes on Terceira, Graciosa, Faial and São Jorge islands. These events caused significant damage to the structure of the lighthouse and buildings, necessitating a complete abandonment of the complex.

The lighthouse was automated and reopened on 5 July 1982.
