= Azores hotspot =

Volcanic hotspot at the Azores

Coordinates: 38°30′N 28°45′W

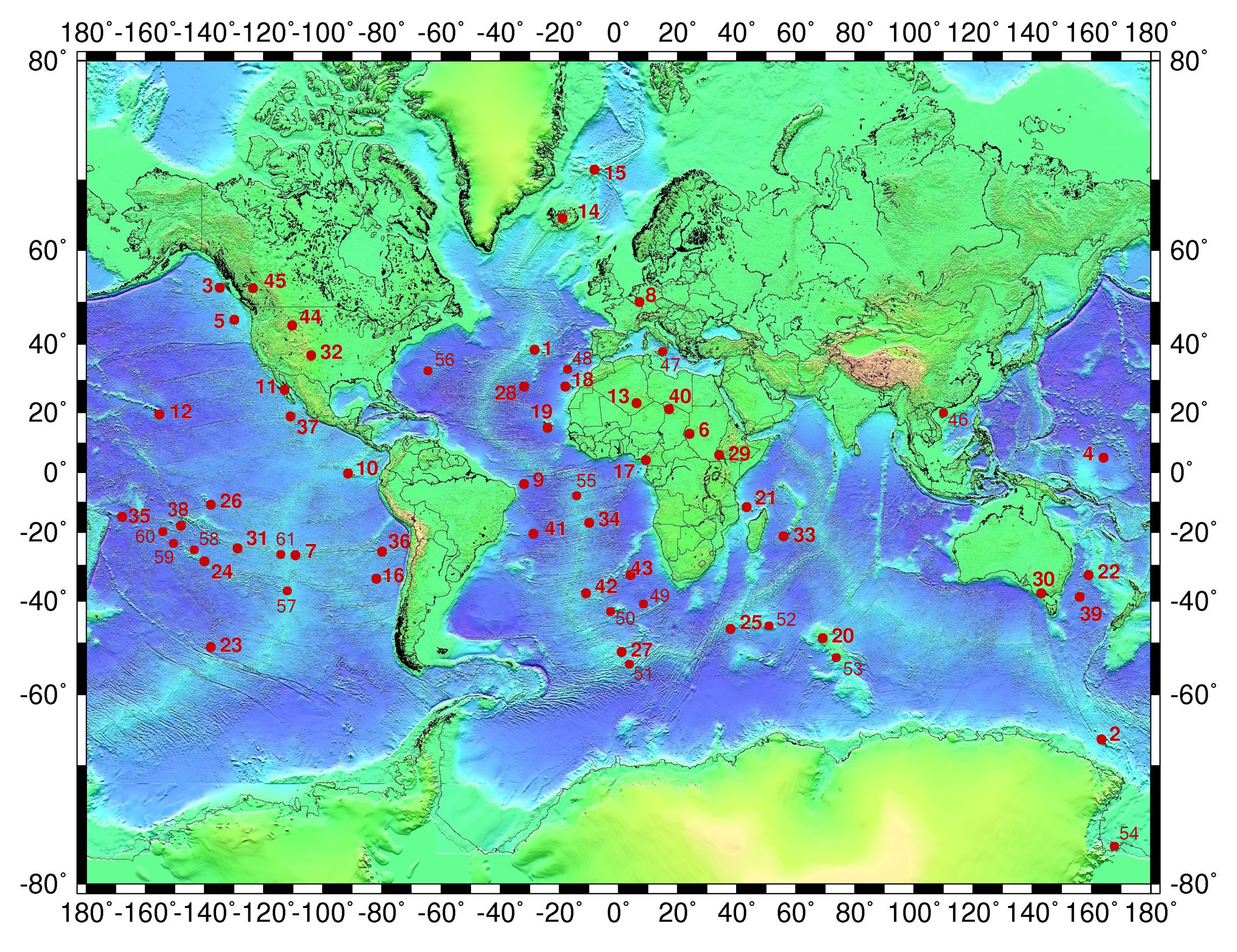
The Azores hotspot is marked 1 on map

The Azores hotspot is a volcanic hotspot in the Northern Atlantic Ocean. The Azores is relatively young and is associated with a bathymetric swell, a gravity anomaly and ocean island basalt geochemistry. The Azores hotspot lies just east of the Mid-Atlantic Ridge

== Geological area ==
The Azores domain comprises the Azores Plateau and the Azores archipelago (formed of 9 islands extending a distance of 480 kilometres (300 miles) which have been volcanically active for around 7 million years). The archipelago lies on the lateral branch of the Mid-Atlantic Ridge near the junction of three major tectonic plates; the North American Plate, the Eurasian Plate and the African Plate. This unique location causes the area to have ridge-hotspot interaction with a variation of volcanic processes.

== The Azores Plateau ==
The Azores archipelago rises from Azores Plateau, which is an area of thickened oceanic crust thought to have formed over the last 20 million years. Negative velocity S-wave anomalies have been mapped beneath the Azores in the upper 250–300 kilometres (160–190 miles). This has been suggested to be a signature of a plume that created the Azores Plateau. Another theory is that the excess volcanism simply results from excess extension at this unusual triple junction.

== Hotspot–ridge relationships ==
The Mid-Atlantic Ridge is a zone of extension that permits magma to rise, forming dikes and surface volcanism. Areas of excess magmatism on the Mid-Atlantic Ridge have been called hotspots e.g. the Azores. Gravity field modelling studies have shown that the crustal thickness in this area is 60% greater than normal and the spreading ridge is elevated. The hotspot is asymmetrical (north and south). It is thought that crust at ridges is formed by a combination of processes (magmatic and tectonic) with magma addition coming from short lived magma chambers. The increased melt production within the mantle may have supported a longer lived magma chamber causing the crust to be thicker. However, the Mid-Atlantic Ridge has also been shown to have affected the characteristics of the Azores Plateau. It has been suggested that the main volcanic ridges on the plateau were created at the Mid-Atlantic Ridge spreading axis.
