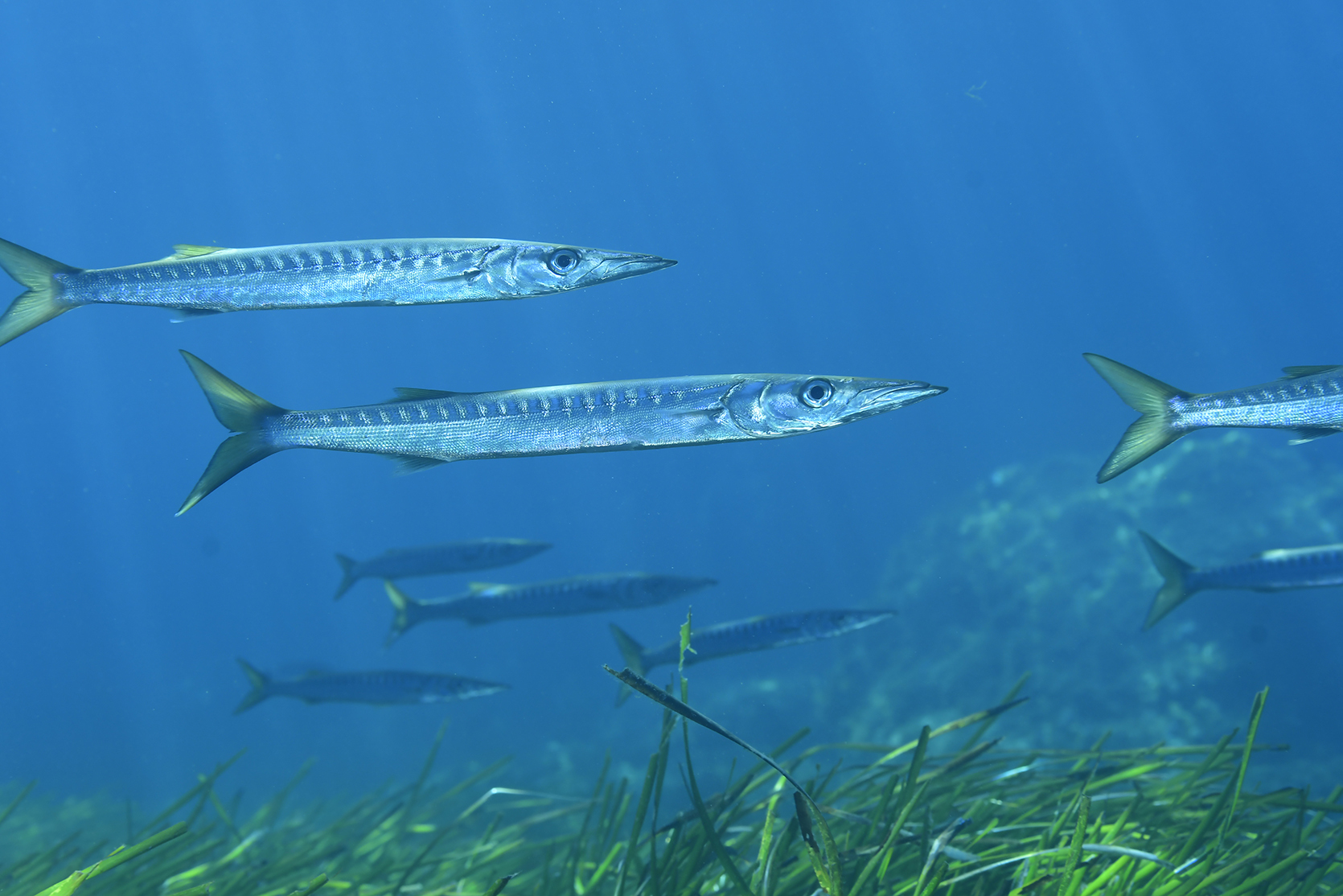

Conservation status
- Least Concern (IUCN 3.1)

Scientific classification
- Kingdom: Animalia
- Phylum: Chordata
- Class: Actinopterygii
- Order: Carangiformes
- Suborder: Centropomoidei
- Family: Sphyraenidae
- Genus: Sphyraena
- Species: S. viridensis

Binomial name
- Sphyraena viridensis Cuvier, 1829

= Sphyraena viridensis =

Species of fish

Sphyraena viridensis, the yellowmouth barracuda or yellow barracuda, is a predatory ray-finned fish from the family Sphyraenidae, the barracudas. It is found in the warmer waters of the eastern Atlantic Ocean and the Mediterranean. It is often confused with the European barracuda.

== Description ==
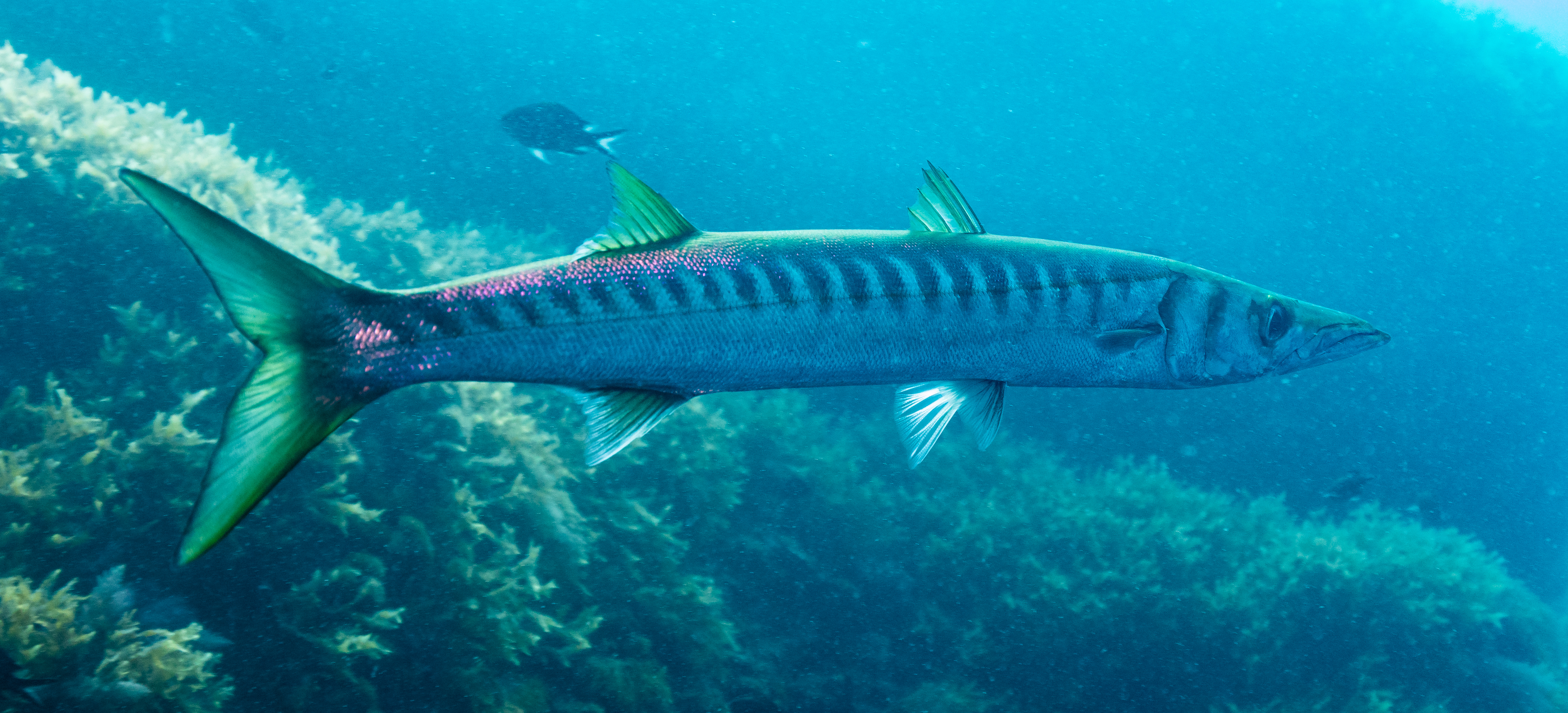
Cape Palos, Spain

Sphyraena viridensis has a fusiform body with a long, streamlined pointed snout which has a long mouth lined with two rows of sharp, fang-like teeth and a jutting lower jaw. There are no scales on the preoperculum, unlike the European barracuda, which has scales on both the anterior and posterior margins of the preoperculum. There are numerous transverse dark bars on the dorsum; these usually extend below the lateral line, while the same lines in the European barracuda do not do so. The bars fade in dead specimens. Generally, the colouration of adult S. viridensis is dark above and silvery below (this is an example of countershading), while juveniles are dark yellow or greenish in colour. S. viridensis is smaller than its European counterpart, growing to a standard length of 65 cm (26 in), although the average length is 35–40 cm (14–16 in). However, specimens up to 1,190 mm (47 in) have been caught off the Azores. The rod caught record is 10.2 kg (22 lb 8 oz), which was caught off Lanzarote in the Canary Islands in 2007.

== Distribution ==
The exact distribution of S. viridensis is unclear because of confusion with the European barracuda; however, it is known that it occurs in subtropical areas of the eastern Atlantic (around the Azores, Madeira, Cape Verde Islands and the Canary Islands). It has also been recorded in the Mediterranean, including off the coasts of Lebanon, Israel, Algeria, Corsica and Sicily, in the Adriatic Sea, the Aegean Sea, and even as far north as Cornwall in the United Kingdom.

== Prey and predators ==
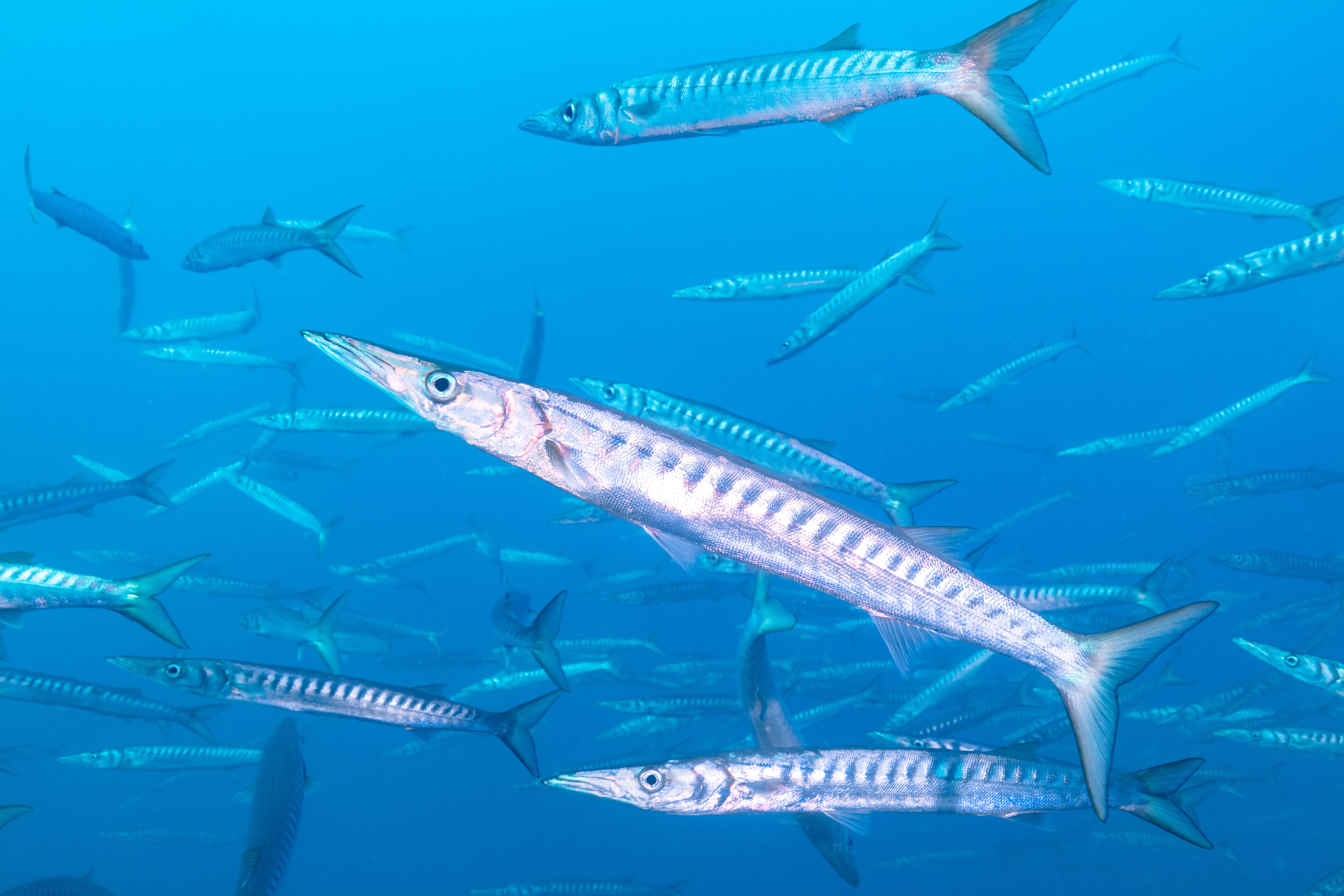
School in Cape Palos, Spain

In a study in the Azores, fish made up all of the diet of S. viridensis, with the most important species being the bluejack mackerel, which was found as having been preyed upon by 72.4% of the fish sampled and making up nearly two thirds of the weight of prey taken. Other species recorded in this study included bogues, ornate wrasses and axillary sea breams, as well as an unidentified species of flying fish. Unidentifiable fish remains were found in nearly 20% of the specimens sampled. The predatory behaviour of S. viridensis was observed in the same study; they were found to be active pursuit predators of fish, with one or many barracudas hunting together, either singling out lone prey or attacking shoals of prey fish. The pursuit was rapid and was usually over in 8–40 seconds, and the more fish involved, the higher the rate of success was.

Some other known prey species of S. viridensis include the longspine snipefish, the boar fish, and cephalopods and crustaceans.

Juveniles of S. viridensis are preyed upon by the Atlantic lizardfish. This shows that there is an overlap in habitat between the juvenile barracudas and the lizard fish, which occurs in sheltered, very enclosed bays with sandy substrates.

== Behaviour ==
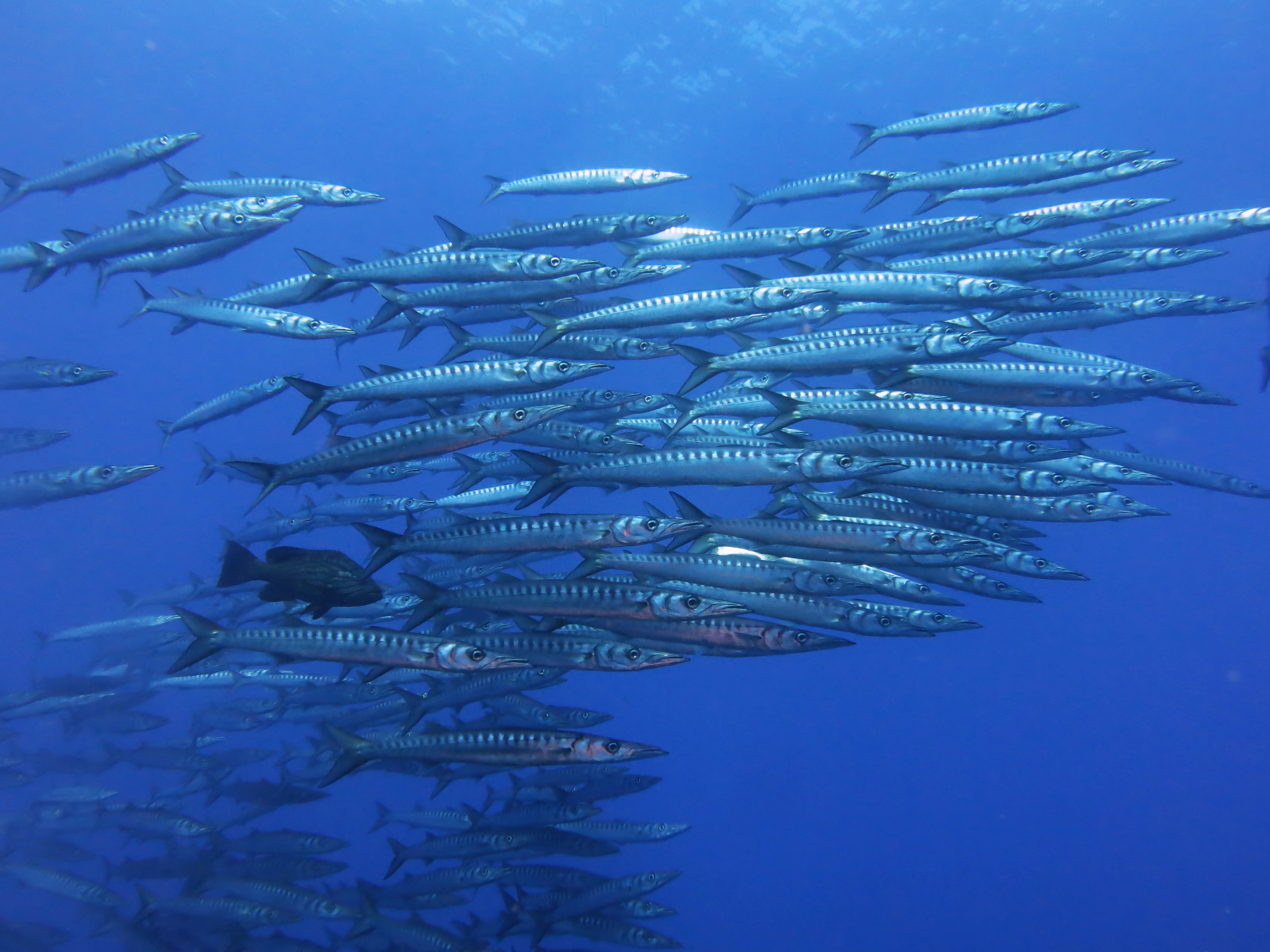
School in Ustica, Italy

In summer, S. viridensis may form schools of up to 200 fish (although most schools only number 30-40 fish) in areas where there are strong currents. These schools are predominantly made up of sub-adults, with the smaller fish nearer to the surface and the larger ones, usually female, at the bottom, at depths of up to 30 m (98 ft). In winter, the only aggregations are small groups of juveniles in shallow bays. No territorial behaviour has been observed. Schooling is thought to be an anti-predator defence, to facilitate mating (with the smaller males being attracted to the larger females), and to increase the success rate of hunting. This species does not appear to mix with other barracuda species in mixed schools, but there are reports of these fish associating with whale sharks in the Azores and an instance of them actively swimming towards a manta ray.

== Fisheries ==
Sphyraena viridensis is landed in small quantities in the eastern Mediterranean by fishermen using in trammel-nets and beach-seines. It has been reported from markets in Turkey but it is generally caught as a bycatch, although as numbers increase in the Mediterranean, it may be becoming a more important species for fisheries.
