= Stypopodium zonale =

Scientific classification
- Domain: Eukaryota
- Clade: Sar
- Clade: Stramenopiles
- Division: Ochrophyta
- Class: Phaeophyceae
- Order: Dictyotales
- Family: Dictyotaceae
- Genus: Stypopodium
- Species: S. zonale

Binomial name
- Stypopodium zonale (J.V.Lamouroux) Papenfuss, 1940

Synonyms
- Dictyota zonaria 2; Fucus zonalis; Padina lobata; Stypopodium fuliginosum; Stypopodium lobatum; Zonaria lobata

Species of brown alga

Stypopodium zonale is a species of thalloid brown alga in the family Dictyotaceae. It is found in shallow waters in the Caribbean Sea and in various other tropical and sub-tropical seas around the world.

== Description ==
Stypopodium zonale is a golden brown or olive-coloured seaweed growing to a length of about 40 centimetres (16 in). It has smooth, broad blades with squared-off ends that grow in a fan shape. As the blade gets bigger it splits into segments 1 to 5 centimetres (0.39 to 1.97 in) wide. The larger the plant, the greater the degree of splitting. Bands of different coloured material develop parallel to the growing edge including an iridescent green band that appears every few centimetres. This gives the seaweed an attractive zoned appearance. It is attached to rock by a rhizoidal holdfast and often forms dense beds, the leathery but flexible fronds swaying with the movement of the surrounding water.

== Distribution and habitat ==
Stypopodium zonale is found in shallow areas of the sea around the coasts of Africa, the Canary Islands, Madeira, Florida, Bermuda, The Bahamas, the Caribbean Islands, South America, the Galápagos Islands, Pakistan, Sri Lanka, Singapore, Vietnam, Indonesia, New Zealand and Queensland. In the Caribbean Sea it grows to depths of 55 metres (180 ft) and it is the dominant benthic alga around Bermuda at depths of 20 to 30 metres (66 to 98 ft).

== Research ==
A number of secondary metabolites have been isolated from Stypopodium zonale including several unique cyclic terpenes. These metabolites serve a defensive function and reduce grazing by herbivores. In a research study, the seaweed was extracted with dichloromethane and it was found that the extract was mildly antibacterial and was toxic to fish. This means that any fish that tries feeding on the seaweed is unlikely to come back for more. One of the metabolites, stypoldione, has been shown to inhibit cell division in sea urchin eggs and another exhibits cytotoxic activity against human lung and colon carcinoma cells. In another study it was found that some of the metabolites were present across the whole of the seaweed's range but others were found only in localised populations.
