= Azores Plateau =

Oceanic plateau in the North Atlantic Ocean

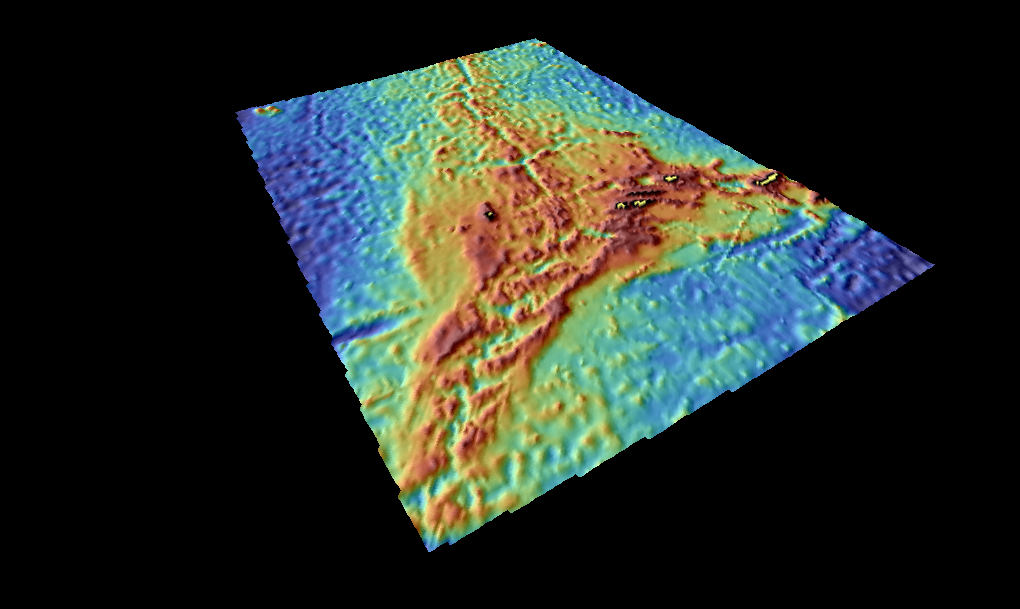
Bathymetry image of the Azores Plateau with some of the Azores islands marked in yellow

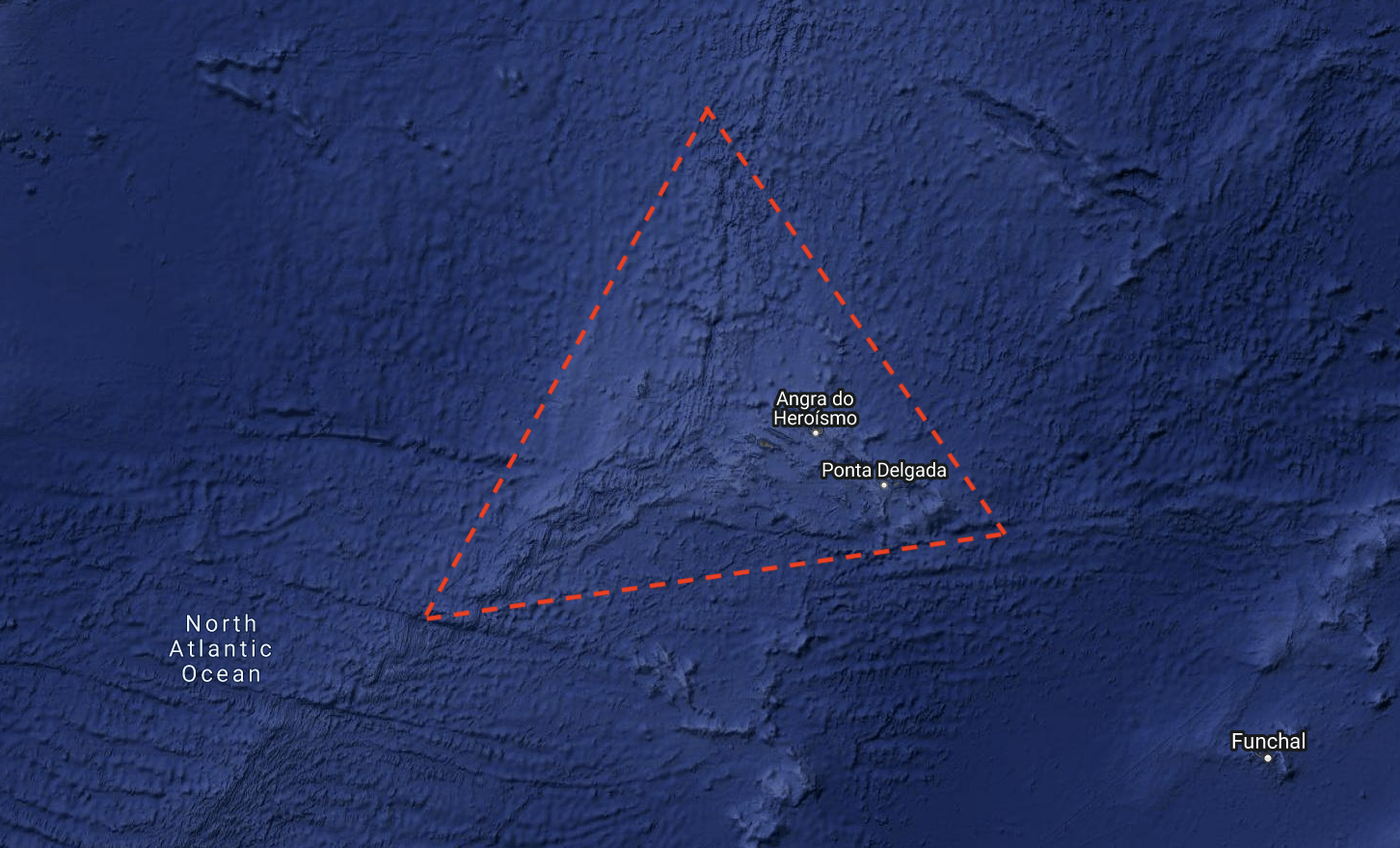
Azores Plateau satellite image with some azorean cities named.

The Azores Plateau or Azores Platform is an oceanic plateau encompassing the Azores archipelago and the Azores triple junction in the North Atlantic Ocean. It was formed by the Azores hotspot 20 million years ago and is still associated with active volcanism.

The plateau consists of a roughly triangular-shaped large igneous province that lies less than 2,000 m (6,600 ft) below sea level.

A lack of age progression amongst the younger submarine and subaerial volcanism combined with excess melting as evident from the shallow water depth and the presence of islands in the Azores suggest it may fit the waning mantle plume.
