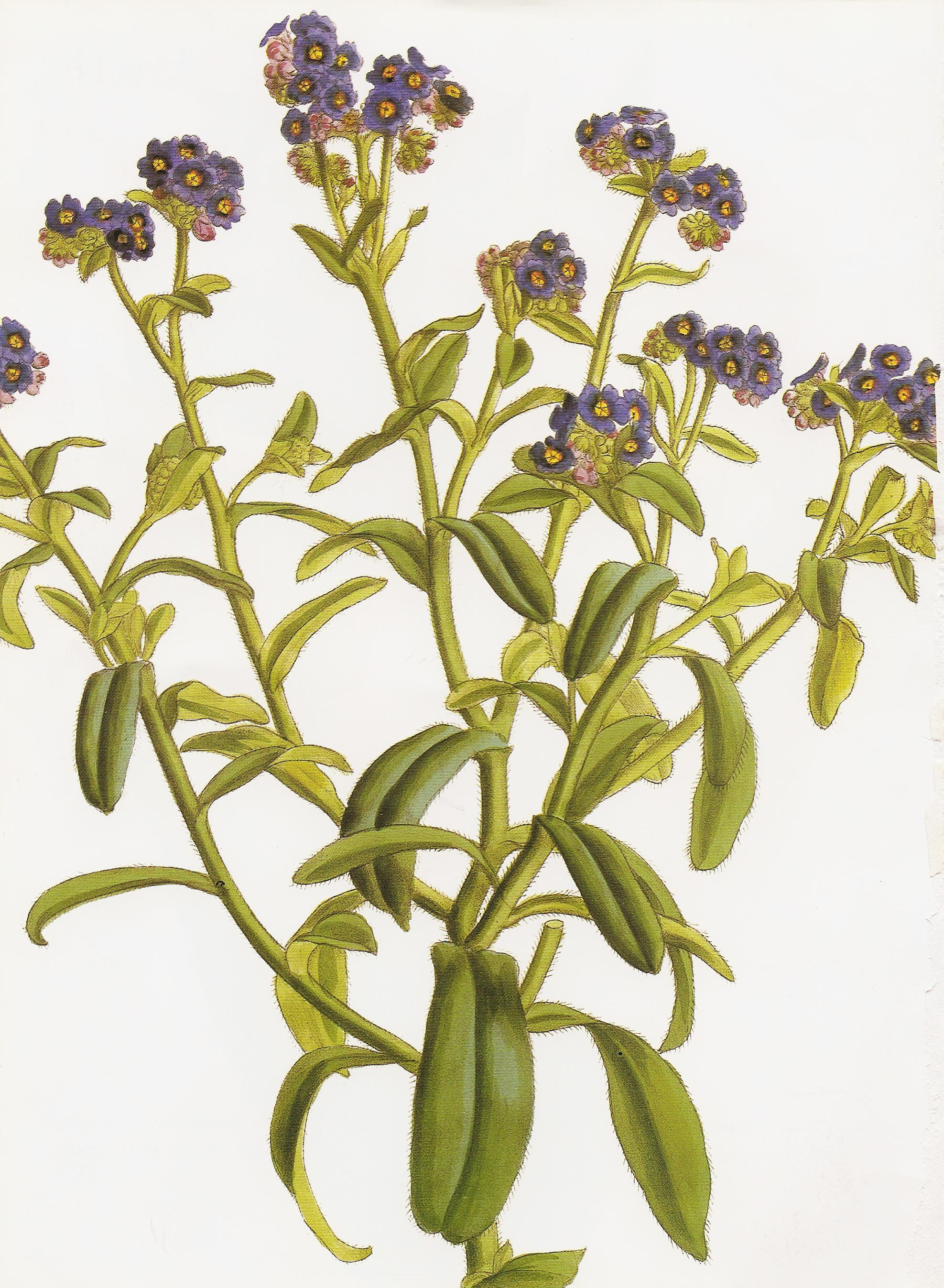

Conservation status
- Vulnerable (IUCN 3.1)

Scientific classification
- Kingdom: Plantae
- Clade: Tracheophytes
- Clade: Angiosperms
- Clade: Eudicots
- Clade: Asterids
- Order: Boraginales
- Family: Boraginaceae
- Genus: Myosotis
- Species: M. azorica

Binomial name
- Myosotis azorica H.C. Watson

Synonyms
- Myosotis maritima Hochst. ex Seub.

= Myosotis azorica =

Azorean forget-me not

Species of flowering plant

Myosotis azorica, common name Azorean mouse-ear or Azorean forget-me-not, is a plant species endemic to the Azores Islands in the North Atlantic Ocean.

== Description ==
Myosotis azorica is a perennial herb with decumbent stems up to 30 cm (12 inches) tall. Leaves are lanceolate, clasping the stem, with numerous soft flexible hairs. Flowers are borne in "scorpioid cymes," i.e. on spirally curving stems resembling a scorpion's tail or a half-unfurled fiddlehead fern leaf. Flowers are deep blue-purple with a yellow center.

== Distribution and habitat ==
Myosotis azorica is endemic to the western Azores, occurring only on the westernmost islands of Flores and Corvo. The last wild populations on Flores went extinct recently. Reports from other islands in the Azores are confusions with the related Myosotis maritima, a strictly coastal species. It grows near waterfalls and on wet rocks and in wet meadows above 500 meters altitude. Its native range covers less than 15 square kilometres (5.8 sq mi), with the total number of individuals estimated at less than 50, so the species is vulnerable.
