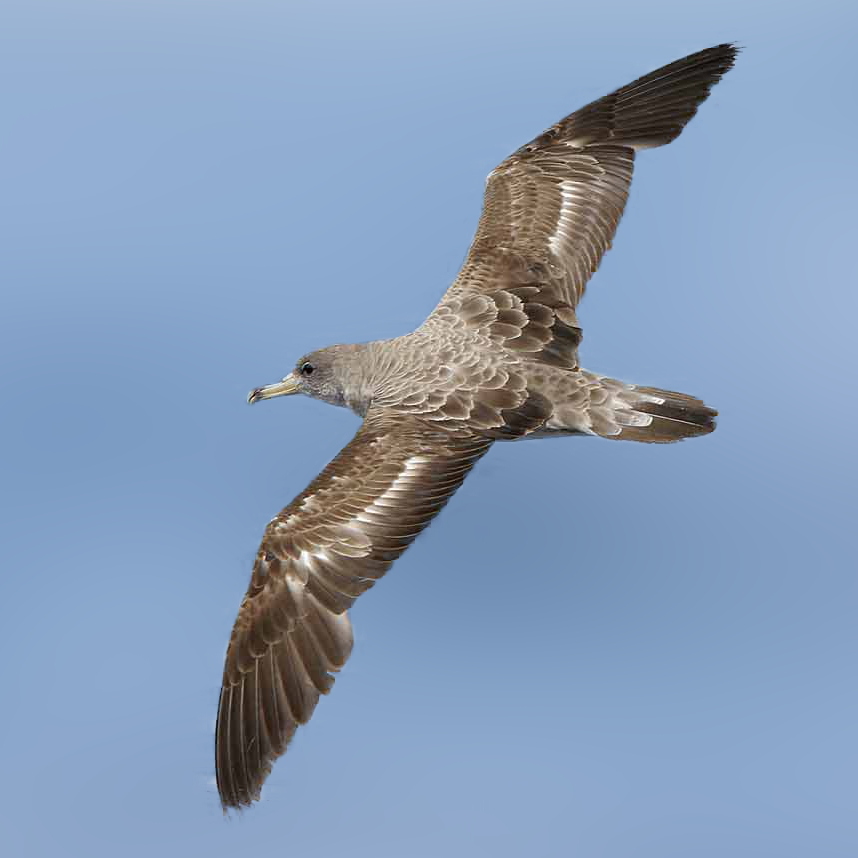
- Cory's shearwater in flight

Conservation status
- Least Concern (IUCN 3.1)

Scientific classification
- Kingdom: Animalia
- Phylum: Chordata
- Class: Aves
- Order: Procellariiformes
- Family: Procellariidae
- Genus: Calonectris
- Species: C. borealis

Binomial name
- Calonectris borealis (Cory, 1881)

= Cory's shearwater =

Species of bird

Cory's shearwater (Calonectris borealis) is a large shearwater in the seabird family Procellariidae. It breeds colonially on the archipelago of the Azores in the eastern Atlantic. Outside the breeding season it ranges widely in the Atlantic. It was formerly considered to be conspecific with Scopoli's shearwater.

== Taxonomy ==
Cory's shearwater was formally described in 1881 by the American ornithologist Charles B. Cory from a specimen collected off Chatham Island, Massachusetts. He coined the binomial name Puffinus borealis. Cory's shearwater is now placed in the genus Calonectris that was introduced in 1915 by the ornithologists Gregory Mathews and Tom Iredale. The genus name combines the Ancient Greek kalos meaning "good" or "noble" with the genus name Nectris that was used for shearwaters by the German naturalist Heinrich Kuhl in 1820. The name Nectris comes from the Ancient Greek word nēktris meaning "swimmer". The specific epithet borealis is Latin and means "north". The species is considered to be monotypic: no subspecies are recognised.

The Cape Verde shearwater C. edwardsii (Oustalet, 1883) was once considered a subspecies of Cory's shearwater but has been split off as a separate species (Snow, Perrins & Gillmor 1998). It is endemic to the Cape Verde Islands and has an all dark, slim bill, and darker head and upperparts than Cory's. The flight has been described as rather more typically shearwater-like than the Cory's, with stiffer and more rapid wing beats.

Scopoli's shearwater and Cory's shearwater were previously considered as conspecific. They formed the Cory's shearwater complex (Calonectris diomedea). Based on the lack of hybridization and differences in mitochondrial DNA, morphology and vocalization, the complex was split into two separate species. The English name "Cory's shearwater" was transferred to Calonectris borealis while what was previously the nominate subspecies became Scopoli's shearwater (Calonectris diomedea).

== Description ==
This shearwater is identifiable by its size, at 45–56 cm (18–22 in) in length and with a 112–126 cm (44–50 in) wingspan. It has brownish-grey upperparts, white underparts and a yellowish bill. It lacks the brown belly patch, dark shoulder markings and black cap of the great shearwater.

== Distribution and habitat ==
This species breeds on Madeira, the Azores and the Berlengas Archipelago in Portugal and the Canary Islands in Spain.

== Behaviour and ecology ==
This bird flies with long glides, and always with wings bowed and angled slightly back, unlike the stiff, straight-winged flight of the similarly sized great shearwater.

=== Breeding ===
They nest on open ground or among rocks or less often in a burrow where one white egg is laid. The burrow is visited at night to minimise predation from large gulls. In late summer and autumn, most birds migrate into the Atlantic as far north as the south-western coasts of Great Britain and Ireland. They return to the Mediterranean in February. The biggest colony is located in Savage Islands, Madeira.

=== Food and feeding ===
Cory's shearwater feeds on fish, molluscs and offal, and can dive deep (15 m (49 ft) or more) in search of prey. It readily follows fishing boats, where it indulges in noisy squabbles. This is a gregarious species, which can be seen in large numbers from ships or appropriate headlands. The Bay of Biscay ferries are particularly good for this species. It is silent at sea, but at night the breeding colonies are alive with raucous cackling calls.

== Gallery ==
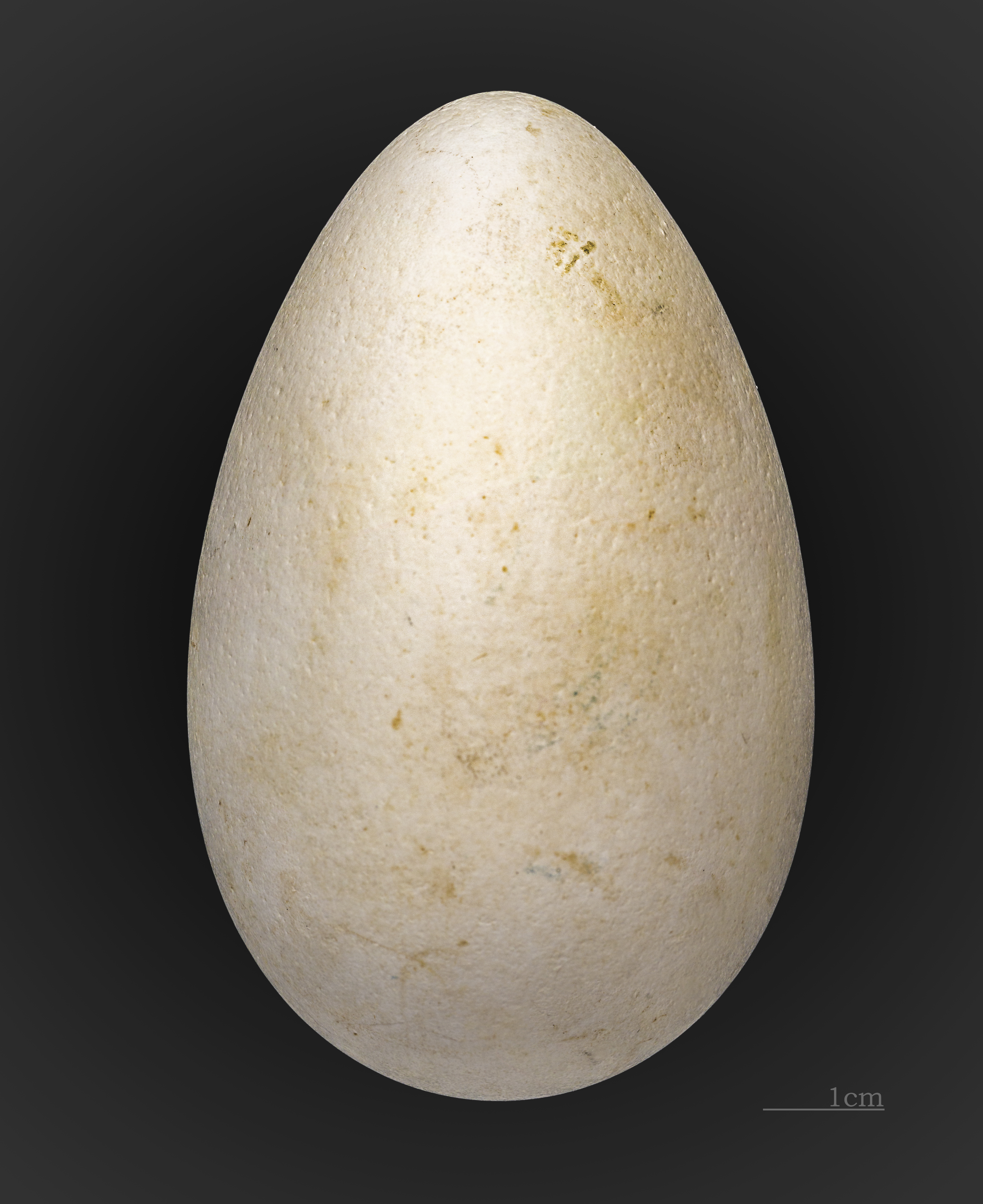
Egg from MHNT

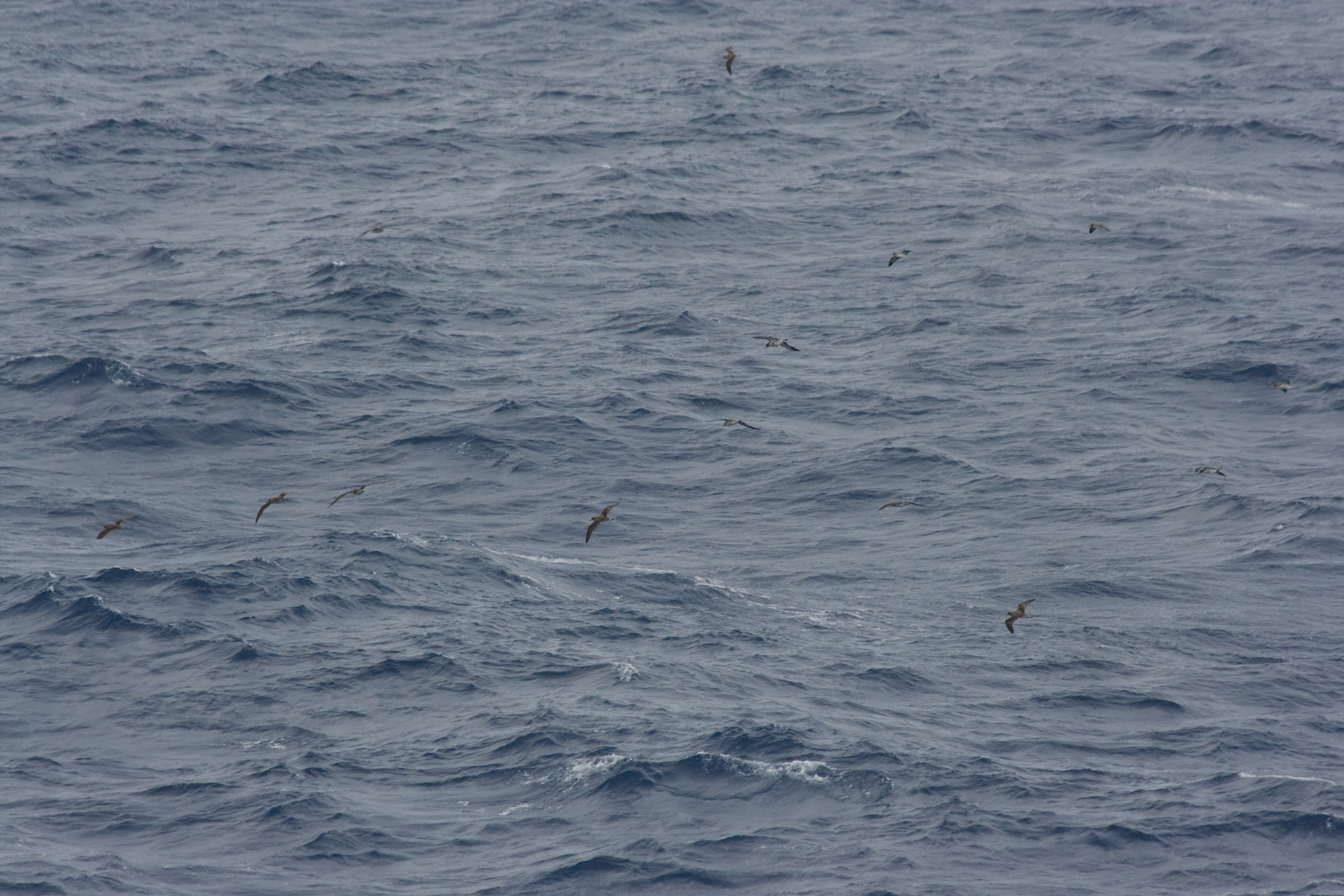
A group 200 nm east of Madeira

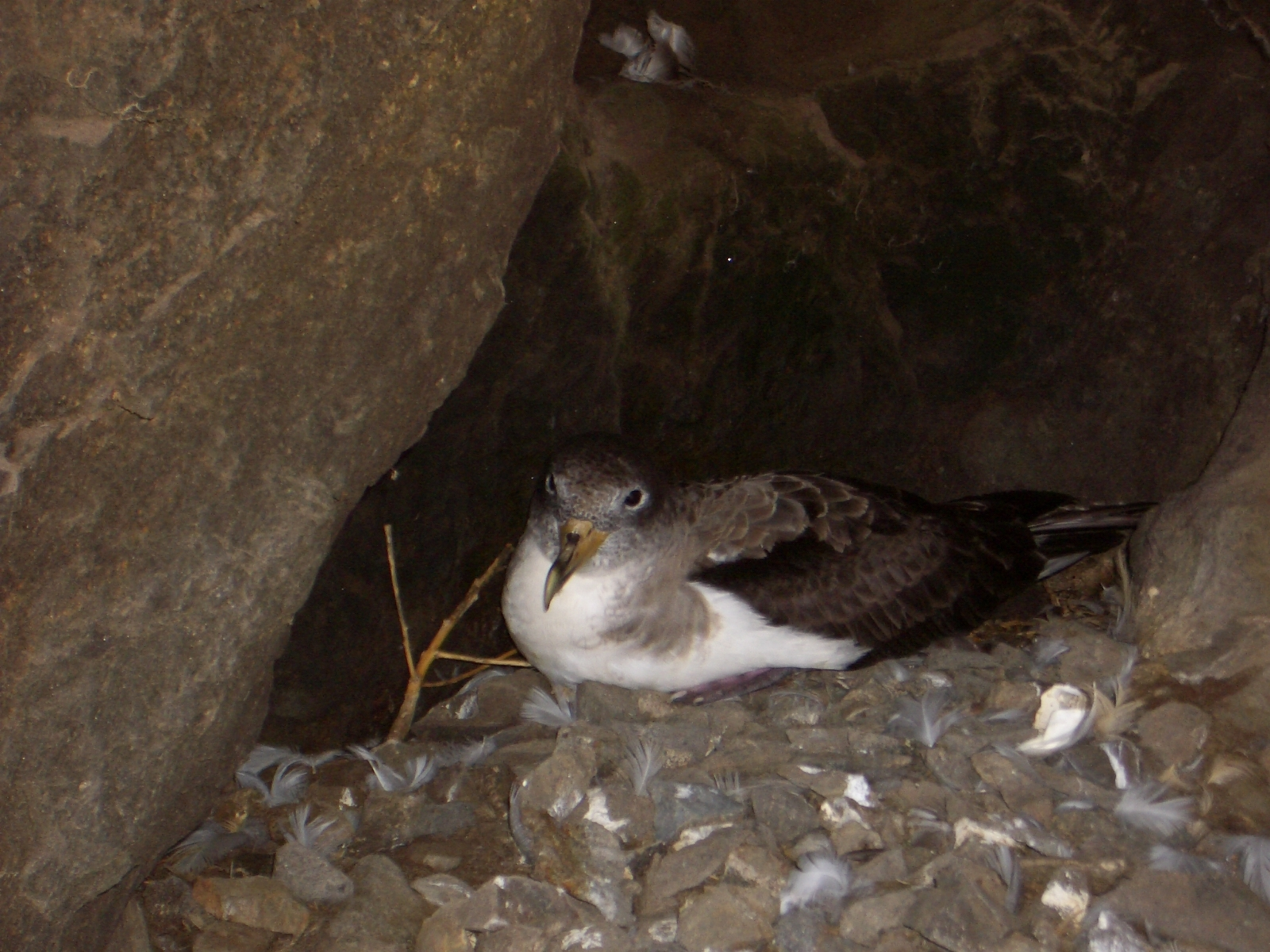
Nest site on Selvagem Pequena Island

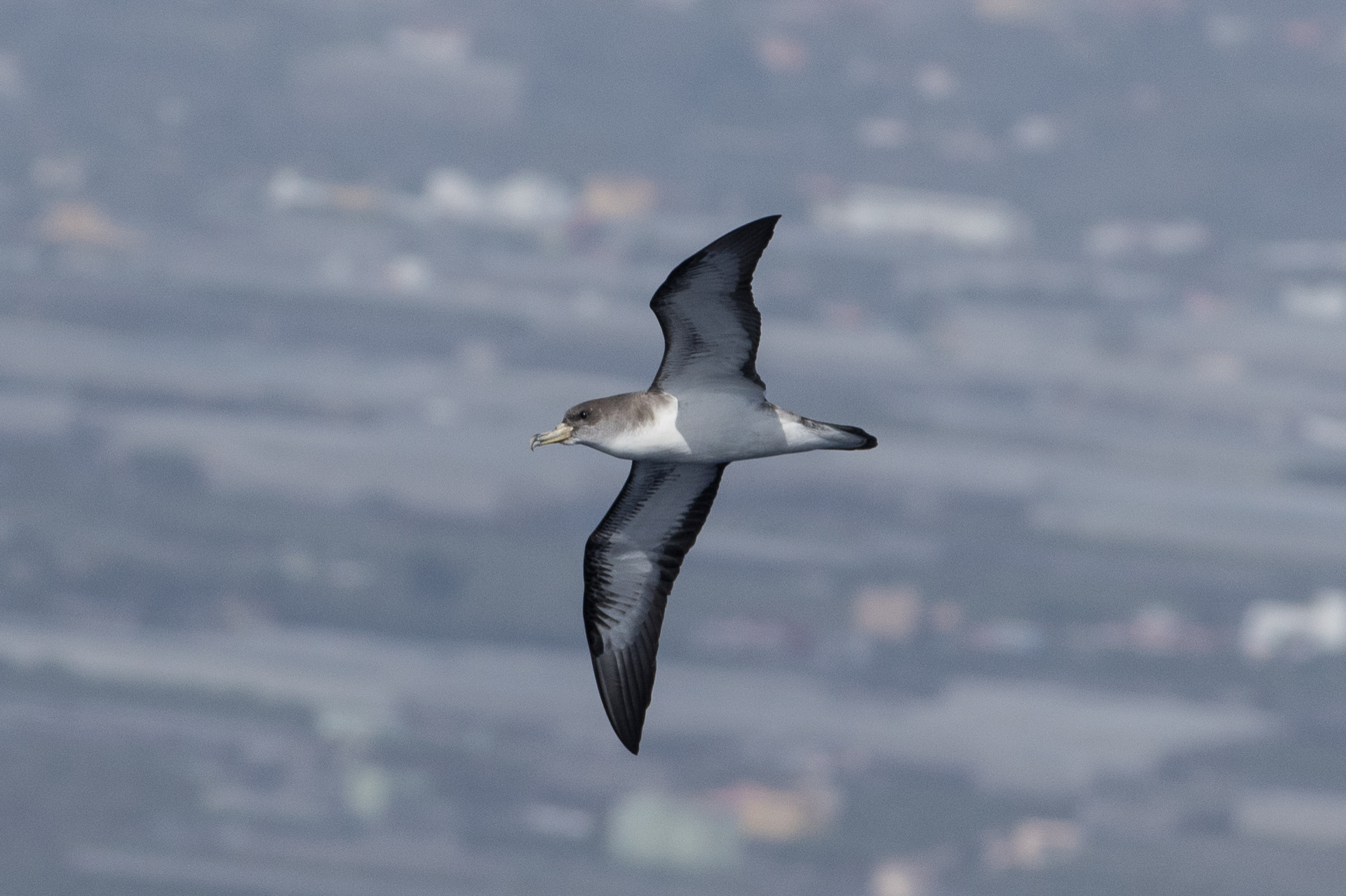
Cory's Shearwater in flight

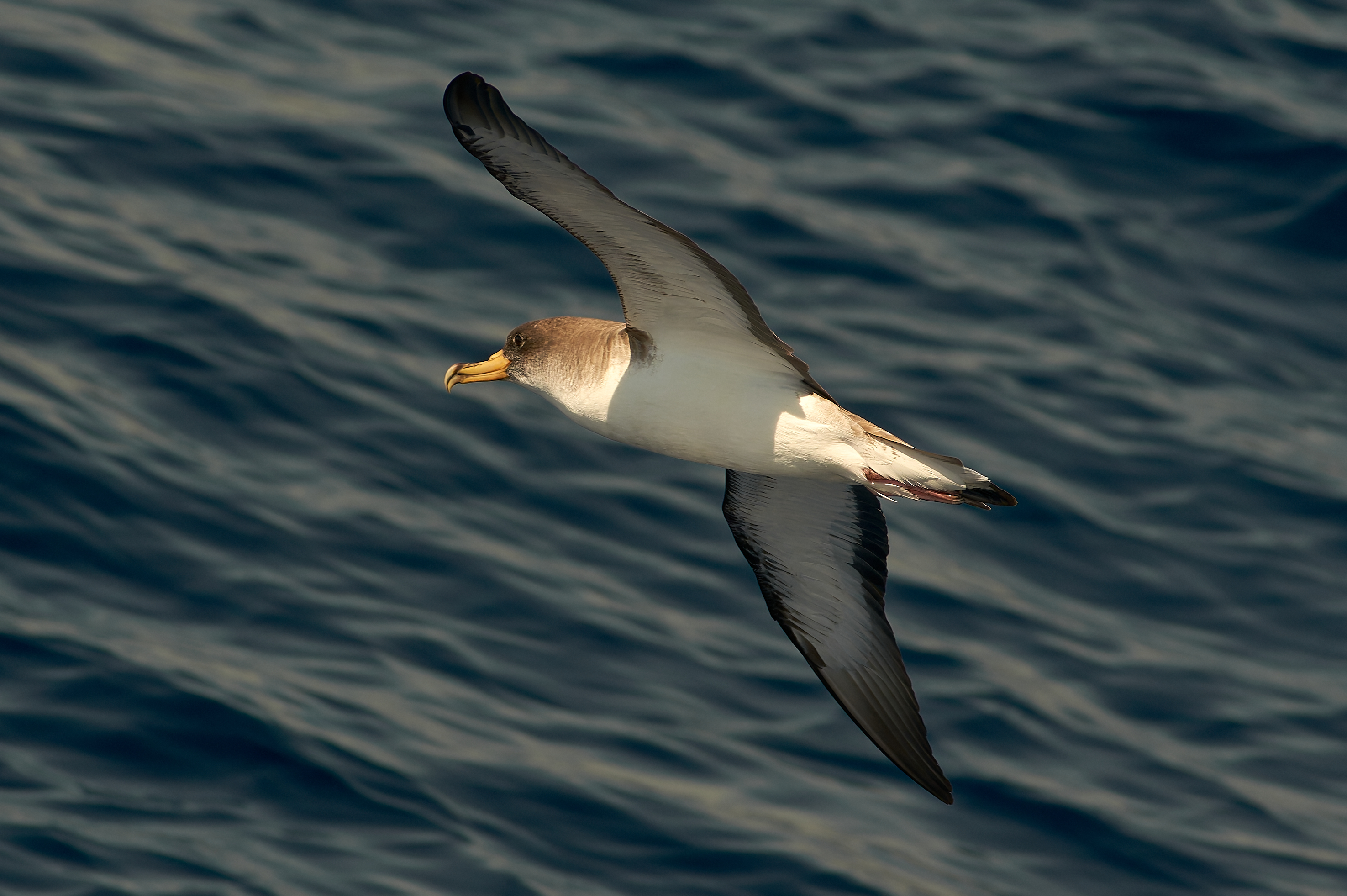
La Gomera

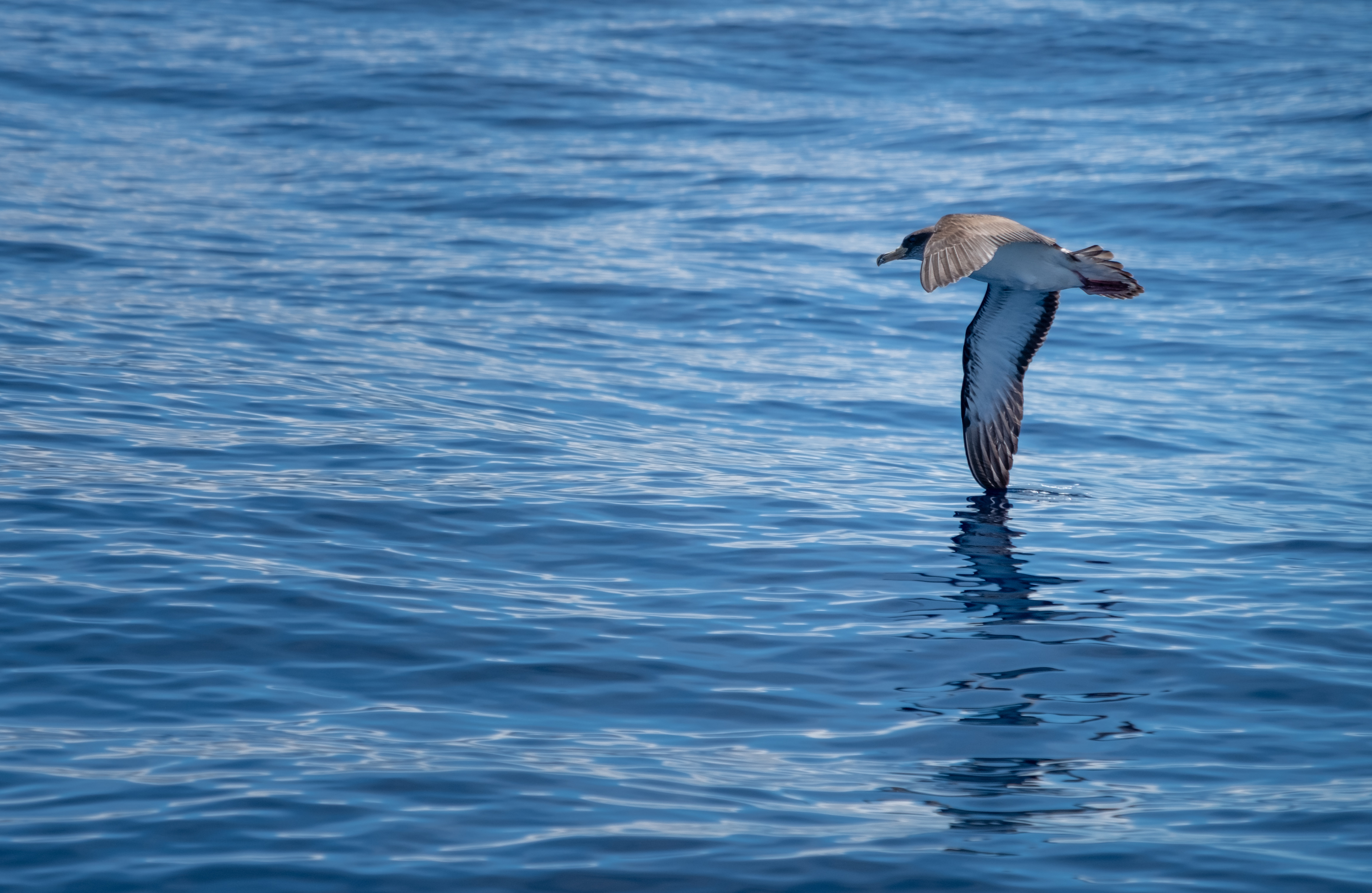
Corvo, Azores
