= List of marine game fish =

This is a list of marine fish pursued by recreational anglers.

- Albacore
- African pompano
- African red snapper
- African threadfish
- Arctic char (anadromous)
- Atlantic bonito
- Atlantic cod
- Atlantic goliath grouper
- Atlantic halibut
- Atlantic sailfish
- Atlantic salmon (anadromous)
- Atlantic Spanish mackerel
- Atlantic tarpon
- Australasian snapper
- Bar jack
- Barcheek trevally
- Barramundi
- Bigeye trevally
- Bigeye tuna
- Black-banded trevally
- Black drum
- Blackfin seabass
- Blackfin tuna
- Black grouper
- Black marlin
- Black skipjack
- Blacktip shark
- Blacktip trevally
- Bludger
- Bluefish
- Blue marlin
- Blue shark
- Blue trevally
- Bluefin trevally
- Bluefin tuna
- Bluespotted trevally
- Bonefish
- Bonnethead shark
- Brassy trevally
- Broomtail grouper
- Brownback trevally
- Bumpnose trevally
- California corbina
- California halibut
- California yellowtail
- Cape horse mackerel
- Cero
- Chinook salmon (anadromous)
- Chum salmon (anadromous)
- Cleftbelly trevally
- Coachwhip trevally
- Coastal trevally
- Cobia
- Cocinero
- Coho salmon (anadromous)
- Common dentex
- Common snook (Atlantic snook)
- Cottonmouth jack
- Crevalle jack
- Cubera snapper
- Dogtooth tuna
- Dolly Varden trout (anadromous)
- Doublespotted queenfish
- Dusky flathead
- European conger
- European pollock
- European seabass
- Fat snook
- Florida pompano
- Gag grouper
- Galjoen
- Giant African threadfin
- Giant sea bass
- Giant trevally
- Gilt-head bream
- Golden trevally
- Greater amberjack
- Great barracuda
- Green jack
- Greenback horse mackerel
- Guinean barracuda
- Hairfin lookdown
- Hammerhead shark
- Hardhead catfish
- Hogfish
- Horse-eye jack
- Imposter trevally
- Indian threadfish
- Island trevally
- Japanese amberjack
- Japanese jack mackerel
- Japanese seabass
- Jolthead porgy
- Kahawai (Australian salmon)
- Kawakawa
- Kelp bass
- King mackerel
- King threadfin
- Ladyfish
- Lane snapper
- Leerfish
- Lingcod
- Little tunny
- Longfin crevalle jack
- Longfin trevally
- Longfin yellowtail (Almaco jack)
- Longnose trevally
- Longrakered trevally
- Longtail tuna
- Mahi-mahi (Dolphinfish)
- Mako shark
- Malabar trevally
- Mangrove snapper (Grey snapper)
- Meagre
- Mediterranean horse mackerel
- Mexican barracuda
- Milkfish
- Mullet snapper
- Mutton snapper
- Narrow-barred Spanish mackerel
- Nassau grouper
- Needlescaled queenfish
- Opah
- Orange-spotted trevally
- Pacific bonito
- Pacific cod
- Pacific crevalle jack
- Pacific halibut
- Pacific jack mackerel
- Pacific sailfish
- Pacific sierra
- Pacific snook
- Papuan black snapper
- Permit
- Pink salmon (anadromous)
- Pollock (Coalfish)
- Porbeagle shark
- Rainbow runner
- Red drum
- Red grouper
- Red porgy (Madai)
- Red snapper
- Red steenbras
- Roosterfish
- Samson fish
- Scotsman seabream
- Shadow trevally
- Sheepshead
- Silver trevally
- Skipjack tuna
- Smallmouth scad
- Smallspotted grunter
- Snubnose pompano
- Sockeye salmon (anadromous)
- Southern pompano
- Southern yellowtail
- Spearfish
- Spotted seatrout
- Striped bass
- Striped marlin
- Summer flounder
- Swordfish
- Talang queenfish
- Tarpon
- Threadfin jack
- Thresher shark
- Tiger grouper
- Tiger shark
- Tille trevally
- Tope shark
- Torpedo scad
- Tripletail
- Wahoo
- Warsaw grouper
- Weakfish
- West coast seabream
- Whitefin trevally
- White marlin
- White seabass
- White sturgeon
- White trevally
- Yelloweye rockfish
- Yellow jack
- Yellowfin grouper
- Yellowfin tuna
- Yellowmouth grouper
- Yellowspotted trevally
- Yellowtail scad
- Yellowtail snapper

== See also ==
- Game fish
- List of freshwater game fish
