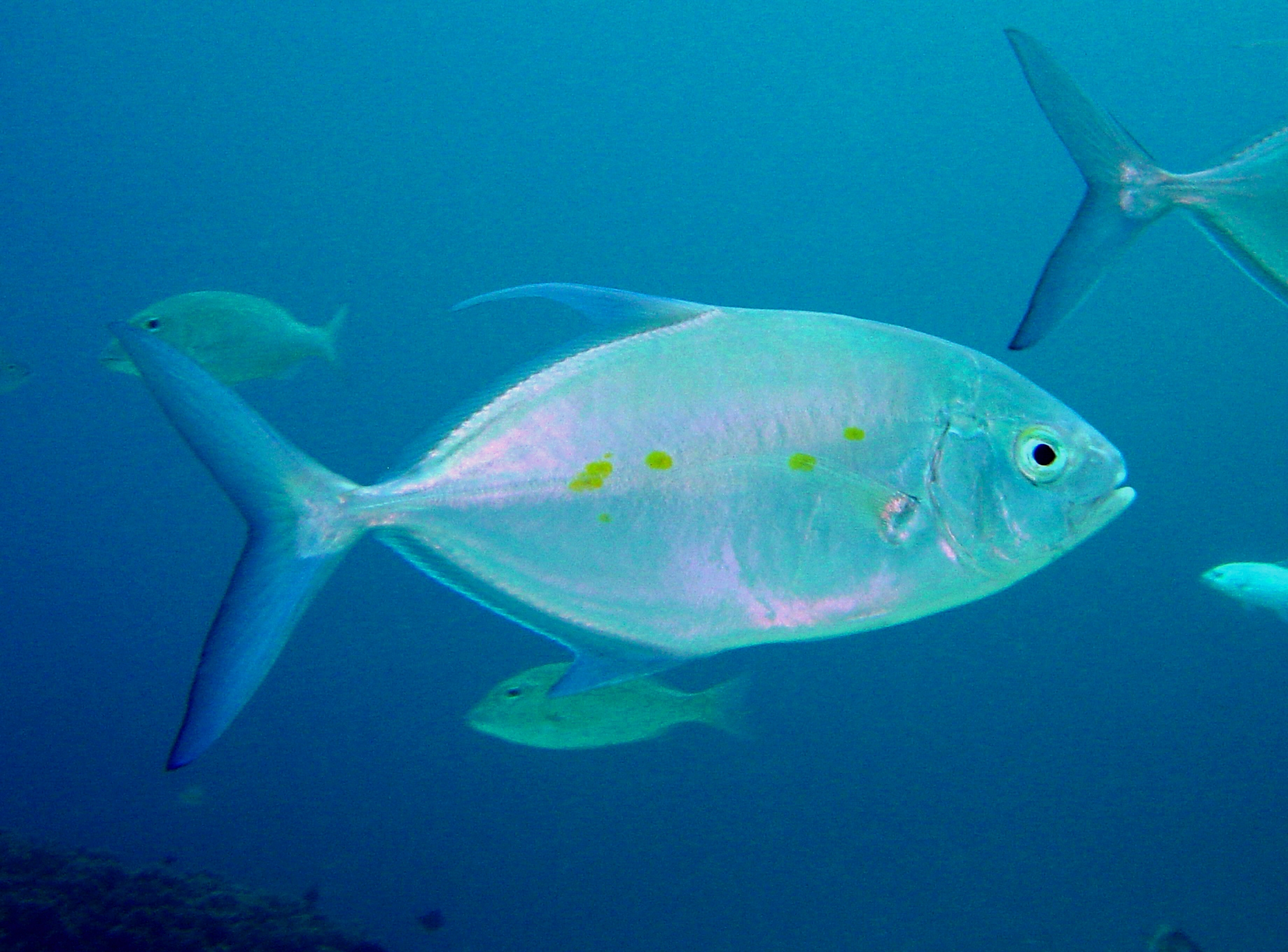
- The island trevally, Carangoides orthogrammus

Scientific classification
- Kingdom: Animalia
- Phylum: Chordata
- Class: Actinopterygii
- Division: Teleostei
- Order: Carangiformes
- Suborder: Carangoidei
- Family: Carangidae
- Subfamily: Caranginae
- Genus: Carangoides; Bleeker, 1851

Type species
- Caranx praeustus Anonymous [Bennett], 1830

Species
- See text for species

Synonyms
- Olistus Cuvier, 1829; Carangichthys Bleeker, 1802; Kaiwarinus Suzuki, 1962; Turrum Whitley, 1932; Xurel Jordan and Evermann, 1927; Elaphrotoxon Fowler, 1905; Ferdauia Jordan, Evermann & Wakiya, 1927

= Carangoides =

Genus of fishes

Carangoides is a genus of tropical to subtropical marine fishes in the jack family, Carangidae. They are small- to large-sized, deep-bodied fish characterised by a certain gill raker and jaw morphology, often appearing very similar to jacks in the genus Caranx. They inhabit the subtropical and tropical regions of the Indian, Pacific, and Atlantic Oceans, often occupying coastal areas, including reefs, bays, and estuaries, rarely venturing far offshore. They are all predatory fishes, taking a variety of smaller fishes, crustaceans and cephalopods as prey. The genus was first erected in 1851 by Pieter Bleeker for an unknown taxon and currently contains 20 species. Many make up significant proportions of various fisheries, although a number of ciguatera cases have been attributed to them.

== Taxonomy ==
The genus Carangoides is one of 31 genera in the jack and horse mackerel family, the Carangidae are part of the order Carangiformes. A number of recent phylogenetic studies on the family has placed Carangoides in the subfamily Caranginae (or tribe Carangini), being most closely related to the genera Alectis, Atropus, Selene, and Uraspis.

Carangoides was created by Pieter Bleeker in 1851 to accommodate a species of carangid fish, although the species he created the genus for is unknown. To rectify this, Caranx praeustus was selected to be the type species of the genus. Carangid classification was initially very difficult, with many genera and species described, many of which were synonymous. Later reviews of the family eventually placed 21 species into Carangoides, leaving a number of genera synonymous with it. Carangoides takes priority over these other genera because its type species, Caranx praeustus, was described by an unknown author before the other species and genera were erected. The species of the genus are often referred to as jacks or trevallies, and sometimes more specifically as 'island jacks'. The name Carangoides is derived from the French carangue, meaning 'fish of the Caribbean'.

== Species ==
The currently recognized species in this genus are:

Image	Scientific name	Common name	Distribution
	Carangoides armatus (Rüppell, 1830)	longfin trevally	the Indo-Pacific, ranging from South Africa in the west to Japan in the east
	Carangoides bajad (Forsskål, 1775)	orange-spotted trevally	Indo-Pacific, ranging from Madagascar in the west to Japan
	Carangoides chrysophrys (G. Cuvier, 1833)	longnose trevally	Indian and west Pacific Oceans from South Africa to New Zealand and Japan
	Carangoides ciliarius (Rüppell, 1830)	likely C. armatus	Massawa in the Red Sea.
	Carangoides coeruleopinnatus (Rüppell, 1830)	coastal trevally	the Indian and west Pacific Oceans, from South Africa in the west to Japan and New Caledonia in the east, reaching as far south as Australia.
	Carangoides dinema Bleeker, 1851	shadow trevally	the Indian and west Pacific Oceans, from South Africa in the west to Japan and Samoa in the east, reaching as far south as Indonesia and New Caledonia.
	Carangoides equula (Temminck & Schlegel, 1844)	whitefin trevally	the Indo-Pacific and central Pacific, ranging from South Africa in the west to Hawaii in the east.
	Carangoides ferdau (Forsskål, 1775)	blue trevally	Indo-Pacific and central Pacific regions, ranging from South Africa in the west to Hawaii in the east.
	Carangoides fulvoguttatus (Forsskål, 1775)	goldspotted trevally	western Indo-Pacific region, from South Africa in the west to Japan and Australia in the east.
	Carangoides gymnostethus (G. Cuvier, 1833)	bludger	Indo-west Pacific Ocean, distributed from South Africa in the west to Japan and New Caledonia in the east.
	Carangoides hedlandensis (Whitley, 1934)	bumpnose trevally	the Indo-west Pacific region, ranging from South Africa in the west to Japan and Samoa in the east.
	Carangoides humerosus (McCulloch, 1915)	duskyshoulder trevally	eastern Indian and western Pacific Oceans, ranging from eastern India to northern Australia and Taiwan.
	Carangoides malabaricus (Bloch & Schneider, 1801)	Malabar trevally	Indian and west Pacific Oceans from South Africa in the west to Japan and Australia
	Carangoides oblongus (G. Cuvier, 1833)	coachwhip trevally	Indo-west Pacific region, ranging from South Africa in the west to Fiji and Japan in the east
	Carangoides orthogrammus (D. S. Jordan & C. H. Gilbert, 1882)	island trevally	Indian and Pacific Oceans, ranging from Mozambique and the Seychelles in the west to Hawaii and the Revillagigedo Islands in the central and eastern Pacific
	Carangoides otrynter (D. S. Jordan & C. H. Gilbert, 1883)	threadfin jack	eastern Pacific Ocean from Baja California in the north to Ecuador and the Galapagos Islands in the south.
	Carangoides plagiotaenia Bleeker, 1857	barcheek trevally	the Indo-west Pacific region, ranging from South Africa in the west to Japan, Australia and a number of small central Pacific islands in the east.
	Carangoides praeustus (Anonymous [ E. T. Bennett ], 1830)	brownback trevally	the Indo-west Pacific region, ranging from the Persian Gulf east to India, South East Asia and the Indonesian islands.
	Carangoides talamparoides Bleeker, 1852	imposter trevally	Indian and west Pacific oceans, from the Gulf of Oman in the west to Japan and Australia in the east

== Description ==
In their general morphology, the species of Carangoides are very similar to a number of other carangid genera, especially Caranx. They grow to a range of sizes, most attaining a length less than 50 cm (20 in), but with the largest fish of the genus reaching at least 1 m and over 65 kg in weight. They have a relatively deep, compressed body, with the dorsal profile usually far more convex than the ventral, with a tapering posterior. The dorsal fin is in two parts, the first consisting of spines, and the second of one or two spines followed by a number of soft rays. The anal fin has detached spines preceding a long soft ray section headed by up to two spines. The caudal fin is large and forked and the pectoral fin is large, usually longer than the head. All species have scutes on the posterior section of their lateral lines.

The genus is defined as having gill rakers of normal length and shape, with a total number of gill rakers between 21 and 37 on the first gill arch. Both upper and lower jaws have a band of teeth present and the breast is naked ventrally to completely scaled.

The species are often dull in coloration, mostly being silver, getting darker dorsally and lighter ventrally. Often, they have green or blue tinges to their bodies, but fade rapidly after death. A few, such as the orange-spotted trevally, have far more brilliant coloration, incorporating bright orange and yellow spotting. The fins are usually hyaline to grey, and occasionally blue or yellow.

== Distribution and habitat ==
The Carangoides species are distributed throughout the tropical and subtropical oceans of the world, occupying the Pacific, Indian, and Atlantic Oceans. They occur on the coastlines of countries in this range, although are most prolific in the Indo-Pacific region, having high species densities around Southeast Asia, Indonesia, and northern Australia.

Most species are coastal in nature, inhabiting continental shelf marine environments including reefs, bays, sandflats, lagoons, and even estuaries.

== Biology and fisheries ==
An angler's catch of yellow jack, Carangoides bartholomaei

The Carangoides species are mostly schooling in nature, becoming more solitary with age. They are all predatory, taking a variety of fish, cephalopods, and crustaceans. Like all of the Carangidae, they are oviparous, do not guard their eggs, and (if known) display differing reproductive traits and timing between species.

All of the species are of minor to significant importance to fisheries, with some also being of interest to recreational fishermen. Like all jacks and trevallies, they can be caught on a variety of baits and lures, and with some members reaching 1 m in length, are considered formidable game fish. They are generally considered to be excellent to fair table fare, although a number of ciguatera poisonings have been linked to the species of this genus. As with all tropical fish, consuming smaller fish carries a lesser risk of being affected by the disease, with larger fish having accumulated more of the toxin.
