= Bludger =

Bludger may refer to:

- Bludger (fish), a tropical to subtropical fish
- Bludger (Quidditch), a type of ball used in the game Quidditch in the fictional Harry Potter universe
- Bludger, Australian slang for a lazy person
