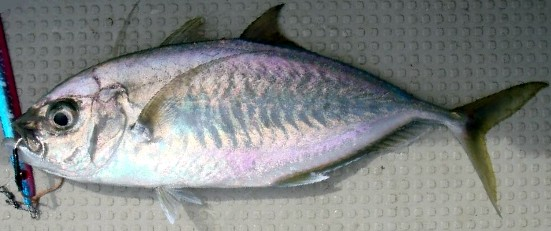

Conservation status
- Least Concern (IUCN 3.1)

Scientific classification
- Kingdom: Animalia
- Phylum: Chordata
- Class: Actinopterygii
- Order: Carangiformes
- Suborder: Carangoidei
- Family: Carangidae
- Genus: Craterognathus; Kimura, Takeuchi & Yadome, 2022
- Species: C. plagiotaenia

Binomial name
- Craterognathus plagiotaenia (Bleeker, 1857)
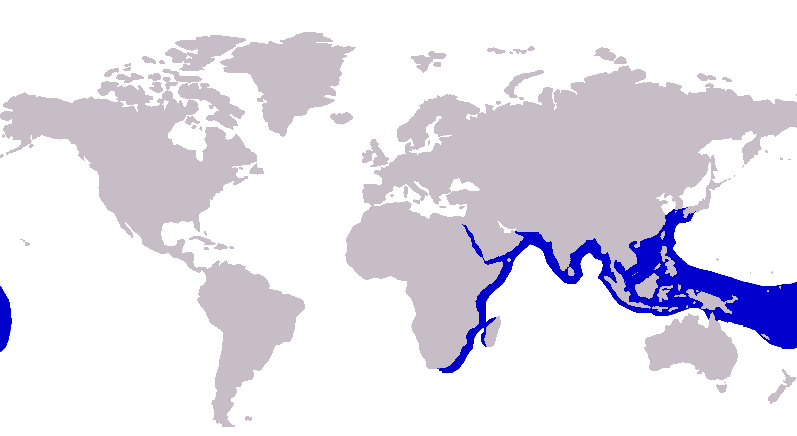
- Approximate range of the barcheek trevally

Synonyms
- Carangoides plagiotaenia Bleeker, 1857; Caranx plagiotaenia (Bleeker, 1857); Caranx vomerinus Playfair, 1867; Caranx brevicarinatus Klunzinger, 1871; Caranx compressus Day, 1871

= Barcheek trevally =

Species of fish

The barcheek trevally (Craterognathus plagiotaenia), also known as the barcheek kingfish, shortridge trevally or oblique-banded trevally, is a species of moderately large marine fish of the jack family Carangidae. The barcheek trevally is distributed throughout the tropical waters of the Indo-west Pacific region, ranging from South Africa in the west to Japan, Australia and a number of small central Pacific islands in the east. The species inhabits inshore and offshore waters, found along the slopes of lagoons and out to deeper reefs on the continental shelf, where it preys on small fish and benthic crustaceans. It is a moderately large fish, growing to a maximum recorded length of 50 cm (20 in), and can be distinguished from similar species by its somewhat protruding lower jaw and the dark banding on its operculum. It is of minor importance to fisheries throughout its range, taken by trawling, hook and line methods and various inshore fish netting methods.

== Taxonomy and naming ==
The barcheek trevally is the only species in Craterognathus, which falls into the jack and horse mackerel family Carangidae, the Carangidae are part of the order Carangiformes.

The species was first scientifically described by the Dutch ichthyologist Pieter Bleeker in 1857 based on a specimen taken from Ambon Island in Indonesia, which was designated to be the holotype. Bleeker named this new species Carangoides plagiotaenia, placing the species in what is considered to be a wastebasket taxon, while later revisions transferred it to the genus Caranx which was later considered to be an invalid move. Finally, it was allocated to a monospecific genus in 2002. The species was redescribed three times after its initial naming, with all these subsequent names considered to be invalid junior synonyms under ICZN nomenclature rules. The specific epithet plagiotaenia means 'oblique band' in Greek, and this reflects in one of the species common names, which is also applied to the coachwhip trevally. The names 'barcheek trevally' and 'shortridge trevally' refer to distinctive aspects of the species appearance.

== Description ==
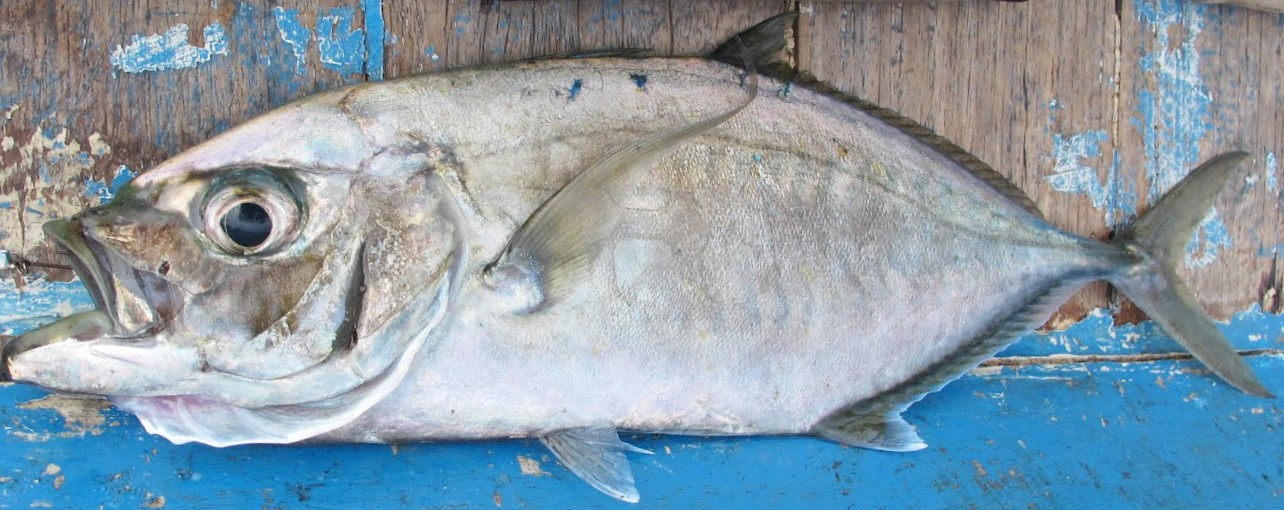
The narrow black bar on the operculum is characteristic of the species

The barcheek trevally is a moderately large fish, growing to a maximum recorded length of 50 cm (20 in). It is easily recognized due to its slightly protruding lower jaw and 'barred cheek' colouration. Its general shape is similar to most other species, having a compressed oblong body, with the dorsal and ventral profiles equally convex, although in large specimens, the dorsal profile of the head is nearly straight. The dorsal fin is in two parts, the first with 8 spines and the second with 1 spine and 22 to 24 soft rays, with the lobe of this second fin shorter than the head length. The anal fin has 2 anteriorly detached spines followed by 1 spine and 18 to 20 soft rays. The lateral line has a low anterior arch, with this curved section being longer than the posterior straight section. The straight section contains 20 to 26 scales followed by 11 to 18 small scutes. The breast is completely scaled. The lower jaw is enlarged and slightly protrudes beyond the upper jaw, with both jaws having bands of small teeth present. There are 27 to 40 gill rakers in total and 24 vertebrae.

The barcheek trevally is a silvery colour, being more grey above and becoming paler below, with 6 or 7 dusky oblique bands occasionally present above the midline. The species common name is due to a black margin on the preopercle, giving a 'barred cheek' appearance, with no dusky spot further back on the operculum. Large adults are also known to occasionally have small yellow spots scattered on their sides. The caudal, second dorsal and anal fins are dusky to dark, with the leading edge of the pelvic fins and distal margin of the anal fin white. The pectoral fins are pale.

== Distribution and habitat ==
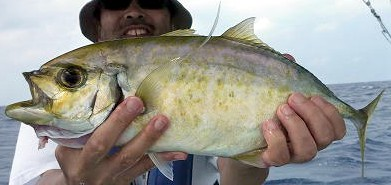
The barcheek trevally is occasionally taken by anglers

The barcheek trevally is distributed throughout the tropical and subtropical waters of the Indian and west Pacific Oceans. It ranges from South Africa north to the Red Sea, but is absent from the Persian Gulf, extending east to India and South East Asia. Its range extends south to Cape York in Queensland, Australia, and extends into the Pacific Ocean as far as the Marshall Islands, Fiji and Samoa. The northernmost capture of the barcheek trevally was reported off southern Japan.

The barcheek trevally appears to be largely confined to lagoon and outer reef environments, often found in the shallow water adjacent to deep drop-offs in these settings. It also inhabits deeper offshore coral and rocky reef environments.

== Biology and fishery ==
The barcheek trevally travels either singularly or in small shoals, and is a fast swimming predator, taking small fish and benthic crustaceans as a main source of prey. Nothing is known of its reproduction or growth patterns.

The barcheek trevally is of very little importance to fisheries throughout its range, occasionally taken as bycatch in other fisheries or taken in small artisanal catches. It is caught on hook and line gear as well as trawls and various inshore fish traps. It is occasionally caught by recreational fishermen while bottom fishing on reefs.
