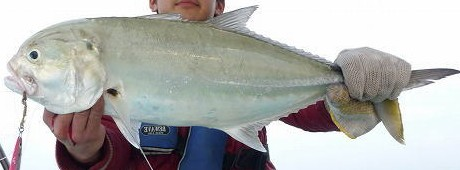

Conservation status
- Least Concern (IUCN 3.1)

Scientific classification
- Kingdom: Animalia
- Phylum: Chordata
- Class: Actinopterygii
- Order: Carangiformes
- Suborder: Carangoidei
- Family: Carangidae
- Genus: Caranx
- Species: C. tille

Binomial name
- Caranx tille G. Cuvier, 1833
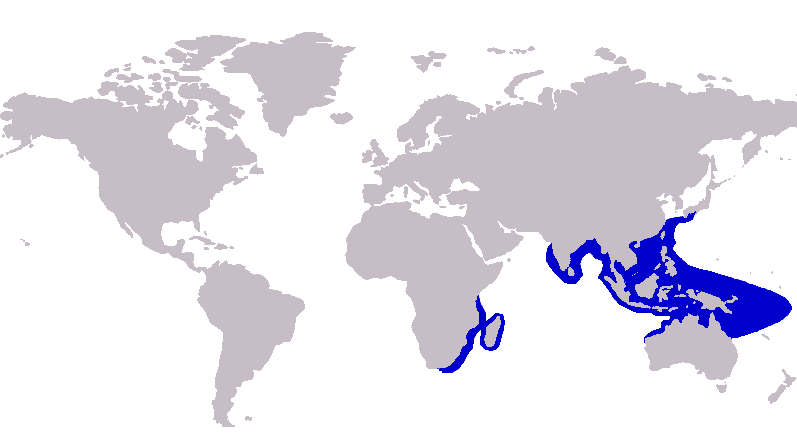
- Approximate range of the tille trevally

Synonyms
- Caranx cynodon Bleeker, 1851

= Tille trevally =

Species of fish

The tille trevally (Caranx tille), also known as the tille kingfish, is a species of large marine fish classified in the jack family, Carangidae. The tille trevally is distributed through the tropical and subtropical waters of the Indo-Pacific region, ranging from South Africa in the west to Fiji, Japan and Australia in the east. The species is best distinguished by its rounded, strongly convex anterior profile, with other detailed anatomical features also useful. The tille trevally reaches a maximum length of 80 cm and a weight of 7.2 kg. It is predominantly an inshore species, inhabiting coastal reef and lagoon environments, although has been recorded on deep offshore seamounts. It is a predatory fish, taking various species of fish and crustaceans as prey, with little known of its reproductive cycle. It is of minor importance to fisheries throughout its range, taken by hook and line, gill nets and purse seines. The tille trevally is also considered a good game fish, and an excellent table fish. The species acquired its scientific and common names from a local name used by Pondicherry fishermen, koton tille, which Georges Cuvier then used when he named the species in 1833.

== Taxonomy and naming ==
The tille trevally is classified within the genus Caranx, one of a number of groups known as the jacks or trevallies. Caranx itself is part of the larger jack and horse mackerel family Carangidae, which in turn is part of the order Carangiformes.

The species was first scientifically described by Georges Cuvier in 1833 based on the holotype specimen collected from Pondicherry, India. He named the species Caranx tille, with the specific epithet derived from a local name used by fishermen for the species in Pondicherry, koton tille. Cuvier noted that Jean Baptiste Leschenault, who collected the species, expressed doubt over the validity of the new species despite local fishermen identifying it as separate to other trevallies. The species was independently redescribed three times; the first was by Pieter Bleeker in 1851 as Caranx cynodon, the second time by Henry Weed Fowler in 1904 as Caranx semisomnus, and lastly as Caranx auriga by Alvin Seale in 1910. The latter name caused a specific homonym with Caranx auriga, a name proposed for a different species by Charles Walter De Vis in 1884. To rectify this, William Ogilby proposed the name Citula virga as a replacement, while Roxas and Martin proposed Caranx manilensis. All these names were soon recognized as synonymous with Caranx tille, and are now considered invalid junior synonyms under ICZN rules.

== Description ==
The tille trevally is a large species, growing to a maximum known length of 80 cm and a recorded weight of 7.3 kg. It is similar in general appearance to most jacks in the genus, having a compressed, oblong body, with the dorsal profile more convex than the ventral profile, particularly anteriorly. This curvature gives the fish a discernibly 'blunt' head and steep snout, which is the most obvious identifying feature of the species. The dorsal fin is in two distinct sections; the first consists of eight spine and the second of one spine and 20 to 22 soft rays. The anal fin consists of two anteriorly detached spines followed by one spine and 16 to 18 soft rays, while the pelvic fins have one spine followed by 18 soft rays. The lateral line is moderately arched anteriorly, with 53 to 54 scales in this section, while the straight section contains none to two scales and 33 to 42 strong scutes. The breast is completely scaled. The species has well-developed adipose eyelids, while its dentition consists of an outer row of widely spaced canines and an inner band of villiform teeth in the upper jaw, with a row of widely spaced conical teeth on the lower jaw. The tille trevally has 22 to 25 gill rakers and 24 vertebrae.

The tille trevally is generally a uniformly pale olive to silvery grey colour all over as a juvenile, with the fins being pale to dusky. As the fish becomes larger, the head and upper body become a darker olive green to bluish-grey colour, with the underside fading to a silvery white. The second dorsal fin is olive to black and lacks the white tip shown by Caranx papuensis, while the caudal and anal fins are yellow-olive to black. The species has a black spot on the upper opercular margin.

== Distribution and habitat ==
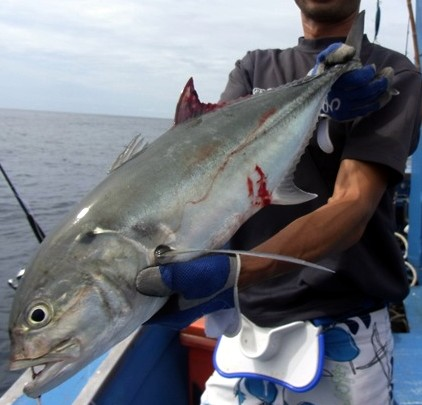
The smaller eye and colourless fins help distinguish the tille trevally from the bigeye trevally

The tille trevally is distributed through the tropical and subtropical waters of the Indian and west Pacific Oceans. In the western part of its range, the species distributed throughout South Africa and Madagascar waters north along the east African coast up to Tanzania, with an apparent break in its range from Tanzania to India. Its range continues from India east to South East Asia and the Indonesian Archipelago. The distribution extends south to northern Australia, north to Japan, and to Fiji in the east.

The tille trevally is typically an inshore species, preferentially inhabiting coastal coral and rocky reefs, as well as moving through sandy bays and lagoons. The species is known to move with the tide in the Solomon Islands, entering inner lagoon regions through tidal corridors as the tide rises, and exiting back to the outer reef as the tide falls. This is thought to be due to the fish following small prey fish into the lagoon, where these small species spawn. The species is also known to enter estuarine waters and the lower reaches of rivers. Despite being more prevalent in inshore waters, the tille trevally has also been recorded in far offshore waters, living on seamounts in West Mariana Ridge of the Pacific, where seamount peaks reach to 50 m from the surface. Here it occurs with other normally inshore fishes, and is one of the top predators in this ecosystem.

== Biology and fishery ==
The tille trevally's biology is poorly understood, with only basic aspects of its diet known. It is a predatory species which takes other fish and various crustaceans as prey. Known hunting movements have been described above, with it moving into shallow lagoons to hunt small baitfish which shelter and spawn in the mangroves at high tide. Reproduction and growth parameters are entirely unknown.

The tille trevally is of minor importance in most fisheries throughout its range, although it is locally important in some areas. One such fishery is in Wewak, Papua New Guinea, where it and three lutjanids made up 50% of the catch, with C. tille the predominant carangid in the fishery. It is taken by hook and line, gill nets, purse seines and various artisanal gear. According to Cuvier, the species is an excellent table fish, and is also considered a good gamefish in larger sizes.
