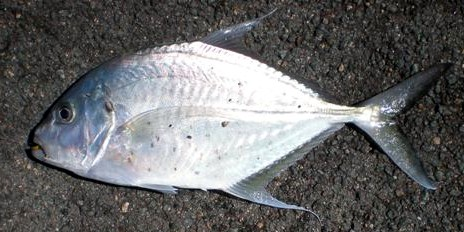

Conservation status
- Least Concern (IUCN 3.1)

Scientific classification
- Kingdom: Animalia
- Phylum: Chordata
- Class: Actinopterygii
- Order: Carangiformes
- Suborder: Carangoidei
- Family: Carangidae
- Genus: Carangoides
- Species: C. chrysophrys

Binomial name
- Carangoides chrysophrys (G. Cuvier, 1833)
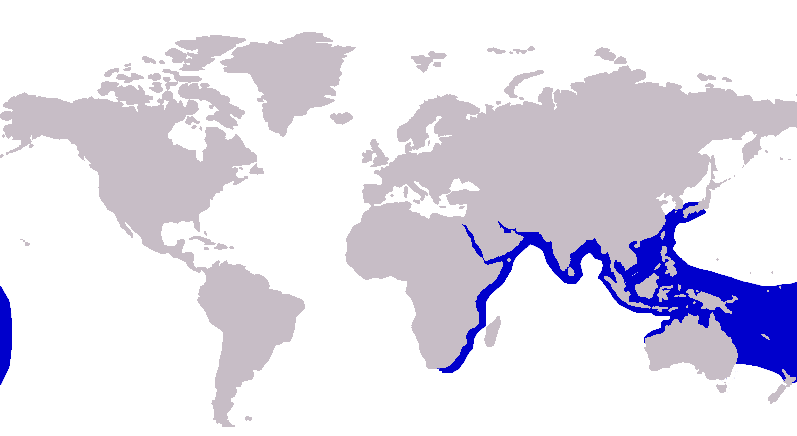
- Approximate range of the longnose trevally

Synonyms
- Caranx chrysophrys Cuvier, 1833; Citula chrysophrys (Cuvier, 1833); Carangoides chrysophryoides Bleeker, 1851; Caranx nigrescens Day, 1868; Caranx jayakari Boulenger, 1888; Caranx typus Gilchrist & Thompson, 1917

= Longnose trevally =

Species of fish

The longnose trevally (Carangoides chrysophrys), also known as the tea-leaf trevally, club-nosed trevally, grunting trevally or dusky trevally, is a species of inshore marine fish in the jack family, Carangidae. The species is distributed throughout the tropical and subtropical waters of the Indian and west Pacific Oceans from South Africa to New Zealand and Japan, inhabiting coastal waters, especially reefs, to a depth of 90 m. The longnose trevally is distinguished from similar species by a combination of a scaleless breast and the number of gill rakers and fin rays. It is a moderately large fish, growing to a maximum known length of 72 cm and 4.35 kg. The longnose trevally is a predatory fish, consuming small fish, crustaceans and molluscs. The species is of minor commercial importance throughout its range, and is considered to be a good table fish.

== Taxonomy and naming ==
The longnose trevally is classified within the genus Carangoides, a group of fish commonly called jacks and trevallies. Carangoides falls into the jack and horse mackerel family Carangidae, the Carangidae are part of the order Carangiformes.

The species was first scientifically described by the French taxonomist Georges Cuvier in 1833, based on the holotype specimen collected from the waters of the Seychelles. He named the new species Caranx chrysophrys, with the specific name meaning 'golden eyebrow' in Greek. The generic position of the species was revised twice, being placed in Citula by William Ogilby and finally into Carangoides by Ian Munro, where it has remained. The species has been independently described on a number of occasions, the first when Pieter Bleeker identified a fish he believed was similar, but not the same as Carangoides chrysophrys, and named it Carangoides chrysophryoides. Other synonyms include Caranx nigrescens, Caranx jayakari and Caranx typus. These are all considered to be junior synonyms under the ICZN rules and are no longer used. The species has a number of common names, with the most often used names, 'longnose trevally' (or 'longnose kingfish') and 'club-nosed trevally' in reference to the snout profile of the fish. The names 'dusky trevally' and 'grunting trevally' are used for the fish in the United States.

== Description ==
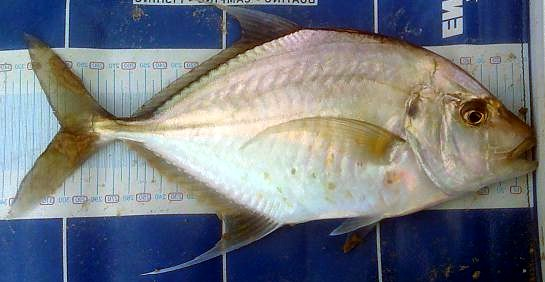

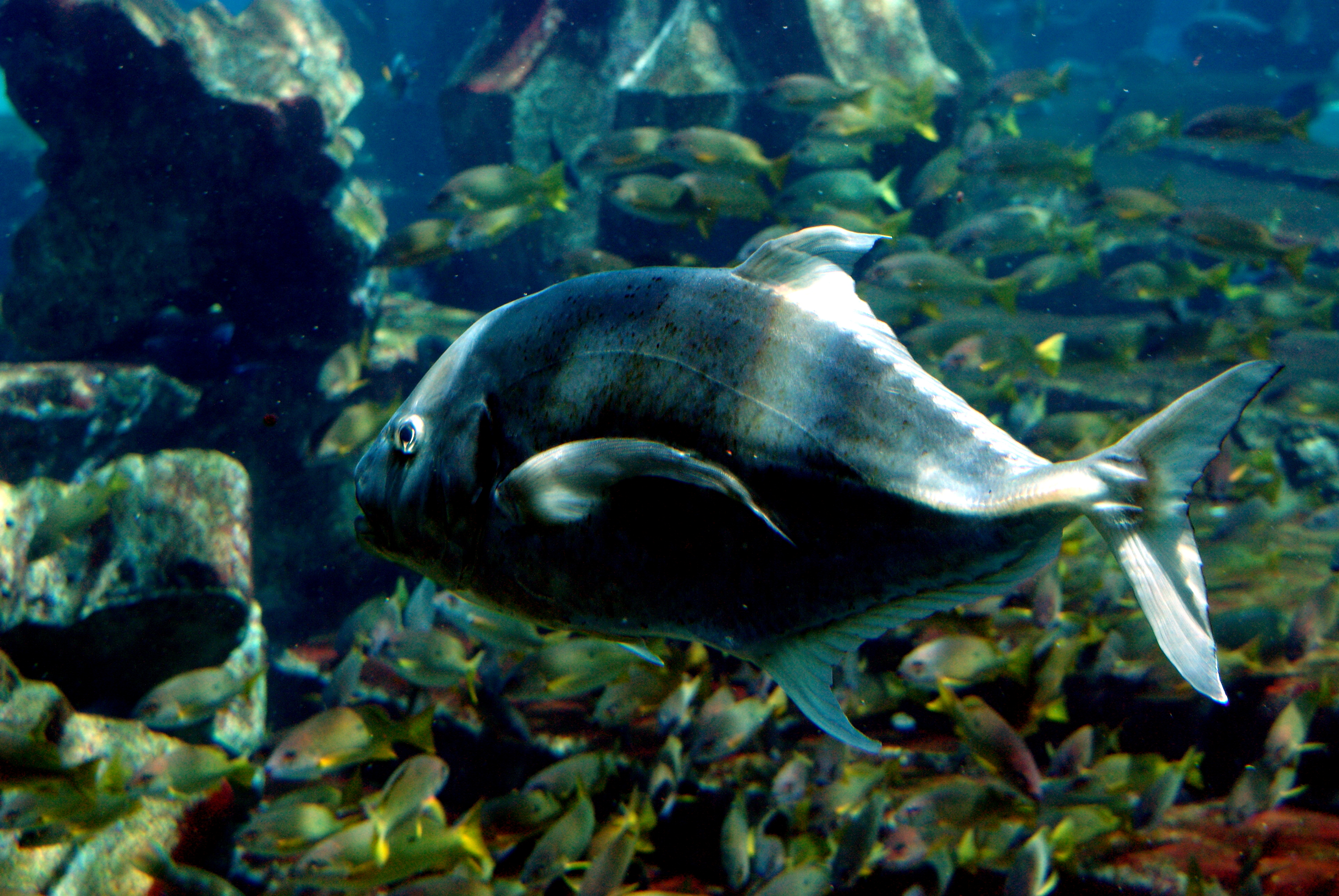

The longnose trevally is similar to other jacks in its overall body profile, having a strongly compressed, ovate shape as a juvenile, gradually becoming more oblong with age. It is a moderately large fish, recorded up to 72 cm in length and 4.35 kg in weight. The dorsal profile is more convex than the ventral profile. One of the species major diagnostic characters is its snout shape, having a gently sloped dorsal profile from the nape to near the snout, but becoming abruptly vertical just before the mouth cleft. Both of the jaws contain anteriorly widening bands of small villiform teeth, with larger individuals also having a number of conical outer teeth. There are two separate dorsal fins, the first consisting of 8 spines and the second of 1 spine and 18 to 20 soft rays. The anal fin comprises two detached anterior spines, followed by 1 spine and 14 to 17 soft rays. The lobes of both the soft anal and dorsal fin are falcate, with juveniles having the anteriormost rays extended into filaments. These are lost in adults, with the lobes becoming shorter than the head. The pectoral fins are long and falcate, not quite reaching the intersection of the arched and straight sections of the lateral line. The lateral line is moderately curved anteriorly, with this section up to twice as long as the straight section, which has between 20 and 37 weak scutes present. The breast of the longnose trevally is scaleless, extending up to behind the pelvic fin origin and laterally to the pectoral fin base. Five to 9 gill rakers occur on the first arch and 15 to 18 on the second arch, and the species has 24 vertebrae.

The longnose trevally is generally silver in colour, with the body and head greenish-blue above, becoming silvery with yellow-green reflections below. The operculum has a small black blotch on the upper margin. The dorsal and anal fins range in colour from whitish to pale yellow to dusky, with the membranes of soft anal fin rays often having a white spot at the base. The caudal and pectoral fins are pale to dusky yellow. Large adults often exhibit very dark head and fin colouration, nearing black. These fish are perhaps exhibiting mating or spawning colouration.

== Distribution and habitat ==
The longnose trevally inhabits tropical to subtropical waters in the Indian and west Pacific Oceans, ranging from South Africa and Madagascar, north to the Red Sea and Persian Gulf, east to India, South East Asia, Indonesia, Japan and to Fiji. The longnose trevally has been reported from many west Pacific islands, indicating that it is widespread in this region. The species ranges as far north as the Okinawa, Japan and as far south as northern Australia and New Zealand.

The longnose trevally is an inshore fish, normally found on coastal reefs and occasionally in large protected bays. It appears to be more tolerant of dirty, turbid waters than most of it relatives, but is not seen in estuaries. Juveniles reportedly inhabit shallow bays close to the coast, and are occasionally seen near beaches. Adults live in much deeper water, normally between 30 and 60 m, although have been recorded at depths of around 90 m.

== Biology and fishery ==
The longnose trevally is an epibenthic predator, taking prey from the seafloor or just above it, with only one study ever to thoroughly record its diet, which was carried out in the Gulf of Carpentaria of Australia. Here it was found its main prey were small fish, with considerable quantities of molluscs, brachyurans, and other crustaceans also taken. In South Africa, the species is thought to prefer prawns as its major dietary component, with crabs and small fish also taken. The longnose trevally has a fairly soft mouth, which may partly determine its diet. Very little is known of reproduction in the species, although juveniles have been recorded from shallow coastal bays.

The longnose trevally is of minor importance to fisheries throughout its range, taken by hook and line, bottom trawls, gill nets and various types of trap. It is usually sold fresh, and is often not distinguished from other species of carangid. The species is occasionally caught by boat anglers, as well as beach fishermen on the South African coast. They take small baits and are considered good for eating.
