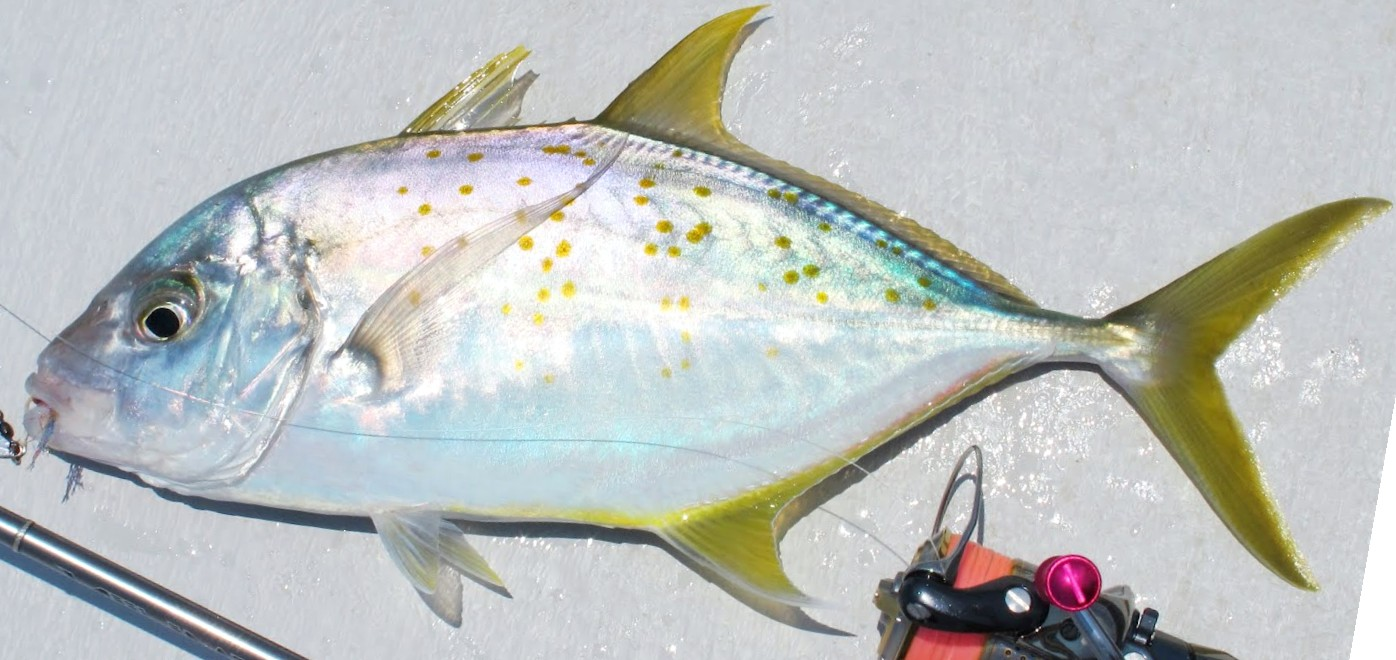

Conservation status
- Least Concern (IUCN 3.1)

Scientific classification
- Kingdom: Animalia
- Phylum: Chordata
- Class: Actinopterygii
- Order: Carangiformes
- Suborder: Carangoidei
- Family: Carangidae
- Genus: Carangoides
- Species: C. fulvoguttatus

Binomial name
- Carangoides fulvoguttatus (Forsskål, 1775)
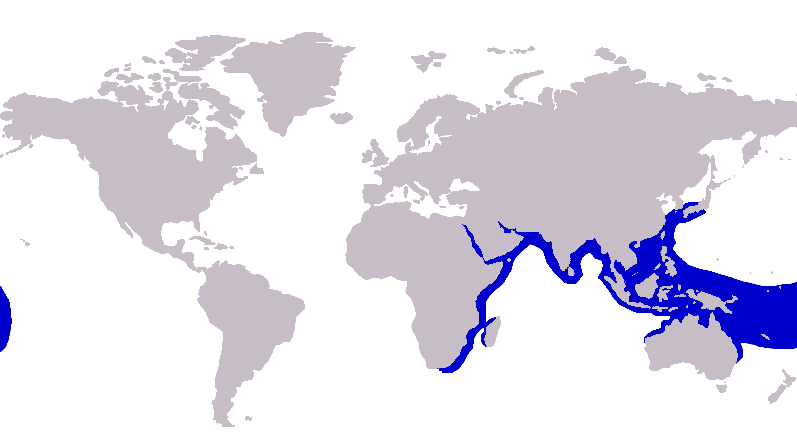
- Approximate range of the yellowspotted trevally

Synonyms
- Scomber fulvoguttatus Forsskål, 1775; Caranx fulvoguttatus (Forsskål, 1775); Turrum emburyi Whitley, 1932; Carangoides emburyi (Whitley, 1932); Caranx emburyi (Whitley, 1932); Ferdauia claeszooni Whitley, 1947

= Yellowspotted trevally =

Species of fish

The yellowspotted trevally (Carangoides fulvoguttatus), also known as the yellowspotted kingfish, goldspotted trevally, turrum, or yellowspot, is a widespread species of large inshore marine fish in the jack family Carangidae. The yellowspotted trevally inhabits the tropical and subtropical waters of the western Indo-Pacific region, from South Africa in the west to Japan and Australia in the east. The species is known to grow to a maximum length of at least 1.2 m, and is distinguished by gill raker and fin morphology, as well as the distinctive golden spots which give the fish its name. The yellowspotted trevally generally prefers inshore rocky and coral reefs, but is occasionally found over deep offshore sand banks to a depth of 100 m. It is a predatory fish, taking fish, cephalopods, and crustaceans, and shows diet partitioning with other trevallies in studies conducted in Australian waters. Reproduction is poorly studied, although observational evidence suggests spawning occurs in aggregations, probably during summer in South Africa. It is generally of minor importance to commercial fisheries throughout its range, but is considered an excellent sportfish by anglers and spearfishermen, and a good table fish.

== Taxonomy and naming ==
The yellowspotted trevally is classified within the genus Carangoides, a group of fish commonly known as jacks and trevallies. Carangoides falls into the jack and horse mackerel family Carangidae, the Carangidae are part of the order Carangiformes.

The species was first described by the naturalist Peter Forsskål in 1775 based on the holotype specimen taken from the waters of the Red Sea. He named the species Scomber fulvoguttatus relating the species to the true mackerels as during this period the family Carangidae had yet to be established. The species was later transferred to Caranx and then to Carangoides, where it has remained. The species was independently renamed a number of times, the first as Turrum emburyi by Gilbert Percy Whitley, a name which was commonly used and later transferred into Caranx and Carangoides. Some 15 years later, Whitley again assigned the fish to a new species and genus name, Ferdauia claeszooni, but this genus was soon synonymised with Carangoides, and this name, as well as Turrum emburyi, was shown to be a junior synonym of Carangoides fulvoguttatus. The common name 'turrum' is still used in Australia for the fish, but is also widely misapplied to similar species.

== Description ==
The yellowspotted trevally is a large fish, growing to at least 1.2 m in length and reaching a recorded maximum weight of 18 kg. Its body shape is like the jacks of the genus Caranx, being more elongated and subcylindrical than most of the other species of Carangoides. As a juvenile, the fish is more subovate, becoming more elongated with age, with the dorsal profile of the head and nape becoming steeper with age also. The dorsal fin is in two distinct parts, the first consisting of eight spines, while the second is composed of one spine and 25 to 30 soft rays, with the anterior lobe of this fin being shorter than the head length. The anal fin has two anteriorly detached spines followed by one spine attached to 21 to 26 soft rays and the pelvic fin has one spine and 18 to 19 soft rays. The lateral line has a gentle anterior arch, which is slightly longer than the straight section of the lateral line, with the intersection below the 13th to 16th soft ray of the dorsal fin. The curved section contains 80 to 88 scales, while the straight section consists of 12 to 17 scales and 26 to 31 scutes. The breast is scaleless until the origin of the pelvic fins and up to the origin of the pectoral fins, although some individuals have a narrow band of scales separating the pectoral fins. In adults, the mouth cleft is directly beneath the eye, with the both jaws containing bands of villiform teeth. It has 22 to 27 gill rakers in total and 24 vertebrae.

The juveniles of the yellowspotted trevally are uniformly silver with a few golden spots above the lateral line, with the upper body becoming a more iridescent blue green with increasing age. At adulthood, many small golden to brassy spots occur above the midline with large individuals also having three irregular, indistinct dark blotches on the flank. An inconspicuous dusky spot is usually seen on the operculum. The dorsal and anal fins are dusky yellow, with the anal fin having a whitish-blue leading edge and distal margin. The pectoral and caudal fins are olive-yellow, becoming dusky at the edges, while the pelvic fin is whitish-blue.

== Distribution and habitat ==
The yellowspotted trevally is broadly distributed in tropical and subtropical waters of the Indo-Pacific region. The species ranges from South Africa in the west, north to the Red Sea and India, and is distributed throughout Southeast Asia and the Indonesian island chain. Its range extends south to northern Australia, north to Taiwan and Japan, and as far east as Palau, Tonga, and New Caledonia in the Pacific.

The yellowspotted trevally predominantly inhabits inshore lagoons and rocky or coral reef systems, although is occasionally found in seagrass meadows, around offshore islands and on deep sand banks to depths around 100 m. It is intolerant of low salinities, so does not enter estuaries.

== Biology and fishery ==
The yellowspotted trevally lives either alone or in large schools, with smaller groups often patrolling the edges of reefs in search of food and large solitary fish are known to patrol seagrass beds in search of prey. The species' diet consists of small fish such as anchovies, a wide range of crustaceans, including swimming crabs, mantis shrimp, and prawns, and cephalopods such as squid. Preliminary dietary information collected from the North West Shelf of Australia shows C. fulvoguttatus and C. gymnostethus inhabit very similar habitats, and are able to do so by partitioning their diets, with C. fulvoguttatus taking more fish and cephalopods, while C. gymnostethus predominantly takes crustaceans. The only data on reproduction in the species come from Palau, where large spawning aggregations form in the third quarter of the lunar month. Spawning takes place in South Africa over the summer.

The yellowspotted trevally is of moderate importance to fisheries throughout its range, so catch statistics are rarely kept for this species specifically. One exception is Saudi Arabia, with the FAO reporting a yearly catch between 128 and 324 tonnes between 2000 and 2004, with no apparent trends in the catch data. The species is taken by hook and line, gill nets, and various traps. The yellowspotted trevally is of major importance to anglers and spearfishermen in some countries, with the species highly valued in Australia and South Africa. Surveys of recreational catches in the Pilbara region of Western Australia indicate around 5 tonnes of fish are taken every year, with around 3 tonnes kept for consumption or use as bait. Fish are mostly caught from boats using small baits including fish and crab, as well as lures, minnows, metal slugs, soft plastic lures, and even saltwater flies. It is an excellent gamefish, with young fish also considered good table fish, becoming somewhat dry with age. The yellowspotted trevally is also considered a good candidate for aquaculture in the future.
