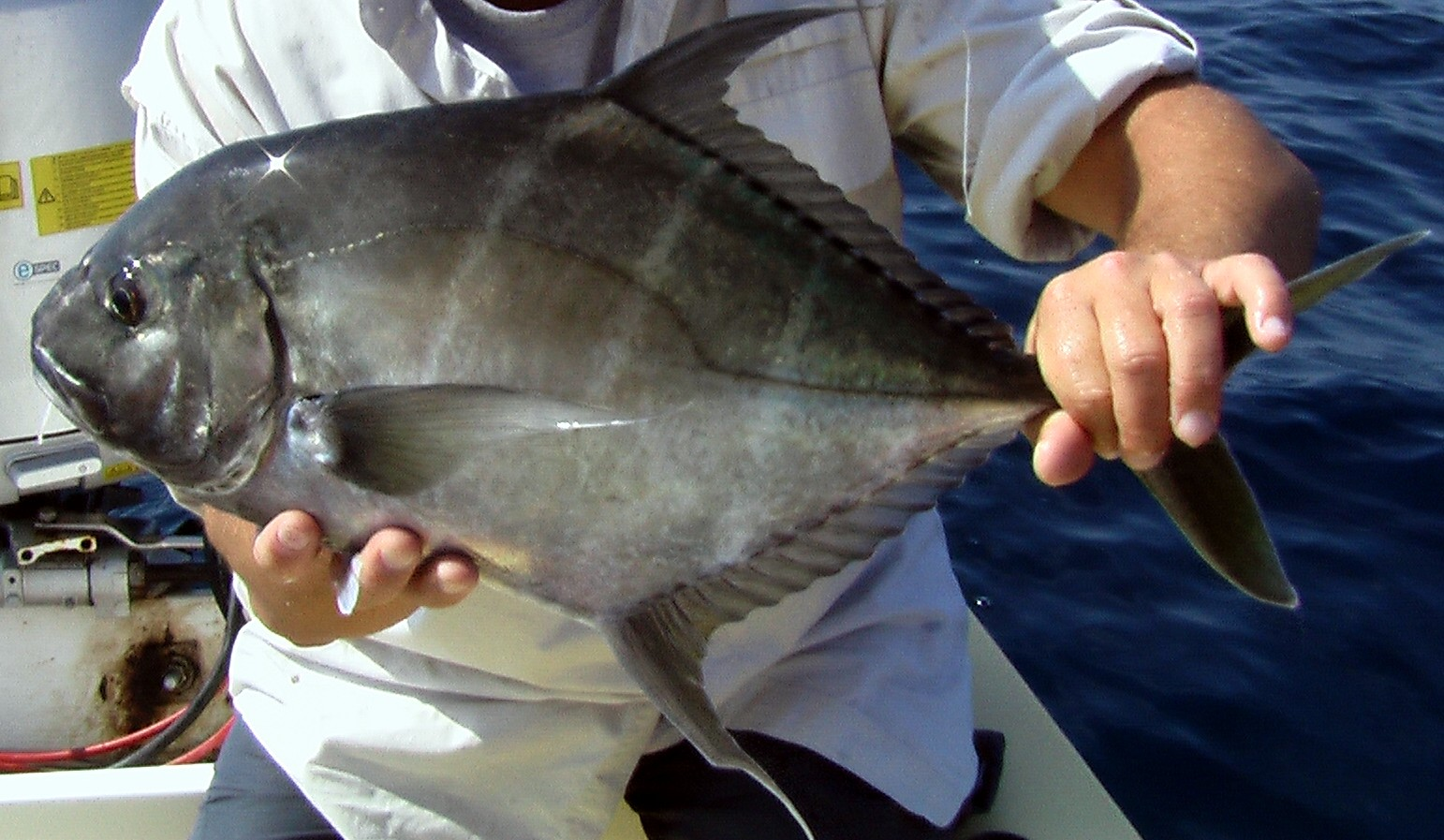

Conservation status
- Least Concern (IUCN 3.1)

Scientific classification
- Kingdom: Animalia
- Phylum: Chordata
- Class: Actinopterygii
- Order: Carangiformes
- Suborder: Carangoidei
- Family: Carangidae
- Genus: Euprepocaranx; Kimura, Takeuchi & Yadome, 2022
- Species: E. dorsalis

Binomial name
- Euprepocaranx dorsalis (Gill, 1863)
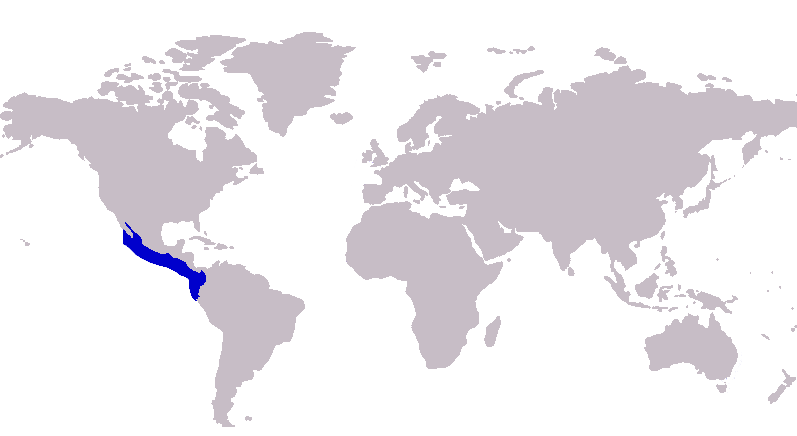
- Approximate range of the threadfin jack

Synonyms
- Caranx otrynter Jordan & Gilbert, 1883; Carangoides dorsalis Gill, 1863; Carangoides otrynter (Jordan & Gilbert, 1883); Caranx dorsalis (Gill, 1863); Citula dorsalis (Gill, 1863); Paraselene otrynter (Jordan & Gilbert, 1883)

= Threadfin jack =

Species of fish

The threadfin jack or thread pompano, Euprepocaranx dorsalis, is a species of coastal marine fish in the jack family Carangidae. The species inhabits the tropical waters of the eastern Pacific Ocean from Baja California in the north to Ecuador and the Galapagos Islands in the south. It is a moderately large fish, growing to 60 cm (24 in) and may be recognized by its filamentous dorsal and anal fin lobes. The threadfin jack inhabits both deeper coastal waters and inshore environments, including reefs and estuaries, where it preys on minute benthic and pelagic organisms, including small fishes and crustaceans. Very little is known about the ecology and reproductive cycle in the species. The threadfin jack is of importance to fisheries throughout its distribution, caught by hook-and-line and net methods and marketed fresh and salted, and is considered a very good table fish. The species was named Carangoides dorsalis by Theodore Gill 20 years before the name Caranx otrynter was introduced, but confusion with Vomer dorsalis led to the proposal of the new name to separate the two species.

== Taxonomy and naming ==
The threadfin jack is currently placed within the monotypic genus Euprepocaranx. The threadfin jack is a member of the jack and horse mackerel family Carangidae, which are, in turn, within the order Carangiformes.

The species was first scientifically described by the American ichthyologist Theodore Gill, who named the species Carangoides dorsalis based on the holotype taken from the west coast of Central America. This name and description was published in the Proceedings of the Academy of Natural Sciences of Philadelphia, in which Gill one year previously described another carangid, Vomer dorsalis. The state of carangid taxonomy at the time was rather confusing, with many synonymous genera and species present in the literature, and Vomer dorsalis was soon moved to Caranx, as was Carangoides dorsalis, creating a taxonomic homonym. To address this problem, the American ichthyologists David Starr Jordan and Charles Henry Gilbert in 1883 created the name Caranx otrynter as a replacement for the species originally named Carangoides dorsalis, basing their description on a new holotype specimen taken from Mazatlán, Mexico. The authors indicated that if Vomer was found to be a valid genus or subgenus, Vomer dorsalis could be reinstated and the original combination of Caranx dorsalis be restored. Despite V. dorsalis being transferred to Selene dorsalis, this never occurred and in a 1994 publication, Gerald Allen and D. Ross Robertson placed Caranx otrynter into the genus Carangoides, where it has remained until 2022. The specific name otrynter is derived from Latin, and means a driver, in allusion to the whip-like ray of the second dorsal fin. The common names of the species, threadfin jack and thread pompano, also refer to the filamentous, threadlike dorsal fin.

== Description ==
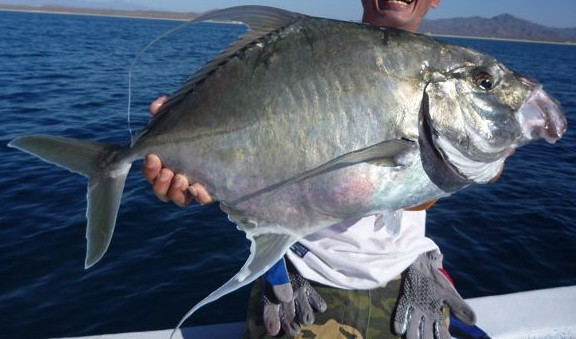
The threadlike dorsal and anal fin tips are characteristic.

The threadfin jack is a moderately large species, growing to a known maximum length of 60 cm. The species is similar in appearance to a number of jacks in the genera Carangoides and Alectis in its adult form, having a compressed, oblong body, with the dorsal and ventral profiles approximately equal in concavity. The head profile is quite angular, being most steep immediately above the mouth, and being moderately steep to the nape, becoming more horizontal posteriorly. The juveniles have a more oval to diamond shape, looking much like juveniles of the genus Alectis. The dorsal fin is in two parts, the first being greatly diminished and consisting of eight spines entirely embedded in the skin, with the second dorsal fin composed of one spine and 18 or 19 soft rays. The anal fin is composed of two anteriorly detached spines followed by one spine and 16 or 17 soft rays. Both juveniles and adults have highly elongated second dorsal and anal fin lobes, extended out into long filaments; they are most pronounced in juveniles. The lateral line has a moderate, regular arch anteriorly, which is roughly equal in length to the straight posterior section. The straight section has no to 15 scales followed by 40 to 52 small scutes. The breast is devoid of scales ventrally to behind the pelvic fin origin and diagonally up to the pectoral fin base. Both jaws contain uniform bands of small, weak teeth becoming wider posteriorly and irregular conical outer teeth in adults. It has 21 to 23 gill rakers and 24 vertebrae.

In life, the threadfin jack is a silvery-blue above, becoming silvery-white on the underside, with golden to yellow reflections. The first dorsal and pelvic fin is grey, while the second dorsal, anal, pectoral, and caudal fins are hyaline or grey with a yellow tinge. Juveniles have clear, dark, vertical bands, fading with age. Much like the shadow trevally, small black spots occur on the bases of soft dorsal rays and the body immediately below them that increase in size with age, with a small black blotch on the upper operculum.

== Distribution and habitat ==
The threadfin jack is distributed throughout the tropical regions of the eastern Pacific Ocean, inhabiting the western coast of the Americas. The northern limit to the species range is southern Baja California, with its range extending south to Mexico and Central America to a southern limit of Ecuador, with the species also recorded from the Galapagos Islands. It is one of only two species of the genus Carangoides found on the western coastline of the Americas, with the other species being the widely distributed island trevally, Carangoides orthogrammus.

The species appears to undergo a major transition in lifestyle after its juvenile phase, with young individuals leading a pelagic lifestyle, able to be transported to offshore islands such as the Galapagos by currents. Older individuals are more benthic in nature, inhabiting the bottom of the water column in mostly coastal waters on reefs. Smaller fish have been recorded from estuaries, mangrove-lined creeks, shallow bays, and lagoons, although larger fish live in much deeper waters up to 50 m (160 ft) in depth.

== Biology and fishery ==
Much of biology and ecology of the threadfin jack is unknown, with the species' diet the only studied aspect of its biology. A study in fishes of the continental shelf of Colombia found the species takes predominantly small, benthic fishes of the families Triglidae, Synodontidae, and Batrachoididae. Other common prey included benthic crustaceans, including various crabs and shrimp. Nothing is known of its reproductive cycle.

The threadfin jack is of some importance to fisheries throughout its range, although individual catch statistics for the species are not kept. It is often caught by hook-and-line methods or by gill nets and various artisanal traps. It is considered to be good to excellent table fare, and is marketed both fresh and salted. The species has also been found at a number of archaeological sites in both Panama and Ecuador, indicating it has been caught by humans for food for at least 3450 years. The threadfin jack is also of interest to anglers who catch the species occasionally, and is considered a minor gamefish. Juveniles are occasionally caught from shore, such as piers and breakwaters, while larger individuals are caught over deeper reefs. The species takes a variety of bait, including fish and prawns, but they also take lures, including hard and small, fly-like Sabiki lures.
