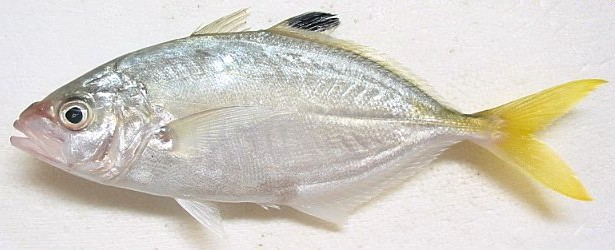

Conservation status
- Least Concern (IUCN 3.1)

Scientific classification
- Kingdom: Animalia
- Phylum: Chordata
- Class: Actinopterygii
- Order: Carangiformes
- Suborder: Carangoidei
- Family: Carangidae
- Genus: Carangoides
- Species: C. praeustus

Binomial name
- Carangoides praeustus (Anonymous [ E. T. Bennett ], 1830)
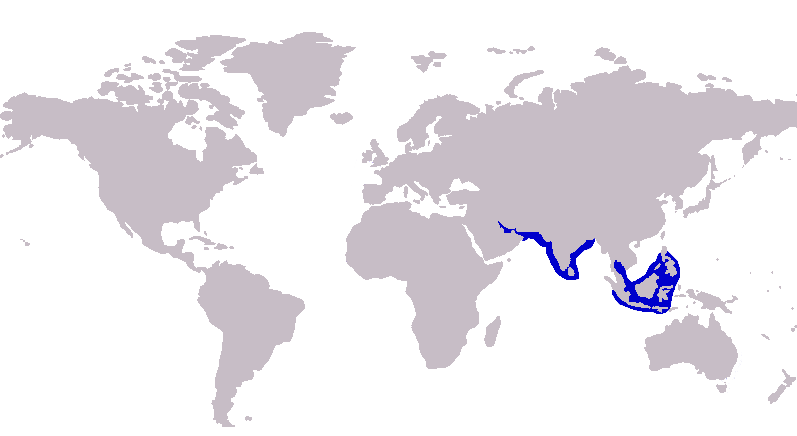
- Approximate range of the brownback trevally

Synonyms
- Caranx praeustus Anonymous [Bennett], 1830; Caranx ire Cuvier, 1833; Caranx melanostethos Day, 1865

= Brownback trevally =

Species of fish

The brownback trevally (Carangoides praeustus), also known as the brown-backed trevally, is a species of small inshore marine fish classified in the jack family, Carangidae. The brownback trevally is distributed in two populations through the tropical waters of the Indo-west Pacific region, ranging from the Persian Gulf east to India, South East Asia and the Indonesian islands. The species is distinguished from similar species by its completely scaled breast and black-tipped second dorsal fin, and is known to reach a maximum length of 25 cm. The brownback trevally inhabits inshore waters including bays and estuaries, where it preys on demersal crustaceans and small fish. Other aspects of its biology are poorly known, and it is of minor importance to fisheries, occasionally caught by hook and line or trawls. William Smith-Vaniz has recently suggested the two distinct populations may actually represent two distinct species.

== Taxonomy and naming ==
The brownback trevally is classified within the genus Carangoides, one of a number of groups of fish referred to as jacks and trevallies. Carangoides falls into the jack and horse mackerel family Carangidae, the Carangidae are part of the order Carangiformes.

The species was first scientifically described by an unknown author in a publication entitled 'Memoir of the Life and Public Services of Sir Thomas Stamford Raffles', in which a chapter was dedicated to fish specimens Raffles had collected. The author is usually presumed to be the English zoologist Edward Turner Bennett, but due to a lack of evidence to support this, his name is placed in parentheses as required by the ICZN code. The species was here published under the name of Caranx praeustus, with the holotype collected from Sumatra, Indonesia. This classification was later changed to the genus Carangoides by Pieter Bleeker, where it has remained. Two junior synonyms have been applied to the species, Caranx ire and Caranx melanostethos, which are invalid under ICZN rules. The species specific epithet praeustus is Latin; meaning "burnt at the tip", in reference to its black dorsal lobe.

In the last revision of the carangids of the Indo-Pacific, William Smith-Vaniz found that the two separate populations have differing gill raker counts and breast squamation, leading him to suggest the possibility of these being two separate species. If further study indicates these are two separate species, the name Carangoides ire should be reinstated, as Georges Cuvier described a fish from this second western Indian Ocean population as Caranx ire.

== Description ==
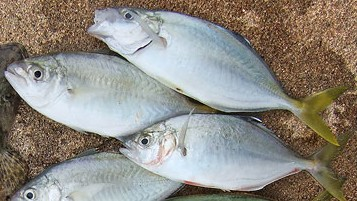
An anglers catch of brownback trevally

The brownback trevally is a relatively small species of carangid, growing to a maximum recorded length of 25 cm, but is much more common at lengths less than 16 cm. The species has a similar body profile to other trevallies in the same genus, having an elongate, compressed form with the dorsal and ventral profiles approximately equal in convexity. The dorsal fin is in two parts, the first consisting of 8 spines while the second has 1 spine and 21 to 24 soft rays, with both dorsal fins of approximately equal height. The anal fin has two anteriorly detached spines followed by 1 spine and 18 to 20 soft rays. The lateral line has a moderate anterior arch, with the straight and arched sections being nearly equal in length. The straight part of the lateral line has 4 to 12 scales followed by 23 to 34 scutes. The breast is nearly completely scaled, occasionally having a partially naked midventral area, which rarely extends the entire length of the breast. In the western population, all individuals have this narrow naked midventral area extending the entire length of the breast. Both jaws have an irregular row of small conical teeth, with the upper jaw also having a narrow band of teeth anteriorly. The gill raker count also varies between the two populations, with the eastern population having 32 to 37 in total, while the western population has 40 to 47. There are 24 vertebrae.

The brownback trevally is silvery blue-grey dorsally, shading to silvery underneath, sometimes with a broad brassy midlateral zone. There is no dark opercular spot. The distal area of the second dorsal fin lobe is strongly black, usually with a white tip while the remainder of the fin is dusky. The caudal fin is yellow and all other fins are whitish to hyaline.

== Distribution and habitat ==
The brownback trevally is distributed in two distinct populations in the tropical waters of the Indo-west pacific region. The western population extends from the waters of Iran in the Persian Gulf to the Bay of Bengal off Bangladesh, with records also from the Maldives and Sri Lanka. The eastern population inhabits a wide region in the South East Asian and Indonesian region, from the Gulf of Thailand to Borneo, Philippines and Indonesia.

The brownback trevally is a coastal species, inhabiting both rocky and coral reefs, as well as bay and estuary environments. The species prefers calm, sheltered waters.

== Biology and fishery ==
The biology of the brownback trevally is known only from a single research study on its diet, and observational evidence recorded by divers. The study was located in the South China Sea, and focused on the diets of two species of sillaginids, with investigations into the trophic relationships of fish in the region. It was found the brownback trevally primarily consumes shrimps, with lesser amounts of calanoid copepods and small fish also taken. Observations indicate the fish form schools of up to 13 fish, which patrol reefs, and are inquisitive of divers. In Hong Kong waters, the fish is present from April to October, with a darkening of the fishes colour appearing to indicate spawning occurs in September at this locality.

The brownback trevally is of minor importance to fisheries throughout its range, often taken as bycatch in various trawling and hook and line operations. It is generally not distinguished from other trevally species, and no catch statistics are reported. It is also often taken by small artisanal fisheries by various inshore fish traps.
