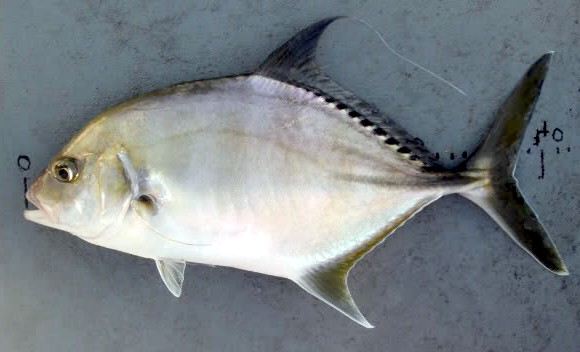

Conservation status
- Least Concern (IUCN 3.1)

Scientific classification
- Kingdom: Animalia
- Phylum: Chordata
- Class: Actinopterygii
- Order: Carangiformes
- Suborder: Carangoidei
- Family: Carangidae
- Genus: Carangichthys
- Species: C. oblongus

Binomial name
- Carangichthys oblongus (Cuvier, 1833)
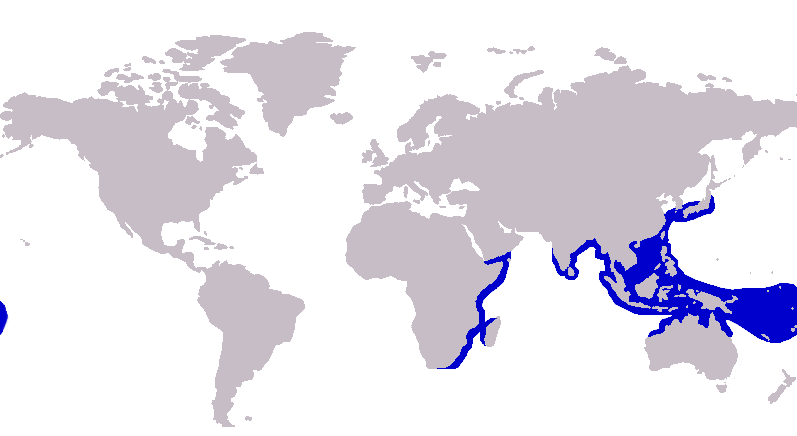
- Approximate range of the coachwhip trevally

Synonyms
- Caranx oblongus Cuvier, 1833; Carangoides oblongus (Cuvier, 1833); Caranx auriga De Vis, 1884; Caranx deani Jordan & Seale, 1905; Citula gracilis Ogilby, 1915; Caranx gracilis (Ogilby, 1915); Caranx tanakai Wakiya, 1924

= Coachwhip trevally =

Species of ray-finned fish

The coachwhip trevally (Carangichthys oblongus), also known as the oblong trevally or oblique-banded trevally, is a species of inshore marine fish classified in the jack family Carangidae. The coachwhip trevally is distributed through the Indo-west Pacific region, ranging from South Africa in the west to Fiji and Japan in the east. It is a moderately large fish, growing to a known maximum length of 46 cm and can be distinguished from similar species by an array of detailed morphological features including dentition, fin ray counts and scale patterns. The coachwhip trevally inhabits coastal waters throughout its range, known to prefer estuarine waters in a number of localities. Nothing is known of its diet or reproductive biology, and is of little importance to fisheries, occasionally taken as bycatch in trawl and hook and line fisheries.

== Taxonomy and naming ==
The coachwhip trevally is classified within the genus Carangichthys. Carangichthys falls into the jack and horse mackerel family Carangidae, and Carangidae is part of the order Carangiformes.

The species was first scientifically described by the French naturalist Georges Cuvier in 1833 based on a specimen taken from the waters of New Guinea which was designated to be the holotype. Cuvier named this new species Caranx oblongus, with the specific epithet meaning 'oblong' in reference to the species shape. Over time, it was reclassified first into the genus Carangichthys and later into Carangoides, but it is now once again placed in Carangichthys. The species was also independently redescribed and classified several times, first as Caranx auriga by Charles De Vis, Citula gracilis by William Ogilby and as Caranx tanakai by Yojiro Wakiya. These names all were applied after Cuvier's initial, correct naming making them junior synonyms under ICZN rules, rendering them invalid. The common names applied to the species are descriptive, with the name 'coachwhip trevally' in allusion to the elongated, whip-like dorsal fin lobe.

== Description ==
The coachwhip trevally is a moderately large fish, known to grow to a known maximum length of 46 cm. It is similar in shape to most other carangids, especially the shadow trevally, Carangichthys dinema, which it also resembles in having a 'shadowed' appearance under its second dorsal fin. It can be distinguished from C. dinema by fin ray and lateral line scale and scute counts. It has a compressed, oblong body with the dorsal profile more convex than the ventral profile, with the head profile also slightly convex. The dorsal fin is divided into two distinct sections, the first containing 8 spines, while the second consists of 1 spine and 20 to 22 soft rays, with the lobe of this second fin being elongate and longer than the head length. The anal fin consists of 2 anteriorly detached spines followed by 1 spine attached to 18 or 19 soft rays, while the pelvic fin has 1 spine followed by 18 or 19 soft rays. The lateral line has a moderate anterior arch, with the chord of this arch slightly shorter than the straight section, another feature which separates C. oblongus from C. dinema. The curved section of the lateral line has 60 to 69 scales while the straight section has 0 to 2 scales and 37 to 42 scutes. The breast is scaleless, reaching ventrally to the pelvic fin origin, while laterally the naked breast is separated from the naked base of the pectoral fins by a band of scales. Both jaws contain bands of small teeth, with the bands becoming wider anteriorly. The upper jaw also hosts an irregular series of moderately large outer teeth, with the largest specimens showing this in the lower jaw as well. There are 26 to 30 gill rakers and 24 vertebrae.

The coachwhip trevally is a dusky olive green colour above, fading to a silvery white or yellow below with small blue to black blotches present on the dorsal line between the bases of the second dorsal fin rays. The upper caudal and soft dorsal fins are dusky blue, while the anal fin is yellow having white lobe tips. The pelvic and pectoral fins are yellow. There is a diffuse dark opercular blotch, which may be absent altogether.

== Distribution and habitat ==
The coachwhip trevally is distributed throughout the tropical and subtropical regions of the Indian and west Pacific Oceans. In the Indian Ocean, the species ranges from South Africa and Madagascar in the west, northward to the Gulf of Aden, but no records exist of captures in the Red Sea or further north until India and Sri Lanka. In the eastern Indian Ocean, it is known from China, South East Asia, Indonesia and northern Australia. In the Pacific its range extends from Papua New Guinea north to Taiwan and Japan and east to New Caledonia and Fiji.

The coachwhip trevally is known to inhabit coastal waters throughout its range. The few times it has been recorded in thorough species surveys it generally appears as juveniles in estuaries, with this found in surveys around Australia, Fiji and the Solomon Islands. Adults also inhabit estuaries, but adults possibly move into bays and over shallow reefs.

== Biology and fishery ==
The coachwhip trevally has had extremely little information collected regarding its diet, ecological interactions, reproduction and growth. Based on other fish in the same genus, it is certainly a predatory fish, although its diet is wholly unknown. The species is of very little importance to fisheries, and certainly does not have catch statistics kept for it, usually counted among other species of trevally. It is usually taken as bycatch in trawling and hook and line fisheries.
