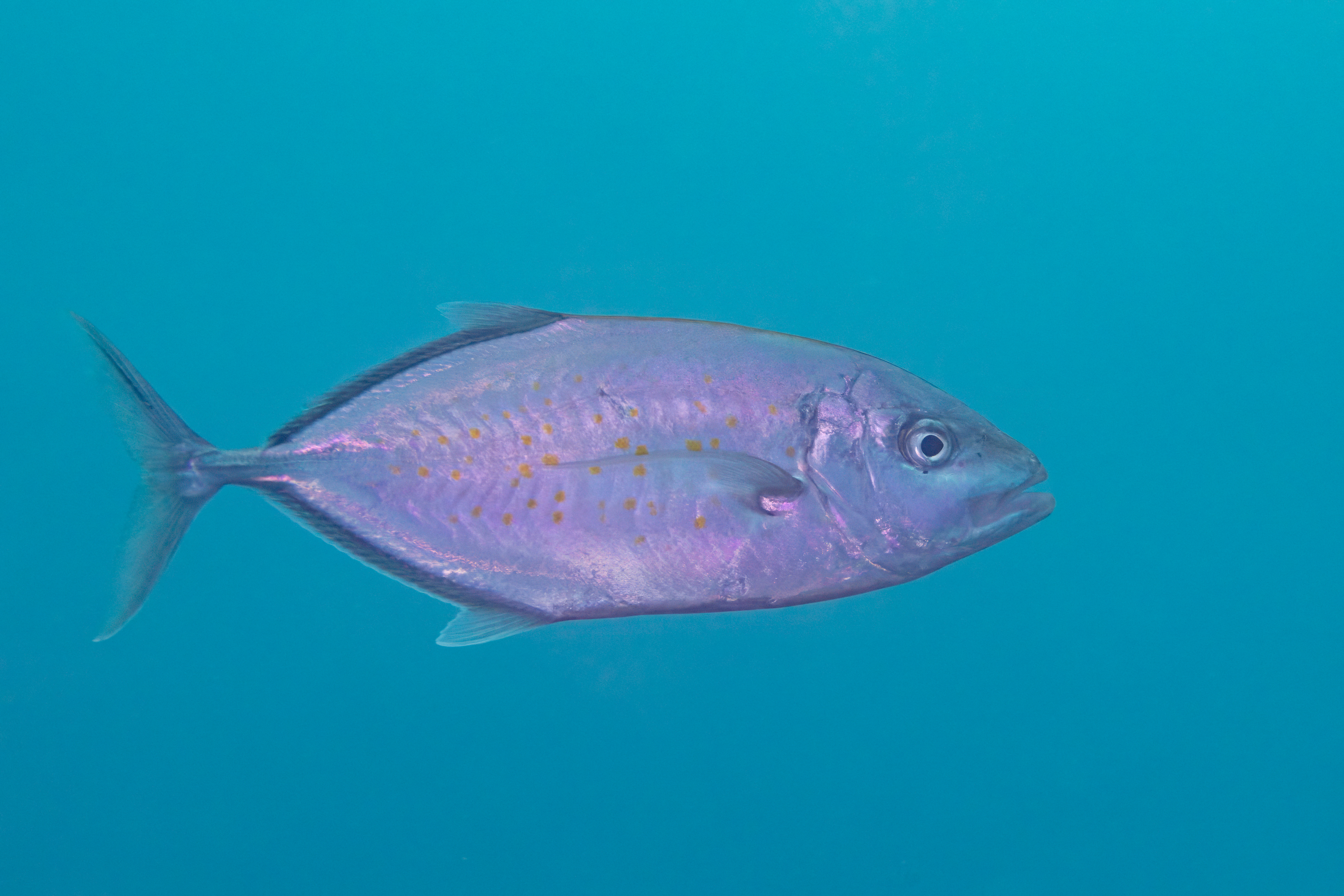

Conservation status
- Least Concern (IUCN 3.1)

Scientific classification
- Kingdom: Animalia
- Phylum: Chordata
- Class: Actinopterygii
- Order: Carangiformes
- Suborder: Carangoidei
- Family: Carangidae
- Genus: Carangoides
- Species: C. bajad

Binomial name
- Carangoides bajad (Forsskål, 1775)
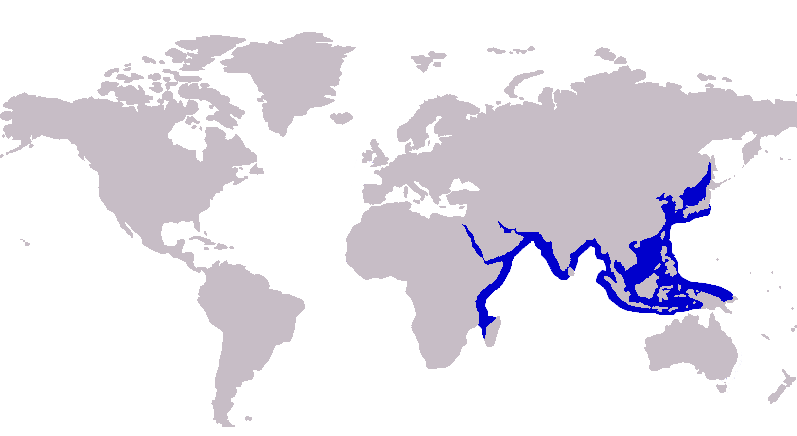
- Approximate range of the orangespotted trevally

Synonyms
- Scomber ferdau bajad Forsskål, 1775; Caranx bajad (Forsskål, 1775); Caranx immaculatus Ehrenberg, 1833; Caranx auroguttatus Cuvier, 1833; Carangoides auroguttatus (Cuvier, 1833); Caranx fulvoguttatus var. flava Klunzinger, 1871

= Orange-spotted trevally =

Species of fish

The orange-spotted trevally, Carangoides bajad (also known as the gold-spotted trevally) is a species of inshore marine fish in the jack family, Carangidae. The species is fairly common in tropical to subtropical waters of the Indo-Pacific, ranging from Madagascar in the west to Japan in the east, typically inhabiting inshore reefs. The species has characteristic orange-yellow spots on its sides, although counts of fin rays and scutes are needed to distinguish it from related species with similar colouring. Orange-spotted trevallies are powerful predators, taking a variety of small fish, nekton, and crustaceans, and reach sexual maturity around 25 cm long. It is a moderately large fish, reaching a maximum known length of 55 cm. The species is occasionally taken by fishermen throughout its range, and is generally considered to be bycatch. The exception to this is in the southern Persian Gulf, where it makes up a large proportion of the fishery.

== Taxonomy and naming ==
The orange-spotted trevally is classified within the genus Carangoides, a group of fish commonly called jacks and trevallies. Carangoides falls into the jack and horse mackerel family Carangidae, the Carangidae are part of the order Carangiformes.

The species was first scientifically described by the Swedish naturalist Peter Forsskål in 1775 based on a specimen taken from the Red Sea which he designated to be the holotype. The specific epithet is an Arabic name of the fish (although it is now usually applied to a catfish, Bagrus bajad, which Forsskål also named), with the letter "j" transcribing a /j/ sound; Forsskål used this technique to name a number of Red Sea fish species. Forsskål at first gave the new taxon subspecies status as Scomber ferdau bajad, relating it to the mackerels, and especially Scomber ferdau, which would later also be transferred to Carangoides. The taxon was later given a species rank, becoming Scomber bajad, then Caranx bajad, before being transferred to its current position as Carangoides bajad.

The species was also independently renamed three times after Forsskål's description, the first coming from Christian Gottfried Ehrenberg, who named the species Caranx immaculatus, although he did not accurately publish the name, leading Georges Cuvier to rename the fish as Caranx auroguttatus in 1833, which was later transferred to Carangoides. In 1871, Carl Benjamin Klunzinger once again proposed a new subspecies (or variety) name for the fish, Caranx fulvoguttatus var. flava. All names except Carangoides bajad are considered to be junior synonyms under the ICZN rules, and are rendered invalid and not used.

== Description ==
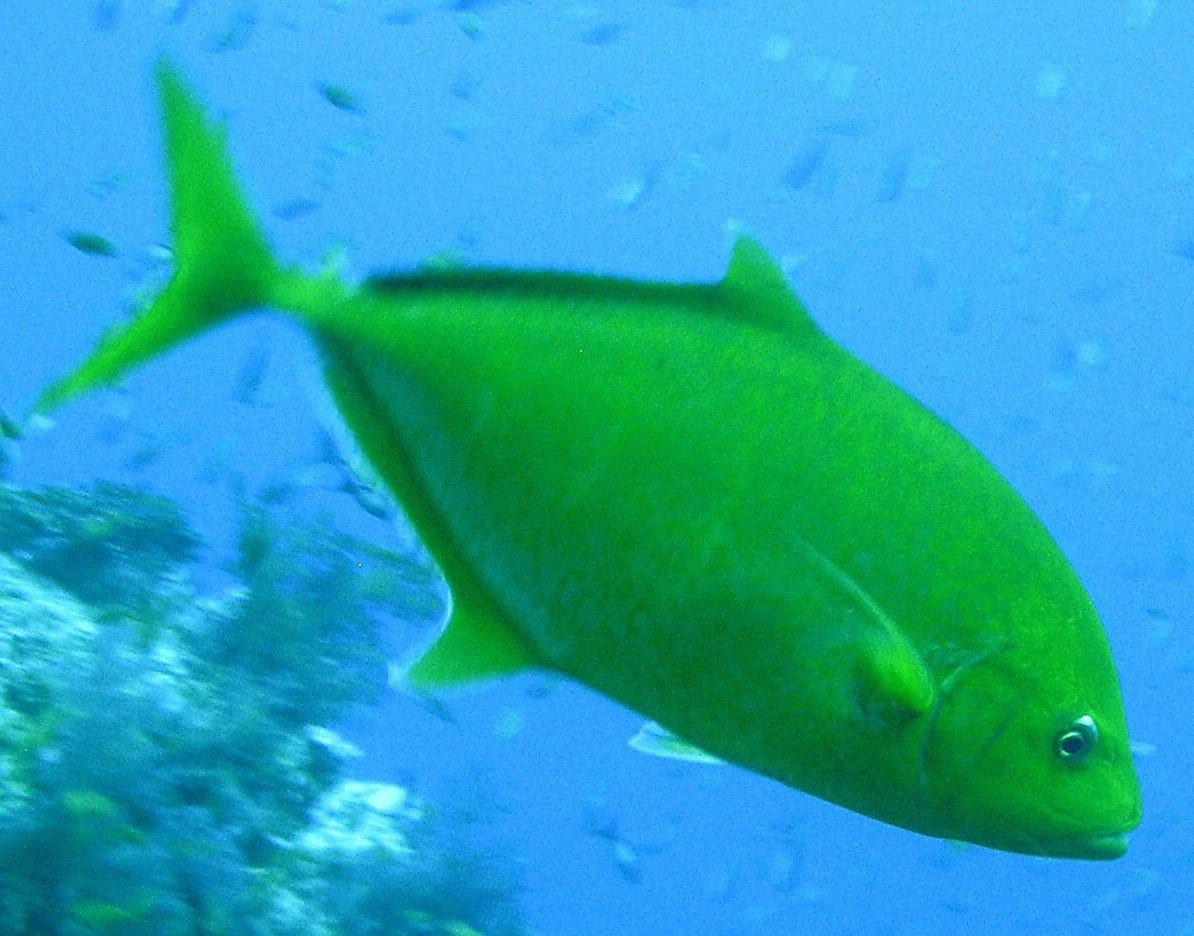
An orange-yellow orange-spotted trevally in Egypt

The orange-spotted trevally has the typical body profile of its genus, having a moderately deep, compressed oblong shape, with the dorsal profile more convex than the ventral profile. It is a moderately large fish, with adults typically reaching a size of 45–60 cm. The largest fish recorded was 72 cm, but are most common at sizes below 40 cm. The dorsal profile of the head is quite straight from the snout to the nape, with an eye diameter smaller than the snout length. Both jaws contain narrow bands of villiform teeth, with these bands becoming wider anteriorly. The dorsal fin is in two parts, the first containing eight spines and the second of one spine followed by 24 to 26 soft rays. The anal fin is similar to the second dorsal fin, although slightly shorter, and consists of two anteriorly detached spines followed by one spine and 21 to 24 soft rays. Another of the major diagnostic features for the species is the length of the anal fin lobe in comparison to the head length, with C. bajad having a head length longer than the anal fin lobe. The lateral line has a slight, broad anterior curve, with this curved section being longer than the posterior straight section. The straight section of the lateral line has 14 to 26 scales followed by 20 to 30 scutes. The chest of the orange-spotted trevally is completely scaled, occasionally having a narrow naked region on the underside near the ventral fins. It has 24 vertebrae and 25 to 43 gill rakers.

The orange-spotted trevally has a silvery grey- to brassy-coloured body, becoming paler to a silvery white ventrally. Many conspicuous orange to yellow spots occur on the sides of the fish, giving the species its name, and make for an easy way to identify the fish in the field. An entirely yellow variant has been reported, although the fish is thought to be able to rapidly change between its normal colour configuration and this colour. The colour of the fins ranges from hyaline to lemon yellow, and no dark opercular spot is present.

== Distribution and habitat ==
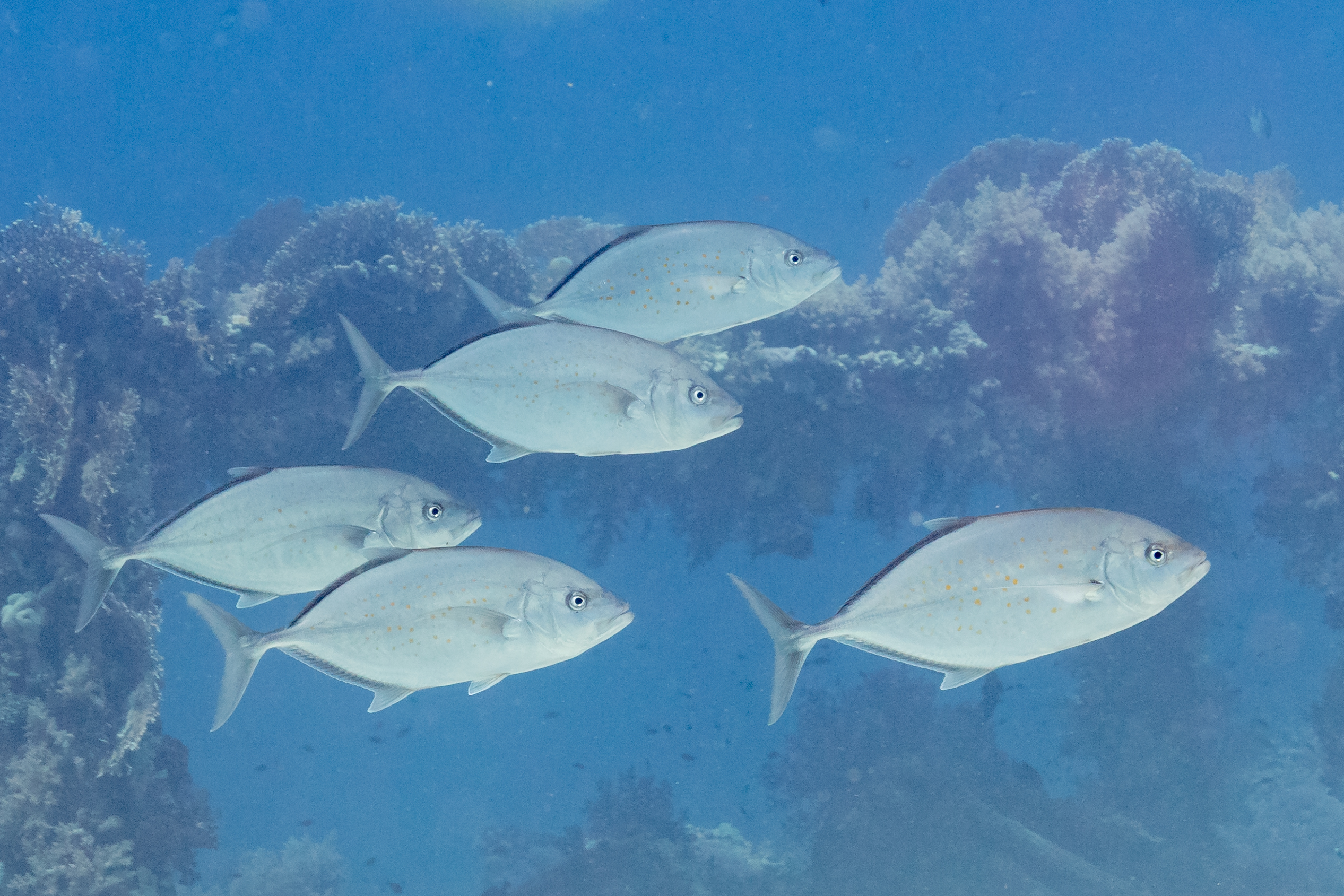
Group of orange-spotted trevallies in the red Sea, Egypt

The orange-spotted trevally inhabits the tropical to subtropical waters of the Indian and western Pacific Oceans. It is distributed from Madagascar and the Comoros Islands in the west, northwards to the Red Sea, the Gulf of Aden, and the Persian Gulf, and probably east toward India, although few fish have been recorded in this region. It is commonly found from the Gulf of Thailand to Okinawa, Japan in the east, and southward to Indonesia, the Philippines, and New Britain. In 2005, orange-spotted trevally reportedly had been caught in the Mediterranean Sea, indicating they had become Lessepsian migrants, passing through the Suez Canal to extend their range. This claim has been disputed, though, with the source of the report coming under question due to the presence of other species unknown to the Mediterranean shown in the purported photograph.

The orange-spotted trevally is a coastal species, most common in inshore waters over rocky and coral reefs, where it is found both solitary and in schools at depths of 2 to 50 m. They are often observed patrolling the edges of seaward reefs, and have been known to mingle with Parupeneus cyclostomus.

== Biology and fisheries ==
The orange-spotted trevally is a strong-swimming predator that takes a variety of prey, including fish, crustaceans, and nekton. They reach sexual maturity around 1–3 years of age when they are about 15–30 cm in length. The main spawning period in the Persian Gulf is between June and September. Whether further differences in the spawning period occurs throughout its range is currently unknown. This species also exhibits seasonal oscillation in growth rate, which was fastest during November–April and slowest during May–September.

The orange-spotted trevally is occasionally taken throughout its range by hook and line, gill nets, and other artisanal gear, although in most areas it is bycatch and does not form a large part of these fisheries. One fishery is highly dependent on the species in the southern Persian Gulf. There, the orange-spotted trevally is one of the most common fish found just above the sea floor, and is taken by wire traps and sold fresh at local markets. The combined catch of C. bajad and Gnathanodon speciosus totals around 1100 tonnes per year. The development of the fishing fleet of the United Arab Emirates has caused a number of species to be overexploited, but the orange-spotted trevally is still being taken at sustainable levels.
