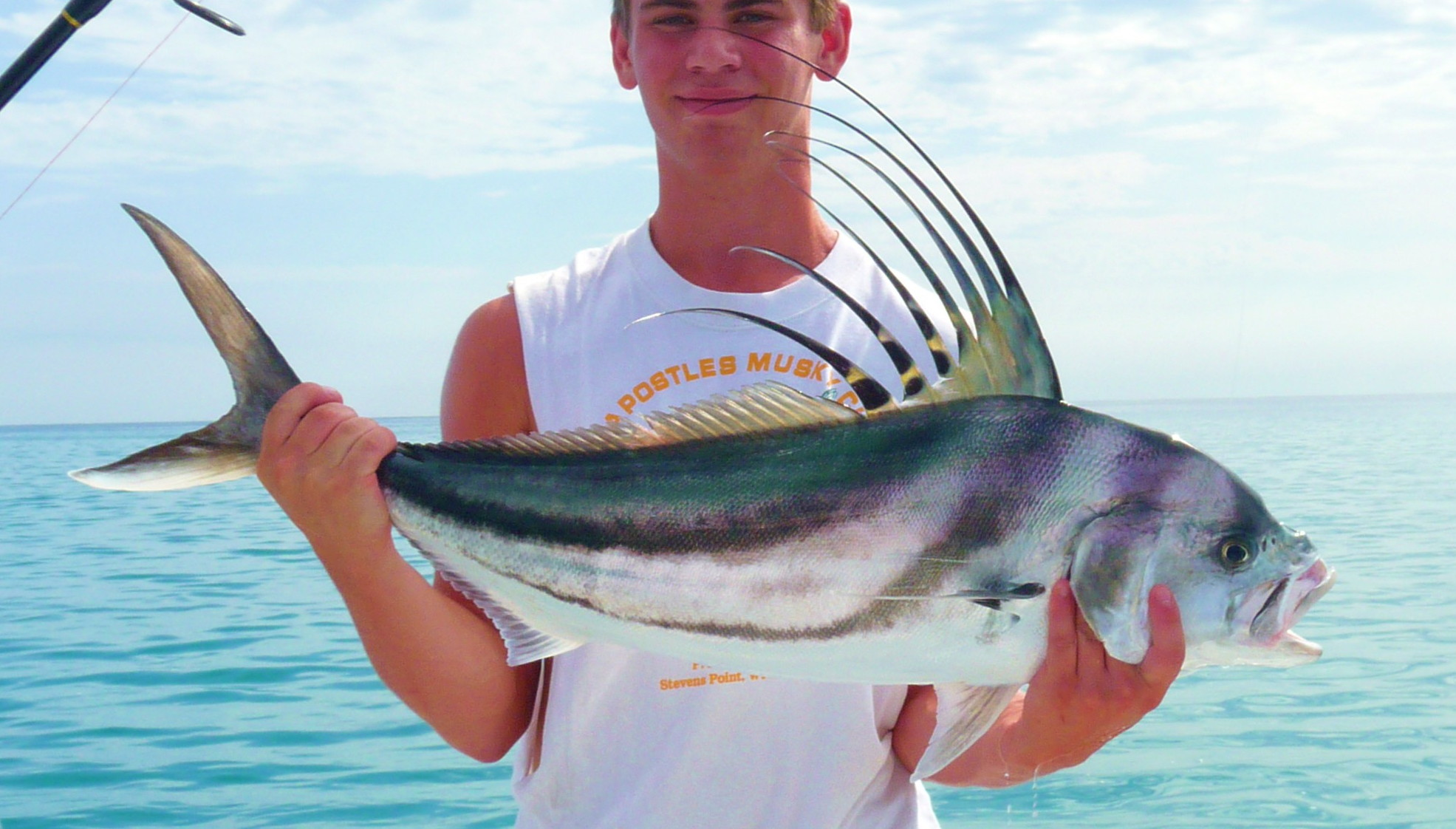

Conservation status
- Least Concern (IUCN 3.1)

Scientific classification
- Kingdom: Animalia
- Phylum: Chordata
- Class: Actinopterygii
- Order: Carangiformes
- Suborder: Nematistioidei; Girard et al., 2020
- Family: Nematistiidae; T. N. Gill, 1862
- Genus: Nematistius; T. N. Gill, 1862
- Species: N. pectoralis

Binomial name
- Nematistius pectoralis T. N. Gill, 1862
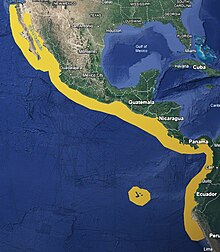
- Distribution of roosterfish

= Roosterfish =

Species of fish

The roosterfish (Nematistius pectoralis) is a unique species of marine carangiform fish found in the warmer shallow waters of the southeastern Pacific Ocean, from Baja California south to Peru. Roosterfish are a popular sport fish for being strong fighters. They are also important targets of local artisanal and subsistence fisheries. It is the only species in the genus Nematistius, the family Nematistiidae, and the suborder Nematistioidei. Their name comes from them having a "rooster comb" or seven long spines on the dorsal fin. Roosterfish can reach over 1.6 m (5 ft 3 in) in length and over 50 kg (110 lb) in weight.

== Taxonomy ==
The scientific name of the roosterfish is Nematistius pectoralis. It was first described by American ichthyologist, mammalogist, malacologist, and librarian Theodore Gill in 1862 based on specimens from the Smithsonian Institution collected by John Xantus. Roosterfish are ray-finned fishes and therefore reside in the class Actinopterygii. They are one of the largest fish in the order Carangiformes. Roosterfish are the sole member of the family Nematistiidae and the suborder Nematistioidei. They are a unique group with no close relatives, although they appear to be the sister group to the Menoidei (comprising the moonfish and billfishes).

== Morphological description ==
The body form of roosterfish is elongate and fusiform in shape. They have wide bands of simple teeth lining the inside of their pointed head. Their dorsal fin always has seven spines and a separate section of 25 soft rays, the anal fin has two spines and 15 soft rays, the pectoral fin has 16 soft rays that are very long and curved. The caudal fin is deeply forked. Silvery reflective and bluish to gray in color on head and body. They have four black bars, one runs between their eyes, another across the back part of the head, two begin at the dorsal fin and curve along the length of the body back towards the tail. The ridge of their spine also has some darker coloration. A large black patch is apparent on the lower base of the pectoral fins. The spines of their dorsal fin are yellowish gray and black towards the tip. The dorsal fin on juvenile roosterfish is black with a white bar in the center and white, yellow, and black striping towards the top.

== Life cycle ==
There are few studies on the spawning habits of roosterfish. They typically spawn during the warmer months, but this varies across their range. During the spawning season roosterfish gather in large groups called spawning congregations. While they migrate the perform courtship rituals. Roosterfish are ovuliparous meaning they exhibit external fertilization where the sperm and eggs are shed directly into the water. When the eggs hatch the fry are transparent. At this stage of their life they are very vulnerable to predation. The juvenile fish roosterfish are characterized by black bands that run vertically on their bodies and the majority of their body is silver. Juveniles tend to live in shallow waters close to the coast where there is a surplus of food and protection from predation. This behavior helps them to facilitate growth. Sexual maturity is reached at age 4+. When they reach this age, and their body size is adequate, they join the breeding congregations during the breeding season.

== Feeding ==
Roosterfish are generalist predators and eat many different things. They are important pelagic predators in the coastal regions where they occur. The results of analyzing the stomach contents of multiple roosterfish showed nine species of prey fish and one cephalopod. The most common prey item in the stomachs of the roosterfish was anchovies of the genus Anchoa. Roosterfish are known to feed in shallow lagoons and along shallow beaches. Roosterfish follow prey species to maintain high nutritional content throughout the year.

== Range ==
The native range of roosterfish is nearshore flats in the Pacific Ocean. The northern extent of their range is the Pacific Ocean and the Gulf of California surrounding the Baja Peninsula. They are present along the coast of Central America to Peru in South America and in the Galapagos archipelago and Malpelo Island.

== Conservation ==
The International Union for Conservation of Nature (IUCN) had roosterfish listed as globally data deficient until 2024 when they were classified as Least Concern. There are several efforts to increase global knowledge about roosterfish, notably efforts by the International Game Fish Association to fund roosterfish research.

== Angling ==
Roosterfish are a popular sport fish, and they can be caught in many different ways. The most popular method is by using live bait. They can also be caught on fly rods. When fly fishing, anglers commonly use natural colored salt streamers and shrimp patterns. These fish can also be caught with topwater flies and lures or silver poppers. Roosterfish can be very cost efficient to hunt because they can be caught from the beach. By walking up and down the beach an angler can spot them chasing fish in the shallows. Most success is yielded by getting in front of the fish and letting it approach. For spin fishing, a longer heavy action rod is best when casting these big lures and poppers, and no smaller than a 10wt rod for fly fishing. Having a large arbor reel that has the capacity to hold a significant amount of backing is necessary when targeting these fish. Typically an intermediate of sinking line that matches the weight of the rod is best when fishing streamers. A floating line is used when fishing top water.

The current all tackle records for roosterfish are 114.0 lb (51.71 kg) and 163 cm (64 in). The weight of the average fish hooked is about 20 lb (9 kg). Catch and release is strongly recommended.
