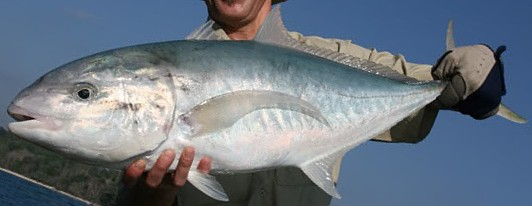

Conservation status
- Least Concern (IUCN 3.1)

Scientific classification
- Kingdom: Animalia
- Phylum: Chordata
- Class: Actinopterygii
- Order: Carangiformes
- Suborder: Carangoidei
- Family: Carangidae
- Genus: Carangoides
- Species: C. gymnostethus

Binomial name
- Carangoides gymnostethus (G. Cuvier, 1833)
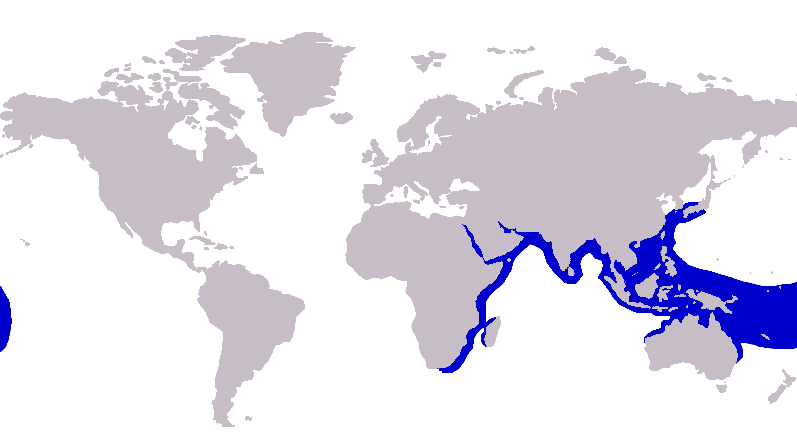
- Approximate range of the bludger

Synonyms
- Caranx gymnostethus Cuvier, 1833; Carangoides gymnostethoides Bleeker, 1851; Caranx gymnostethoides (Bleeker, 1851); Ferdauia claeszooni prestonensis Whitley, 1947

= Bludger (fish) =

Species of fish

The bludger (Carangoides gymnostethus), also known as the bludger trevally, nakedbreast trevally or Bleeker's jackfish, is a widespread species of large marine fish in the jack family, Carangidae. The bludger inhabits the tropical and subtropical regions of the Indo-west Pacific Ocean, distributed from South Africa in the west to Japan and New Caledonia in the east. It is a large fish, growing to a maximum recorded length of 90 cm, and is very similar to the yellowspotted trevally, Carangoides fulvoguttatus, but can be separated by the complete absence of breast scales and a number of other anatomical features. The species inhabits moderately deep offshore coral and rocky reefs, where it preys on small crustaceans and fish. The reproductive biology of the species is poorly known, but it appears to move to more tropical waters to spawn. The bludger is of intermediate importance to fisheries throughout its range, taken by hook and line and various netting methods. It is of some value to anglers also, considered a good gamefish, but generally regarded as poor eating due to its soft oily flesh, which is used as bait by many anglers. The name 'bludger' is said to either refer to the blunt head of the species, or the destination of the fish when caught by professional fishermen who treat the fish as discard.

== Taxonomy and naming ==
The bludger is classified within the genus Carangoides, a group of fish commonly known as jacks and trevallies. Carangoides falls into the jack and horse mackerel family Carangidae, the Carangidae are part of the order Carangiformes.

The species was first scientifically described by the famed French naturalist Georges Cuvier in 1833 based on the holotype specimen taken in the Seychelles. Cuvier named his species Caranx gymnostethus, with the specific epithet meaning 'naked breast' in reference to its scaleless breast. The species was later reassigned to the genus Carangoides, where it has remained since. In 1851, Pieter Bleeker named what he believed to be a new species Carangoides gymnostethoides, which literally translates as 'like Carangoides gymnostethus', indicating its similarity to the bludger. This was later found to be the same as Carangoides gymnostethus and became a junior synonym. Confusion with Carangoides orthogrammus in Hawaiian waters led John Nichols to propose subspecies of Carangoides gymnostethoides due to slight anatomical differences. These taxa possibly represent misidentified C. orthogrammus, although Nichols meticulous distinction of the species may indicate a population of the species may exist in Hawaii, although these subspecies have largely been ignored by taxonomic authorities and remained unresolved. The species has the unusual common name of 'bludger', which is said to have arisen by one of two ways; either due to the blunt shape of the species snout or a description of the eventual destination of the fish when caught by professional fishermen seeking more desirable catches. In both cases, the word 'bludger' refers to an object used to bludgeon.

== Description ==
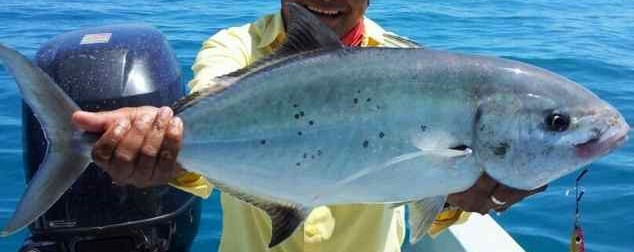
The bludger has a more cylindrical body than most of its relatives

The bludger is a large fish, growing to at least 90 cm in length and reaching a recorded maximum weight of 14.5 kg.

The bludger has a body shape very similar to the yellowspotted trevally, being more elongated and subcylindricall than most of the genus Carangoides. As a juvenile, the fish is ovate, becoming more elongated with age, with the convex dorsal profile of the head and nape becoming less steep with age also. The dorsal fin is in two distinct parts, the first consisting of 8 spines while the second is composed of 1 spines and 28 to 32 soft rays, with the anterior lobe of this fin being shorter than the head length. The anal fin has two anteriorly detached spines followed by 1 spine attached to 24 to 26 soft rays and the pelvic fin has 1 spine and 18 to 20 soft rays. The lateral line has a gentle anterior arch which is slightly longer than the straight section of the lateral line, with the intersection below the sixteenth to twentieth soft ray of the dorsal fin. The curved section contains 78 to 80 scales while the straight section consists of 15 to 19 scales and 21 to 27 scutes. The breast is scaleless until the origin of the pelvic fins and up to the origin of the pectoral fins. In adults, the mouth cleft is level with the eye, with both jaws containing bands of villiform teeth which become wider anteriorly. There are 27 to 31 gill rakers in total and 25 vertebrae.

The bludger has an overall silver-green body as a juvenile, while adults have green-blue to olive green body above, becoming more silvery below. At all stages of its life, the fish has a few brown or golden spots in a midlateral band, but much less than the yellowspotted trevally, while the dusky opercular spot is often inconspicuous. The dorsal, anal and caudal fins are olive green, with the soft dorsal, anal and anal fins having white lobe tips and the anal having white leading and distal edge. The pelvic and pectoral fins are hyaline to green.

== Distribution and habitat ==
The bludger is distributed throughout the tropical to subtropical regions of the Indian and west Pacific Oceans, ranging from South Africa in the west, along east Africa and north to the Red Sea. Its distribution in the Indian Ocean extends east to India, South East Asia, Indonesia and as far south as northern Australia. In the Pacific Ocean, it extends as far north as Japan and out to New Caledonia, Tonga and the Kapingamarangi Atoll.

The bludger inhabits moderately deep offshore waters on rocky and coral reef structures, rarely found in inshore waters.

== Biology and fishery ==
The bludger moves in small schools as a juvenile, becoming more solitary with age. The species has a rather soft mouth and weak jaws, limiting the types of prey available to it, with studies showing prawns, small crabs, mantis shrimps and small fish are its main prey. Research on the North West Shelf of Australia indicates there is diet partitioning between the bludger and the yellowspotted trevally, with the bludger taking mostly crustaceans while the yellowspotted trevally consumes mostly fish and cephalopods. The species itself is known to be prey for sharks including the blacktip shark, Carcharhinus tilstoni. Reproduction and growth in the species is poorly studied, with preliminary observations in South Africa indicating the fish may move from this region to more tropical waters of Mozambique to spawn.

The bludger is of minor importance to fisheries throughout its range, taken by hook and line as well as gill nets and various types of fish trap. Separate catch statistics are not kept for the species, as it is often not distinguished from other trevallies. The bludger is also of some interest to anglers, although the level of interest differs between countries. In South Africa it is considered a good catch by boat anglers and spearfishermen and is generally regarded as high quality table fare. In Australia it is still considered a good gamefish, but of a lower caliber than related species such as giant and bluefin trevally, and is regarded as a poor table fish. Its soft, oily flesh is often used for bait when reef fishing. It may be caught using small baits or lures.
