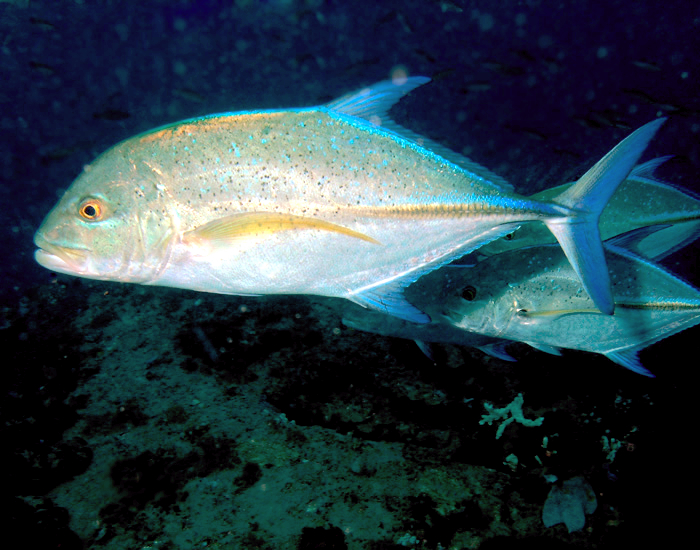
- Bluefin trevally (Caranx melampygus)
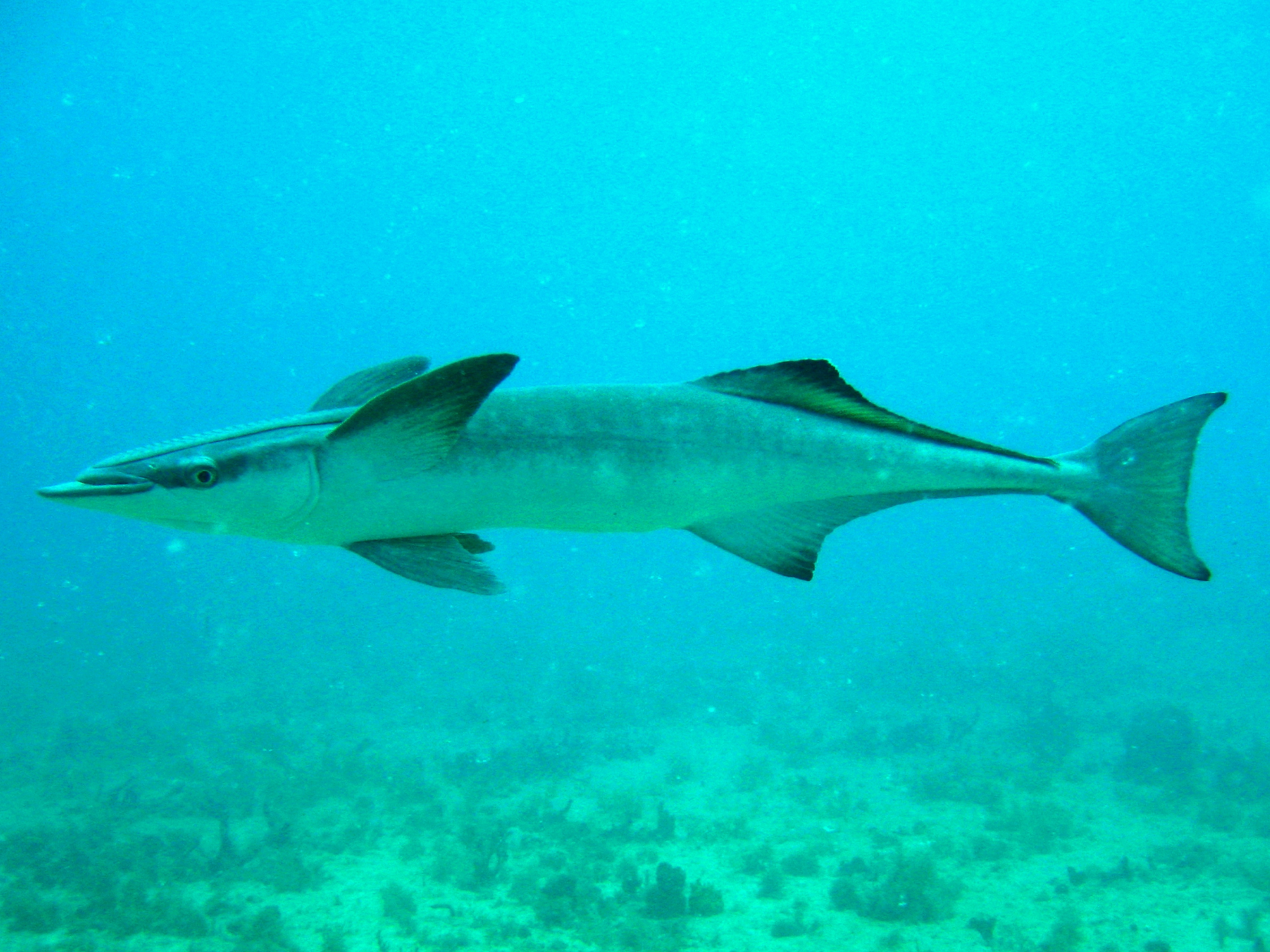
- Remora remora

Scientific classification
- Kingdom: Animalia
- Phylum: Chordata
- Class: Actinopterygii
- Division: Teleostei
- Clade: Percomorpha
- Order: Carangiformes; Jordan, 1923

Type species
- Caranx praeustus Anonymous [ Bennett ], 1830

= Carangiformes =

Carangiformes Temporal range: Danian–present

Order of fishes

Carangiformes is a large and diverse order of ray-finned fishes within the clade Percomorpha. It is part of a sister clade to the Ovalentaria, alongside its sister group, the Anabantaria (including Anabantiformes and Synbranchiformes). The order includes ecologically diverse groups such as the jacks and trevallies, flatfishes, barracudas, billfishes, and archerfishes.

The Carangiformes has traditionally been regarded as a monotypic order with only the family Carangidae within it by taxonomic authorities; other families currently part of the order were previously classified as part of the wider order Perciformes. The 5th edition of Fishes of the World classify six families within Carangiformes, with more recent authorities expanding the order to include up to 30 families, based on phylogenetic evidence.

== Description ==
While the expanded order Carangiformes is primarily defined by molecular data, the core group (suborder Carangoidei) shares specific synapomorphies:

- One or two tubular ossifications (prenasals) extending from the nasal bone, a trait shared with the archerfishes.
- Small, adherent cycloid scales.

Most carangiforms are medium to large-sized predatory fish, ranging from 22 cm (8.7 in) to 2.5 m (8.2 ft) in length. Body shapes vary from slender and fusiform (e.g., barracudas, cobia) to deep-bodied and laterally compressed (e.g., trevallies, moonfish, flatfishes). Most species are marine, inhabiting primarily tropical and subtropical waters, though some are able to live in freshwater during certain parts of their lives (giant trevally, all archerfish), and some live entirely in freshwater (river tonguesole).

== Classification ==
The order Carangiformes has historically been either subsumed within Perciformes or used exclusively for the families in the suborder Carangoidei (Carangidae, Coryphaenidae, Rachycentridae, Echeneidae, and Nematistiidae). However, recent genetic studies have redefined the group to resolve the paraphyly of Perciformes, incorporating many more groups such as the highly specialized flatfishes.

The earliest known carangiform fossils are unnamed members of Carangidae and Menidae from the Paleocene (Danian) strata from the Dakhla Formation (Egypt) and species of the moonfish genus Mene from the Late Paleocene of Peru and Tunisia.

=== Taxonomy ===
The following classification follows Eschmeyer's Catalog of Fishes (2026):

- Order Carangiformes
  - Suborder Centropomoidei
    - Family Latidae Jordan 1888 (giant perches)
    - Family Centropomidae Poey 1967 (snooks)
    - Family Lactariidae Boulenger 1904 (false trevallies)
    - Family Sphyraenidae Rafinesque 1815 (barracudas)
  - Suborder Pleuronectoidei
    - Family Polynemidae Rafinesque 1815 (threadfins or tassel-fishes)
    - Family Psettodidae Regan 1910 (spiny turbots)
    - Family Citharidae de Buen 1935 (largescale flounders)
    - Family Scophthalmidae Chabanaud 1933 (turbots)
    - Family Cyclopsettidae Campbell et al. 2019 (sand whiffs or large-tooth flounders)
    - Family Grammatobothidae
    - Family Monolenidae
    - Family Taeniopsettidae
    - Family Bothidae Smitt 1892 (lefteye flounders)
    - Family Paralichthyidae Regan 1910 (sand flounders)
    - Family Pleuronectidae Rafinesque 1815 (righteye flounders)
      - Subfamily Atheresthinae Vinnikov, Thomson & Munroe 2018
      - Subfamily Pleuronichthyinae Vinnikov, Thomson & Munroe 2018
      - Subfamily Microstominae Cooper & Chapleau 1998 (smallmouth flounders)
      - Subfamily Hippoglossinae Gill 1864 (halibuts)
      - Subfamily Pleuronectinae Rafinesque 1815 (true flounders)
    - Family Paralichthodidae Regan 1920 (peppered flounders)
    - Family Oncopteridae Jordan & Goss 1889 (remo flounders)
    - Family Rhombosoleidae Regan 1910 (South Pacific flounders)
    - Family Achiropsettidae Heemstra 1990 (southern flounders or armless flounders)
    - Family Achiridae Rafinesque 1815 (American soles)
    - Family Samaridae Jordan & Goss 1889 (crested flounders)
    - Family Poecilopsettidae Norman 1934 (bigeye flounders)
    - Family Soleidae Bonaparte 1833 (soles)
    - Family Cynoglossidae Jordan 1888 (tonguefishes)
      - Subfamily Symphurinae Ochiai 1963 (straightsnout tongue soles)
      - Subfamily Cynoglossinae Jordan 1888 (hookedsnout tongue soles)
  - Suborder Toxotoidei
    - Family Leptobramidae Ogilby 1913 (beachsalmons)
    - Family Toxotidae Bleeker 1859 (archerfishes)
  - Suborder Nematistioidei
    - Family Nematistiidae Gill 1862 (roosterfishes)
  - Suborder Menoidei
    - Family Menidae Fitzinger 1873 (moonfishes)
    - Family Xiphiidae Rafinesque 1815 (swordfishes)
    - Family Istiophoridae Rafinesque 1815 (billfishes and marlins)
  - Suborder Carangoidei
    - Family Carangidae Rafinesque 1815 (jacks or jack mackerels)
      - Subfamily Naucratinae Bleeker 1859 (amberjacks)
      - Subfamily Caranginae Rafinesque 1815 (trevallies and kingfishes)
    - Family Trachinotidae
      - Subfamily Scomberoidinae Jordan & Gilbert 1883 (leatherjackets and queenfishes)
      - Subfamily Trachinotinae Gill 1861 (pompanos)
    - Family Echeneidae Rafinesque 1810 (remoras and sharksuckers)
    - Family Rachycentridae Gill 1896 (cobias)
    - Family Coryphaenidae Rafinesque 1815 (dolphinfishes)

The following fossil families are also known:

- Order Carangiformes
  - ?Family †Pygaeidae Jordan, 1905
  - Suborder Pleuronectoidei
    - Family †Amphistiidae Boulenger, 1902
    - Family †Joleaudichthyidae Chabanaud, 1937
  - Suborder Menoidei
    - Family †Palaeorhynchidae Günther, 1880
    - Family †Hemingwayidae Sytchevskaya & Prokofiev, 2002
    - Family †Blochiidae Bleeker, 1859
    - Family †Xiphiorhynchidae Regan, 1909
  - Suborder Carangoidei
    - Family †Ductoridae Blot, 1969
    - Family †Opisthomyzonidae Jordan, 1923

=== Phylogenies ===
The following cladogram is based on a 2023 phylogenetic analysis which studied the UCEs of various marine fish:

- Carangiformes
  - - - Centropomidae
        Centropomus
      - Latidae
        Lates
    - - Lactariidae
        Lactarius
      - Sphyraenidae
        Sphyraena
  - - - Polynemidae
        Polydactylus
      - - Citharidae
          Citharoides
        - Psettodidae
          Psettodes
    - - Carangoidei
        - Carangidae
          - Caranginae
          - Naucratinae
        - - Echeneidae
          - Trachinotidae
      - - - Leptobramidae
            Leptobrama
          - Toxotidae
            Toxotes
        - - Nematistiidae
            Nematistius
          - - Menidae
              Mene
            - - Xiphiidae
                Xiphias
              - Istiophoridae
                - - Istiophorus
                  - Makaira
                - - Kajikia
                  - Tetrapturus

==== Internal relationships of Carangoidei ====
Within the suborder Carangoidei, Coryphaenidae, Rachycentridae, and Echeneidae have been suggested to comprise a monophyletic grouping (dubbed "Echeneoidea"), which has been recovered as a sister clade to the Carangidae. Additionally, the family Carangidae is paraphyletic in the traditional sense; the "Echeneoidea" clade are more closely related to two carangid subfamilies (Scomberoidinae and Trachinotinae) than they are to the other two subfamilies (Naucratinae and Caranginae). This has been consistently found by studies, which propose the elevation of the subfamily Trachinotinae into the family Trachinotidae to reflect this finding.

The following cladogram is based on Girard et al.'s 2020 study of UCEs and morphology:

- Carangoidei
  - Carangidae
    - Caranginae
    - Naucratinae
  - - Trachinotidae
      - Scomberoidinae
      - Trachinotinae
    - Echeneoidea
      - Coryphaenidae
      - - Echeneidae
        - Rachycentridae

The following cladogram is based on a 2023 phylogenetic analysis which studied the UCEs of various marine fish:

- Carangoidei
  - - Trachinotidae
      - Trachinotinae
        Trachinotus
      - - Lichia
        - Scomberoidinae
          - Oligoplites
          - Scomberoides
    - Echeneidae
      - - Rachycentron canadum
        - - Coryphaena equiselis
          - Coryphaena hippurus
      - - Remora
        - - Echeneis neucratoides
          - - Echeneis naucrates
            - Phtheirichthys lineatus
  - Carangidae
    - Naucratinae
      - Elagatis bipinnulata
      - - Seriola fasciata
        - - - Seriola hippos
            - - Seriolina nigrofasciata
              - - Seriola dumerili
                - Seriola rivoliana
          - - Seriola zonata
            - - Seriola quinqueradiata
              - - Naucrates ductor
                - Seriola lalandi
    - Caranginae
      ⊞98 species analyzed
      ⊟
      - - - Selar crumenophthalmus
          - - Carangoides equula
            - Pseudocaranx dentex
        - - - - Trachurus symmetricus
              - - Trachurus capensis
                - Trachurus trachurus
            - - - Trachurus lathami
                - Trachurus trecae
              - - - Trachurus delagoa
                  - Trachurus indicus
                - - Trachurus japonicus
                  - Trachurus novaezelandiae
          - - Decapterus punctatus
            - - Caranx rhonchus
              - - Decapterus akaadsi
                - - - Decapterus macarellus
                    - Decapterus muroadsi
                  - - - Decapterus macrosoma
                      - - Decapterus maruadsi
                        - Decapterus russelli
                    - - Decapterus smithvanizi
                      - - Decapterus kurroides
                        - Decapterus tabl
      - - - - - Carangoides ferdau
              - Carangoides orthogrammus
            - - - Carangoides humerosus
                - - Carangoides chrysophrys
                  - Carangoides dinema
              - - Parastromateus niger
                - - Uraspis uraspis
                  - - Uraspis helvola
                    - Uraspis secunda
          - - - - Alectis ciliaris
                - - Alectis alexandrina
                  - Alectis indica
              - - Carangoides otrynter
                - - - Selene brevoortii
                    - Selene vomer
                  - - Selene brownii
                    - - Selene peruviana
                      - - Selene dorsalis
                        - Selene setapinnis
            - - Carangoides bajad
              - - - - Atropus atropos
                    - Carangoides hedlandensis
                  - - - Carangoides armatus
                      - Carangoides talamparoides
                    - - Ulua aurochs
                      - Ulua mentalis
                - - Carangoides plagiotaenia
                  - - - Carangoides coeruleopinnatus
                      - Carangoides malabaricus
                    - - Carangoides fulvoguttatus
                      - - Carangoides gymnostethus
                        - Carangoides oblongus
        - - - Gnathanodon speciosus
            - Selaroides leptolepis
          - - - Carangoides praeustus
              - - - - Chloroscombrus chrysurus
                    - Chloroscombrus orqueta
                  - - Hemicaranx amblyrhynchus
                    - Hemicaranx zelotes
                - - - Alepes melanoptera
                    - Alepes vari
                  - - Atule mate
                    - - Alepes djedaba
                      - - Alepes kleinii
                        - - Alepes apercna
                          - Pantolabus radiatus
            - - - Caranx senegallus
                - - - Caranx bartholomaei
                    - Caranx ruber
                  - - Caranx caballus
                    - - Caranx crysos
                      - Caranx hippos
              - - Caranx bucculentus
                - - Megalaspis cordyla
                  - - - Caranx fischeri
                      - - Caranx caninus
                        - Caranx vinctus
                    - - - Caranx melampygus
                        - Caranx tille
                      - - - Caranx ignobilis
                          - - Caranx heberi
                            - Caranx lugubris
                        - - Caranx latus
                          - - Caranx papuensis
                            - Caranx sexfasciatus
