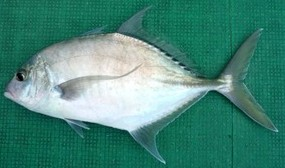

Conservation status
- Least Concern (IUCN 3.1)

Scientific classification
- Kingdom: Animalia
- Phylum: Chordata
- Class: Actinopterygii
- Order: Carangiformes
- Suborder: Carangoidei
- Family: Carangidae
- Genus: Carangichthys
- Species: C. dinema

Binomial name
- Carangichthys dinema (Bleeker, 1851)
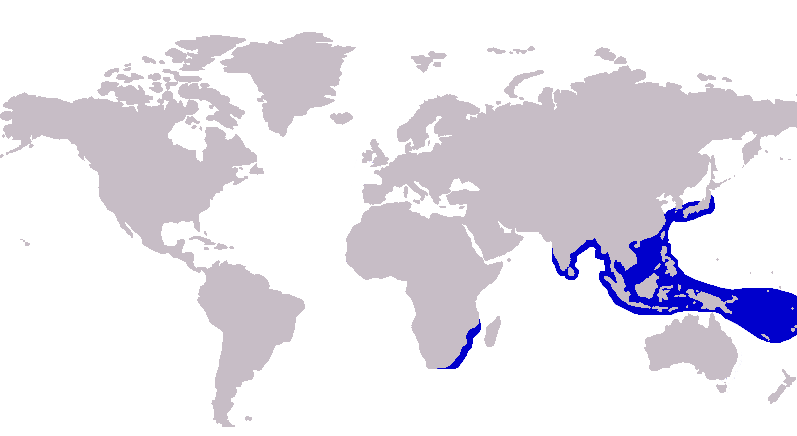
- Approximate range of the shadow trevally

Synonyms
- Carangoides dinema Bleeker, 1851; Caranx dinema (Bleeker, 1851); Carangichthys typus Bleeker, 1853; Caranx longipes Steindachner, 1906

= Shadow trevally =

Species of ray-finned fish

The shadow trevally (Carangichthys dinema), also known as the shadow kingfish, twothread trevally or Aldabra trevally, is a species of inshore marine fish in the jack family Carangidae. The species is patchily distributed throughout the tropical and subtropical waters of the Indian and west Pacific Oceans, from South Africa in the west to Japan and Samoa in the east, reaching as far south as Indonesia and New Caledonia. It is most easily distinguished from similar species by as series of dark rectangular blotches under the second dorsal fin, giving a 'shadowed' appearance, from which its common name is derived. The shadow trevally is a reasonably large fish, growing to 85 cm in length and at least 2.6 kg in weight. It inhabits shallow coastal waters, including reefs, bays, and estuaries, where it takes small fish and benthic crustaceans as prey. Nothing is known of the species' ecology and reproductive biology. It is of little importance to fisheries, and is occasionally taken by bottom trawls and other artisanal fishing gear.

== Taxonomy and naming ==
The shadow trevally is presently classified within the genus Carangichthys, one of a number of genera referred to as trevallies. Carangichthys is further classified in the family Carangidae, and Carangidae is part of the order Carangiformes.

The species was first scientifically described and named by the Dutch ichthyologist Pieter Bleeker in 1851 based on a specimen collected from the waters off Jakarta, located on Java in Indonesia, which was designated to be the holotype. He named this new species Carangoides dinema, with the specific name derived from the Latin dis, meaning two and the Greek nema, meaning thread, referring to the fin anatomy of the species. The species is quite unique in the comparatively simple taxonomic history it has, with other related species often renamed and transferred between genera many times. The species is most commonly termed the 'shadow trevally' or 'shadow kingfish' in reference to a series of small dark blotches positioned on the upper side, underneath the second dorsal fin, giving the appearance of shadow from the fin itself. Other names used for the species include 'two-thread trevally' and 'Aldabra trevally'.

== Description ==
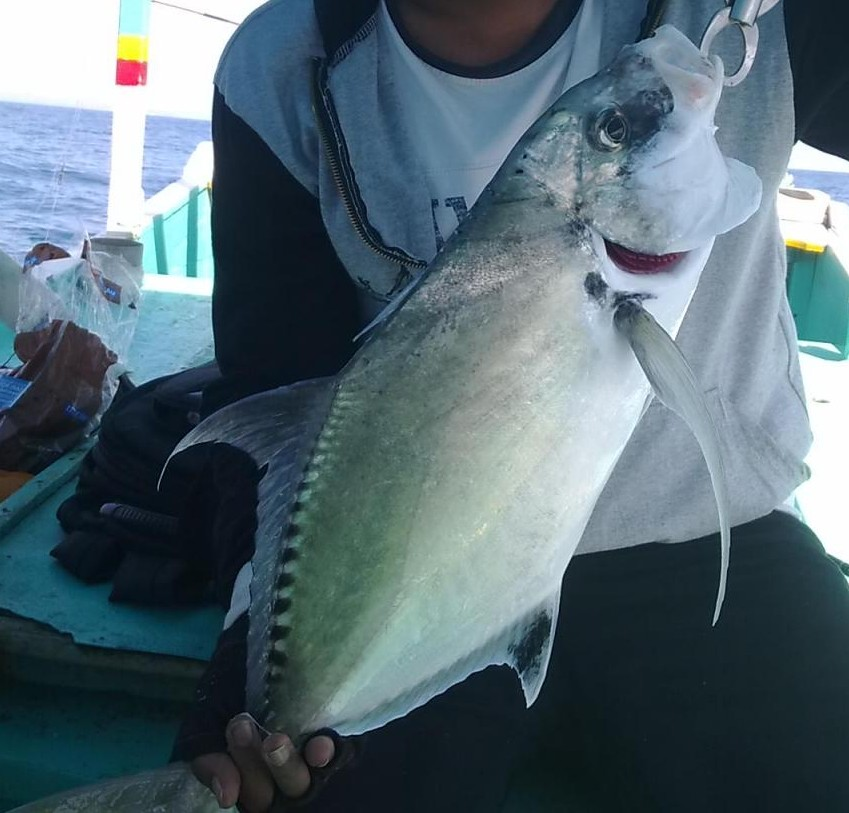
An angler's catch of shadow trevally

The shadow trevally is similar in form to a number of other jacks in the family Carangidae, having an almost ovate, strongly compressed body. It is fairly large fish, growing to a maximum known length of 85 cm and a recorded weight of 2.6 kg. The dorsal profile is strongly convex, while the ventral profile is less so, even tending to be concave between the snout and the anal fin, while the nape is elevated and almost straight in profile. There are two separate dorsal fins, the first consisting of 8 spines and second of a single spine and 17 to 19 soft rays. The lobe of the second dorsal fin is elongated, being greater than the head length. The anal fin is composed of two anteriorly detached spines followed by a single spine and 15 to 17 soft rays. The lateral line has a moderate arch anteriorly, with the junction of the curved and straight sections below the tenth or twelfth soft rays of the second dorsal fin. The curved section of the lateral line is slightly longer than the straight section, and contains 60 to 63 scales, while the straight part contains no to six scales followed by 23 to 30 scutes. The breast is devoid of scales ventrally to behind the pelvic fin origin and up to the pectoral fin base, although in rare cases this is interrupted by a lateral band of scales. Both jaws contain bands of small teeth, with the bands becoming wider anteriorly, and the upper jaw also has an irregular outer series of moderately large teeth, with large specimens also showing this in the lower jaw. It has a total of 24 to 28 gill rakers and 24 vertebrae.

In life, the shadow trevally is a bluish-green colour above, fading to a silvery white on the underside. It takes its common name from a series of small black-brown rectangular blotches which become larger posteriorly on its back between the bases of the second dorsal fin rays. Also, a dark-brown, diffuse blotch is present on the operculum. The spinous dorsal fin is pale to dusky, while the second dorsal fin lobe is dusky with the ray tips yellowish. The anal fin distal margin is whitish-blue, and the caudal fin has a yellowish upper lobe and pale trailing edges and lower lobe tip. The pectoral fins are hyaline and the pelvic fins are whitish to dusky.

== Distribution and habitat ==
The shadow trevally is distributed patchily throughout the tropical to subtropical waters of the Indian and west Pacific Oceans. The species' westernmost limit is a section of the east African coast from South Africa to Tanzania. No records exist for the species further north until India and Sri Lanka. In the Pacific, the species is known from China, Korea, Southeast Asia, and the Indonesian and Philippines island chains. Its easternmost limit extends to Taiwan and Japan in the north and a number of small island groups including Tonga and Samoa in the south.

The shadow trevally inhabits coastal waters at depths generally less than 15 m. It is known to Kruise in small schools along the shallow edge of steep reef drop-offs, and has also been recorded from bays and estuaries. The species has been recorded around shipwrecks, and one study showed it was one of the first fish to move in after a ship was scuttled.

== Biology and fishery ==
The biology and ecology of the shadow trevally is poorly known. It is known to live either in small schools or individually, and is a predatory fish, taking small fish and benthic crustaceans. Nothing is known of its movements or reproduction.

The shadow trevally is of little importance to fisheries throughout its range, taken as bycatch and generally not distinguished from other carangid species. It is often taken by bottom trawls and various kinds of artisanal fishing gear.
