= Gill raker =

Bony or cartilaginous processes that project from the branchial arch

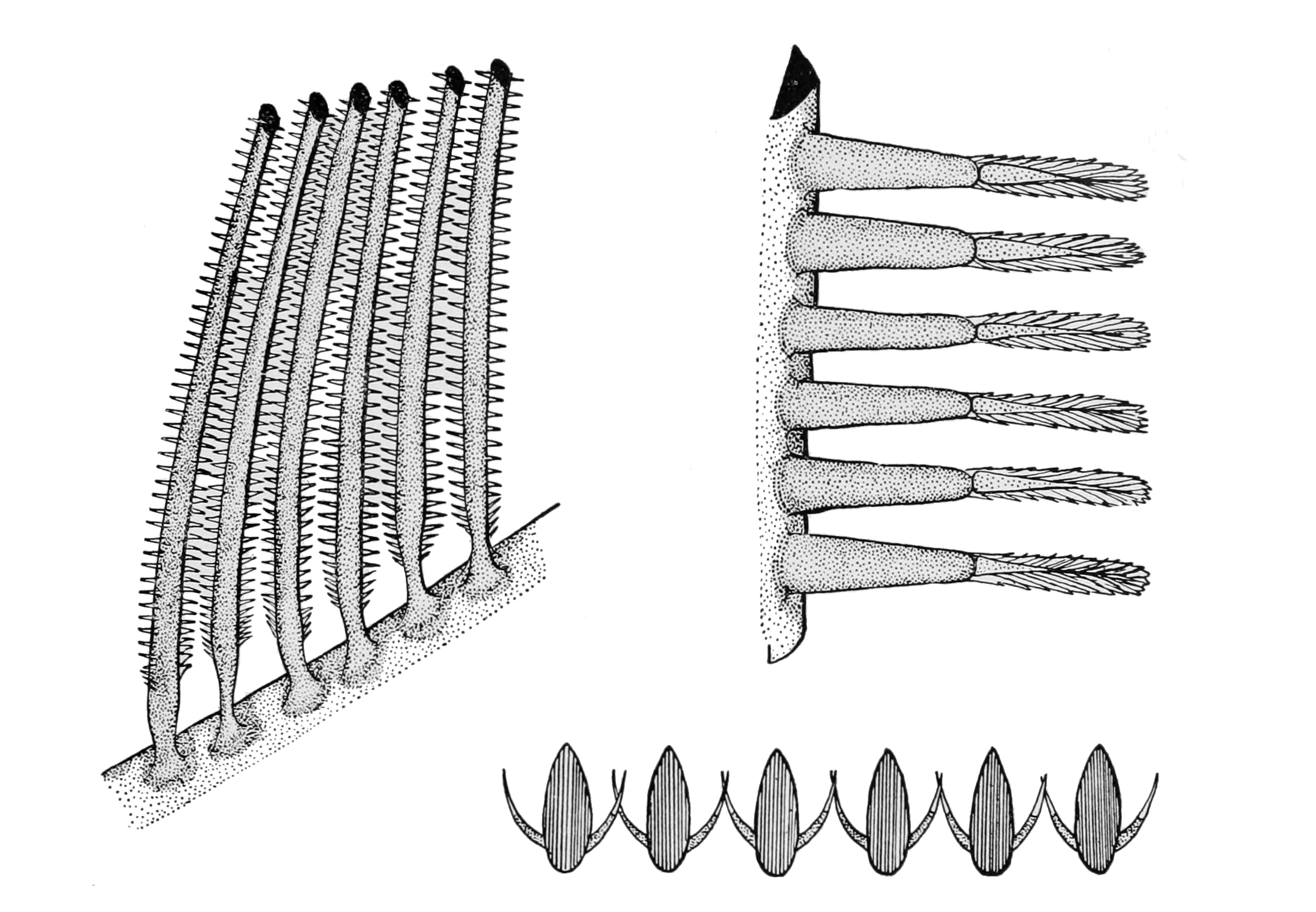
Top left: Gill-rakers attached to the branchial arch, showing the projecting rows of hooks (×50) Top right: Hooks attached to the gill-raker (×180) Bottom: Gill-rakers in cross section, showing angle at which hooks project from their point of attachment (water flow is downwards)

Gill rakers in fish are bony or cartilaginous processes that project from the branchial arch (gill arch) and are involved with suspension feeding tiny prey. They are not to be confused with the gill filaments that compose the fleshy part of the gill used for gas exchange. Rakers are usually present in two rows, projecting from both the anterior and posterior side of each gill arch. Rakers are widely varied in number, spacing, and form. By preventing food particles from exiting the spaces between the gill arches, they enable the retention of food particles in filter feeders.

The structure and spacing of gill rakers in fish determines the size of food particles trapped, and correlates with feeding behavior. Fish with densely spaced, elongated, comb-like gill rakers are efficient at filtering tiny prey, whereas carnivores and omnivores often have more widely spaced gill rakers with secondary projections. Because gill raker characters often vary between closely related taxa, they are commonly used in the classification and identification of fish species. Much of the variation in gill raker morphology is thought to be due to adaptation to optimize the consumption of different diets.

To prevent the potentially damaging passage of solid material through the gill slits and over the gill filaments, early gill rakers strained large particles from the water and diverted them to the esophagus. Since an appreciable fraction of this material was nutritious, rakers subsequently evolved as food-trapping mechanisms in filter feeders. Gill rakers, when long and closely set, play the same role in suspension-feeding fish such as herring, mullet, megamouth, basking and whale sharks, as baleen in the filter-feeding whales.

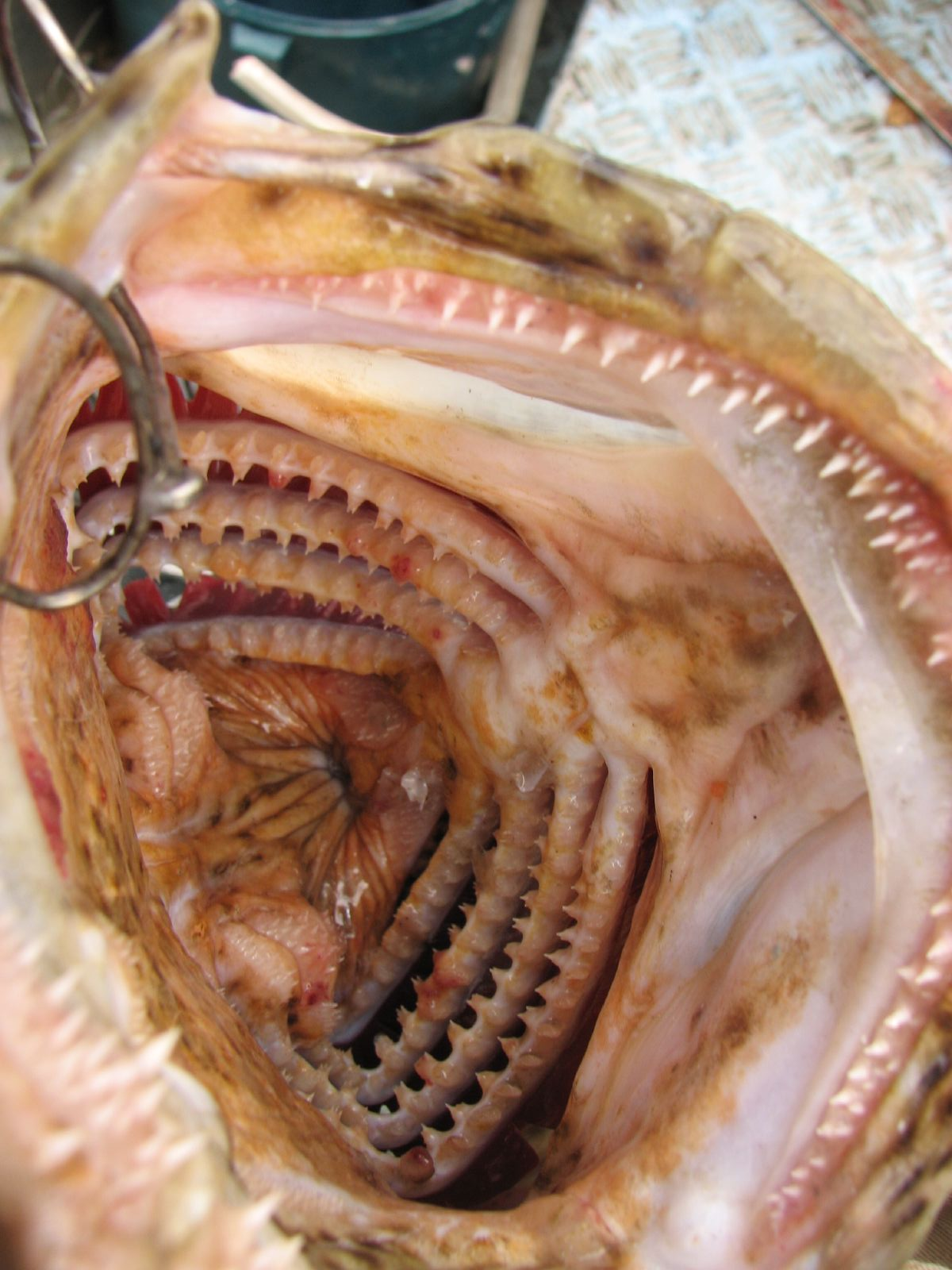
Gill rakers of an orange-spotted grouper, Epinephelus coioides
