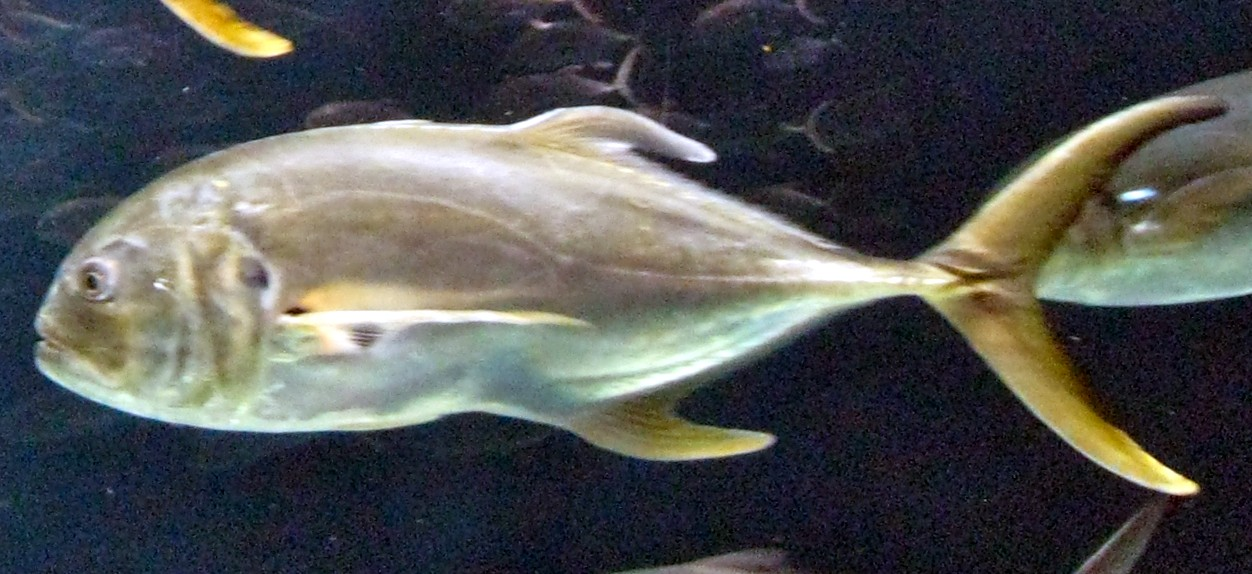
- Crevalle jack (Caranx hippos)

Scientific classification
- Kingdom: Animalia
- Phylum: Chordata
- Class: Actinopterygii
- Division: Teleostei
- Order: Carangiformes
- Suborder: Carangoidei
- Family: Carangidae
- Subfamily: Caranginae; Rafinesque, 1815

= Caranginae =

Subfamily of fishes

Caranginae is a subfamily of ray-finned fish from the family Carangidae which consists of 29 genera and 104 species.

== Genera ==
The following genera are classified within the Caranginae:

Image	Genus	Species
	Alectis Rafinesque, 1815	African pompano (Alectis ciliaris)
	Alepes Swainson, 1839	Alepes apercna E. M. Grant, 1987 (Smallmouth scad); Alepes djedaba (Forsskål, 1775) (Shrimp scad); Alepes kleinii (Bloch, 1793) (Razorbelly scad); Alepes melanoptera (Swainson, 1839) (Blackfin scad); Alepes vari (G. Cuvier, 1833) (Herring scad)
	Atropus Oken, 1817	Atropus armatus (Rüppell, 1830) (longfin trevally); Atropus atropos (Bloch & Schneider, 1801) (cleftbelly trevally); Atropus aurochs (J. D. Ogilby, 1915) (silvermouth trevally); Atropus hedlandensis (Whitley, 1934) (bumpnose trevally); Atropus mentalis (G. Cuvier, 1833) (longrakered trevally)
	Atule D.S. Jordan & E.K. Jordan, 1922	yellowtail scad (Atule mate)
	Carangichthys Bleeker, 1853	Carangichthys dinema (Bleeker, 1851) (shadow trevally); Carangichthys humerosus (McCulloch, 1915) (duskyshoulder trevally); Carangichthys oblongus (G. Cuvier, 1833) (coachwhip trevally)
	Carangoides Bleeker, 1851	Carangoides ire (Cuvier, 1833); Carangoides praeustus (Anonymous [ E. T. Bennett ], 1830) (brownback trevally)
	Caranx Lacepède, 1801	Caranx bartholomaei G. Cuvier, 1833 (yellow jack); Caranx bucculentus Alleyne & W. J. Macleay, 1877 (bluespotted trevally); Caranx caballus Günther, 1868 (green jack); Caranx caninus Günther, 1867 (Pacific crevalle jack); Caranx crysos (Mitchill, 1815) (blue runner); Caranx fischeri Smith-Vaniz & K. E. Carpenter, 2007 (longfin crevalle jack); Caranx heberi (J. W. Bennett, 1830) (blacktip trevally); Caranx hippos (Linnaeus, 1766) (crevalle jack); Caranx ignobilis (Forsskål, 1775) (giant trevally); Caranx latus Agassiz, 1831 (horse-eye jack); Caranx lugubris Poey, 1860 (black jack); Caranx melampygus G. Cuvier, 1833 (bluefin trevally); Caranx papuensis Alleyne & W. J. Macleay, 1877 (brassy trevally); Caranx rhonchus É. Geoffroy Saint-Hilaire, 1817 (false scad); Caranx ruber (Bloch, 1793) (bar jack); Caranx senegallus G. Cuvier, 1833 (Senegal jack); Caranx sexfasciatus Quoy & Gaimard, 1825 (bigeye trevally); Caranx tille G. Cuvier, 1833 (tille trevally); Caranx vinctus D. S. Jordan & C. H. Gilbert, 1882 (cocinero)
	Chloroscombrus Girard, 1858	Chloroscombrus chrysurus (Linnaeus, 1766) (Atlantic bumper); Chloroscombrus orqueta D. S. Jordan & C. H. Gilbert, 1883 (Pacific bumper)
	Craterognathus Kimura, Takeuchi & Yadome, 2022	barcheek trevally (Craterognathus plagiotaenia)
	Decapterus Bleeker, 1851	Decapterus akaadsi (T. Abe), 1958; Decapterus koheru (Hector, 1875) (koheru); Decapterus kurroides (Bleeker, 1855) (redtail scad); Decapterus macarellus (G. Cuvier, 1833) (mackerel scad); Decapterus macrosoma (Bleeker, 1851) (shortfin scad); Decapterus maruadsi (Temminck & Schlegel, 1843) (Japanese scad); Decapterus muroadsi (Temminck & Schlegel, 1844) (amberstripe scad); Decapterus punctatus (G. Cuvier, 1829) (round scad); Decapterus russelli (Rüppell, 1830) (Indian scad); Decapterus smithvanizi (Seishi Kimura, Katahira & Kuriiwa, 2013); Decapterus tabl (Berry, 1968) (roughear scad)
	Euprepocaranx Kimura, Takeuchi & Yadome, 2022	threadfin jack (Euprepocaranx dorsalis)
	Ferdauia Jordan, Evermann & Wakiya in Jordan, Evermann & Tanaka, 1927	Ferdauia ferdau (Forsskål, 1775) (blue trevally); Ferdauia orthogrammus (D. S. Jordan & C. H. Gilbert, 1882) (island trevally)
	Flavocaranx Kimura, Takeuchi & Yadome, 2022	orange-spotted trevally (Flavocaranx bajad)
	Gnathodon Bleeker, 1850	golden trevally (Gnathanodon speciosus)
	Hemicaranx Bleeker, 1862	Hemicaranx amblyrhynchus (G. Cuvier, 1833) (Bluntnose jack); Hemicaranx bicolor (Günther, 1860) (Bicolor jack); Hemicaranx leucurus (Günther, 1864) (Yellowfin jack); Hemicaranx zelotes C. H. Gilbert, 1898 (Blackfin jack)
	Kaiwarinus Suzuki, 1962	whitefin trevally (Kaiwarinus equula)
	Megalaspis Bleeker, 1851	torpedo scad (Megalaspis cordyla)
	Pantolabus Whitley, 1931	fringefin trevally (Pantolabus radiatus)
	Paraselene Kimura, Takeuchi & Yadome, 2022	Mexican moonfish (Paraselene orstedii)
	Parastromateus Bleeker, 1864	black pomfret (Parastromateus niger)
	Platycaranx Kimura, Takeuchi & Yadome, 2022	Platycaranx chrysophrys (G. Cuvier, 1833) (longnose trevally); Platycaranx malabaricus (Bloch & Schneider, 1801) (Malabar trevally); Platycaranx talamparoides (Bleeker, 1852) (imposter trevally)
	Pseudocaranx Bleeker, 1863	Pseudocaranx chilensis (Guichenot, 1848) (Juan Fernandez trevally); Pseudocaranx dentex (Bloch & J. G. Schneider, 1801) (White trevally); Pseudocaranx dinjerra Smith-Vaniz & Jelks, 2006; Pseudocaranx wrighti (Whitley, 1931) (Skipjack trevally)
	Scyris Cuvier, 1829	Scyris alexandrina (É. Geoffroy Saint-Hilaire, 1817) (African threadfish); Scyris indica (Ruppell, 1830) (Indian threadfish)
	Selar Bleeker, 1851	Selar boops (Cuvier, 1833) (Oxeye scad); Selar crumenophthalmus (Bloch, 1793) (Bigeye scad)
	Selaroides Bleeker, 1851	yellowstripe scad (Selaroides leptolepis)
	Selene Lacepède, 1802	Selene brevoortii (T. N. Gill, 1863) (Hairfin lookdown); Selene brownii (G. Cuvier, 1816) (Caribbean moonfish); Selene dorsalis (T. N. Gill, 1863) (African moonfish); Selene peruviana (Guichenot, 1866) (Peruvian moonfish); Selene setapinnis (Mitchill, 1815) (Atlantic moonfish); Selene spixii (Castelnau, 1855); Selene vomer (Linnaeus, 1758) (Lookdown)
	Trachurus Rafinesque, 1810	Trachurus capensis Castelnau, 1861 (Cape horse mackerel); Trachurus declivis (Jenyns, 1841) (greenback horse mackerel); Trachurus delagoa Nekrasov, 1970 (African scad); Trachurus indicus Nekrasov, 1966 (Arabian scad); Trachurus japonicus (Temminck & Schlegel, 1844) (Japanese jack mackerel); Trachurus lathami Nichols, 1920 (rough scad); Trachurus longimanus (Norman, 1935) (Crozet scad); Trachurus mediterraneus (Steindachner, 1868) (Mediterranean horse mackerel); Trachurus murphyi Nichols, 1920 (Chilean jack mackerel); Trachurus novaezelandiae J. Richardson, 1843 (yellowtail horse mackerel); Trachurus picturatus (S. Bowdich, 1825) (blue jack mackerel); Trachurus symmetricus (Ayres, 1855) (Pacific jack mackerel); Trachurus trachurus (Linnaeus, 1758) (Atlantic horse mackerel); Trachurus trecae Cadenat, 1950 (Cunene horse mackerel)
	Turrum Whitley, 1932	Turrum coeruleopinnatum (Rüppell, 1830) (coastal trevally); Turrum fulvoguttatum (Forsskål, 1775) (goldspotted trevally); Turrum gymnostethus (G. Cuvier, 1833) (bludger)
	Uraspis Bleeker, 1855	Uraspis helvola (J. R. Forster, 1801) (whitetongue jack); Uraspis secunda (Poey, 1860) (cottonmouth jack); Uraspis uraspis (Günther, 1860) (whitemouth jack)

The following cladogram is based on a 2023 phylogenetic analysis which studied the UCEs of various marine fish:

- Carangidae
  - Caranginae
    ⊞98 species analyzed
    ⊟
    - - - - - - - - - - - - Caranx papuensis
                          - Caranx sexfasciatus
                        - Caranx latus
                      - - - Caranx lugubris
                          - Caranx heberi
                        - Caranx ignobilis
                    - - Caranx tille
                      - Caranx melampygus
                  - - - Caranx vinctus
                      - Caranx caninus
                    - Caranx fischeri
                - Megalaspis cordyla
              - Caranx bucculentus
            - - - - - Caranx hippos
                    - Caranx crysos
                  - Caranx caballus
                - - Caranx ruber
                  - Caranx bartholomaei
              - Caranx senegallus
          - - - - - - - - Pantolabus radiatus
                        - Alepes apercna
                      - Alepes kleinii
                    - Alepes djedaba
                  - Atule mate
                - - Alepes vari
                  - Alepes melanoptera
              - - - Hemicaranx amblyrhynchus
                  - Hemicaranx zelotes
                - - Chloroscombrus orqueta
                  - Chloroscombrus chrysurus
            - Carangoides praeustus
        - - Selaroides leptolepis
          - Gnathanodon speciosus
      - - - - - - - - - - Carangoides oblongus
                        - Carangoides gymnostethus
                      - Carangoides fulvoguttatus
                    - - Carangoides malabaricus
                      - Carangoides coeruleopinnatus
                  - Carangoides plagiotaenia
                - - - - Ulua mentalis
                      - Ulua aurochs
                    - - Carangoides talamparoides
                      - Carangoides armatus
                  - - Carangoides hedlandensis
                    - Atropus atropos
              - Carangoides bajad
          - - - - - - - Selene setapinnis
                      - Selene dorsalis
                    - Selene peruviana
                  - Selene brownii
                - - Selene brevoortii
                  - Selene vomer
              - Carangoides otrynter
            - - - Alectis indica
                - Alectis alexandrina
              - Alectis ciliaris
        - - - - - - Uraspis secunda
                  - Uraspis helvola
                - Uraspis uraspis
              - Parastromateus niger
            - - - Carangoides chrysophrys
                - Carangoides dinema
              - Carangoides humerosus
          - - Carangoides orthogrammus
            - Carangoides ferdau
    - - - - - - - - - - Decapterus maruadsi
                      - Decapterus russelli
                    - Decapterus macrosoma
                  - - - Decapterus tabl
                      - Decapterus kurroides
                    - Decapterus smithvanizi
                - - Decapterus muroadsi
                  - Decapterus macarellus
              - Decapterus akaadsi
            - Caranx rhonchus
          - Decapterus punctatus
        - - - - - Trachurus japonicus
                - Trachurus novaezelandiae
              - - Trachurus indicus
                - Trachurus delagoa
            - - - Trachurus trecae
                - Trachurus lathami
          - - - - Trachurus trachurus
                - Trachurus capensis
            - Trachurus symmetricus
      - - - Pseudocaranx dentex
          - Carangoides equula
        - Selar crumenophthalmus
  - Naucratinae
