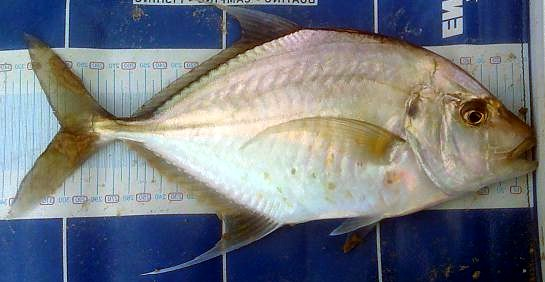
- Platycaranx chrysophrys

Scientific classification
- Kingdom: Animalia
- Phylum: Chordata
- Class: Actinopterygii
- Order: Carangiformes
- Suborder: Carangoidei
- Family: Carangidae
- Subfamily: Caranginae
- Genus: Platycaranx; Kimura et al., 2022

Species
- See text

= Platycaranx =

Genus of ray-finned fishes

Platycaranx is a genus of ray-finned fish in the family Carangidae. Its members were previously included in the genus Carangoides.

== Species ==
The currently recognized species in this genus are:

Image	Scientific name	Common name	Distribution
	Platycaranx chrysophrys (Cuvier, 1833)	longnose trevally	Indian and west Pacific Oceans from South Africa to New Zealand and Japan
	Platycaranx malabaricus (Bloch & Schneider, 1801)	Malabar trevally	Indian and west Pacific Oceans from South Africa in the west to Japan and Australia
	Platycaranx talamparoides (Bleeker, 1852)	imposter trevally	Indian and west Pacific oceans, from the Gulf of Oman in the west to Japan and Australia in the east
