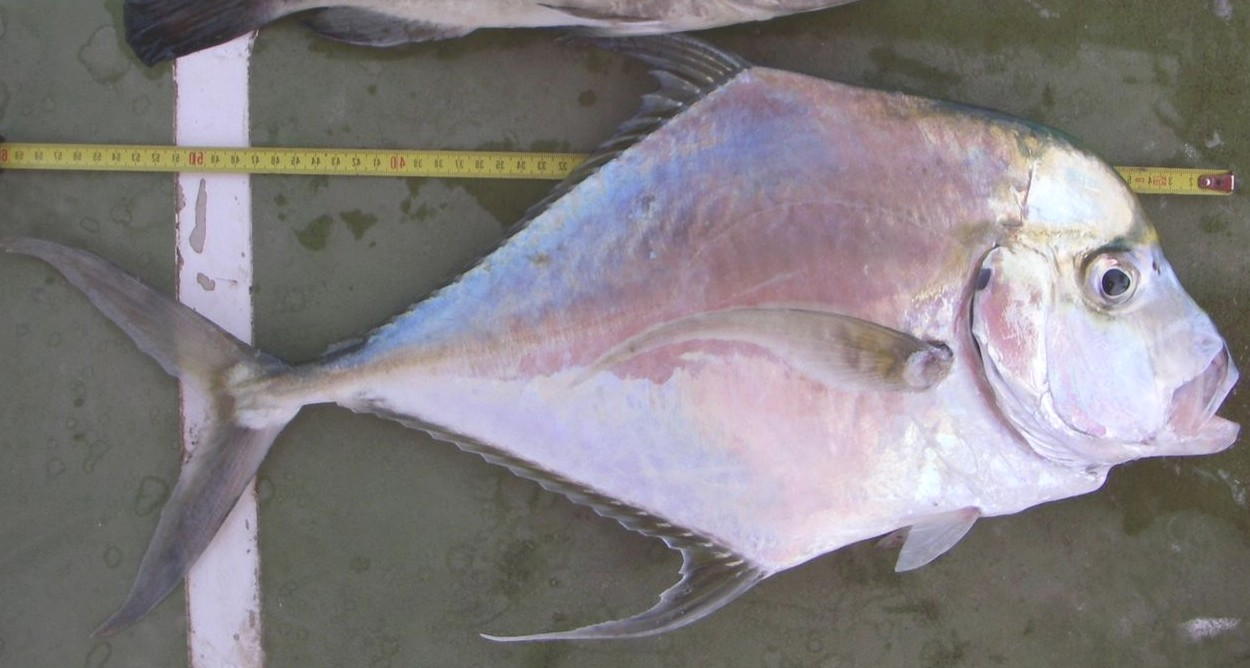
- Scyris alexandrina

Scientific classification
- Kingdom: Animalia
- Phylum: Chordata
- Class: Actinopterygii
- Order: Carangiformes
- Suborder: Carangoidei
- Family: Carangidae
- Subfamily: Caranginae
- Genus: Scyris; Cuvier, 1829

Species
- See text

= Scyris =

Genus of ray-finned fishes

Scyris is a genus of ray-finned fish in the family Carangidae. Its members were previously included in the genus Alectis.

== Species ==
The currently recognized species in this genus are:

Image	Scientific name	Common name	Distribution
	Scyris alexandrina (Geoffroy Saint-Hilaire, 1817)	African threadfish	tropical eastern Atlantic Ocean, inhabiting the waters of West Africa from Morocco around to Angola
	Scyris indica (Rüppell, 1830)	Indian threadfish	the tropical regions of the Indian and Western Pacific Oceans, ranging from Madagascar, east Africa and the Red Sea to India, China, South East Asia, north to Japan and south to Indonesia and northern Australia
