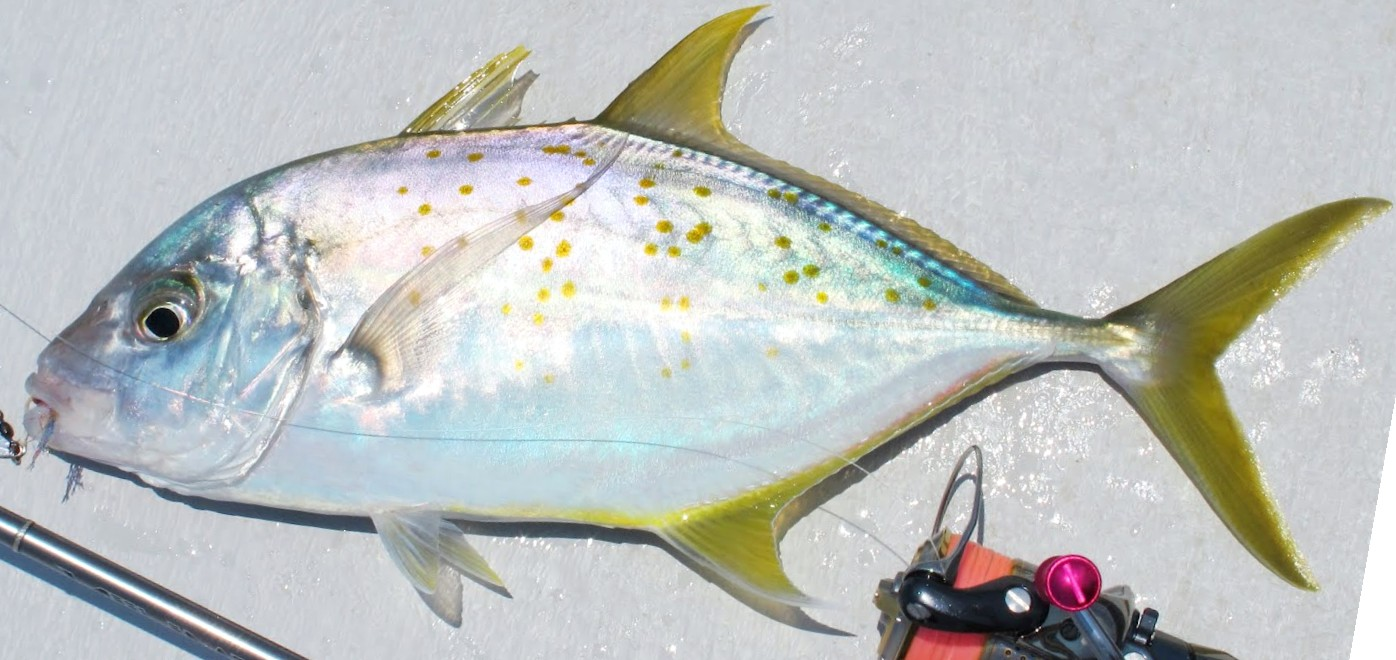
- Turrum fulvoguttatum

Scientific classification
- Kingdom: Animalia
- Phylum: Chordata
- Class: Actinopterygii
- Order: Carangiformes
- Suborder: Carangoidei
- Family: Carangidae
- Subfamily: Caranginae
- Genus: Turrum; Whitley, 1932

Species
- See text

= Turrum =

Genus of ray-finned fishes

Turrum is a genus of ray-finned fish in the family Carangidae. Its members were previously included in the genus Carangoides.

== Species ==
The currently recognized species in this genus are:

Image	Scientific name	Common name	Distribution
	Turrum coeruleopinnatum (Rüppell, 1830)	coastal trevally	the Indian and west Pacific Oceans, from South Africa in the west to Japan and New Caledonia in the east, reaching as far south as Australia.
	Turrum fulvoguttatum (Forsskål, 1775)	goldspotted trevally	western Indo-Pacific region, from South Africa in the west to Japan and Australia in the east.
	Turrum gymnostethus (Cuvier, 1833)	bludger	Indo-west Pacific Ocean, distributed from South Africa in the west to Japan and New Caledonia in the east.
