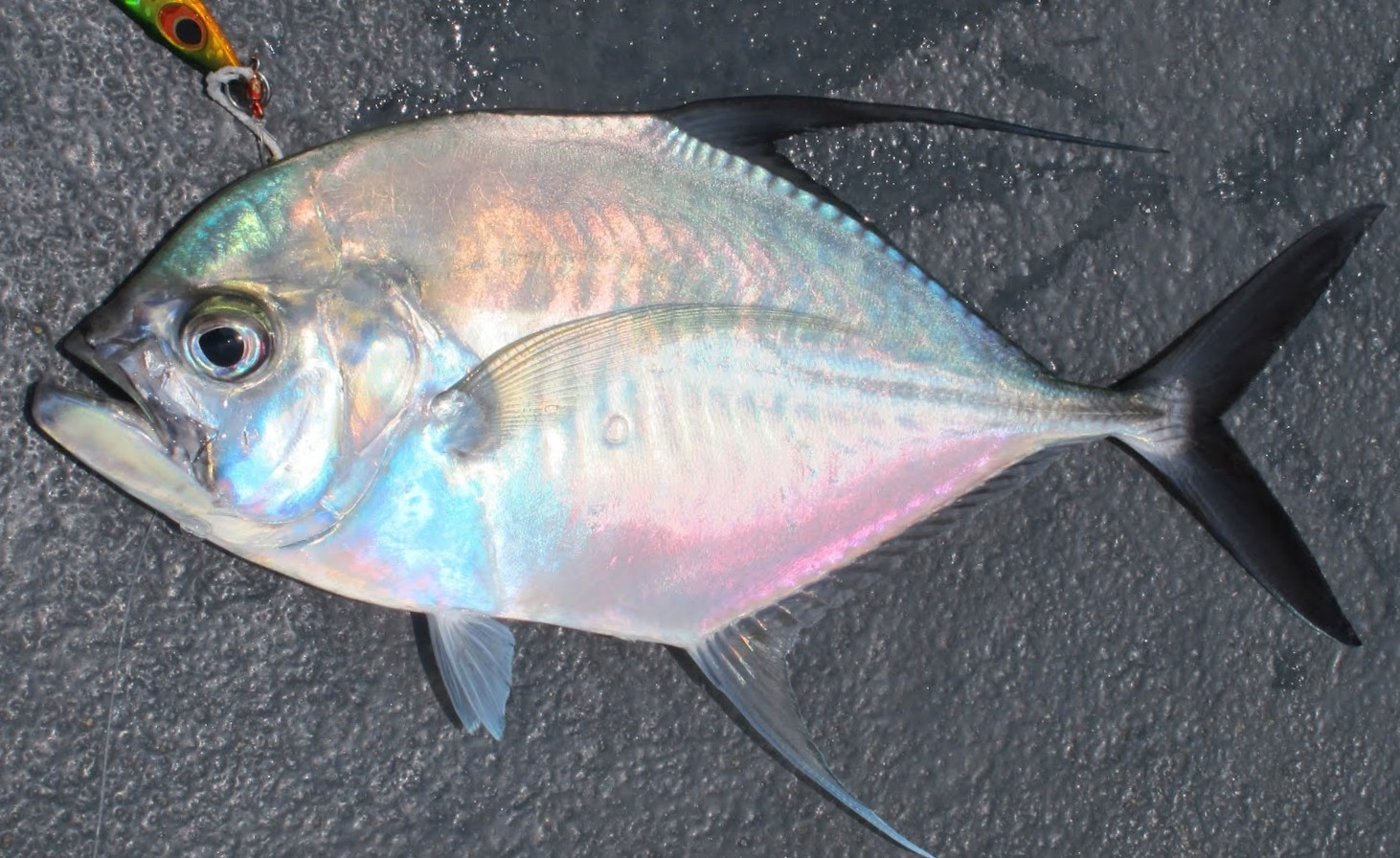

Conservation status
- Least Concern (IUCN 3.1)

Scientific classification
- Kingdom: Animalia
- Phylum: Chordata
- Class: Actinopterygii
- Order: Carangiformes
- Suborder: Carangoidei
- Family: Carangidae
- Genus: Atropus
- Species: A. mentalis

Binomial name
- Atropus mentalis (G. Cuvier, 1833)
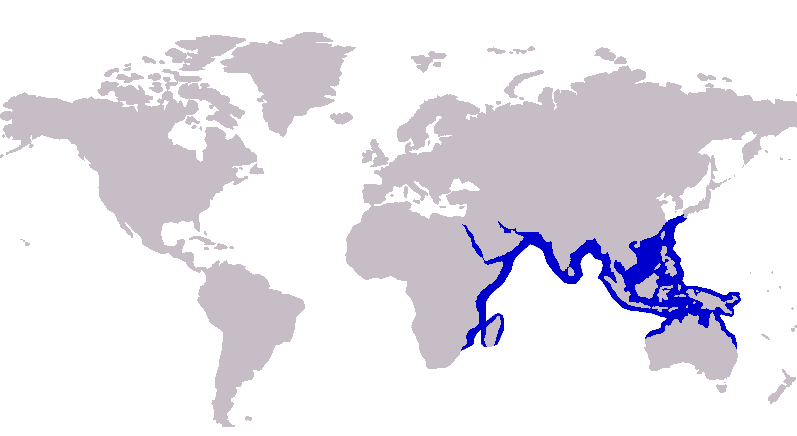
- Approximate range of the longrakered trevally

Synonyms
- Caranx mentalis Cuvier, 1833; Leioglossus carangoides Bleeker, 1851; Caranx lioglossus Günther, 1860; Caranx mandibularis Macleay, 1882; Ulua mandibularis (Macleay, 1882); Ulua mentalis Cuvier, 1833; Ulua richardsoni Jordan & Snyder, 1908

= Longrakered trevally =

Species of fish

The longrakered trevally (Atropus mentalis), also known as the cale cale trevally and heavyjawed kingfish, is a species of marine fish in the jack and horse mackerel family Carangidae. The longrakered trevally is distributed throughout the tropical and subtropical waters of the Indian and west Pacific Oceans, from Mozambique and Madagascar in the west, to Japan and northern Australia in the east. A large species growing to a recorded length of 1 m, the longrakered trevally is distinguished by is protruding lower jaw, elongated gill rakers and lack of villiform teeth on its tongue. It is an inshore species, restricted to coastal and estuarine regions, where it preys on fishes and crustaceans. Little is known of the species reproductive cycle or growth. The longrakered trevally is of minor importance to fisheries and is often taken as bycatch in finfish and prawn trawls, as well as by recreational fishermen.

== Taxonomy and naming ==
The longrakered trevally is one of five species in the genus Atropus, one of around thirty genera in the jack and horse mackerel family Carangidae, which in turn is part of the order Carangiformes.

The longrakered trevally was first scientifically described by the famed French naturalist Georges Cuvier in his 1833 volume Histoire Naturelle des Poissons. Cuvier based his description off the designated holotype specimen collected from the Red Sea near the port city of Massawa in Eritrea. Cuvier named the species Caranx mentalis, with the specific epithet derived from the Latin word for "chin". In 1908 the American ichthyologists David Starr Jordan and John Snyder described Ulua richardsoni and in the process erected a new genus for the species. Subsequent review has shown the designation of a new genus to be correct, however U. richardsoni was found to be synonymous with A. mentalis. ICZN rules state that the first description takes priority, thus the combination of Ulua mentalis was accepted. Finally, the species was placed into Atropus in 2022. Between 1833 and 1908, three other redescriptions were published, with William Macleay's Caranx mandibularis entering common usage before priority was established.

The species is commonly referred to as the 'longrakered trevally' or 'heavyjawed kingfish' in reference to the protruding lower jaw, with the name 'cale cale trevally' also used, predominantly in Australia.

== Description ==
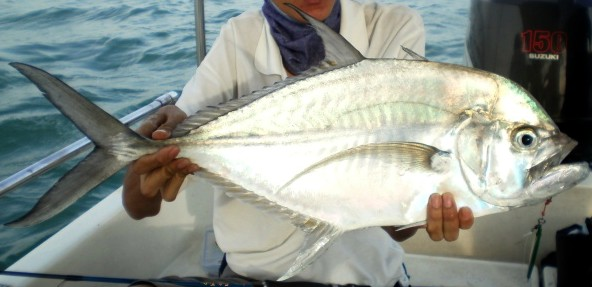
The protruding lower jaw is characteristic of the longrakered trevally

The longrakered trevally is a large fish, reported to reach 1m in length, however is commonly seen at lengths below 60 cm. The longrakered trevally has a body shape typical of many trevallies in the genera Carangoides and Caranx, having a compressed oblong body, with the convexity of the forehead increasing with age. The lower jaw protrudes beyond the upper jaw, giving a pronounced 'chin', which becomes stronger as the fish grows, and is diagnostic of the species. The jaws of the species contain narrow bands of villiform teeth, with no teeth present on the tongue, a feature which distinguishes it from the silvermouth trevally. The gill rakers of the longrakered trevally are also distinctive, being elongated and feather like, extending into the mouth to the tongue. There are 74–86 gill rakers in total. The dorsal fin is in two parts; the first having 7–8 spines and the second 1 spine and 20 to 22 soft rays. The anal fin has 2 detached spines followed by 17 to 18 soft rays. Both the soft dorsal and anal fins are elongated, sometimes to filaments in juveniles, with the dorsal fin being longest and occasionally extending to the caudal fin. The pectoral fins are falcate and extend beyond the intersection of the curved and straight part of the lateral line. The lateral line has a moderate anterior arch, with the straight section containing 0–5 scales followed by 26–38 scutes. The breast area is devoid of scales from the operculum to behind the pelvic fins and extends up to the base of the pectoral fins. There are 24 vertebrae in total.

The longrakered trevally is a blue green to olive green above fading to a silvery white below. A dark diffuse blotch is present on the upper operculum in large individuals, but is faint or absent in smaller fish. The cheeks, lower jaw, inside of the mouth and tongue are all silver in smaller specimens. The spinous dorsal fin is dusky to black, while the soft dorsal and anal fins are dusky to pale green. In larger individuals the lobes of both these fins are dark, however in small specimens the filamentous of the dorsal fin rays are black while the anal fin rays white. The caudal fin is dusky. Juveniles may have 7–8 dark vertical crossbands across their body.

== Distribution and habitat ==
The longrakered trevally is distributed throughout the tropical and subtropical waters of the Indian and West Pacific Oceans. In the Indian Ocean the species ranges from as far south as Mozambique and Madagascar, north to the Red Sea and Persian Gulf and east to India, South East Asia and Indonesia. The species has also been recorded from offshore islands including the Seychelles and Maldives. The species has a restricted range in the west Pacific; in the south it is known from Queensland, Australia, and recently [when?] has been recorded from Japan in the north. The first recorded occurrence of the longrakered trevally in Japan during 2007 was of juveniles, with authors concluding schools had been carried on the Kuroshio Current from China or Taiwan, and the species did not breed in Japan.

The longrakered trevally inhabits shallow coastal waters, and is known to enter estuarine waters as juvenile. In the Persian Gulf, studies found the species to predominately inhabit waters of 30–50 m (100–160 ft) depth.

== Biology and fishery ==
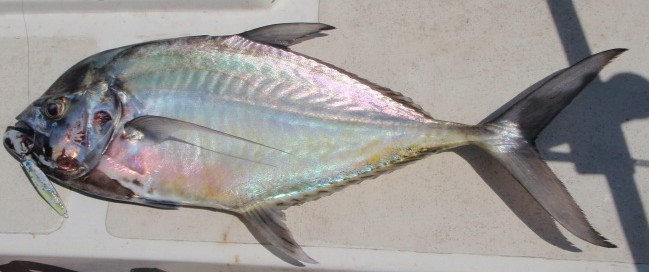
Longrakered trevally are occasionally caught by anglers

The ecology and breeding biology of the longrakered trevally is poorly understood, with only a few studies recording aspects of its feeding. In Mozambique the species was recorded as feeding on crustaceans, while adults also took small fishes as prey. In the Solomon Islands the species is known to predominantly take fish as prey in lagoons, however at times drops fish from its diet. The fine gill rakers on the longrakered trevally have also led to some authors suggesting the possibility of filter feeding on plankton.

The longrakered trevally is of minor importance to fisheries, with catch statistics not kept by the FAO. Throughout its range it is taken with gill nets, trawls traps, handlines, and other types of artisanal gear. For the most part it is taken as bycatch, and has been recorded in Indian finfish catches as well as Australian and Persian Gulf shrimp and prawn trawl fisheries. The abundance of the longrakered trevally in Persian Gulf shrimp catches led to a study of its abundance in the Bandar Charak area of Iran, where in this region alone a biomass of 652 tonnes was estimated. The longrakered trevally is occasionally taken by recreational fishermen by lure or bait methods, however not a common catch. Remains of the species have been found in archeological sites in the UAE, suggesting the longrakered trevally has been exploited throughout prehistory in this region.
