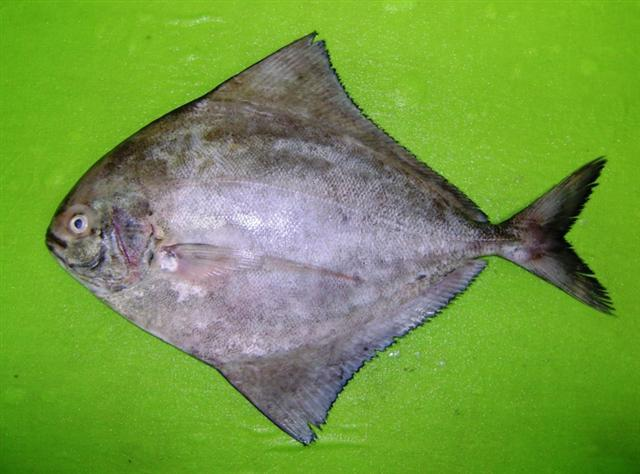

Conservation status
- Least Concern (IUCN 3.1)

Scientific classification
- Kingdom: Animalia
- Phylum: Chordata
- Class: Actinopterygii
- Division: Teleostei
- Order: Carangiformes
- Suborder: Carangoidei
- Family: Carangidae
- Subfamily: Caranginae
- Genus: Parastromateus; Bleeker, 1864
- Species: P. niger

Binomial name
- Parastromateus niger (Bloch, 1795)

= Black pomfret =

Species of fish

The black pomfret (Parastromateus niger) is a species of carangid native to reefs of the Indian Ocean and western Pacific Ocean. This species is very important to local fisheries and is the only known member of its genus. It is not a true pomfret, being a species of jackfish, instead.

== Taxonomy ==
The black pomfret is the only known member of its genus, Parastromateus. The black pomfret was first scientifically described by German-Jewish medical doctor and naturalist, Marcus Elieser Bloch in his encyclopaedia of fish, Allgemeine Naturgeschichte der Fische. The etymology of the name Parastromateus niger is derived form Para meaning to the side of and "Stromateus" meaning a fish flattened body with a lot of colours, in reference to the butterfishes of Stromateus.

== Anatomy ==
The black pomfret has a compressed deep body with dorsal and ventral profiles being equally convex. This species has small dark grey scales which cover the entirety of the body. The fork measurement of black pomfret is commonly 30 cm (12 in) but can also range up to 75 cm (30 in) in length.

The Food and Agriculture Organisation of the United Nations describes the black pomfret as having single row of conical teeth with gill openings unrestricted both laterally and ventrally. The dorsal fins contain four to five short spines which are not apparent in adulthood as well as two more spines on the anal fins which are also not apparent in adulthood. The second dorsal fin and anal fins are almost identical in profile and have broad rounded anterior lobes. Pelvic fins are absent in black pomfret specimens larger than 10 cm (3.9 in) in length. The colour of the adult black pomfret ranges from silvery-grey to bluish brown. They may sometime appear to be of a yellowish-brown colour but that is due to when deciduous scales are missing. The fins of the black pomfret contain dark edges and young specimens have dark vertical bars with long black jugular pelvic fins.

== Habitat ==
The black pomfret is found off the coast of South Africa, Mozambique, Kenya, the Arabian Sea, Bay of Bengal, Persian Gulf, Indonesia, the Philippines, China, southern Japan and Australia. The black pomfret is pelagic and is often found within the depths of 15–40 metres but can also be found at depths of up to 105 metres (340 ft). The black pomfret is found generally on the seafloor during the daytime and at night-time is found at the surface.

== Diet ==
The diet of the black pomfret is rather varied. Steven Dadzie of the Department of Biological Sciences at Kuwait University in his journal article, Food and Feeding Habits of the Black Pomfret, Parastromateus Niger (Carangidae) in the Kuwaiti Waters of the Persian Gulf writes of the food and feeding habits of the black pomfret in the waters surrounding Kuwait. His study concluded, of the 1108 samples the three major dietary components of the black pomfret were: Bacillariophyceae, which accounted for 23% of the diet; fish eggs and larvae, contributing 21% of the diet and crustaceans, accounting for 20% of the diet (Dadzie, 2007). Under the heading of crustaceans, the crustaceans found in the diet of the black pomfret include copepods (77%), followed by brachyuran zoeae (65%), post-larvae of shrimp (29%) and penaeids of shrimp (16%).

== Ecology ==
The black pomfret is susceptible to parasites which cause damage to its growth, diet and overall living. A journal article by P. Vigneshwaran, S. Ravichandran and M. Prema of the Centre of Advanced Study in Marine Biology, Annamalai University in India write of the impact of the parasitic isopod Cymothea eremita on the black pomfret. The study concludes that the parasite Cymothea eremita could be related to the health status of the black pomfret, affecting its growth and decreased feeding efficiency, which greatly affect the survival of the black pomfret.

A further defect found in black pomfret fish is saddleback syndrome. Saddleback syndrome is a deformity in the dorsal fin of the fish but the cause of the syndrome is unknown. Studies suggest that the deformity is caused by pollution, nutritional deficiency or genetic mutation. Further research and study has to be done however to locate the real cause of saddleback syndrome.

== Reproduction ==
The reproduction of the black pomfret is rather unknown, as is its lifespan. Studies show that the black pomfret can live up to 7 years, but the maximum lifespan of the black pomfret is undetermined. Further studies need to be done in order to determine the maximum age of the black pomfret as well as the reproduction.

== Human uses ==
Global capture production of Black pomfret (Parastromateus niger) in thousand tonnes from 1950 to 2022, as reported by the FAO

The black pomfret has a slight 'fishy' flavour, is slightly oily and has few bones. It is recommended for cooking to be steamed, poached, deep fried, pan fried, grilled, smoked, barbecued, pickled or served raw. The black pomfret is a highly sought after fish in Asia, where 74,607 tonnes of black pomfret were caught in 2016.
