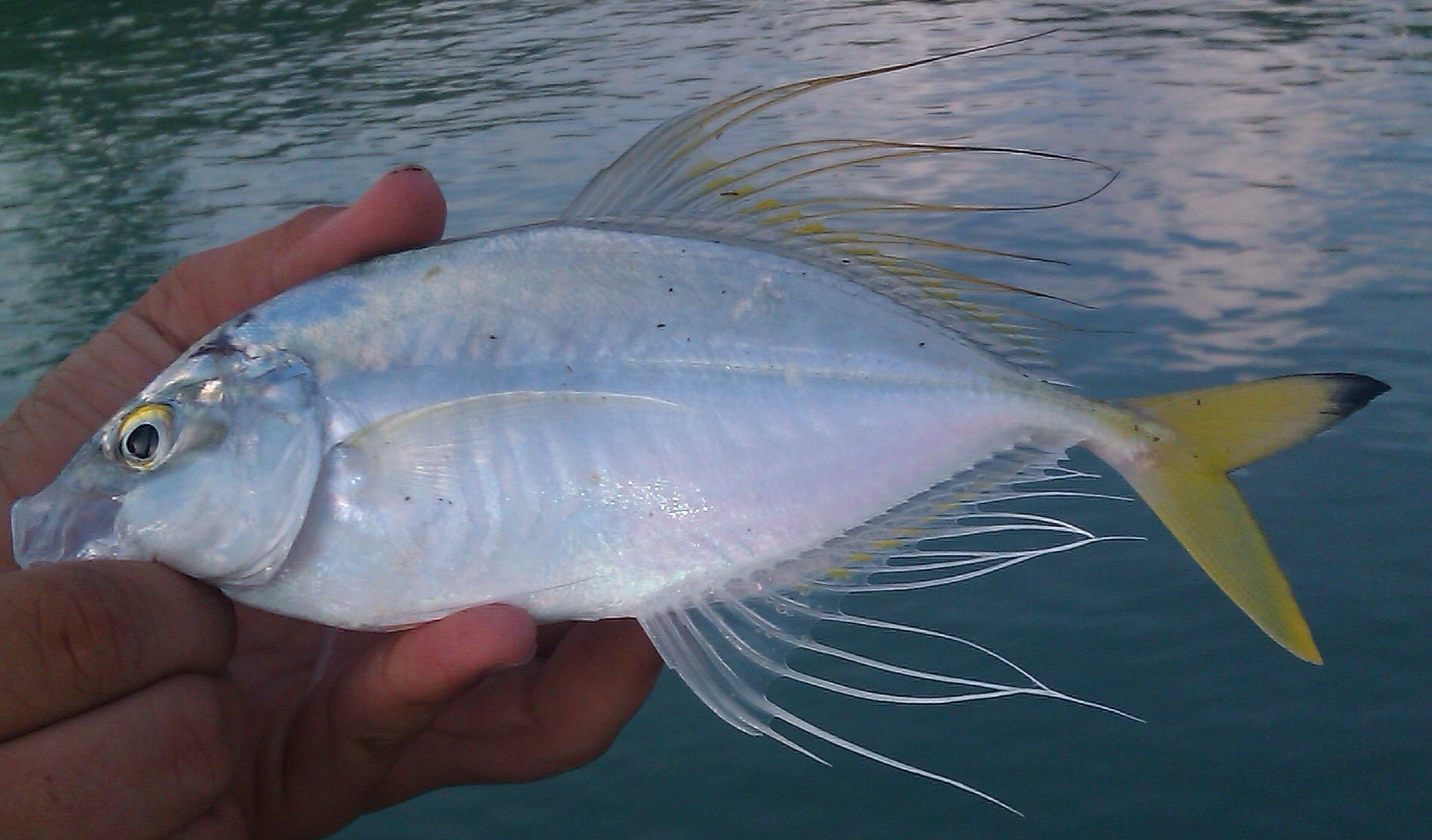

Conservation status
- Least Concern (IUCN 3.1)

Scientific classification
- Kingdom: Animalia
- Phylum: Chordata
- Class: Actinopterygii
- Order: Carangiformes
- Suborder: Carangoidei
- Family: Carangidae
- Subfamily: Caranginae
- Genus: Pantolabus; Whitley, 1931
- Species: P. radiatus

Binomial name
- Pantolabus radiatus (W. J. Macleay, 1881)
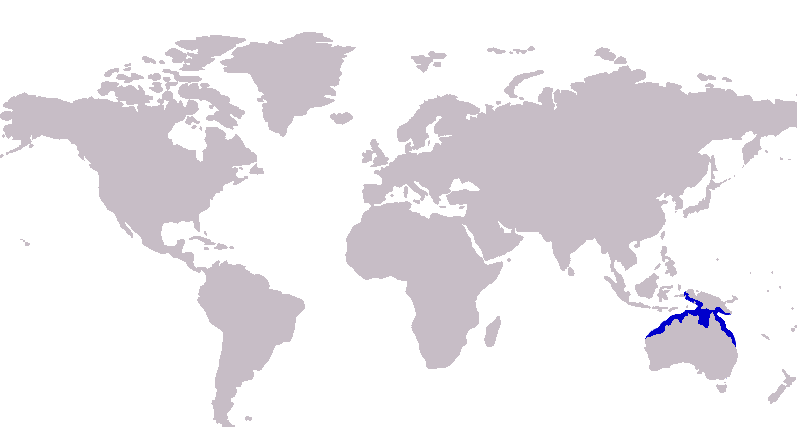
- Approximate range of the fringefin trevally

Synonyms
- Caranx radiatus Macleay, 1881; Absalom radiatus (Macleay, 1881); Caranx compressus Macleay, 1883; Caranx parasitus Garman, 1903

= Fringefin trevally =

Species of fish

The fringefin trevally (Pantolabus radiatus), also called fringe-finned trevally, round-finned trevally or reef herring, is a species of inshore marine fish classified in the jack and horse mackerel family Carangidae. A relatively small fish, the fringefin trevally is known to reach 40 cm (16 in), but is mostly encountered at lengths less than 25 cm (9.8 in). The fringefin trevally has an ovate body, with distinctive orange-yellow fins and a black opercular spot. The dental patterns of the species distinguish it from the closely related scads of the genus Alepes. Males have characteristic elongated dorsal and anal fins which produce a series of trailing filaments. The fringefin trevally is restricted to the waters of the Indo-Pacific, ranging from northern Australia to Papua New Guinea and eastern Indonesia. An inshore species, it is found in coastal and estuarine environments and exhibits daily and seasonal movements. The fringefin trevally is predatory, taking crustaceans as prey. The species is often taken as bycatch in prawn trawls and occasionally taken by anglers.

== Taxonomy and naming ==
The fringefin trevally is the only member of the monotypic genus Pantolabus, one of around 30 genera in the jack and horse mackerel family Carangidae, which in turn is part of the order Carangiformes.

The fringefin trevally was scientifically described by the Australian naturalist William Macleay in 1881 based on the holotype specimen taken in Rockingham Bay of Queensland, Australia. He named the species Caranx radiatus, with the specific epithet derived from the Latin word for 'radiating' in reference to the elongated fin filaments. Two years later in 1883, Macleay unknowingly redescribed the same species as Caranx compressus, again from a Queensland-caught specimen. The American ichthyologist Samuel Garman also redescribed the species as Caranx parasitus in 1903. These later names are considered junior synonyms under ICZN rules and considered invalid. The current generic name arose after the Australian ichthyologist Gilbert Whitley examined Garman's Caranx parasitus and concluded it warranted placement in a separate genus with close affinity to the genus Alepes. He named the genus Pantolabus; in his description he gives no explanation of the etymology, but it likely is derived from a Latin name for men, most notably the character of the same name in Horace's Satires. In 1937, Whitley also revised Caranx radiatus, placing it a separate new genus; Absalom. Further revisions recognised the priority of Caranx radiatus as the first description and agreed with the placement in a monotypic genus. Since Whitley's Pantolabus came first, it had priority, creating the currently accepted name of Pantolabus radiatus.

The species is commonly referred to as the fringefin or fringe-finned trevally in reference to the elongated dorsal and anal fin lobes. Other less commonly used names include round-finned trevally and reef herring.

The fringefin trevally was included in a phylogenetic study based upon morphological characteristics by Soko Gushiken. This found the species to be most closely related to the scad genus Alepes, included in a larger monophyletic grouping of scads and horse mackerels as part of the subfamily Caranginae.

== Description ==
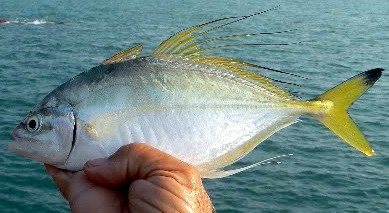
The male fringefin trevally has elongated dorsal and anal fin rays

The fringefin trevally is a relatively small species of carangid: reaching a maximum recorded length of 40 cm (16 in), it is more commonly encountered at lengths less than 25 cm. The species has an oval-shaped body with the dorsal and ventral profiles equally convex. The fringefin trevally's dentition is one of the features that allows it to be distinguished from the scads of the genus Alepes, having a single row of moderately enlarged, conical teeth on the lower jaw and an outer row of conical teeth on the upper jaw bordered by inner bands of small, but not villiform, sharply pointed teeth. A well developed adipose eyelid is present on the posterior half of the eye, similar to the members of Alepes. The dorsal fin is in two parts; the first having eight spines and the second one spine and 20 to 26 soft rays. The anal fin has two detached spines followed by 18 to 20 soft rays. The males of the species have all their soft dorsal and anal fins extended into distinctive filaments, with the longest filaments at the front of the second dorsal fin. The second dorsal and anal fins of both sexes have a scaly basal sheath. The lateral line has a moderate anterior arch, with 33 to 41 scales in the curved section and no to 9 scales and 38 to 49 scutes on the straight section. It has 36 to 41 gill rakers in total and 24 vertebrae.

The fringefin trevally is an olive-green to bluish-green colour above, grading to a silvery-white below. A large black spot about the same size as the eye is present on the operculum. The dorsal, anal, and caudal fins are all a distinctive orange-yellow colour, with the caudal fin having also having a black upper lobe. The pectoral fins are pale orange to hyaline and the pelvic fins are white.

== Distribution and habitat ==
The fringefin trevally is distributed through a small area of the Indo-Pacific, ranging from northern Australia to Papua New Guinea and West Papua in Indonesia. Around Australia, the species is known from Port Hedland in Western Australian around to Gladstone in Queensland.

The fringefin trevally is predominantly an inshore species, rarely found in waters greater than 30 m deep. The species commonly enters estuaries, but is restricted to the lower reaches of these environments. Studies in northern Australia suggest the species prefer turbid waters, with trawl catches increasing in more turbid waters. Fringefin trevally have also been recorded over seagrass habitats.

== Biology and fishery ==
Little is known of the fringefin trevally, with only a handful of studies in northern Australia recording aspects of its ecology. These focused predominantly on abundance, movements, and habitats of a variety of species. The species was found to be more abundant in trawl catches during the night and on neap tides. On a longer-term scale, the fringefin trevally was present in the Gulf of Carpentaria study area from January to August before moving out of the catch area. The species does not appear to change habitat with age, with individuals of various stages of their lives found in estuarine, inshore, and shelf environments. The fringefin trevally is a predator, feeding on epibenthic crustaceans.

The fringefin trevally is not a commercially targeted species, but still makes up a small percentage of the northern Australian prawn trawls. They are occasionally taken by anglers on bait or small lures and considered to be mediocre table fish.
