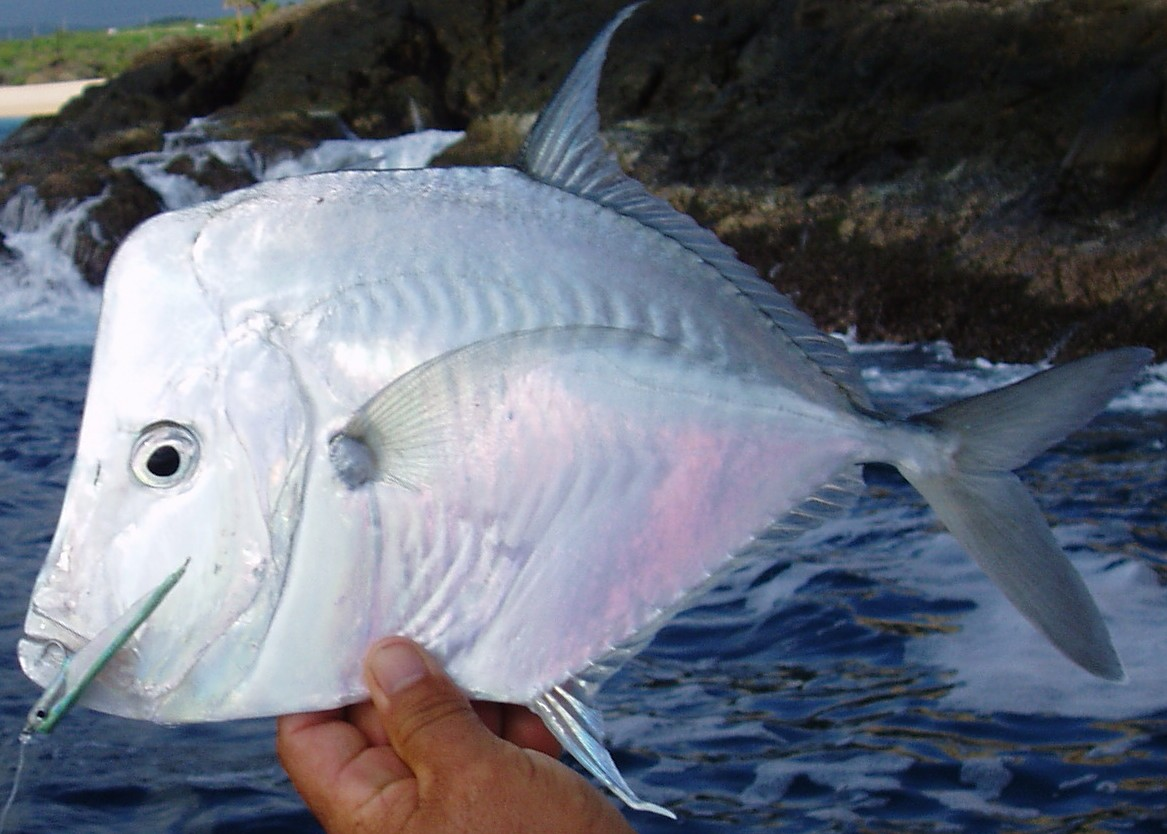

Conservation status
- Least Concern (IUCN 3.1)

Scientific classification
- Kingdom: Animalia
- Phylum: Chordata
- Class: Actinopterygii
- Order: Carangiformes
- Suborder: Carangoidei
- Family: Carangidae
- Genus: Paraselene; Kimura et al., 2022
- Species: P. orstedii

Binomial name
- Paraselene orstedii (Lütken, 1880)

Synonyms
- Selene orstedii Lütken, 1880; Selene oerstedi Lütken, 1880; Selene oerstedii Lütken, 1880; Vomer oerstedii (Lütken, 1880); Vomer orstedii (Lütken, 1880)

= Mexican moonfish =

Species of ray-finned fish

The Mexican moonfish (Paraselene orstedii) is a species of ray-finned fish within the family Carangidae. It is the only species within the genus Paraselene. The Mexican moonfish is found in the eastern Pacific Ocean, off the coasts of Baja California, Mexico to Ecuador. It grows to a maximum length of 33 cm (13 in), but is more commonly found at 25 centimetres (9.8 in) in length. Adults are found in shallow coastal waters at depths up to 50 metres (160 ft), usually near the seafloor. Its diet consists of squid, small crabs, small fishes and polychaetes.

== Conservation ==
The Mexican moonfish currently has no known major threats, although it is often caught in artisanal fisheries through the use of gill nets, and is an important species of commercial fish in the Gulf of Montijo, Panama. There are currently no specific conservation efforts for the species, and its distribution already overlaps with marine protected areas within the eastern Pacific. It has been classified as a 'Least concern' species by the IUCN Red List.
