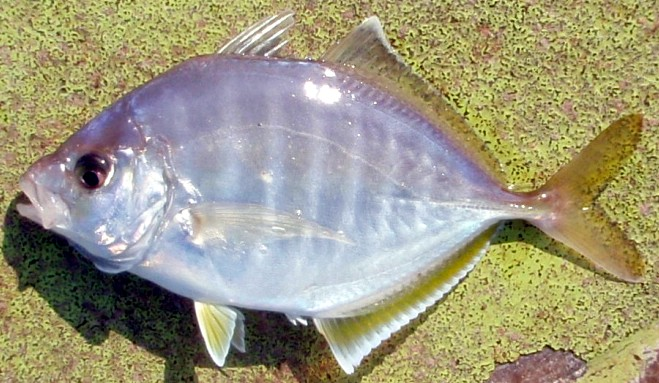

Conservation status
- Least Concern (IUCN 3.1)

Scientific classification
- Kingdom: Animalia
- Phylum: Chordata
- Class: Actinopterygii
- Division: Teleostei
- Order: Carangiformes
- Suborder: Carangoidei
- Family: Carangidae
- Genus: Kaiwarinus; Suzuki, 1962
- Species: K. equula

Binomial name
- Kaiwarinus equula (Temminck & Schlegel, 1844)
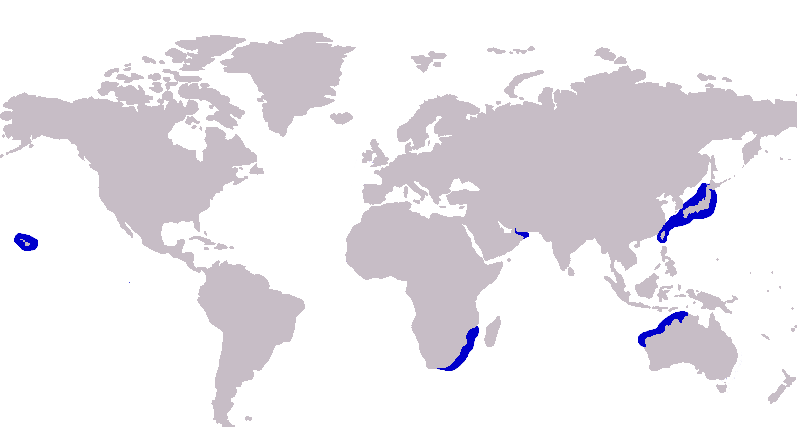
- Known range of the whitefin trevally

Synonyms
- Caranx equula Temminck & Schlegel, 1844; Carangoides equula (Temminck & Schlegel, 1844); Caranx dasson Jordan & Snyder, 1907; Carangoides acutus Kotthaus, 1974

= Whitefin trevally =

Species of fish

The whitefin trevally (Kaiwarinus equula), also known as the horse trevally, is a species of deep water offshore fish in the jack family Carangidae. The species inhabits the tropical to temperate waters of the Indo-Pacific and central Pacific, ranging from South Africa in the west to Hawaii in the east. The whitefin trevally is a moderate-sized fish, growing to 37 cm (15 in), and is distinguished by a number of morphological traits, including fin size, gill raker count, and colour. It inhabits the continental shelf and slope at depths to 200 m (660 ft) over sand and mud substrates, where it preys on fish, crustaceans, and cephalopods. Studies in Japan indicate a length at sexual maturity of 17.4 cm (6.9 in) on average, with spawning occurring between May and October, with each individual spawning multiple times. Whitefin trevallies are of high importance to fisheries in Japan, where they are taken by trawlers, although the catch numbers have halved since the 1980s. It is of minor importance elsewhere throughout its range, but is considered a good table fish.

== Taxonomy and naming ==
Before being a monospecific genus, the whitefin trevally is classified within the genus Carangoides, a group of fish commonly known as jacks and trevallies. Carangoides falls into the jack and horse mackerel family Carangidae, the Carangidae are part of the order Carangiformes.

The species was first scientifically described by Dutch naturalists Coenraad Jacob Temminck and Hermann Schlegel in 1844 based on a specimen taken from the waters off Japan, which was designated to be the holotype. They named the species Caranx equula, although the species was later moved to Carangoides, as well as having a new genus created for it, Kaiwarinus. This genus was considered invalid, though a 1988 review of the phylogeny of the Carangidae found it to be valid, and to be the sister genus to Pseudocaranx, not closely related to Carangoides. The species was independently renamed as Carangoides acutus in 1974, but this is rejected as a junior synonym under ICZN nomenclature rules.

Specimens taken from Hawaii and Easter Island in the Pacific Ocean initially had the name Caranx (Carangoides) dasson applied to them by the American ichthyologists Jordan and Snyder. This name was eventually synonymised with Carangoides equula, but uncertainty still remains whether this population actually represents a separate species or subspecies. The Carangoides dasson population has the same diagnostic features as Carangoides equula, but exhibit more slender bodies and larger eyes, with William Smith-Vaniz indicating more research is required to determine the relationship between these populations. The name Caranx (Carangoides) dasson is still currently considered to be invalid by taxonomic authorities.

== Description ==
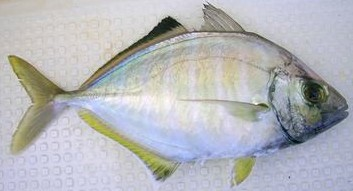
The whitefin trevally has a deep, almost rhomboid-shaped body

The whitefin trevally is a relatively small fish, reaching a maximum known length of 37.5 cm. The species has a body shape similar to a number of other jacks, having a compressed, almost rhomboidal body, with the dorsal and ventral profiles approximately equally convex. The dorsal profiles of the snout and nape in the species are almost straight. Two separate dorsal fins are seen, with the first having seven spines, while the second consists of one spine and 23 to 25 soft rays. The first dorsal fin is moderately high, with the longest spine about as high as the soft dorsal-fin lobe is long, and is quite distinctive of the species. The anal fin consists of two anteriorly detached spines followed by one spine and 21 to 24 soft rays, with the pelvic fin having one spine and 18 or 19 soft rays. The lateral line has a moderately strong anterior arch with the junction of the curved and straight sections occurring vertically below the twelfth to fifteenth soft rays of the second dorsal fin. The curved segment of the lateral line is longer than the straight section, which contains no to six scales followed by 22 to 32 scutes. The breast is entirely scaled, or has a very small naked area anteroventrally. Both jaws contain narrow bands of small teeth, with the outer teeth slightly larger. It has 27 to 32 gill rakers in total and 24 vertebrae.

The whitefin trevally is silver, with a blue to green dorsal surface, becoming silvery white below. The soft dorsal and anal fins are dusky yellow basally, with the anterior rays of both having dark grey-brown median and white distal bands. The caudal fin is dusky yellow, while the pectoral and pelvic fins are white. Juveniles have between 5 and 7 dark bands vertically on their sides.

== Distribution and habitat ==
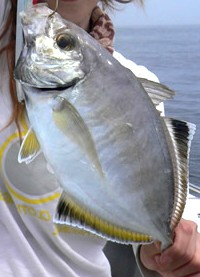
The whitefin trevally is occasionally taken by anglers

The whitefin trevally is distributed throughout the tropical and temperate waters of the Indo-Pacific region, although in a very patchily recorded distribution. In the western Indian Ocean, the species has only been recorded from South Africa, Somalia, and in the Gulf of Oman. In the eastern Indian Ocean, the species is known from northwestern Australia, and definitely extends its distribution into the Pacific as far as Okinawa. If Carangoides dasson is synonymous with Kaiwarinus equula, this extends the species distribution well into the Pacific, ranging to Hawaii and Easter Island. Before the species was recorded in Australia in 1988, the whitefin trevally was thought to only have an antitropical distribution. The fish probably has a more continuous distribution than currently known, with lack of adequate sampling contributing its patchily known distribution.

The whitefin trevally is thought to primarily inhabit deep waters on the continental shelf and slope between 90 and 200 m (300 and 660 ft) deep over sandy and muddy substrates. At least one record exists of the species in shallow inshore waters, where an individual was captured off a sandy beach on Japan, but was thought to be stray fish. Two specimens were caught at the entrance of Durban Harbour, South Africa in December 2022, indicating that shoals travel into inshore waters of up to 20 metres (66 ft).

== Biology ==
The whitefin trevally is a benthic predator, taking a variety of small fish, crustaceans, and cephalopods, either by foraging or chasing down its prey using its eyes which are extremely well adapted to the deep, low-light waters. Along with the white trevally, Pseudocaranx dentex, it is the only member of the Carangidae to have the anatomy of its eyes examined, with the study finding excellent dark-environment sight due to the presence of a tapetum.

The maturation and reproduction of the whitefin trevally have been extensively studied off Japan due to the species' economic importance in this region. Sexual maturity is reached at a minimum length of 15.1 cm (5.9 in), although most individuals reach maturity at around 17.4 cm (6.9 in) length and every individual is mature by 24 cm (9.4 in). Although these parameters were calculated for female fish, observational data suggest the male life history is similar. In Japan, the species has a prolonged spawning season, from May to October, during which females spawn repeatedly, releasing between 13,862 and 79,899 eggs per batch. The growth of males and females is very similar, and both have similar lifespans. A length of 7.5 cm (3.0 in) is reached after the first year, and lengths of 12.3 cm (4.8 in), 16.0 cm (6.3 in) and 18.8 cm (7.4 in) after the second, third and fourth years, respectively.

== Relationship to humans ==
The whitefin trevally is a commercially important species in the waters off Japan, where it is known as kaiwari (カイワリ), and of minor importance elsewhere throughout its range. For unknown reasons, the Japanese catch has decreased by half since the mid-1980s. It is taken primarily by bottom trawls on the continental shelf and considered to be a good table fish.
