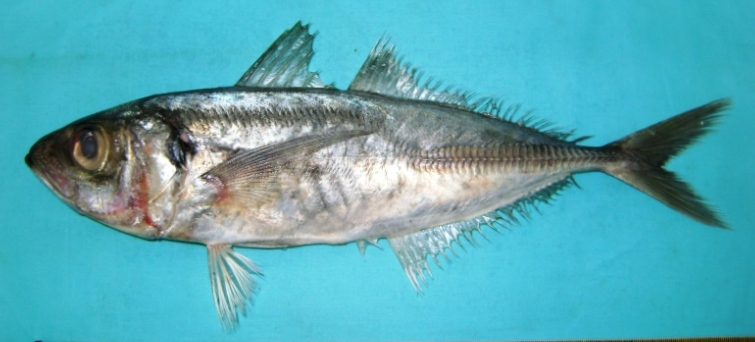

Conservation status
- Vulnerable (IUCN 3.1)

Scientific classification
- Kingdom: Animalia
- Phylum: Chordata
- Class: Actinopterygii
- Order: Carangiformes
- Suborder: Carangoidei
- Family: Carangidae
- Genus: Trachurus
- Species: T. indicus

Binomial name
- Trachurus indicus Nekrasov, 1966

= Arabian scad =

Species of fish

The Arabian scad (Trachurus indicus) is a species of jack mackerel from the family Carangidae which is found in the Western Indian Ocean.

== Description ==
The Arabian scad has an elongate and slightly compressed body with the upper and lower profiles being roughly equal. The eye is moderately large and has a well-developed adipose eyelid which normally covers almost all of the eye apart from a vertical oval with the pupil in the centre. It has a reasonably wide upper jaw which extends to underneath the forward anterior edge of the eye. The mouth is equipped with small teeth, having a single row in each jaw. It has two separate dorsal fins, the first having 8 spines with the second having a single spine and 28 to 35 soft rays. The anal fin has 2 detached spines to its front followed by a single spine and 24 to 30 soft rays. The pectoral fins are as long or longer than the length of the head. The scales in the lateral line and large and form scutes. It has a black spot on the upper margin of the operculum and the upper part of the body is dark dusky to almost black or greenish to bluish while the flanks and belly are silvery to white. The fins are not coloured It grows to a maximum total length of 35 centimetres (14 in).

== Distribution ==
The Arabian scad is found in the western Indian Ocean from the Red Sea and Somalia through the Persian Gulf east as far as Pakistan and south to the Saya de Malha Bank. The species was reported for the first time in the Mediterranean Sea in 2004 off Turkey.

== Habitat and biology ==
The Arabian scad is a semi-pelagic, demersal fish which forms schools in nearshore waters at depths between 20–250 metres (66–820 ft), but mostly frequently recorded in waters of less than 100 metres (330 ft) depth. It apparently is not recorded where the water temperature is below 20 °C (68 °F) or where the saturation level of oxygen is less than 30%. Sexual maturity is reached in the fish's first year of life when it attains a length of 11 centimetres (4.3 in). In the seas off Oman, however, sexual maturity was attained at about 16.3 centimetres (6.4 in) in total length for males and 17.4 centimetres (6.9 in) for females. Spawning takes place in the Gulf of Oman from August to November, peaking during September and October. They reach is at least seven years of age and the estimated generation length is three and a half years. Its diet consists largely of fish fry and small crustaceans.

== Fisheries ==
The Arabian scad is caught as bycatch in some fisheries and is often discarded due to its low market value. It, and two congeneric species, are targeted by purse seine fisheries in the Gulf of Suez, while in Somalia it is targeted by subsistence and artisanal fisheries.

== Taxonomy ==
Trachurus indicus was described in 1966 by the Soviet ichthyologist V.V. Nekrasov as the subspecies indicus of Trachurus mediterraneus with the type locality given as the Gulf of Aden. It is now considered a valid species.
