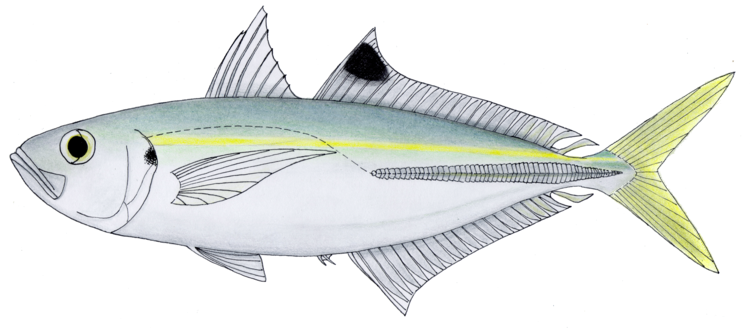

Conservation status
- Least Concern (IUCN 3.1)

Scientific classification
- Kingdom: Animalia
- Phylum: Chordata
- Class: Actinopterygii
- Order: Carangiformes
- Suborder: Carangoidei
- Family: Carangidae
- Genus: Caranx
- Species: C. rhonchus

Binomial name
- Caranx rhonchus É. Geoffroy Saint-Hilaire, 1817
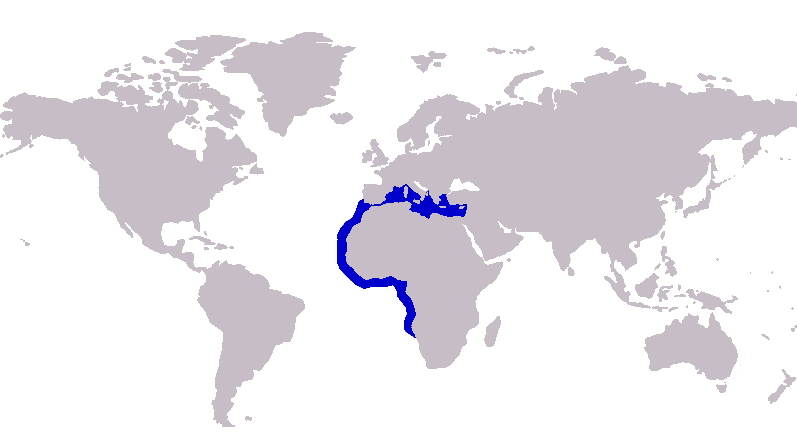
- Approximate range of the false scad

Synonyms
- Decapterus rhonchus (Geoffroy Saint-Hilaire, 1817); Caranx angolensis Fowler, 1919; Decapterus angolensis (Fowler, 1919)

= False scad =

Species of fish

The false scad (Caranx rhonchus), also known as the spotfin scad, ten-finned horse mackerel and yellow horse mackerel, is a species of medium-sized marine fish classified in the jack family Carangidae. The false scad is distributed throughout the tropical and temperate waters of the eastern Atlantic Ocean from Namibia in the south to Spain and throughout most of the Mediterranean in the north. The species has an atypical body form compared to other species of Caranx, and can be distinguished from these on its elongate 'scad-like' body shape alone. Distinguishing the species from members of Decapterus and Trachurus is more difficult, requiring detailed anatomical analysis. The false scad is known to grow to a length of 60 cm and a weight of 1 kg. The species lives both pelagically and demersally in continental shelf waters, ranging from depths of 15 to 200 m. It is a predatory fish, taking small fishes, crustaceans including euphausiids and shrimps, and cephalopods as its main prey, with significant dietary shifts as it ages. The false scad reaches sexual maturity at 2 years of age, with spawning occurring between April and July in shallow inshore waters, where the juveniles remain. The species is of major importance to fisheries throughout its range, but particularly from Morocco to Senegal, with annual catches ranging from 500 to 19000 t. The species is caught using trawls, seine nets and gill nets and sold fresh, frozen or salted.

== Taxonomy and naming ==
The false scad is classified within the genus Caranx, one of a number of groups known as the jacks or trevallies. Caranx itself is part of the larger jack and horse mackerel family Carangidae, which in turn is part of the order Carangiformes.

The species was first scientifically described by the French naturalist Étienne Geoffroy Saint-Hilaire in 1817 based on a specimen from Alexandria, Egypt which was designated to be the holotype. He named the species Caranx rhonchus, with the specific epithet of Latin origin meaning 'snorting' or 'croaking', in reference to the sound the species often makes when pulled from the water. The species placement in Caranx was later revised to Decapterus, although the revision was not accepted by all authors with the generic status of the species undetermined for many years. It has now been accepted by most taxonomic authorities, that despite the species appearance, the false scad shares more anatomical features with Caranx than Decapterus. The species was independently renamed once by Henry Weed Fowler in 1919 under the name of Caranx angolensis, which was similarly shifted to Decapterus before synonymy was recognized and the name sunk into C. rhonchus. The common name of 'false scad' refers to the scad like appearance of the fish, despite it not being a member of Decapterus or Trachurus, the two genera most commonly referred to as 'scads'. Other lesser used names for the species include spotfin scad, ten-finned horse mackerel and yellow horse mackerel.

=== Phylogeny ===
Despite being classified in Caranx based on anatomical features, the generic affinities of the false scad have been questioned after a molecular phylogeny of the Carangidae was published. Using mitochondrial cytochrome b sequences, the species (which was labelled Decapterus rhoncus) was found to be strongly related to another member of Decapterus, as well as members of Trachurus, with no close relationships with genus Caranx. The species did place within the same subfamily (or tribe) as Caranx; Carangini. A study of the pterygiophore insertion patterns in the Carangidae also came to the conclusion it should not be placed in Caranx; nor any other currently recognised genus. It was recommended that it be placed in a new genus, however the authors delayed any such action pending publication of a current study into carangid relationships.

== Description ==
The false scad is a moderately large species, growing to a known maximum length of 60 cm and a weight of 1 kg, although is more common at lengths of around 35 cm. The species has a much different body profile to most other species of Caranx, possessing an elongate, slightly compressed body in place of the deep, oblong shaped forms of its larger relatives. The species dorsal profile is approximately as equally convex as the ventral profile. The dorsal fin is in two distinct parts, the first consisting of 8 spines while the second has 1 spine and 28 to 32 soft rays. The anal fin consists of 2 detached spines anteriorly, followed by 1 spine and 25 to 28 soft rays. The soft rays located at the end of both the dorsal and anal fins are detached and only connected by a basal interradial membrane, forming a partially detached finlet. The pectoral and pelvic fins are both short. The species lateral line is weakly arched anteriorly, becoming straight after the end of the dorsal fin lobe. The curved section has 45 to 55 scales present and 0 to 3 scutes, while the straight section contains 0 to 8 scales and 24 to 32 scutes. The shoulder girdle is smooth, lacking papillae. The false scad has a well-developed adipose eyelid, particularly posteriorly, with both the jaws containing irregular narrow bands of fine teeth. The species has 50 to 58 gill rakers and 24 vertebrae.

The false scad is a blueish green to olive green-brown above fading to silvery white below, often with a narrow yellow stripe running from the head to the base of the caudal fin. The fins are hyaline to dusky with the exception of the caudal fin which is yellow. The second dorsal fin's lobe has a black blotch and narrow pale border at the tip. A black blotch is also present on the operculum.

== Distribution and habitat ==
The false scad is distributed throughout the tropical and temperate waters of the eastern Atlantic Ocean, although the species is more abundant in certain regions of its range. The species has been reported from as far south as Namibia, but southern Angola appears to be the furthest south the species normally ventures. It is distributed north along the west African coastline, reaching as far north as Spain in Europe, with its range also extending well into the Mediterranean Sea. Here it is known as far east as Turkey, Egypt and Israel and as far north as Italy, Greece and Albania.

The false scad lives both pelagically, free swimming high in the water column, as well as demersally, hugging the bottom strata. It prefers sandy or muddy substrates over continental shelf environments, ranging in depths from 15 m to 200 m. Juveniles tend to inhabit shallower inshore waters including estuaries, lagoons, beaches and marshes.

== Biology ==
The false scad is a schooling species, forming large protective masses, often mingling with other semi-pelagic fishes. Like other carangid species, the species is often attracted to human-made fish attracting devices, which are floating buoys used to attract fish for research or angling purposes. The species has had several extensive studies performed on it, due to its high importance in some Atlantic and Mediterranean fisheries.

=== Diet and feeding ===
It is a predatory species, with several studies conducted to determine its diet and feeding habits. A study in the Cape Blanc region found Branchiostoma lanceolatum (a cephalochordate), euphausiids, small fish and other small crustaceans were the predominantly taken food items, with a surprising absence of copepods which other small species included in the study did take. This lack of copepods in the false scad's diet was also noticed in an earlier similar study, which looked at the diet of slightly smaller fish. A much later study in the same location found similar results, with fish being the most common prey followed by crustaceans including shrimps and mysids, molluscs and annelids. There is a change in the diet of the species as it grows, with one study finding 23 to 30 cm long fish took Branchiostoma lanceolatum predominantly, 30 to 35 cm fish took euphausiids and mysids, while 35 to 55 cm fish consumed small fishes of the families Maurolicidae and Carangidae predominantly. A similar pattern has been seen in other studies, with a general pattern of decreasing amounts of crustaceans and increasing amounts of small fish consumed as the fish grows. Seasonal variation in prey items is also known, with crustaceans dominating the diet during autumn and winter, while small fish are more frequently taken in summer. The feeding intensity of the species is lowest during the winter months, with the species feeding predominantly around mid day, and not at all during the night.

=== Reproduction and growth ===
The false scad reaches sexual maturity during its second year of life at a length of around 20 cm in both sexes. The timing of spawning appears to vary slightly between locations, with a study in the Mediterranean indicating a period from June to August, while a study off Senegal found the period to be more protracted, occurring from April to November. Spawning occurs in shallow inshore waters, with the event occurring at an optimum water temperatures of 18.7 degrees Celsius. Studies on females between 29 and 35 cm in length found each fish releases between 480,000 and 990,000 eggs, with the species a partial spawner, in which a proportion of the mature oocytes are not released from the ovary and are instead reabsorbed by the female. Larvae and juveniles remain in the shallow water environment, with growth quite rapid in the species. The newly hatched fish will reach a length of 12.2 cm at age one year, 17.9 cm at two, 22.3 cm at three, and 29.7 at the age of five years.

== Relationship to humans ==
The false scad is of major importance to commercial fisheries throughout its range, with fisheries off Morocco, Senegal and in the Mediterranean taking the highest numbers of fish. They are fished for primarily with trawls, purse seines and gill nets; although juveniles occasionally turn up inshore nets such as beach seines. The species is part of a number of fish that live a similar semi-pelagic lifestyle that make up what is often referred to as a 'small pelagics fishery'. Some of these are the similar Trachurus species, and due to these also being present in the catch, Caranx rhonchus is often not differentiated, leading to lower than accurate catch statistics. Furthermore, vendors are known to fraudulently market C. rhonchus as 'horse mackerel', which is strictly applied to members of Trachurus. FAO catch statistics indicate a current annual catch of between 1500 and 3700 tonnes per year from both Africa and Europe between 2002 and 2007. Older catch data indicates much more was taken between 1979 and 1992, with these years having catches between 4000 and 19000 tonnes. The species is sold fresh, frozen, smoked, salted, dried and is used for fish meal and oil. The IGFA all tackle world record for the species stands at 0.56 kg (1 lb 3oz) caught off Portugal in 2007.
