= Cunene horse mackerel =

Conservation status
- Least Concern (IUCN 3.1)

Scientific classification
- Kingdom: Animalia
- Phylum: Chordata
- Class: Actinopterygii
- Order: Carangiformes
- Suborder: Carangoidei
- Family: Carangidae
- Genus: Trachurus
- Species: T. trecae

Binomial name
- Trachurus trecae Cadenat, 1950

Species of ray-finned fish

The Cunene horse mackerel (Trachurus trecae) is a species of ray-finned fish in the family Carangidae. Their maximum reported length is 35 cm, and the maximum reported weight is 2.0 kg. This species occurs in the eastern Atlantic from Morocco south to Angola.

== Fisheries ==
Global capture production of Cunene horse mackerel (Trachurus trecae) in thousand tonnes from 1950 to 2022, as reported by the FAO
