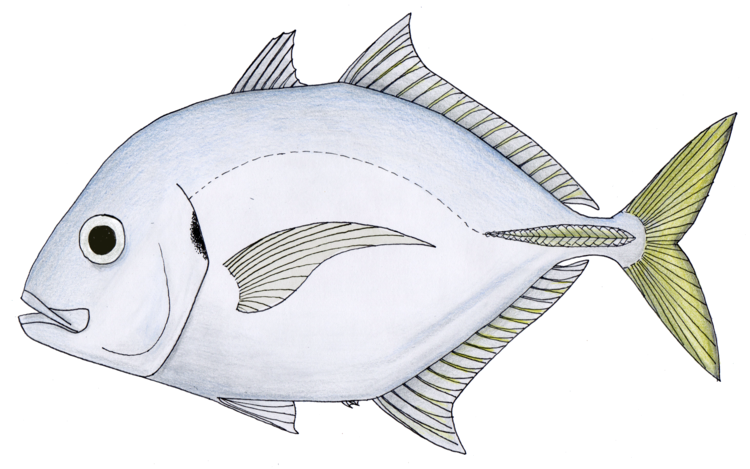

Conservation status
- Least Concern (IUCN 3.1)

Scientific classification
- Kingdom: Animalia
- Phylum: Chordata
- Class: Actinopterygii
- Order: Carangiformes
- Suborder: Carangoidei
- Family: Carangidae
- Genus: Carangoides
- Species: C. talamparoides

Binomial name
- Carangoides talamparoides Bleeker, 1852
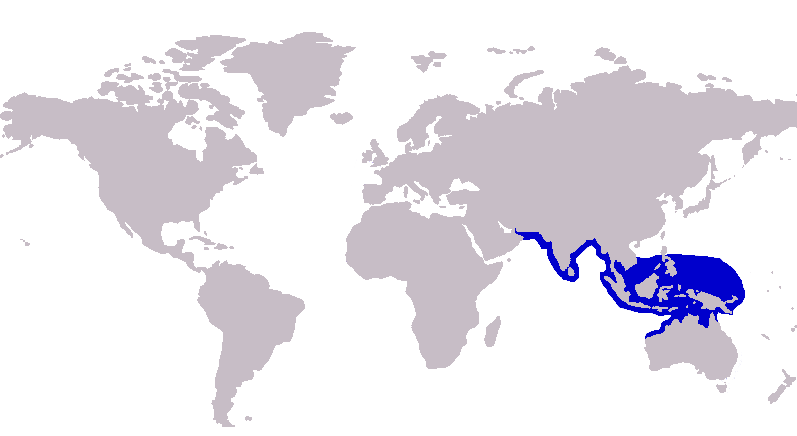
- Approximate range of the imposter trevally

Synonyms
- Caranx talamparoides (Bleeker, 1852); Carangoides gibber Fowler, 1904

= Imposter trevally =

Species of fish

The imposter trevally (Carangoides talamparoides), also known as the imposter jack or white-tongued trevally, is a species of small coastal marine fish in the jack family Carangidae. The imposter trevally is distributed through the tropical waters of Indian and west Pacific oceans, from the Gulf of Oman in the west to Japan and Australia in the east. The species is quite similar to the Malabar trevally, but can be distinguished by its gill raker count, and is identifiable from other species by having a white to pale grey tongue. It is a relatively small species, growing to a maximum recorded length of 30 cm. The imposter trevally inhabits coastal waters of the continental shelf in depths of up to 140 m, often associating with closely related carangid species. It preys on a range of small fish, crustaceans and cephalopods, but little is known of its reproductive biology. The imposter trevally is of minor importance to fisheries throughout its range, taken by hook and line, bottom trawls and several types of artisanal gear.

== Taxonomy and naming ==
The imposter trevally is classified within the genus Carangoides, one of a number of groups of fish referred to as jacks and trevallies. Carangoides falls into the jack and horse mackerel family Carangidae, the Carangidae are part of the order Carangiformes.

The species was first scientifically described by the Dutch ichthyologist Pieter Bleeker in 1852 based on the holotype specimen taken from western Sumatra in Indonesia. Bleeker named this new species Carangoides talamparoides, with the specific epithet having a slightly ambiguous meaning. Talam is a length measurement spanning the length of the thumb to little finger, par is Greek for 'equal' and oides translates to 'like' - possibly indicating the small size of the holotype. Bleeker's classification is still considered to be correct to this day, with some authors incorrectly reassigning the species to Caranx, and only one junior synonym has been applied; Carangoides gibber by Henry Weed Fowler.

== Description ==
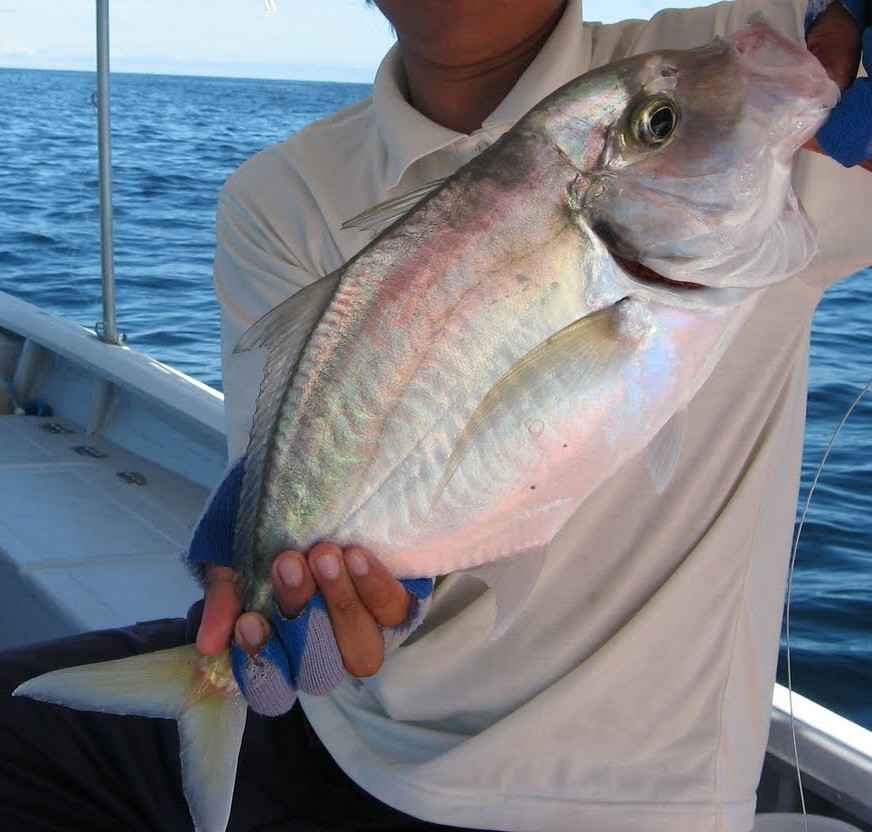
An anglers catch of imposter trevally

The imposter trevally is a relatively small species, growing to a maximum known length of 30 cm, still making it small compared to many of its relatives. The overall shape of the fish is similar to most of the other species in Carangoides, having a strongly compressed, almost ovate body, with the dorsal profile somewhat more convex than the ventral. This asymmetry is due to the dorsal profile of the head being strongly elevated to the nape. The dorsal fin is in two distinct sections; the first consisting of 8 spines and the second of 1 spine and 20 to 23 soft rays. The long section of the anal fin is preceded by two detached spines, while the main fin has 1 spine and 17 to 19 soft rays. The lobes of both the soft dorsal and anal fins are low, being shorter than the head length. The lateral line has a moderate anterior arch, with the curved section of the line much longer than the straight section. There are 32 to 52 scales on the lateral line, with 20 to 32 of these being weak scutes at the base of the caudal fin. The breast is devoid of scales, with this area extending to behind the pelvic fins, and often as far as the anal fin, and reaching as far up as the pectoral fin base. The jaws both have bands of small villiform teeth, with some outer teeth becoming conical at the front of the mouth. There are 27 to 31 gill rakers and 24 vertebrae in total.

The imposter trevally is a silver to bluish grey dorsally, becoming silvery white below. A major distinguishing feature is the white to pale grey tongue, with this also seen in the carangid genus Uraspis although their different body shapes prevent confusion with C. talamparoides. The operculum has a small black spot on its upper margin. The soft dorsal and anal fins are dusky in colour, while the caudal fin is dusky yellow with black distal margins.

== Distribution and habitat ==
The imposter trevally inhabits the tropical waters of the Indian and west Pacific Oceans. Its range extends from the Gulf of Oman through to India and Sri Lanka in the west, with a break in records from Sri Lanka to the Gulf of Thailand. In the west Pacific the imposter trevally inhabits South East Asian waters from the Gulf of Thailand to Sumatra and Borneo. It is distributed east towards the Philippines and Guam, and south to Australia.

The imposter trevally inhabits coastal waters throughout its range, often found over the sandy continental shelf in the waters off North West Australia. Here it is known to form cohabit with Carangoides coeruleopinnatus and Carangoides malabaricus in waters 30 to 140 m deep.

== Biology and fishery ==
Only one study has thoroughly recorded the diet of the imposter trevally, which was carried out in Albatross Bay, Australia. It was found teleost fish made up 73% of its diet, cephalopods 16% and a variety of crustaceans including brachyurans and stomatopods the remainder. It is thought that the coexisting C. coeruleopinnatus and C. malabaricus use diet partitioning to allow this cohabitation. Nothing is known of the species reproduction and growth patterns.

The imposter trevally is of little importance to fisheries throughout its range, occasionally caught using hook and line, bottom trawls and various types of artisanal nets. It is often found in the bycatch of northern Australian prawn trawlers, and usually discarded.
