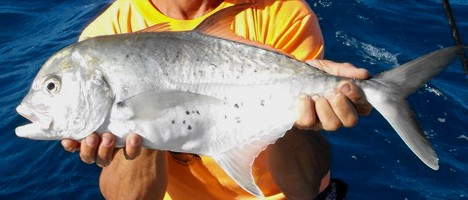

Conservation status
- Least Concern (IUCN 3.1)

Scientific classification
- Kingdom: Animalia
- Phylum: Chordata
- Class: Actinopterygii
- Order: Carangiformes
- Suborder: Carangoidei
- Family: Carangidae
- Genus: Caranx
- Species: C. bucculentus

Binomial name
- Caranx bucculentus Alleyne & W. J. Macleay, 1877
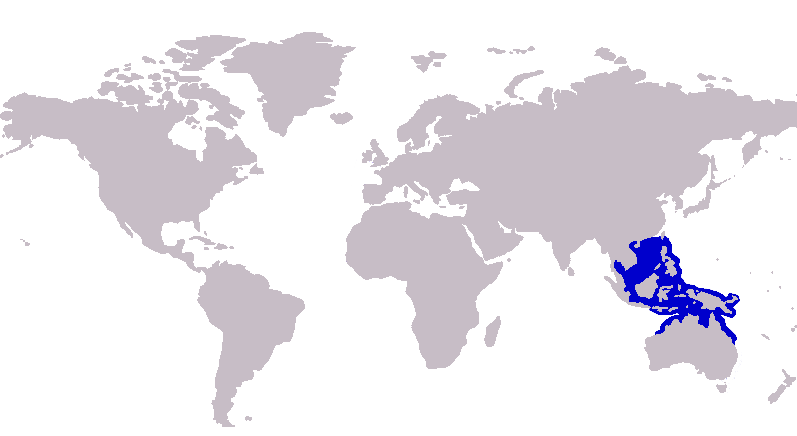
- Approximate range of the bluespotted trevally

= Bluespotted trevally =

Species of fish

The bluespotted trevally (Caranx bucculentus), also known as the wide-mouthed trevally, is a species of moderately large marine fish in the jack family Carangidae. The bluespotted trevally is distributed through the tropical east Indian and west Pacific Oceans, ranging from Taiwan in the north to Australia in the south. It is an inshore species, found in sandy, muddy and seagrass environments, often in large bays. The bluespotted trevally is distinguished by dark blue spots on its upper body, as well as a number of more detailed anatomical features. It is a benthopelagic predator, taking a variety of crustaceans including crabs and prawns as a juvenile, before shifting to a more fish-dominated diet as an adult. It is one of the most common predators in the Gulf of Carpentaria of northern Australia, and is considered the most important predator of commercially important prawn species. Sexual maturity is reached at 110 mm in length and one year of age, with spawning occurring year round with a peak in spring. Growth is estimated to be 82.2 mm per year for both sexes, reaching a maximum known length of 66 cm. Bluespotted trevally are commonly taken as bycatch in prawn fisheries, however are of little commercial value and often discarded. They are occasionally taken by anglers on lures and baits, but are considered mediocre table fare.

== Taxonomy and naming ==
The bluespotted trevally is classified within the genus Caranx, one of a number of groups known as the jacks or trevallies. Caranx itself is part of the larger jack and horse mackerel family Carangidae, part of the order Carangiformes. The species was first scientifically described by the Australian zoologists Haynes Gibbes Alleyne and Sir William John Macleay based on a specimen collected off Cape Grenville, Queensland, which was later designated to be the holotype. They named the species Caranx bucculentus, with the specific epithet meaning 'with full cheeks' in Latin, referring to the species' wide mouth gape. In the original volume of Proceedings of the Linnean Society of New South Wales in which the species was described, the specific name is spelled as bucculantus in the legend, but is considered to be a typographical error and ignored. The species placement in Caranx has never been challenged and no attempts have been made to independently rename the species, making it one of the few members of Caranx to have no synonyms. The commonly used name of 'bluespotted trevally' is in reference to the fishes' body markings, with 'wide-mouthed trevally' also infrequently used.

== Description ==
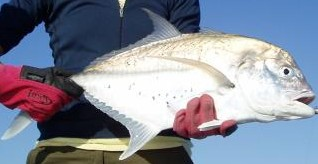
The short, sharply curved front section of the lateral line and blue spots distinguish the species

The bluespotted trevally is a moderately large fish, growing to a known maximum length of 66 cm. It has a body shape characteristic of many of the larger species of Caranx, possessing a strongly compressed, oblong form with the dorsal profile, particularly anteriorly, much more convex than the ventral profile. The dorsal fin is in two distinct sections, the first consisting of eight spines while the second has one spine and 18 or 19 soft rays. The anal fin consists of two detached spines anteriorly followed by one spine and 15 to 17 soft rays, while the pelvic fin has 1 spine followed by 18 soft rays. The species lateral line is very strongly curved over a short length, becoming straight before the origin of the second dorsal fin, with this straight section over 2.5 times the length of the curved section. The curved section contain 40 to 50 scales while the straight section contains no scales, but 33 to 39 strong scutes. The breast is naked ventrally, with this area extending to behind the origin of the pelvic fins and diagonally to the base of pectoral fins. The eyes have a moderately well-developed posterior adipose eyelid which usually extends to the posterior edge of the pupil. The upper jaw contains an outer row of strong canines and an inner band of villiform teeth, while the lower jaw has only a single band of conical teeth. The species has 26 to 31 gill rakers in total and 24 vertebrae.

The bluespotted trevally is a pale olive green above, fading to a more silvery white below, with adults having numerous small blue spots on the upper half of their bodies. The upper end of the opercle has a large dark spot, with a black spot also present at the upper base of the pectoral fins. All the fins are yellow green.

== Distribution and habitat ==
The bluespotted trevally inhabits the tropical waters of the East Indian-West Pacific Ocean, and is restricted to a smaller range than most of its relatives. The species range extends from the waters of the South China Sea around Taiwan and Borneo south through eastern Indonesia and the Arafura Sea around Papua New Guinea. The species is commonly found off northern Australia, especially the Gulf of Carpentaria, but is occasionally seen as far south as Gladstone, Queensland.

The bluespotted trevally is an inshore fish, generally inhabiting coastal waters throughout its range. The species is known to inhabit shallow bays over sand, mud, and rarely seagrass bottoms, as well as slightly deeper waters in bays. Extensive sampling across the Gulf of Carpentaria indicates the maximum biomass for the species occurs at around 28.1 m depth, indicating the species preferentially inhabits substrate of this depth.

== Biology ==
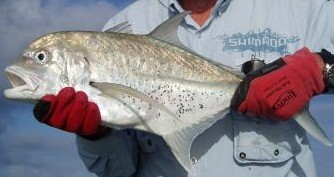
A bluespotted trevally taken from northern Queensland

Considerable research has been conducted on the bluespotted trevally in comparison to most other Indo-Pacific carangids, with this being partly due to the discovery of its abundance and importance in northern Australian shallow water ecosystems. It is one of the top ten most abundant secondary consumers in the system and the most important predator of commercially important prawn species. Successive sampling periods over a period between 1986 and 1991 found no systematic seasonal variations in the species abundance, although interannual variations in numbers occurred. The species also appears to undergo diel vertical migrations as evidenced by markedly decreased catches in demersal night trawls, possibly in response to prey movement.

Bluespotted trevally are predatory fish, consuming a range of crustaceans and fish. Studies in the Gulf of Carpentaria and in particular, Albatross Bay, indicate the species is most common over known prawn grounds. A shift in diet happens with age, with young fish less than 275 mm in length taking penaeids, brachyurans, other crustaceans, echinoderms, and molluscs, while larger fish take mostly small fish. The smaller trevally tend to forage during the day, taking species of small noncommercial species of prawns, while the larger fish took larger, commercially important species at night. Experimental studies indicate the species has low success foraging in seagrass beds and over soft strata where penaeids burrow during the day, but increased efficiency during the night when the prawns emerge to forage. There appears to be little seasonal variation in diet.

Bluespotted trevally reach sexual maturity at around 110 mm in length, usually after their first year of life. This is much earlier than other members of the genus, which attain similar lengths and reach maturity in their second or third years of life. The species spawns year round in the Gulf of Carpentaria with a peak in spring, with between 18,000 and 650,000 eggs released during spawning. The bluespotted trevally grows at a rate of around 82.2 mm per year. Intensive feeding experiments indicate the species can increase its weight by 3.7% and 2.7% of its body weight per day when fed prawns and pilchards, respectively.

== Relationship to humans ==
Despite the large populations of bluespotted trevally, particularly in northern Australia, no major fishery is based around the species. They are taken by trawls and hook-and-line methods throughout their range, but form a considerable proportion of some prawn-trawler bycatches. Despite this, they are generally considered of no worth due to their mediocre reputation as table fish, as well as the possibility of ciguatera poisoning from larger specimens.

Bluespotted trevally are occasionally caught by recreational fishermen on various baits and lures, and are considered to a good sport fish, but tend to be overshadowed by giant trevally and bluefin trevally in reputation.
