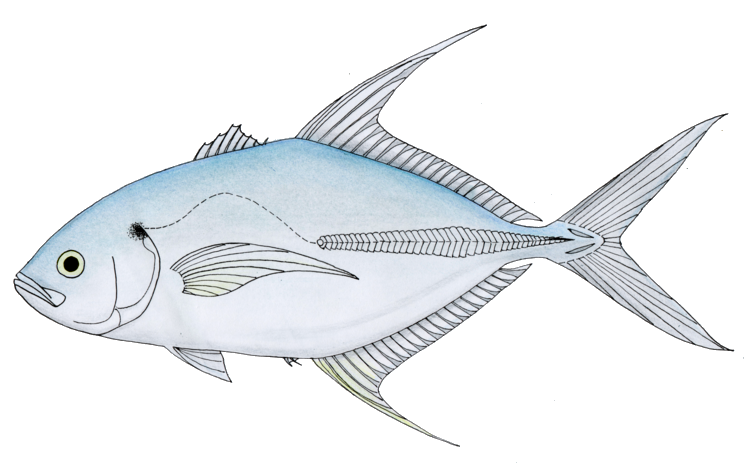

Conservation status
- Least Concern (IUCN 3.1)

Scientific classification
- Kingdom: Animalia
- Phylum: Chordata
- Class: Actinopterygii
- Order: Carangiformes
- Suborder: Carangoidei
- Family: Carangidae
- Genus: Caranx
- Species: C. senegallus

Binomial name
- Caranx senegallus G. Cuvier, 1833
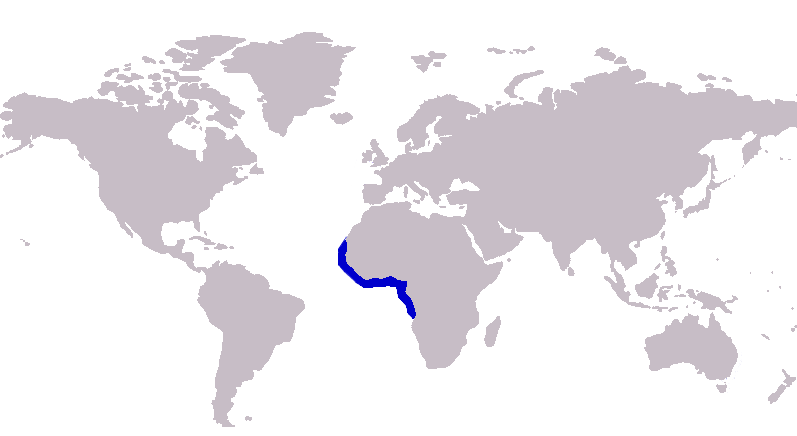
- Approximate range of the Senegal jack

Synonyms
- Caranx macrops Steindachner, 1867; Caranx africanus Steindachner, 1883

= Senegal jack =

Species of fish

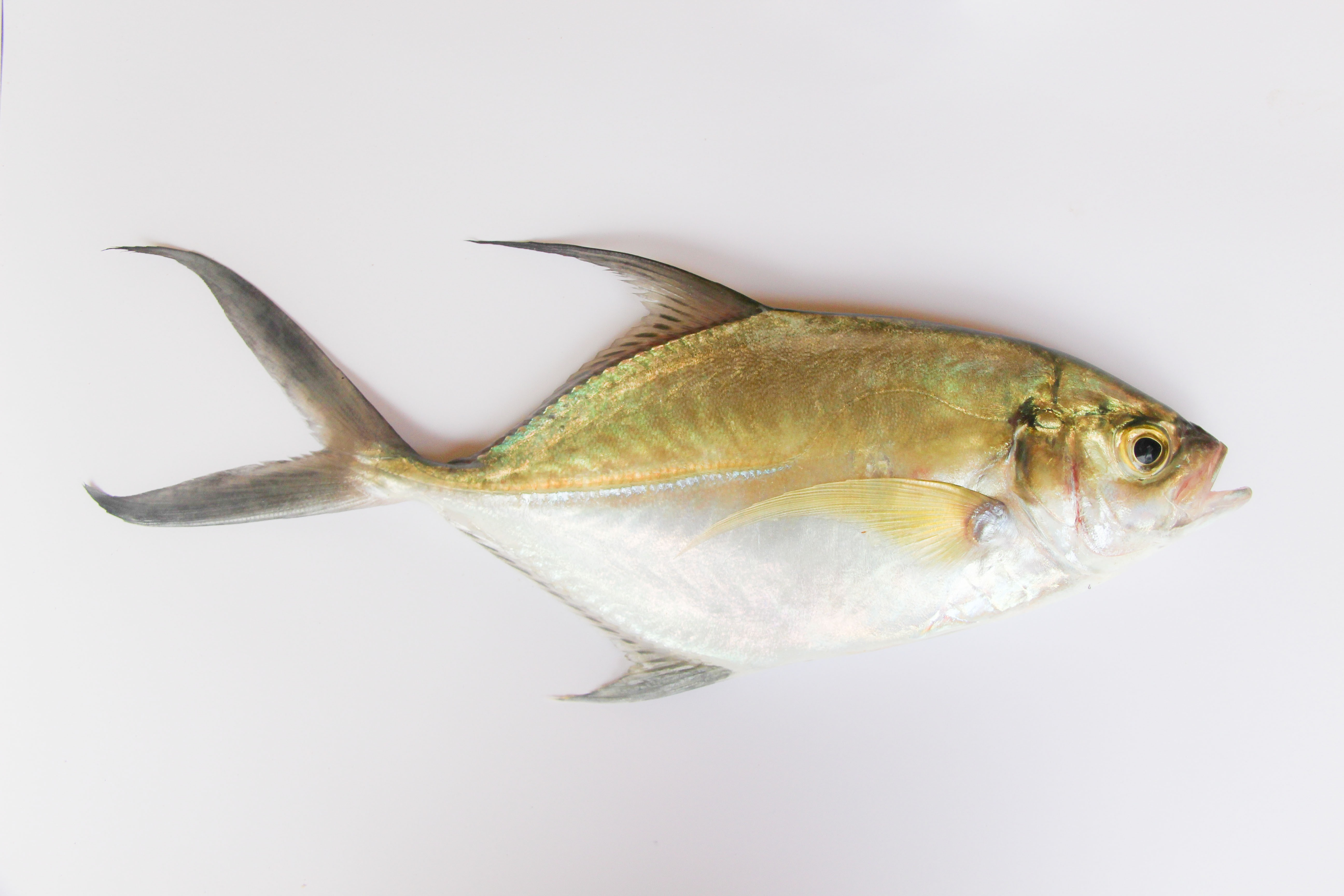
Senegal jack caught in The Gambia

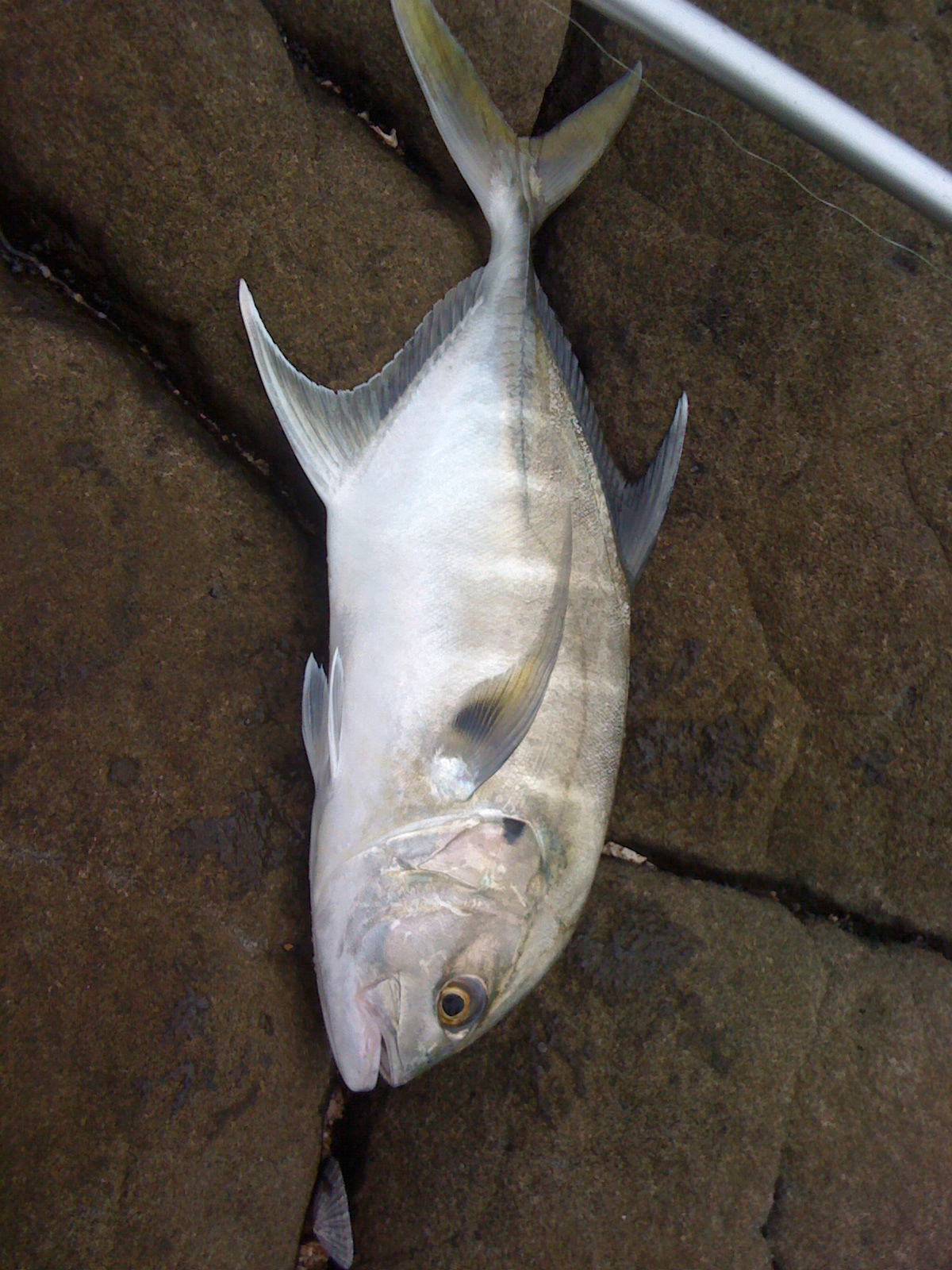
Caranx Senegallus

The Senegal jack (Caranx senegallus), also known as the African jack, is a species of large marine fish classified in the jack family Carangidae. The species is distributed through the tropical waters of the eastern Atlantic Ocean, ranging along the west African coast from Angola in the south to Mauritania in the north. It can be distinguished from co-occurring relatives by its longer dorsal fin lobe, as well as a host of other anatomical features. The Senegal jack grows to a known maximum length of 1 m. It is a coastal species, known to live semi-pelagically, inhabiting both the sea floor and surface waters to depths of around 200 m. The Senegal jack is a predatory species, taking fish, crabs and shrimps as its main prey items. The species reaches sexual maturity at 21 cm in females and 24 cm in males, with spawning occurring in two periods; February to April and September to November. The species is of minor importance to fisheries, and is not discriminated from other jacks in catch statistics. It is taken by trawls, seines and hook and line, and sold fresh or preserved.

== Taxonomy and naming ==
The Senegal jack is classified within the genus Caranx, one of a number of groups known as the jacks or trevallies. Caranx itself is part of the larger jack and horse mackerel family Carangidae, which in turn is part of the order Carangiformes.

The species was first scientifically described by the famed French naturalist Georges Cuvier in 1833 based on a specimen taken from the mouth of the Senegal River at Gorée, Senegal, which was designated to be the holotype. Cuvier named the new species Caranx senegallus with the specific epithet referring to the country the holotype was taken from. The species was independently redescribed twice; both times by the Austrian zoologist Franz Steindachner. In 1867 he named the species Caranx macrops, while in 1883 he named it Caranx africanus, with no apparent reason for the redescription. Under ICZN naming rules, these are both considered junior synonyms and rendered invalid. The species' two common names simply refer to the African coasts where the species is found.

== Description ==
The Senegal jack is a large species of fish, known to reach a length of 1 m, but is more common at around 30 cm. It has a body shape typical of most other species of Caranx, with a moderately compressed ovate form and blunt pointed snout. The dorsal profile is slightly more convex than the ventral profile. The dorsal fin is in two distinct sections, the first consisting of 8 spines while the second has 1 spine and 20 or 21 soft rays. The anal fin consists of 2 detached spines anteriorly followed by 1 spine and 17 or 18 soft rays. Both the anal and dorsal fins are elongate, with the dorsal lobe being over twice the length of the head. The pectoral fin is falcate, and also longer than the head. The lateral line has a short, strong anterior arch, with 40 to 45 scutes on the straight posterior section. Above and below the terminus of the lateral line on the caudal peduncle are bilateral caudal keels. The rest of the body is covered in small cycloid scales, with the exception of the breast which is naked. The Senegal jack's eye has a weakly developed adipose eyelid, with the end of the upper jaw extending to directly under the middle of the eye. The upper jaw contains an inner band of villiform teeth with an irregular series of outer canines, while the lower jaw contains only a band of villiform teeth. The species has 38 to 42 gill rakers and 24 vertebrae.

The Senegal jack is a green to blue colour dorsally, fading to a silvery white below. The fins are hyaline to grey, with the pectoral fin and anal fin lobe having a pale yellow tinge. The species has a black spot on the upper opercular margin.

== Distribution and habitat ==
The Senegal jack has a relatively restricted range compared to most of the other members of Caranx. It is distributed through the tropical waters of the eastern Atlantic Ocean, ranging along the west African coast from Angola in the south to Mauritania in the north.

The Senegal jack is an inshore species, living semi-pelagically, moving between surface and bottom layers in coastal waters. It is confidently known to range to a depth of at least 90 m, although may live at depths of around 200 m. Older fish tend to live further from the shore on reefs, while juveniles inhabit shallow tidal bays and creeks lined with mangroves. The species is also known to occur in estuaries in significant numbers, inhabiting these on a semi-permanent basis.

== Biology and habitat ==
The Senegal jack is a predatory fish, taking a variety of small fishes, crabs and shrimps. The species shows a difference in age of maturation between the sexes, with males reaching sexual maturity at 24 cm and females at 21 cm. Spawning has been documented in Guinea Bissau during two peaks throughout the year; the first occurring from February to April and the second from September to November. Spawning occurs in shallow waters, with larvae and juveniles known to inhabit shallow tidal creeks and estuaries. The juveniles migrate back to the deeper marine environment as they grow.

== Relationship with humans ==
The Senegal jack is of minor importance to fisheries throughout its range, although individual fisheries statistics are not available for the species, so its exact importance can not be quantified. It is taken using trawls, purse seines and hook and line gear, and is generally counted with other species of Caranx in a catch. Senegal jack is sold fresh, frozen, salted and smoked as well as being used for fish meal and oil. The species is also considered a gamefish in larger sizes. The IGFA all tackle world record for the species stands at 9.50 kg (20 lb 15 oz) caught in the Bissagos Islands of Guinea-Bissau in 1995.
