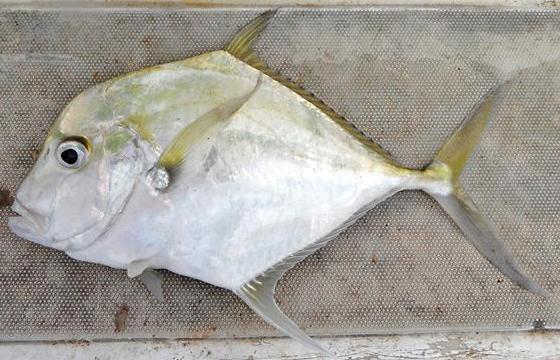

Conservation status
- Least Concern (IUCN 3.1)

Scientific classification
- Kingdom: Animalia
- Phylum: Chordata
- Class: Actinopterygii
- Division: Teleostei
- Order: Carangiformes
- Suborder: Carangoidei
- Family: Carangidae
- Genus: Alectis
- Species: A. alexandrina

Binomial name
- Alectis alexandrina (É. Geoffroy Saint-Hilaire, 1817)
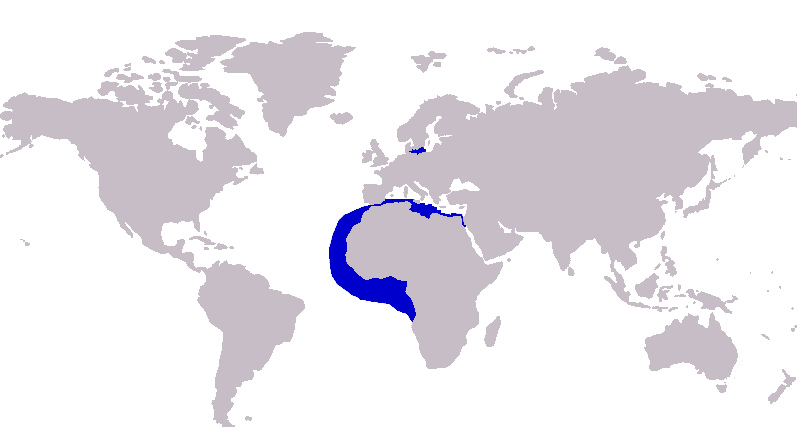
- Approximate distribution of the African threadfish. Note there is only one record for the Adriatic Sea.

Synonyms
- Gallus alexandrinus Geoffroy Saint-Hilaire, 1817; Scyris alexandrina (Geoffroy Saint-Hilaire, 1817); Scyris alexandrinus (Geoffroy Saint-Hilaire, 1817); Vomer alexandrinus (Geoffroy Saint-Hilaire, 1817); Caranx alexandrinus (Geoffroy Saint-Hilaire, 1817); Blepharis alexandrinus (Geoffroy Saint-Hilaire, 1817); Alectis alexandrinus (Geoffroy Saint-Hilaire, 1817); Gallichthys aegyptiacus (Cuvier, 1833); Caranx goreensis (Cuvier, 1833); Hynnis goreensis (Cuvier, 1833); Selene goreensis (Cuvier, 1833)

= African threadfish =

Species of fish

The African threadfish (Alectis alexandrina), also known as the Alexandria pompano, is a species of large marine fish in the jack family, Carangidae. The species is distributed along the coast of tropical Africa in the eastern Atlantic Ocean, extending to the Mediterranean Sea. Adults live predominantly in waters shallower than 70 m deep, often forming small schools. The African threadfish is similar in appearance to the closely related and co-occurring African pompano, with the species' most definitive feature its slightly concave head profile. Like other members of the genus Alectis, the juveniles of the species have long trailing dorsal and anal fins. The African threadfish is of minor commercial importance, and is also considered to be a game fish.

== Taxonomy and naming ==
The African threadfish is one of three members of the diamond trevally genus Alectis, which is one of 33 genera in the jack and horse mackerel family Carangidae. The Carangidae are part of the order Carangiformes.

The species has a complex taxonomic history, featuring two species descriptions. The first description was made by the French naturalist Étienne Geoffroy Saint-Hilaire in 1817, in which he named the species Gallus alexandrinus, using the generic name Gallus which had been created by Lacépède after he recognised the genus distinct from Zeus, a genus of dories. However, Gallus was preoccupied by a bird, leading to the reassignment of the species to at least six different genera, before the species was placed in Alectis. The second description was made by Georges Cuvier in 1833 under the name of Gallichthys aegyptiacus. This name was also re-evaluated twice, before the description was discarded as a junior synonym of A. alexandrina. The species has also been incorrectly referred to as Alectis alexandrinus. However the genus is feminine and so alexandrina is the correct spelling.

The common names 'African threadfish' and 'Alexandria pompano' are in reference to the species prominent distribution around Africa, as well as the thread like appearance of the juveniles dorsal and anal fins.

== Description ==
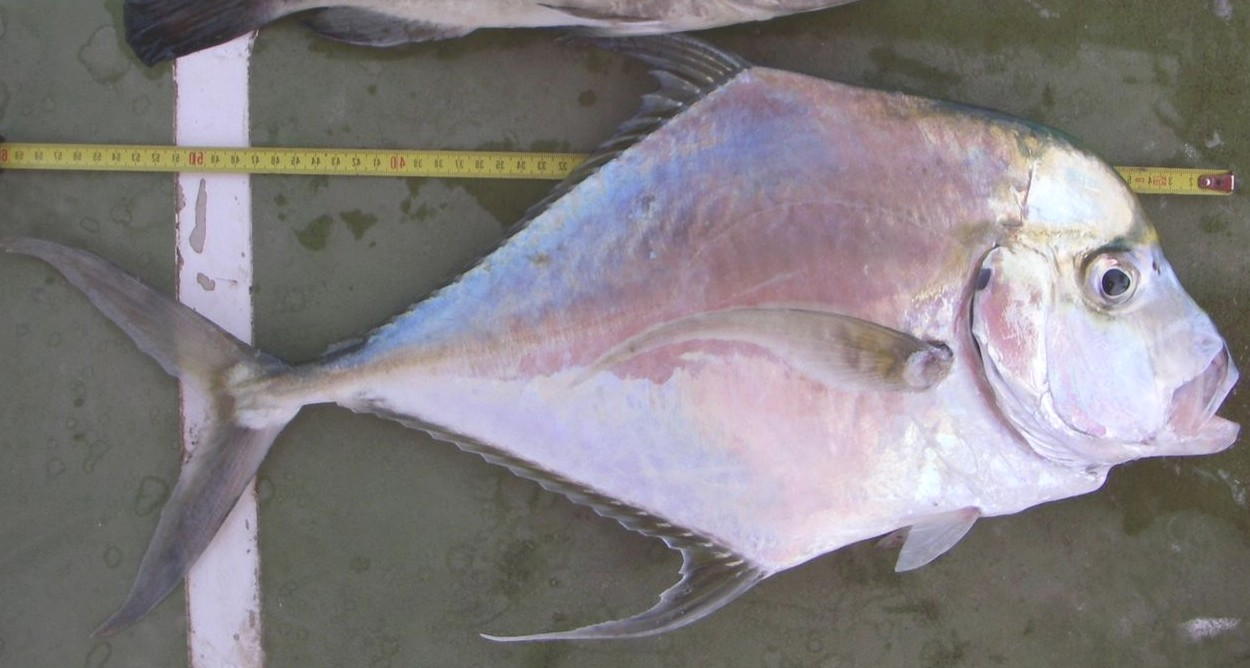
African threadfish have a slight concavity to their forehead profile

The African threadfish has the typical body structure of a large jack, with a distinctly angular, strongly compressed body. The major identifying feature of the species is its head profile, having a slight concavity near the eyes which distinguishes it from the African pompano. The dorsal profile of the fish is more curved than the ventral profile, and the body is deepest between the origins of the soft dorsal and soft anal fins. The first section of the dorsal fin consists of 5 to 7 visible spines, with the second section having one spine and 20 to 22 soft rays. The anal fin has two spines followed by a single spine and 18 or 19 soft rays. The pectoral fin is long and curved, extending beyond the junction of the straight and curved sections of the lateral line. Anterior to the caudal fin are two oblate keels on each side of the line of scutes. The body appears to be scaleless, but on closer inspection has minute, deeply embedded scales. The lateral line is strongly curved anteriorly, with a section of 6 to 11 scutes toward the tail. Juveniles and often adults have long, filamentous trailing first anal and dorsal fin spines, a trait of all members of Alectis. The species grows to at least 1 m in length.

The African threadfish is silver in colour, often with blue and greenish tints and reflection, especially when fresh. The fins are all a pale silvery green to blue colour, or hyaline. Juveniles may show two dark bands on their lower bodies.

== Distribution and habitat ==
The African threadfish is primarily distributed throughout the tropical eastern Atlantic Ocean, inhabiting the waters of West Africa from Morocco around to Angola. The species also has had several individuals taken from the Mediterranean and one extreme capture in the Adriatic Sea.

Adults are generally solitary in coastal waters, occupying lower parts of the water column, down to at least 70 m. Juveniles are usually pelagic and drift with ocean currents, sometimes ending up in estuarine environments.

== Biology ==
Limited information is available on the species biology, with only the diet of the species confirmed. The African threadfish feeds on squid and other fishes. The reproduction in the species is largely unknown, but observations on Alectis ciliaris suggest individual fish may pair and then spawn.

== Relationship to humans ==
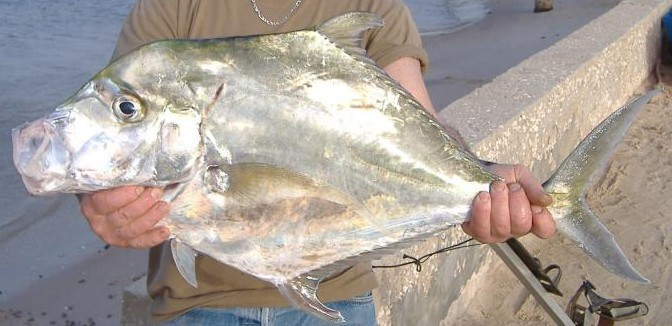
African threadfish taken off Ghana

The species is of minor importance to local fisheries throughout its range, and is also considered a good game fish, especially in larger sizes. The species is rarely targeted by anglers though, due to its comparative rarity. The fish also fetches high prices at market, unlike many other members of the Carangidae. The IGFA world record for the species stands at 8.10 kg (17 lb 14 oz) caught off of Daklha, Morocco in 1993.
