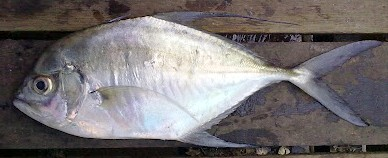

Conservation status
- Least Concern (IUCN 3.1)

Scientific classification
- Kingdom: Animalia
- Phylum: Chordata
- Class: Actinopterygii
- Order: Carangiformes
- Suborder: Carangoidei
- Family: Carangidae
- Genus: Atropus
- Species: A. aurochs

Binomial name
- Atropus aurochs (J. D. Ogilby, 1915)

Synonyms
- Citula aurochs Ogilby, 1915; Carangoides aurochs (Ogilby, 1915); Caranx aurochs (Ogilby, 1915); Ulua aurochs (Ogilby, 1915)

= Atropus aurochs =

Species of fish

Atropos aurochs, the silvermouth trevally, is a species of trevally in the family Carangidae. It is found in the Indo-Pacific.

== Distribution and habitat ==
The silvermouth trevally is found in the Indo-Pacific in the western and central Pacific Ocean. Its range is from New Guinea, northern Australia, the Philippines, and Pacific islands in the western and central Pacific Ocean.

== Description ==
Adults can grow up to 50 centimetres (20 in).
