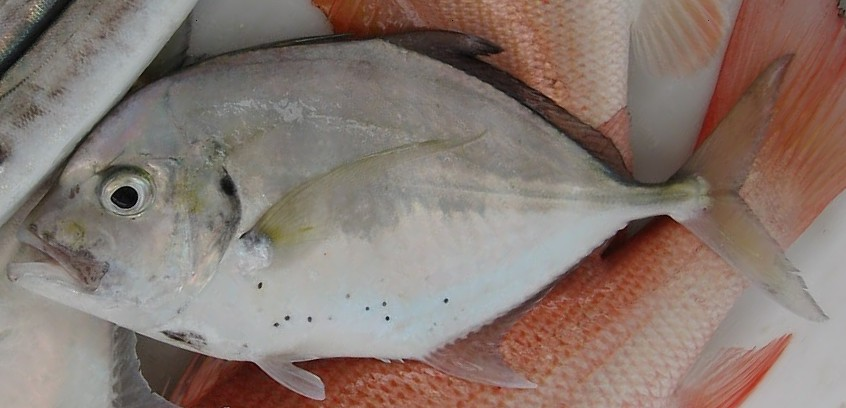

Conservation status
- Least Concern (IUCN 3.1)

Scientific classification
- Kingdom: Animalia
- Phylum: Chordata
- Class: Actinopterygii
- Order: Carangiformes
- Suborder: Carangoidei
- Family: Carangidae
- Genus: Carangoides
- Species: C. malabaricus

Binomial name
- Carangoides malabaricus (Bloch & Schneider, 1801)
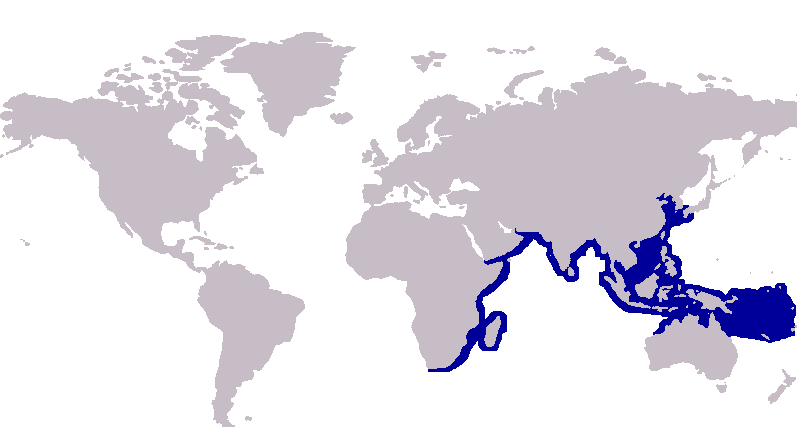
- Range of the Malabar trevally

Synonyms
- Scomber malabaricus, (Bloch & Schneider, 1801); Caranx malabaricus, (Bloch & Schneider, 1801); Carangoides rectipinnus, (Williams, 1958); Carangoides rhomboides, (Kotthaus, 1974)

= Malabar trevally =

Species of fish

The Malabar trevally (Carangoides malabaricus), also known as the Malabar jack, Malabar kingfish or nakedshield kingfish, is a species of large inshore marine fish of the jack family, Carangidae. It is distributed throughout the Indian and west Pacific Oceans from South Africa in the west to Japan and Australia in the east, inhabiting reefs and sandy bays on the continental shelf. The Malabar trevally is similar to many of the other species in the genus Carangoides, with the number of gill rakers and the grey-brown colour of the tongue being the diagnostic features. The Malabar trevally is a predator, taking a variety of small fish, cephalopods and crustaceans. The species is of minor economic importance throughout its range, caught by a variety of net and handline methods.

== Taxonomy and naming ==
The Malabar trevally is one of 21 species in the genus Carangoides which falls into the jack and horse mackerel family Carangidae, the Carangidae are part of the order Carangiformes.

The Malabar trevally was first scientifically described by German ichthyologists Marcus Elieser Bloch and Johann Gottlob Schneider in the massive 1801 volume of Systema Ichthyologiae iconibus cx illustratum, a book which is the taxonomic authority of many fish species. The species was first published under the name Scomber malabaricus, implying the species was related closely to the true mackerels. This was found to be incorrect, and the species was first transferred to Caranx, another genus of jack, and finally to Carangoides by Williams and Venkataramani in 1978, remaining there since. The species was also completely redescribed twice in its history, the first time by Williams in 1958 under the name Carangoides rectipinnus, and again in 1974 by Kotthaus, who named the species Carangoides rhomboides. These two names are considered junior synonyms under the ICZN rules for classification and therefore are discarded. In English, the species nearly always goes under the common name of Malabar trevally, with the name Malabar kingfish rarely used. A wide number of local names in other languages are also in use. Malabar is a region of southern India, from where the type locality of the fish, Tranquebar, was recorded.

== Description ==
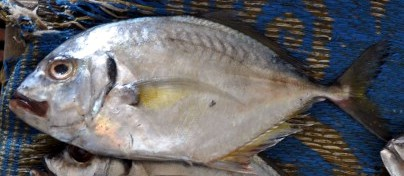
The Malabar travally is best distinguished from C. talamparoides be the lack of breast scales

The Malabar trevally has the typical body profile of a jack, with a strongly compressed body almost ovate in shape with long dorsal and anal fins. The top of the head is strongly elevated to nape, and almost straight. Both jaws have bands of small villiform teeth, although the anterior teeth may be conical in shape. The gill rakers number eight to 12 on the upper limb and 21 to 27 on the lower limb of the first gill arch. The species has 24 vertebrae, 10 upper and 14 lower. The dorsal fin is divided into two segments; a short, high fin containing eight spines and a second, long fin consisting of one spine followed by 20 to 23 soft rays. The anal fin has 2 detached spines followed by a single spine connected to 17 to 19 soft rays. The lateral line has a moderate anterior curve before, intersecting the straight section between the twelfth and fourteenth soft rays of the second dorsal fin. The straight section of the lateral line contains 19 to 36 weak scutes, and 31 to 55 combined scutes and scales on the entire line. The breast area of the fish is devoid of any scales, reaching from each pectoral fin back to the pelvic fin and occasionally to the origin of the anal fin. The species reaches a maximum known length 60 cm (24 in), although is much more common below 30 cm (12 in).

The colour of the Malabar trevally is usually a silver overlain by a bluish-grey hue on the upper side of the fish fading to a silvery white on the underside and lower flanks. The opercle has a single small black spot on the upper margin, and the tongue is a distinctive greyish brown to brown. The caudal fin, soft dorsal and anal fins are pale greenish yellow to dusky, while other fins are hyaline in appearance. The tips of the dorsal, anal and caudal fins are occasionally edged in a shade of white.

== Distribution and habitat ==
The Malabar trevally is broadly distributed in the tropical and subtropical regions of the Indian and Pacific Oceans. It occurs from South Africa and Madagascar in the west, north along the east African coast and into the Persian Gulf, but has not been recorded from the Red Sea since 1860, where a capture was reported under the name Caranx malabaricus. Its range stretches east to Sri Lanka, Thailand, Indonesia, and a number of small Pacific islands including Vanuatu and New Caledonia. It reaches as far north as Japan, and south to northern Australia. The species is rare in a number of Pacific nations, including Taiwan and Japan, with only a few recorded captures.

The species lives in a variety of inshore habitats, generally present in waters 30 to 140 m deep on coral and rocky reefs. Juveniles tend to school in shallow sandy bays and are able to tolerate moderately turbid waters. At least one recorded capture from an estuary in Thailand has been reported.

== Biology ==
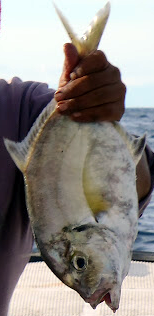
An anglers catch of Malabar trevally

The Malabar trevally often schools, especially as juveniles in shallow bays, becoming more solitary as they age.

The species is not particularly aggressive, feeding on small planktonic and pelagic crustaceans such as krill, prawns, shrimp, and mysids, as well as small squids and fishes. Geographical variation in diet is common, with fish in Malaysia taking species of polychaete worms as the preferred species. Studies on gill filtering mechanisms has shown the Malabar trevally's anatomy lies between two extremes, one which is a high filtration area characteristic of planktivorous species and the other of very low area which is associated with species which take large prey items. This further suggests the Malabar trevally can filter the small krill type prey, as well as taking larger fishes and squid. Seasonal diet fluctuation in the species has been observed in northern Australia, where a seasonal abundance of squid causes the preferred prey to change from paenid shrimp to these squid.

Little is known of its breeding cycle, with the only publication on the subject part of a 1984 study in Indian waters. The Malabar trevally's breeding period was reported as between February and October in this location, with the main peak from July to September. Each individual spawned only once per year. The size at which the species is first able to breed is 161 mm (6.3 in) for both sexes, with the number of eggs produced related to each individual's length and weight. In South Africa, seasonal small shoals of juveniles are known from parts of the coast, suggesting a single spawning event, also. The species is relatively short-lived like many tropical species, but has a fairly rapid population turnover.

== Relationship to humans ==
The Malabar trevally is of minor importance to fisheries in most regions it inhabits, often considered too small to be worth actively targeting. In these regions, it still forms a considerable proportion of the bycatch, and studies have shown that at the current level of removal, the species is ecologically sustainable. In India and parts of Southeast Asia, however, the species is more commercially important and taken in larger quantities than elsewhere. The FAO recorded a total of 278 t (274 long tons; 306 short tons) of the fish were caught as bycatch from the Persian Gulf in 2001. The species is caught by a variety of methods - hook-and-line, bottom trawls, gill nets, and traps. In South Africa, the species is often caught by anglers using light tackle and baits such as prawns and small fish, as well as occasionally being speared by divers. It is considered, like most carangids, to be poor to fair table food, becoming dryer at larger sizes with larger fish having an increased chance of carrying ciguatera poisoning.
