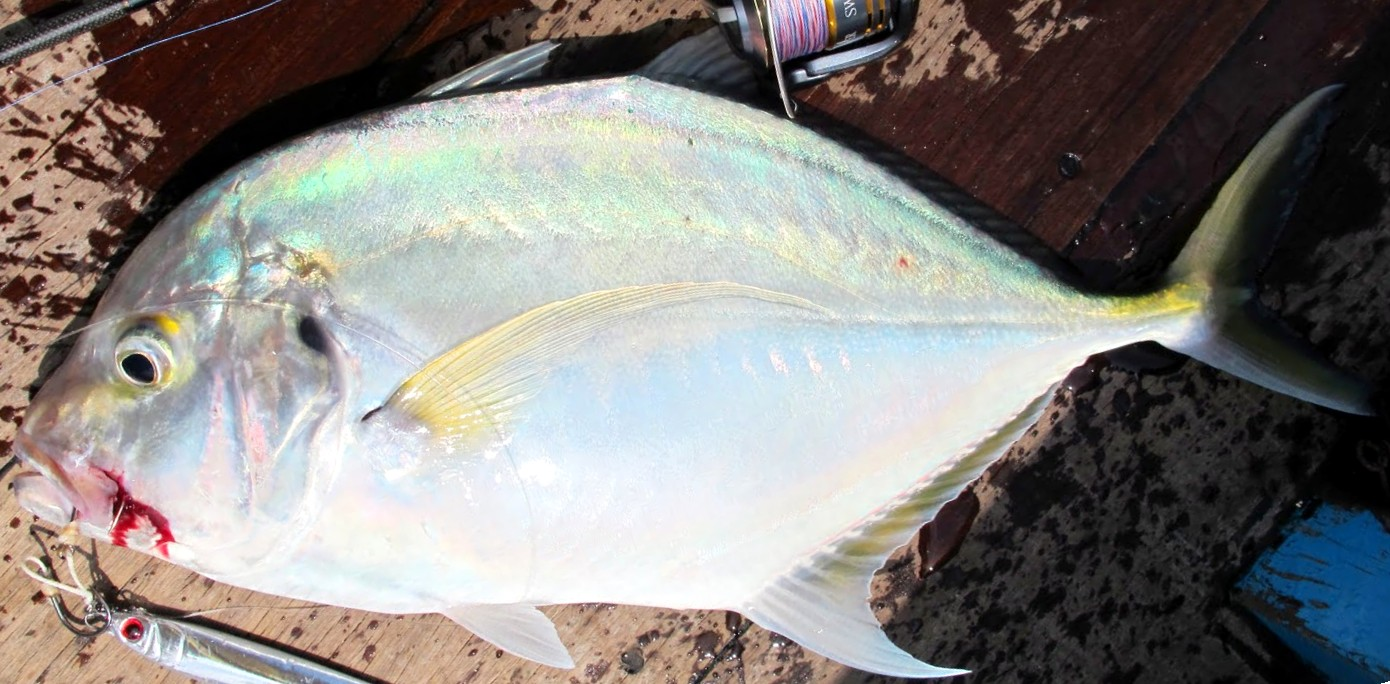

Conservation status
- Least Concern (IUCN 3.1)

Scientific classification
- Kingdom: Animalia
- Phylum: Chordata
- Class: Actinopterygii
- Order: Carangiformes
- Suborder: Carangoidei
- Family: Carangidae
- Genus: Carangoides
- Species: C. coeruleopinnatus

Binomial name
- Carangoides coeruleopinnatus (Rüppell, 1830)
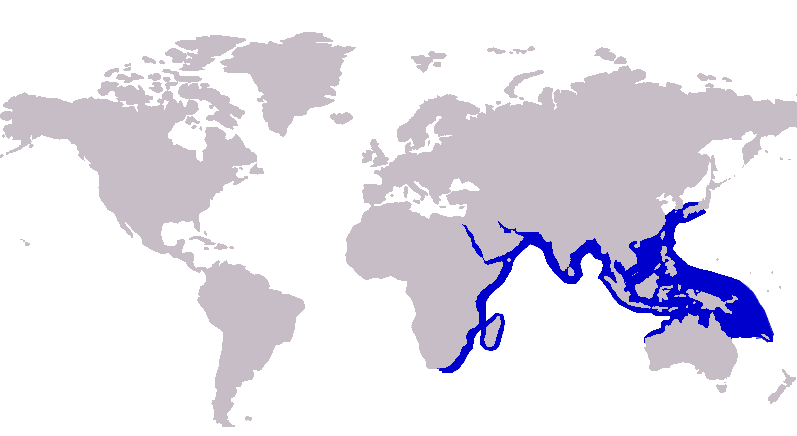
- Approximate range of the coastal trevally

Synonyms
- Carangoides coeruleopinnatus (Rüppell, 1830); Caranx coeruleopinnatus Rüppell, 1830; Carangoides caeruleopinnatus (Rüppell, 1830); Citula coeruleopinnata (Rüppell, 1830); Caranx altissimus Jordan & Seale, 1905; Carangoides altissimus (Jordan & Seale, 1905); Caranx formosanus Jordan & Snyder, 1908; Caranx uii Wakiya, 1924; Carangoides uii (Wakiya, 1924); Citula diversa Whitley, 1940

= Coastal trevally =

Species of fish

The coastal trevally (Carangoides coeruleopinnatus), also known as the onion trevally, Japanese trevally or bluefin kingfish, is a species of inshore marine fish in the jack family Carangidae. The species is distributed throughout the tropical and subtropical waters of the Indian and west Pacific Oceans, from South Africa in the west to Japan and New Caledonia in the east, reaching as far south as Australia. The species is found on deep coastal reefs, both in schools and as solitary individuals, where they prey on small midwater organisms including crustaceans, small fish and cephalopods. The species is taken as bycatch in a number of fisheries throughout its range by a number of fishing methods and is of little commercial value, but is considered to be a good table fish. A mistype in the original volume in which Eduard Rüppell named the species led to the combination Carangoides caeruleopinnatus, which has incorrectly spread through the literature.

== Taxonomy and naming ==
The coastal trevally is formally classified within the genus Carangoides, one of a number of groups of fish referred to as jacks and trevallies. Carangoides is further classified in the family Carangidae, the Carangidae are part of the order Carangiformes.

The species was first scientifically described and named by the German naturalist Eduard Rüppell in 1830 based on a specimen collected from the waters of the Red Sea off Saudi Arabia, which was designated to be the holotype. He named the new species Caranx coeruleopinnatus, with the species name translating to 'blue-finned', although the species shows no such colouration, and may be the result of some confusion by the author. In the volume in which the species is described, an apparent mistype produces the name Caranx caeruleopinnatus, which has also widely, albeit incorrectly, entered the scientific literature. The species was transferred initially to the genus Citula, a now defunct genus of jacks, before moving to its current status in Carangoides. The species has also been independently renamed five times; the first as Carangoides ophthalmotaenia by Pieter Bleeker in 1852 and most recently as Citula diversa by Gilbert Whitley in 1940. In 1924, a juvenile specimen was named Caranx uii by Yojiro Wakiya, a name which became widespread throughout the literature, and was commonly known as the 'Japanese trevally', before being sunk into C. coeruleopinnatus in 1986 by William Smith-Vaniz.

The species is commonly known as the 'coastal trevally' or 'coastal kingfish', with other commonly applied English names including 'onion trevally', 'Japanese trevally', 'bluefin kingfish', 'shortfin kingfish', and 'diverse trevally'.

== Description ==
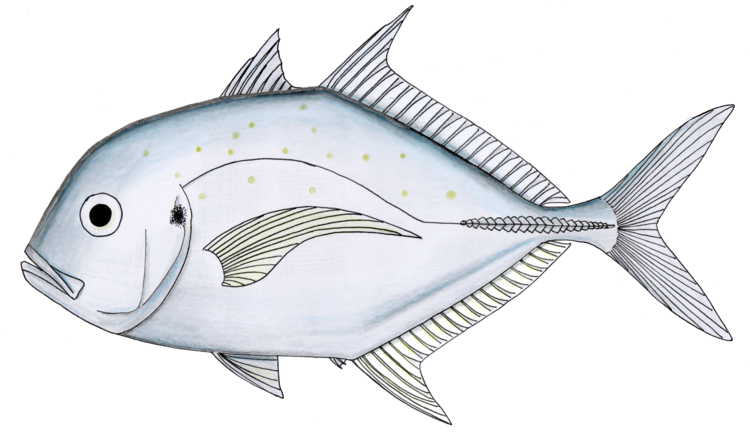
Carangoides coeruleopinnatus

The coastal trevally is similar in body to most other jacks, having a nearly ovate, strongly compressed body, with the dorsal profile more convex than the ventral profile, with a moderately curved nape. It is moderately large, growing to a recorded maximum of 40 cm, although more commonly seen at around 25 cm. The dorsal fin is divided into two distinct sections, the first consisting of 8 spines, with the second consisting of a single spine followed by 20 to 23 soft rays. The lobe of the second dorsal fin is filamentous in juveniles, becoming shorter with age until at the adult stage, the lobe is shorter than the head length and the anal fin lobe. The anal fin consists of 2 detached spines followed by 1 spine anterior to 16 to 20 soft rays. The pelvic fin contains a single spine and 18 to 20 soft rays. The lateral line has a moderate anterior arch, with the junction of the curved and straight section below the 12th to 14th dorsal ray. The straight section of the lateral line contains 16 to 20 scutes, with the lateral line having 31 to 50 combined scales and scutes over its entire length. The breast is devoid of scales ventrally to behind the pelvic fin origin and up to the pectoral fin base, although in rare cases this is interrupted by a lateral band of scales. Both jaws contain bands of villiform teeth, with the bands becoming wider anteriorly. There are a total of 21 to 27 gill rakers and 24 vertebrae.

In life, the coastal trevally is bluish green above, fading to a silvery grey on the underside, with the sides having many small yellow spots. There is a small dark blotch on the upper margin of the opercle. The dorsal, anal and caudal fins are dusky, although the caudal is often slightly yellow, while the pectoral fins are pale yellow and the pelvic fins are hyaline to grey. Juveniles have dark vertical bands which fade as the fish become adults, and become indistinct at larger sizes.

== Distribution and habitat ==
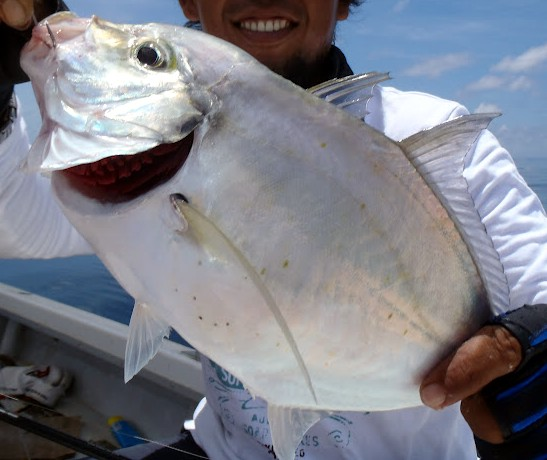
An anglers catch of coastal trevally

The coastal trevally is distributed broadly throughout the tropical and subtropical waters of the Indian and west Pacific Oceans. Its westernmost limit is the east coast of Africa, from South Africa and Madagascar north to the Red Sea and the Persian Gulf, with the range extending east along the coast of India, including Sri Lanka. The species is distributed across the Asian coastline including China and Thailand, and throughout the South East Asian and Indonesian island chains extending to northern Australia. In the Pacific Ocean, its range extends north to Taiwan and Japan, and east to a number of small island groups, including Tonga, Samoa and New Caledonia.

Coastal trevally are rarely found close to shore, with adults inhabiting deep coastal reef systems, and the species is also thought to live a pelagic lifestyle. Juveniles have been recorded in Natal estuaries, and in shallow bays in northern Australia, but the movements of the species are poorly understood. Like other species of jack, the coastal trevally is attracted to floating devices, with the fish occasionally caught by anglers around specially built FADs (fish attracting devices).

== Biology and fishery ==
The coastal trevally is poorly studied, and as such there is little information regarding its biology and ecology. The species is known to occur both in small shoals and individually, and is a planktonivorous fish, consuming small midwater organisms including krill, mantis shrimp, small fish and squid. The mouth of the coastal trevally is soft, and the teeth fairly weak, which prevents the capture of larger prey items. It is a rather sluggish fish in comparison to other members of the Carangidae. Nothing is known of reproduction in the species, and its movements are also unknown.

The coastal trevally is of little or no importance to most fisheries throughout its range, occasionally taken as bycatch in finfish and prawn operations, using hook and line, gill nets and other various types of trap. Due to its deep reef nature, the species is of little interest to anglers, and is rarely taken by them. The coastal trevally is considered to be a good table fish, however, and it has limited commercial value in Asia.
