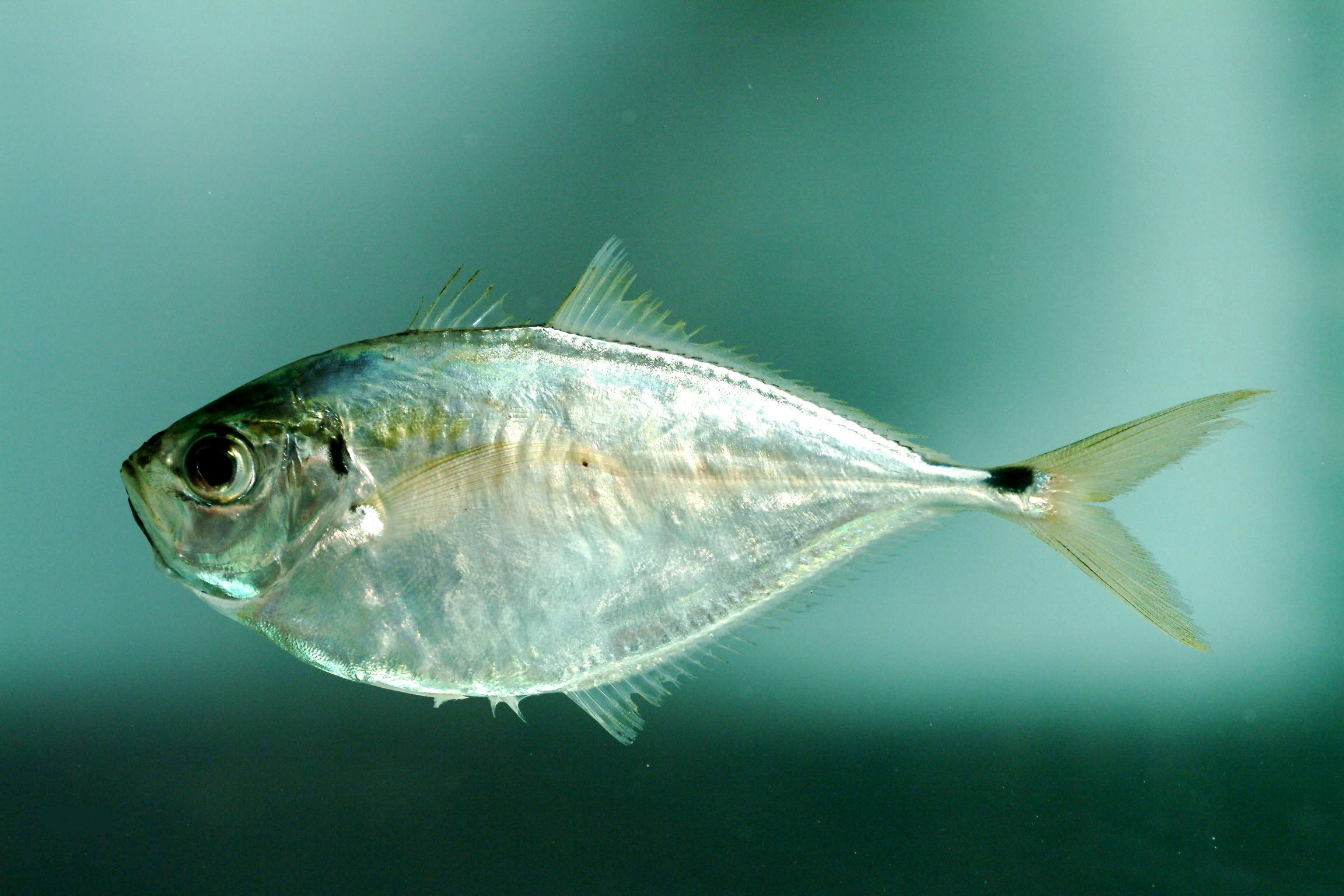
- Atlantic bumper, Chloroscombrus chrysurus

Scientific classification
- Kingdom: Animalia
- Phylum: Chordata
- Class: Actinopterygii
- Order: Carangiformes
- Suborder: Carangoidei
- Family: Carangidae
- Subfamily: Caranginae
- Genus: Chloroscombrus; Girard, 1858

Type species
- Micropteryx cosmopolita Agassiz, 1829

Species
- See text

= Chloroscombrus =

Genus of fishes

Chloroscombrus is a genus containing two species of tropical to temperate water marine fish in the jack and horse mackerel family Carangidae. Both members are commonly known as bumpers or bumperfish, with one species endemic to the Atlantic and the other to the eastern Pacific. They have a convex ventral profile compared to most other carangids, with small oblique mouths and low dorsal and anal fins. Phylogenetic studies have found they are most closely related to the jacks of the genus Hemicaranx, with these genera plus Selar, Selaroides and possibly Alepes, making up a clade within the Caranginae subfamily. They are predatory fish which live in both inshore and offshore environments ranging from estuaries to the edge of the continental shelf, and are of moderate importance to fisheries.

== Taxonomy and phylogeny ==
Chloroscombrus is a genus containing two extant species. It is part of the jack family, Carangidae, which in turn is part of the order Carangiformes. Recent phylogenetic studies using molecular information have placed Chloroscombrus in the subfamily Caranginae (or the tribe Carangini). The most recent phylogenetic study found the genus is very closely related to Hemicaranx, with the genera Selar, Selaroides and possibly Alepes also placed in a clade within the Carangini. The study also strongly supported the monophyly of Chloroscombrus

Chloroscombrus was created by the French naturalist Charles Frédéric Girard in 1858 to accommodate a 'new' species he had described; Chloroscombrus caribbaeus, making this the original type species. For some reason, probably a lack of a type specimen for C. carribaeus, David Starr Jordan and Gilbert redesignated Micropteryx cosmopolita as the type species of Chloroscombrus, which currently remains the accepted type species. However, both these names were subsequently found to be junior synonyms of Linnaeus' Scomber chrysurus, effectively making Chloroscombrus chrysurus the type species. The name is derived from the Greek words chloros; meaning green and skombros; meaning fish, particularly mackerel.

No species pertaining to Chloroscombrus are known from the fossil record.

== Species ==
There are currently two recognized species in this genus though they may be conspecific, although no detailed study has been undertaken to prove such a relationship.:

Image	Scientific name	Common name	Distribution
	Chloroscombrus chrysurus (Linnaeus, 1766)	Atlantic bumper	From Massachusetts, south to Florida, in the Caribbean, off Bermuda, and the Gulf of Mexico. Their range continues south to the coast of Uruguay. In the eastern Atlantic, the Atlantic bumper are known from the coast of Mauritania to Angola
	Chloroscombrus orqueta D. S. Jordan & C. H. Gilbert, 1883	Pacific bumper	southern California to the Gulf of California to central Peru.

== Description ==
Both species of Chloroscombrus are small- to medium-sized fishes, growing to maximum known lengths of around 30 cm (C. orqueta) and 65 cm (C. chrysurus). The genus is easily distinguished among most of the other carangid genera, although the bigeye scad, Selar crumenophthalmus, may be confused with the Pacific member of the genus. The distinguishing features of the genus include a more convex ventral profile than the dorsal profile, giving a very rounded underside appearance, a distinct black saddle on the upper part of the caudal peduncle, a small oblique mouth and a relatively small pupil diameter. The rest of the general body plan of the genus is similar to other carangids, with two separate, rather low dorsal fins; the first consisting of 8 spines and the second of 1 spine and 25 to 29 soft rays. The anal fin is also low, consisting of 2 detached spines anteriorly, followed by 1 spine and 25 to 29 soft rays. The lateral line is moderately curved anteriorly, with six to 14 weak scutes on the straight section. The chests are completely scaled, and the jaws contain bands of fine villiform teeth. The species are silvery in colour, with the dorsal surface ranging from blue-green to dark metallic blue. C. orqueta has a distinct black spot on the upper edge of the operculum, while C. chrysurus does not. It is also known under local common name plat plat.

== Distribution and habitat ==
The two species in the genus are restricted to the tropical and temperate waters of the Atlantic and east Pacific Oceans, with C. chrysurus inhabiting both the east Americas and west African/European coasts of the Atlantic and C. orqueta inhabiting the Central American coastline of the east Pacific.

Both species are schooling coastal species, found on the continental shelf leading pelagic lifestyles. They are commonly found in shallow water environments including beaches, lagoons and estuaries. They are also rarely found in open ocean environments, commonly associated with floating objects, such as jellyfish.

== Biology and fishery ==
Both species of Chloroscombrus are predatory, taking a variety of small prey, including fish, cephalopods and zooplankton, with juveniles generally taking more planktonic prey than adults. Reproduction in the genus has been studied, as have the larval stages of both species, with juveniles often found in more oceanic waters.

No specific fishery exists for either species, although they are taken by trawls, seines and hook-and-line methods, and sold fresh, salted or frozen at market. Neither species is considered a good gamefish, although are taken by anglers occasionally, and are considered rather dry table fare.
