= Pasaleng Bay =

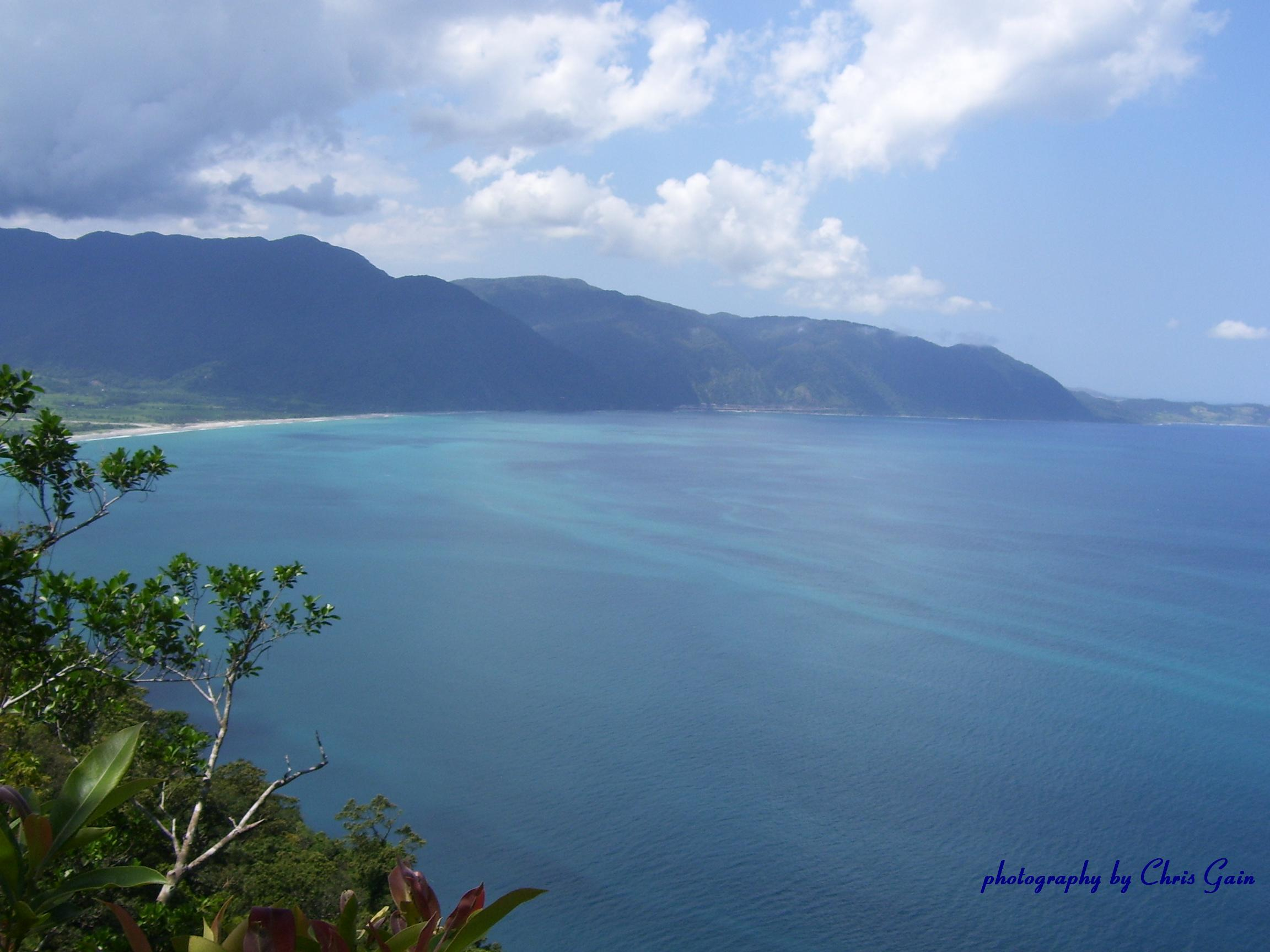
- Pasaleng Bay

- Location in Luzon Location in the Philippines
- Location: Luzon Island, Philippines
- Coordinates: 18°35′15″N 120°56′01″E
- Type: Shallow sea bay
- Settlements: Pagudpud; Santa Praxedes

Pasaleng Bay, also Paselang Bay, is a bay on the north coast of Luzon island in the Philippines. It got its name from the border village of the same name located in the town of Pagudpud in the province of Ilocos Norte.

Fishing studies have indicated that there are 319 species of marine organisms of 59 families in the bay, and 169 fishing boats are in operation.

== Geography ==
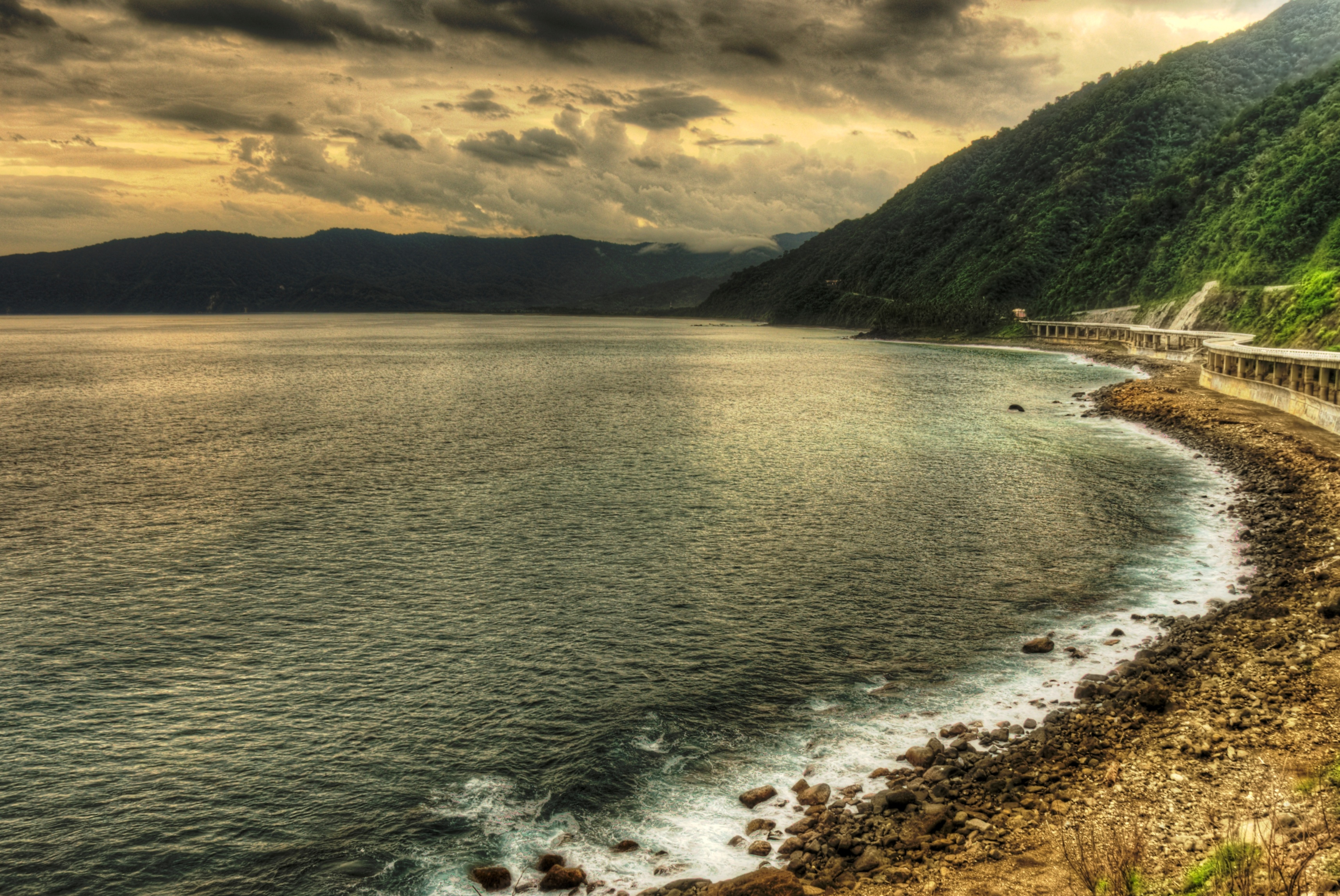
Pasaleng Bay and Patapat Viaduct

Pasaleng Bay is located 16 kilometres (9.9 mi) east of the centre of Pagudpud, Ilocos Norte. It is bounded within latitudes 18°30’ to 18°40’ north and longitudes 120°51’ and 120°60’ east. It is delimited by the China Sea to the north, the Cordillera Mountains to the east, the Adams municipality to the south and the Patapat Mountains to the west. The four river systems that flow into the bay are the Pancian River, Aqua Grande River, and the Pasaleng and Balao-i drains. Situated between Pasaleng Bay and Bangui Bay is Maira-ira Point. A village, Pasaleng, is situated at the bay's head, while Banua is nearby. The coast at Cape Bojeador trends north before it veers east towards the bay. The coastal bridge Patapat Viaduct overlooks the bay. Along the bay shore on the east, there is space for only a narrow road on the coastline.

The Patapat mountains lie between the Pasaleng bay on the east and Bangui bay to its west. They rise high above the south-western shore of Pasaleng Bay, reaching an elevation of over 4,000 feet (1,200 m), while the slopes of Caraballo (Karaballo) mountains rise from the eastern shore of the bay. The Cordillera Mountains, located in the central part of the island of Luzon, also terminate at the bay.

The bay is reported to have type II climate with distinct dry and wet seasons, akin to the Cagayan Valley. The rainy season lasts for a longer period from late May to early February whereas the dry season is very limited to late February to early May.

== Fishing ==
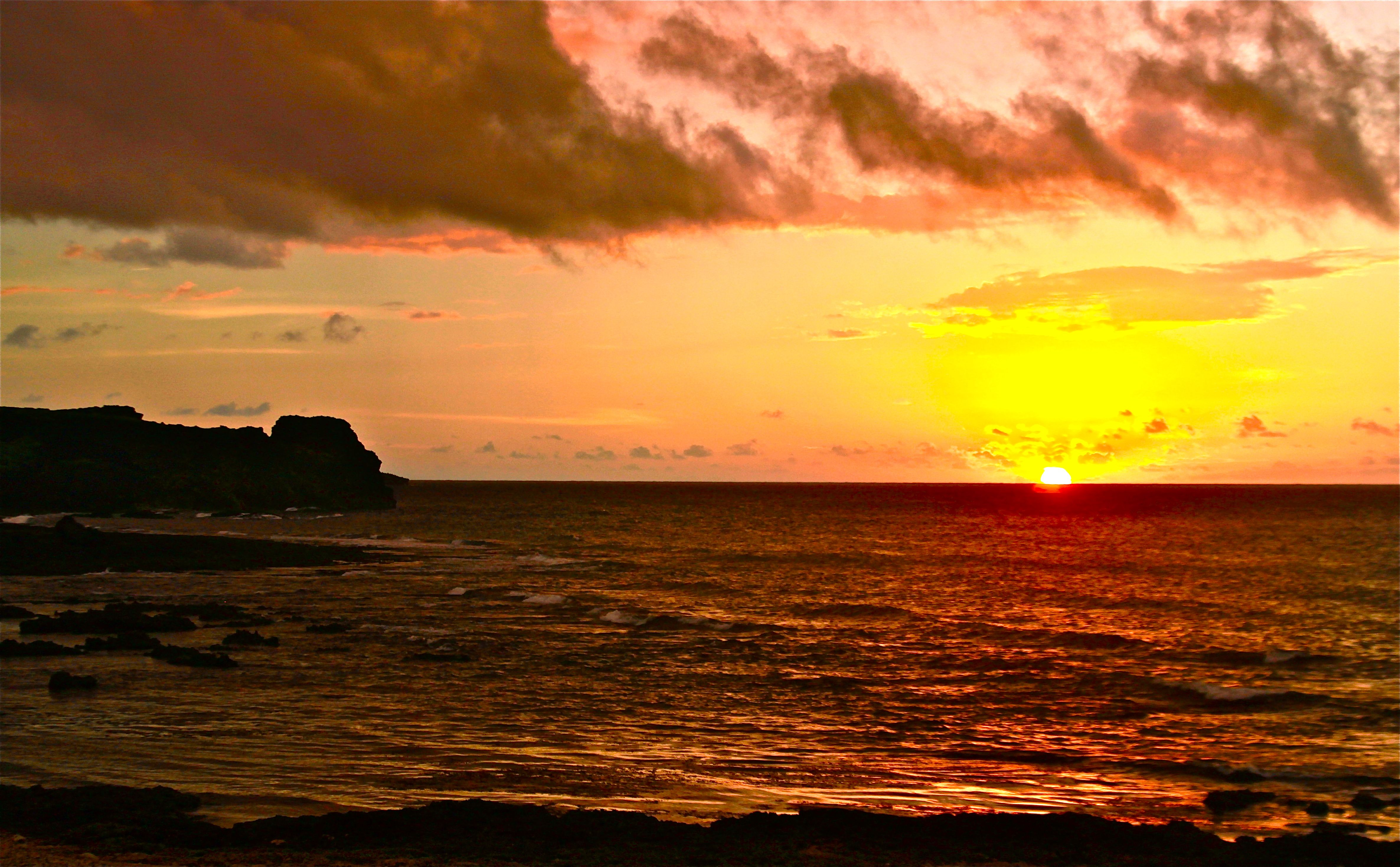
Pasaleng Bay at sunset

Fishing is an important activity in the Pasaleng Bay. The three coastal barangays where fishing is carried out are the Balao-i, Pancian and Pasaleng. It is a municipal fishing ground where 169 fishing boats operate in the bay under 91 fishing units. Most of the boats are in the capacity range of below 3 GT. There are 457 fishing gears (operated by 482 fishermen) under 16 types which operate in the bay and which are of hook and line type to the extent of 75%. From 2000 to 2006 under the National Stock Assessment Project (NSAP), 319 fish species were caught including marine organisms. They belonged to 59 families. Species of Demersal species dominated the catch with 64% of the total catch; the pelagic species contributed the rest. It consisted of 30 families of fish, 3 families of shark/rays, and 6 families of invertebrates. Specific species caught were squids, lobsters, crabs and Ranina ranina, the red frog crab. The dominant families in the order of the species that they represent are Carangidae (32 species), Serranidae (28 species), Lutjanidae (26 species), Nemipteridae (18 species), Scombridae (17 species fol owed by other families each having 15 species. The pelagic species were the most dominant in terms of catch and these in the order of their importance are skipjack tuna (Katsuwonus pelamis), bigeye scad (Selar crumenophthalmus), and frigate tuna (Auxis thazard). Among the various gears used for fishing the maximum yield was from Baby ring net, while the maximum number of species caught is credited to speargun.

== Whale watching ==
Humpback whales migrate from the cold waters of the Pacific Ocean to the warmer waters of the bay. They are regular visitors to the bay during Holy Week. Local people mention whales in their folk songs, though more so as a sighting of a ghost. They believe that their appearance ushers in a good fish catch which benefits the community. Whale watching at Pasaleng Bay is also a draw for tourists and conservationists.

== Landmark ==
Above the Pasaleng Bay, near the Mairaira Promontory between Kagayan and Hokos Norte at the foot of the Calvario Mountain there are two stone images one of an old man and the other of a woman. The place is known locally as Nagsapalan. The practice followed by sailors crossing in front of these statues is to offer a basket coconut shell filled with food and tobacco as they believe that it has spiritual powers and protects them while passing through the turbulent waters of the bay.

== Fishing industry ==
A six-year study of the fishing industry in Pasaleng Bay has been carried out during the period from 2000 to 2005 under the National Stock Assessment Project (NSAP) in the 16 coastal barangays of the municipality. The monitoring studies have indicated that there are 319 species of marine organisms of 59 families, 169 fishing boat (50% are fitted with engines) operate 457 fishing gears of 16 types and the three dominant catches in the descending order of their catch are skipjack tuna, bigeye scad and frigate tuna.
