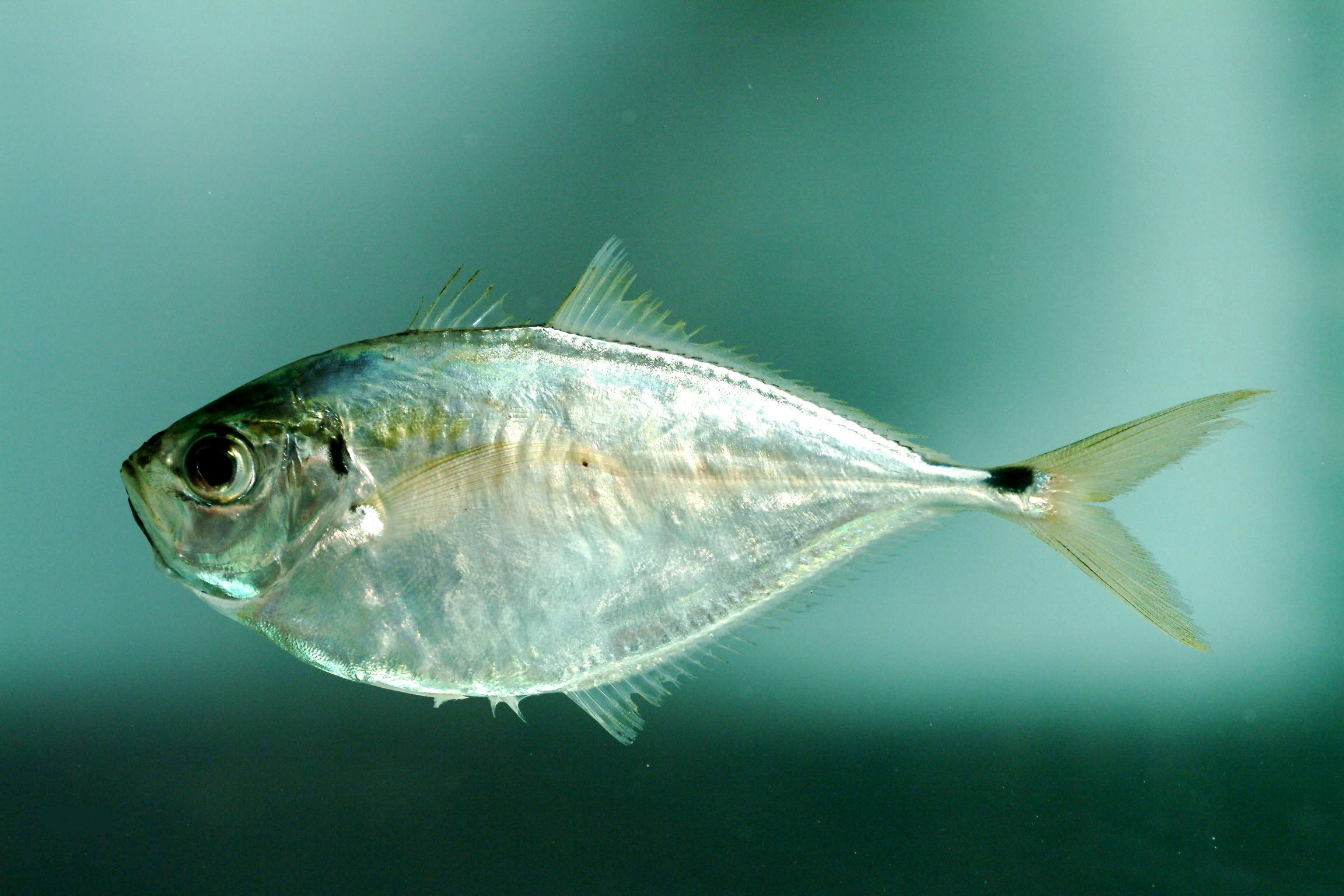

Conservation status
- Least Concern (IUCN 3.1)

Scientific classification
- Kingdom: Animalia
- Phylum: Chordata
- Class: Actinopterygii
- Order: Carangiformes
- Suborder: Carangoidei
- Family: Carangidae
- Genus: Chloroscombrus
- Species: C. chrysurus

Binomial name
- Chloroscombrus chrysurus (Linnaeus, 1766)

Synonyms
- Scomber chrysurus Linnaeus, 1766; Micropterus chrysurus (Linnaeus, 1766); Micropteryx chrysurus (Linnaeus, 1766); Scomber chloris Bloch, 1793; Seriola cosmopolita Cuvier, 1829; Micropteryx cosmopolita (Cuvier, 1829); Chloroscombrus caribbaeus Girard, 1858; Chloroscombrus ectenurus Jordan & Osgood, 1897; Chloroscombrus hesperius Fowler, 1906

= Atlantic bumper =

Species of fish

The Atlantic bumper (Chloroscombrus chrysurus) is a game fish in the family, Carangidae. It was first described by the "father of modern taxonomy", Carl Linnaeus in the book, Systema Naturae. Atlantic bumper are known to eat smaller fish, cephalopods, and zooplankton.

== Description ==
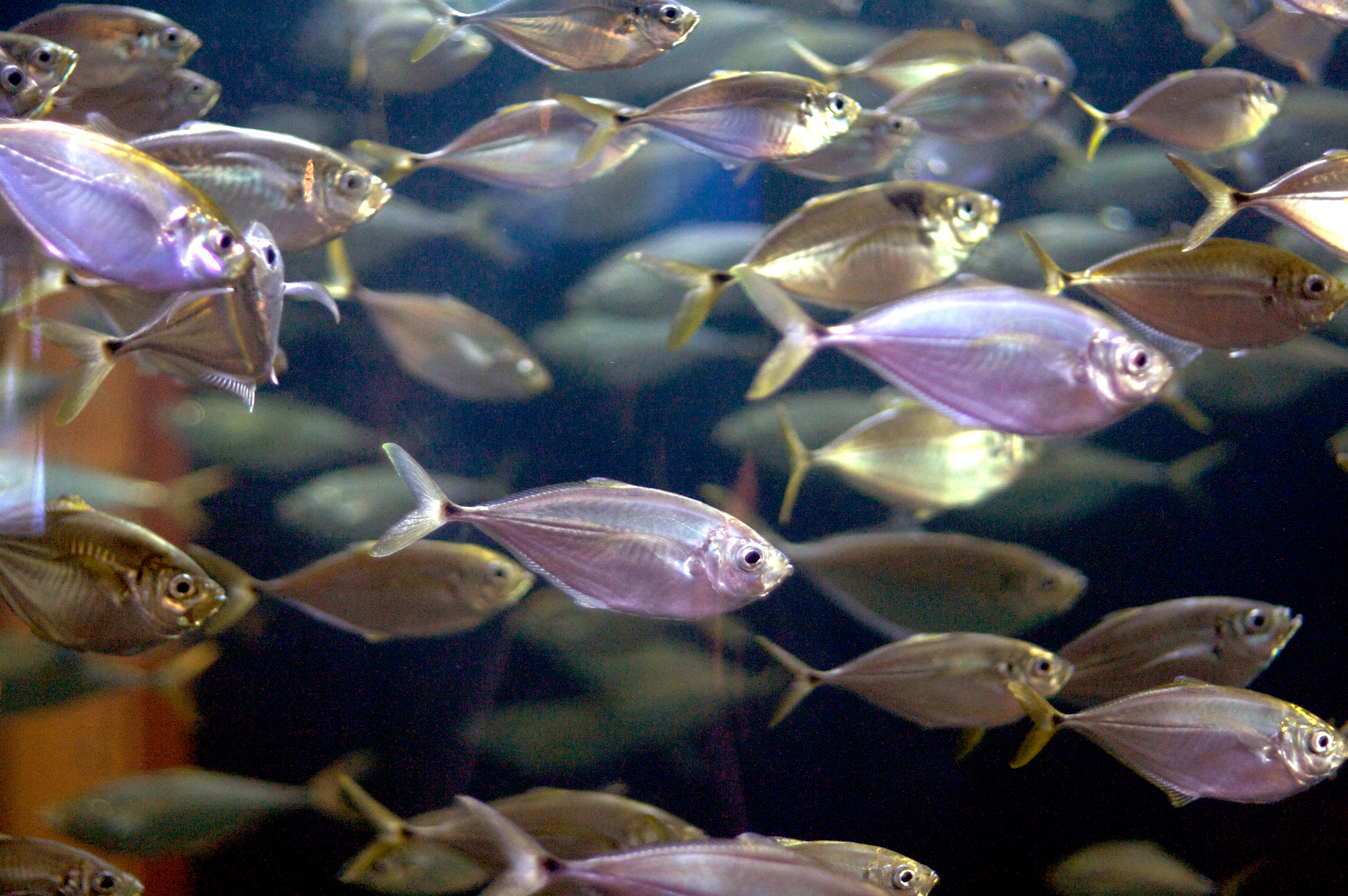
Shoaling Atlantic bumper in an aquarium.

The Atlantic bumper is best recognized by its profile, the bottom being much more curved than the top. Also, the lateral line is arched near the head. Atlantic bumper are generally described as silver to golden colored, with golden yellow on the anal and caudal fins, which have 3 spines, 25–28 rays and 9 spines, 25–28 rays, respectively. There is an obvious black saddle-shaped blotch on the caudal peduncle and a similar patch near the edge of the opercle.

Although the average size of Atlantic bumper is 25 centimetres (9.8 in), the largest recorded Atlantic bumper was 65 centimetres (26 in) long.

== Distribution and habitat ==
In the western Atlantic, Atlantic bumper is found from Massachusetts, to south Brazil. They are known to be found off Bermuda, in the Caribbean, and the Gulf of Mexico. Their range continues south to the coast of Uruguay. In the eastern Atlantic, the Atlantic bumper are known from the coast of Mauritania to Angola. One single record was reported in the Mediterranean Sea off Spain in 1997. They are not found in the eastern Pacific although a visually similar species, Chloroscombrus orqueta, or the Pacific bumper is ranged for that area. Little is known about how these two species relate to each other, and they may represent only one species.

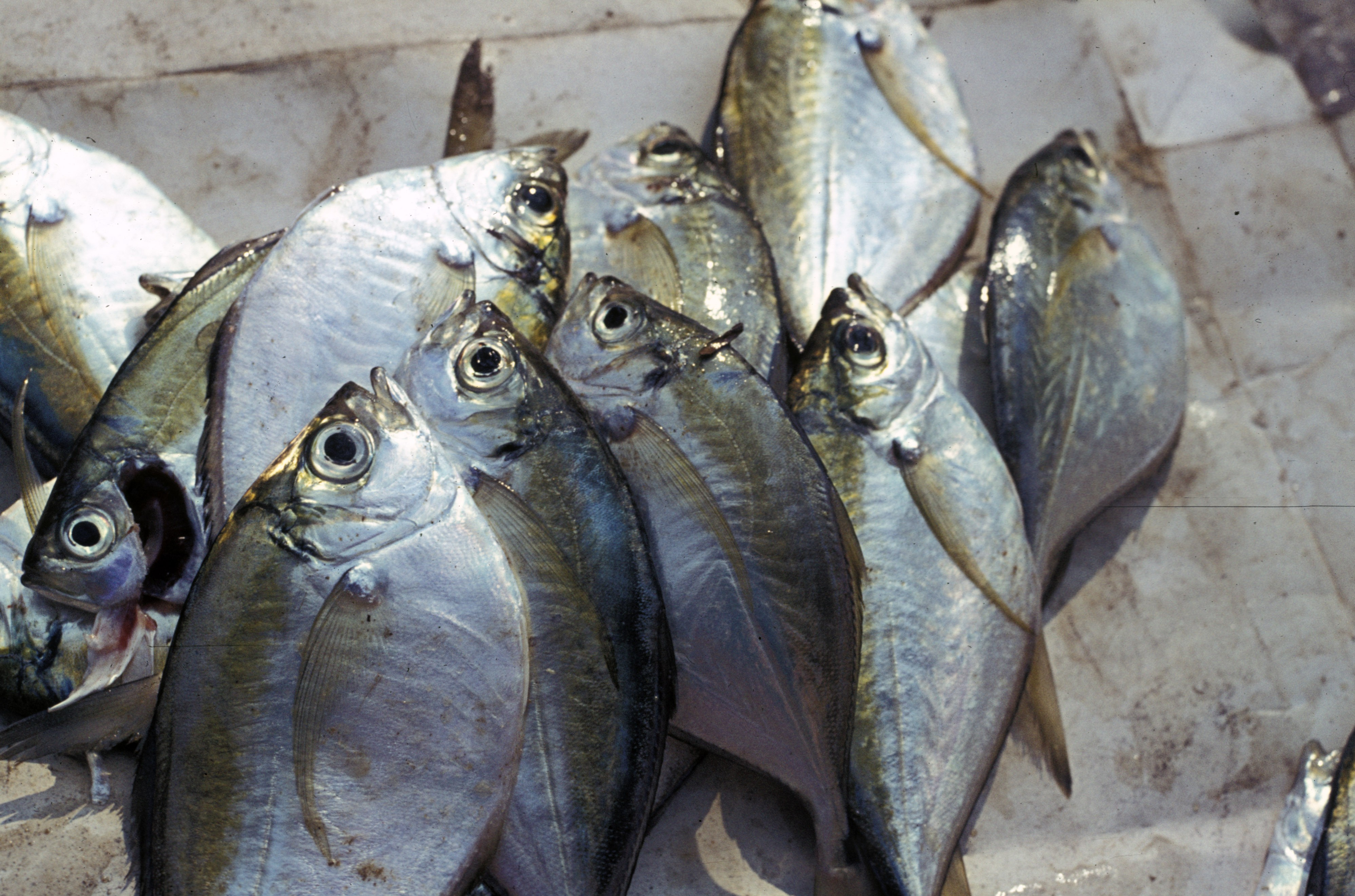
Atlantic bumper caught in Cameroon.

The Atlantic bumper is found in subtropical waters up to 55 m in depth. They usually dwell near soft bottoms of the continental shelf, but have been observed schooling near the surface. While it is primarily a salt water fish, juveniles have been found in brackish estuaries.
