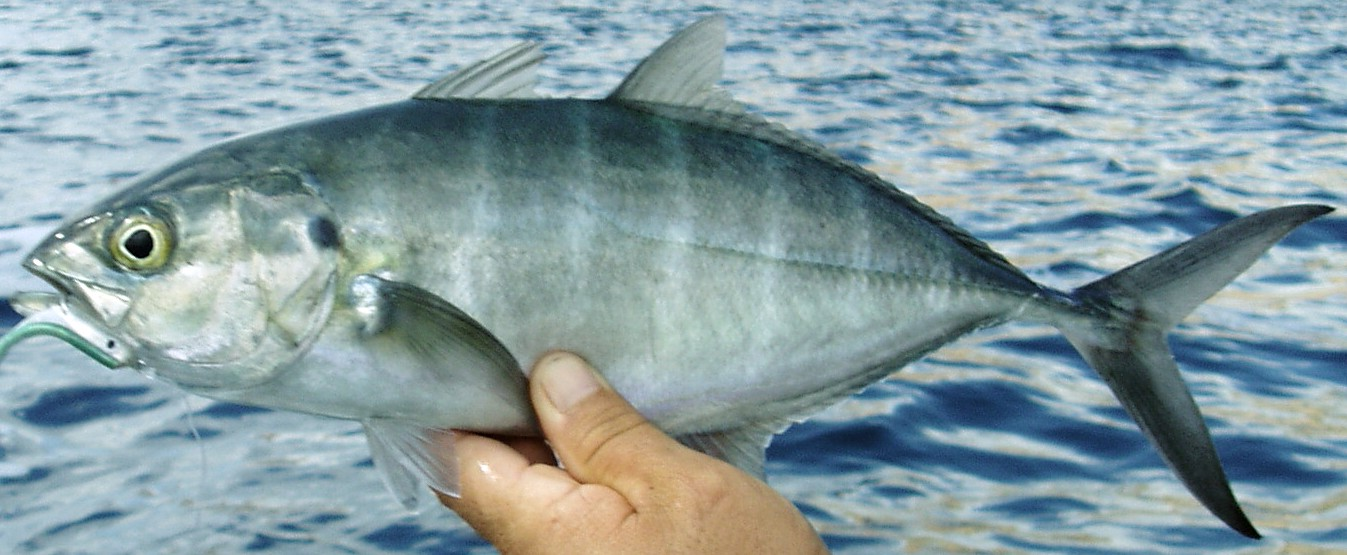

Conservation status
- Least Concern (IUCN 3.1)

Scientific classification
- Kingdom: Animalia
- Phylum: Chordata
- Class: Actinopterygii
- Order: Carangiformes
- Suborder: Carangoidei
- Family: Carangidae
- Genus: Caranx
- Species: C. caballus

Binomial name
- Caranx caballus Günther, 1868
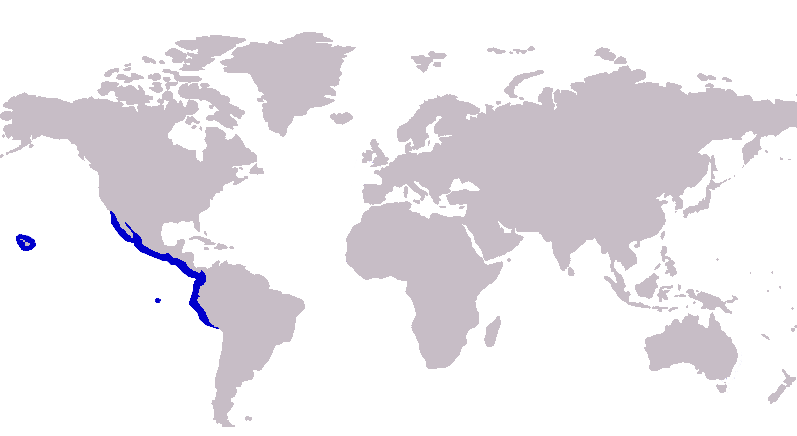
- Approximate range of the green jack

Synonyms
- Trachurus boops Girard, 1858; Caranx girardi Steindachner, 1870; Carangoides caballus (Günther, 1868)

= Green jack =

Species of fish

The green jack (Caranx caballus), also known as the horse jack, is an abundant species of coastal marine fish in the jack family Carangidae. The species is distributed in the eastern Pacific Ocean along the American coastline from Santa Cruz Island off California in the north to Peru in the south, as well as a number of islands including the Galapagos and recently, Hawaii. The green jack is distinguished from other similar carangid species by a number of features including gill raker and lateral line scale counts, and the presence of an adipose eyelid. It is a moderately large species, growing to at least 55 cm in length and 2.81 kg, although unconfirmed reports suggest a much larger maximum size. It lives in a wide range of continental shelf environments including estuaries, bays, reefs and offshore seamounts, living both pelagically and demersally. The green jack is a predatory species, preying on a variety of fish, crustaceans and cephalopods, as well as zooplankton. Most fish are sexually mature by the time they attain 38 cm, with spawning occurring between May and October. The species is of high importance to fisheries throughout its range, caught by pelagic trawls, a variety of netting methods and hook and line. The green jack is also of interest to anglers, taken by bait and lures, although is considered to only be fair in eating quality.

== Taxonomy and naming ==
The green jack is formally classified within the genus Caranx, one of a number of groups of fish referred to as jacks and trevallies. Caranx is further classified in the family Carangidae, part of the order Carangiformes.

The species was first scientifically described by the French biologist Charles Frédéric Girard in 1858, who named the species Trachurus boops, placing the species in the horse mackerel genus based on the holotype taken off of San Diego, California. With the instability of carangid taxonomy at the time, the species was reassigned to a number of genera, including Caranx, which created a taxonomic homonym with the Caranx boops described by Georges Cuvier in 1833. In 1868, British zoologist Albert Günther unaware of the prior naming independently renamed the species Caranx caballus based on specimens collected from Panama, one of which was designated to be the holotype. The species was further renamed in 1870 by Franz Steindachner, who attempted to remove the Caranx boops homonym by simply renaming the species Caranx girardi. Later reviews of the Carangidae revealed this synonymy, and due to Gunther's' earlier naming, his species name was kept and attributed to him, while Cuvier's' Caranx boops was later moved to Selar boops. The specific name caballus is Latin for 'horse', reflecting the common name of horse mackerel given to this and many similar species at the time. William Smith-Vaniz has suggested the possibility C. caballus is conspecific with a very similar Atlantic species; Caranx crysos, but no studies into this relationship have been undertaken. Its position in the genus Caranx has also been questioned recently by John Randall due to its unusual dentition. The common name 'green jack' is in reference to the species' common coloration, while 'horse jack' is derived from the Latin name. In Spanish-speaking nations, it is often known under broadly applied names including cocinero and caballa.

== Description ==
The green jack is moderately large in size, growing to a maximum confirmed length of 55 cm and 2.81 kg in weight. Unconfirmed reports indicate the species may grow much larger; up to 1 m in size, but it is most commonly seen at lengths below 40 cm. The green jack is morphologically similar to a number of other carangids, having an elongated, moderately compressed fusiform body with dorsal and ventral profiles of approximately equal convexity and a slightly pointed snout. The posterior section of the eye is covered by a moderately well developed adipose eyelid, and the posterior extremity of the jaw is vertically under the center of the eye. The dorsal fin is in two parts, the first consisting of 8 spines and the second of 1 spine followed by 22 to 25 soft rays. The anal fin consists of 2 anteriorly detached spines followed by 1 spine and 16 to 21 soft rays. The lobes of both the second dorsal and anal fin are slightly elongated and almost entirely covered in small scales, but are still much shorter than the head length. The lateral line has a pronounced but short anterior arch, with the curved section intersecting the straight section below the spine of the second dorsal fin. The straight section contains 0 to 7 scales followed by 42 to 56 very strong scutes, and 43 to 47 scales overall. The chest is completely scaled. The upper jaw contains an irregular series of outer canines with an inner band of small, regularly spaced teeth, while the lower jaw contains a single band of small teeth. The species has 40 to 45 gill rakers in total; 10 to 15 on the upper limb and 27 to 30 on the lower limb, with this the only feature that differs between C. caballus and C. crysos. There are 25 vertebrae present.

In life, the green jack has a greenish blue colour overall, with an olive green to dark blue back and a golden to grey coloured belly, with a distinct back blotch on the outer edge of the operculum. Individuals in schools often have a very evident pearly white marking near this black blotch. Juveniles have 7 dark vertical stripes on their flanks which fade with age. The caudal fin is grey with dark tips, with all other fins being light grey to hyaline in colour.

== Distribution and habitat ==
The green jack is distributed throughout the coastal waters of the tropical and subtropical waters of the eastern Pacific Ocean. Its range extends along the coast of the Americas from Santa Cruz Island, California, south through Mexico and Central America, and down to Peru. The species also inhabits a number of offshore islands including the Galápagos Islands. The species had been captured on occasion from the Hawaiian Islands since 1923, but was misidentified until William Smith-Vaniz re-examined the specimens in 1981 and identified them as Caranx caballus. Due to the heavy fishing pressures throughout Hawaii and the rarity of captures, it was concluded these few individuals were strays carried by ocean currents from the eastern Pacific, as these were the only known specimens. In 1998 however, the species appeared in fishermen's catches in large numbers, and has ever since, indicating a population has been established in the island chain.

The green jack inhabits a variety of continental shelf environments to a depth of at least 100 m, predominantly inshore reef systems, as well as shallow bays, estuaries and lagoons. It leads both a demersal and pelagic lifestyle, forming large schools which can move large distances offshore, allowing them to reach offshore island as well as deep, isolated seamounts.

== Biology ==
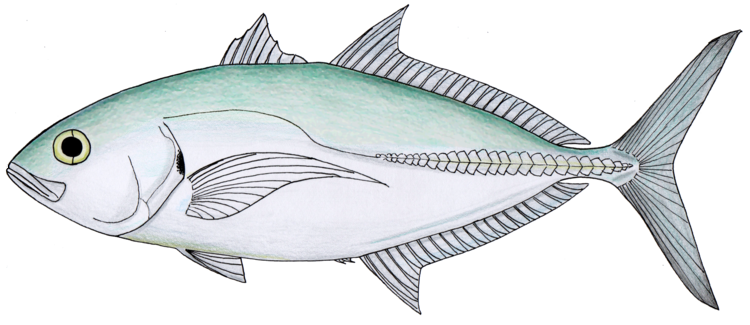
Illustration of the green jack

The green jack is a gregarious species, forming moderately large schools of fish in the marine environment. Smaller shoals are formed by juveniles when entering shallower waters including bays and estuaries. The species is predatory in nature, taking small fish, cephalopods, crabs, shrimps and other crustaceans, either in midwater or on the sea floor. Green jack are also known to consume zooplankton, especially in deeper waters around islands and seamounts where the plankton is aggregated. Throughout its range, the species is one of the most abundant species, making it an important part of the ecology, not only as a predator but as prey. It is known to be taken by larger fish such as marlin and sharks, as well a variety of other animals.

Reproduction in the species has been quite well studied, with the commercial value of the species having led to a number of growth and population dynamics studies being undertaken. Spawning appears to take place from May to October, with peaks in June and October. Larval growth has been extensive described, with the larvae identifiable by their pigmentation pattern and meristic count of 25 vertebrae. The body shape of early larvae resembles that of Chloroscombrus orquetu, however, differences in pigmentation, particularly on the dorsal body margin, differentiate the species Studies off the coast of Mexico have found the larvae tend to occur in deeper waters than most other carangid larvae inhabit, from 90 to 100 m depth, possibly indicating spawning occurs in deeper waters. Otolith studies indicate that both the females and males grow at the same rate; 16.82 cm after the first year, 27.78 after the second, 34.66 after the third, with modelling suggesting the maximum length of 55 cm is reached at around 8 years of age. Most individuals reach sexual maturity before they reach 38 cm in length. Juveniles tend to move to protected waters such as estuaries, moving to deeper waters at adulthood.

== Relationship to humans ==
The green jack is one of the most abundant species of fish within its range, and as such is quite important to fisheries throughout its range. It is taken by pelagic trawls, inshore gill nets, purse nets, and seines, as well as hook and line gear. Catch statistics are not kept for the fish throughout most of its range; however, the Mexican state of Colima is one exception. Records from 1980 onward show a catch between 9 and 250 tons, with an average of 93 tons, with the catch best between September and December. Like most carangid species in the area, it is considered a lower class product, fetching between US$ 0.50 and 0.80 per kilogram, making it accessible to the low-income population. The fish are sold both for consumption and as bait, either fresh, smoked or salted. Some hope the Hawaiian population becomes commercially viable in the future, as they are often landed in other carangid catches at the present.

The green jack is also of modest interest to anglers in the region, with the species a good light-tackle fish. Lures are most often used on the species, including jigs, spoons, and squids, although baits of live fish and strip baits work equally as well. The IGFA all tackle world record for the species stands at 2.81 kg (6 lb 3oz) caught off of Cabo San Lucas, Mexico in 2000.
