= Patapat Viaduct =

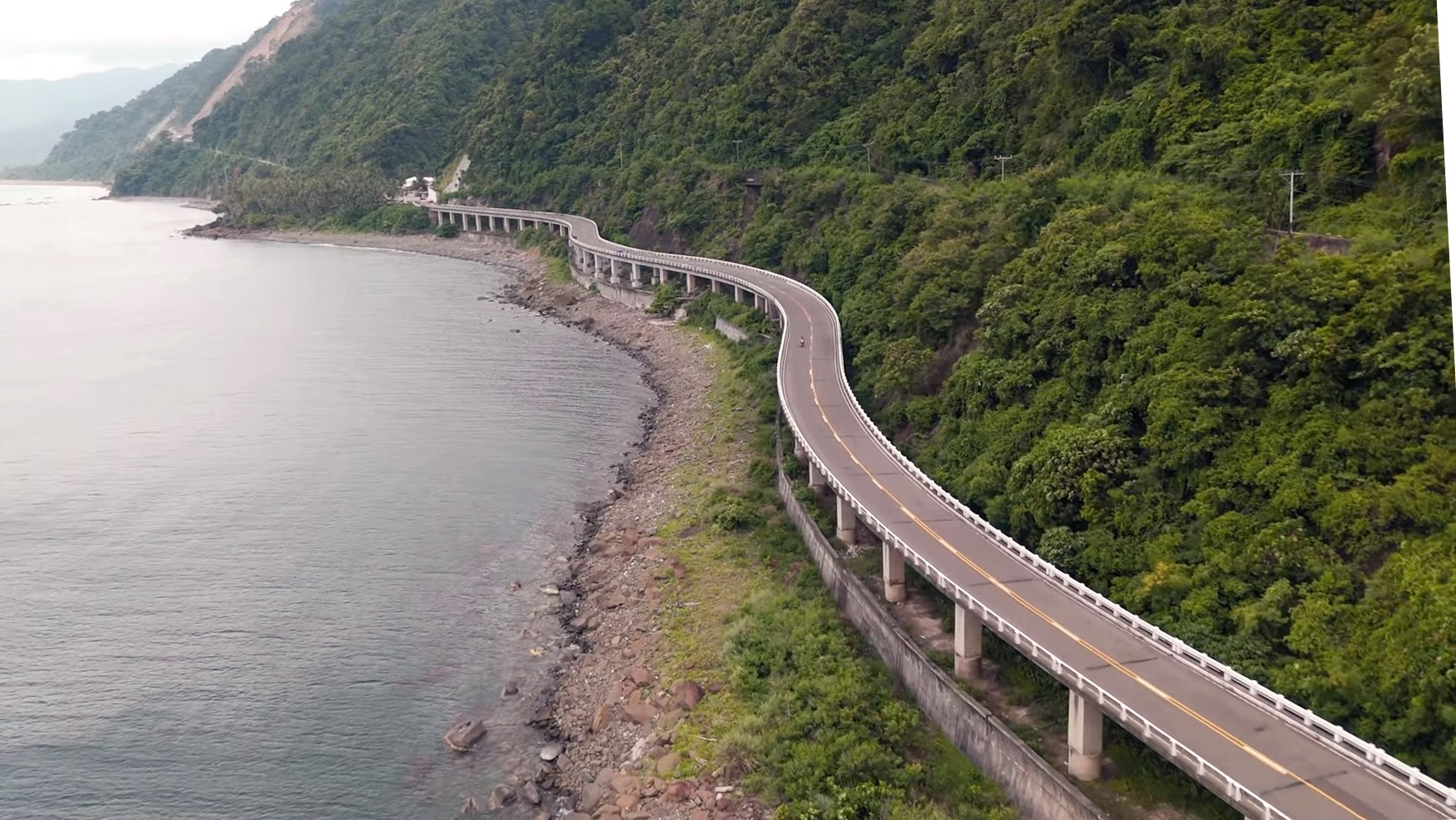
- Coordinates: 18°34′31″N 120°53′43″E
- Carries: AH 26 (N1) (Manila North Road)
- Crosses: Pasaleng Bay
- Locale: Pagudpud, Ilocos Norte
- Official name: Patapat Viaduct
- Maintained by: Department of Public Works and Highways

Characteristics
- Design: Viaduct
- Material: Concrete
- Total length: 1.3 km (0.81 mi)
- Width: 9.42 m (30.9 ft)
- Height: 31 m (102 ft)
- No. of spans: 76
- Load limit: 15 t (15,000 kg)
- No. of lanes: Two-lane single carriageway (one lane per direction)
- Design life: 45 years

History
- Constructed by: Hanil Development Co. Ltd.
- Opened: October 1986

Location
- Interactive map of Patapat Viaduct

The Patapat Viaduct, also known as the Patapat Bridge, is a viaduct in Pagudpud, Ilocos Norte, a coastal resort town in the northernmost tip of the island of Luzon in the Philippines.

The bridge is elevated 31 meters (102 ft) over sea level. It is a concrete coastal bridge 1.3 kilometers (0.81 mi) long, 9.42 meters (30.9 ft) wide, and connects the Maharlika Highway and the MacArthur Highway from the Ilocos Region to Cagayan Valley. The viaduct was constructed by Hanil Development Co. Ltd. under the overall management of DPWH-PMO-PJHK and was completed and opened to traffic in October 1986. It rises along the town's coastal mountains, which is the starting point of the Cordillera Mountain Range that snakes through Northern Luzon. It is the 4th longest bridge in the Philippines.
