= Selar =

Selar may refer to:

- Selar (fish), a genus of fishes in the family Carangidae
- Dr. Selar, a character in the television series Star Trek: The Next Generation
