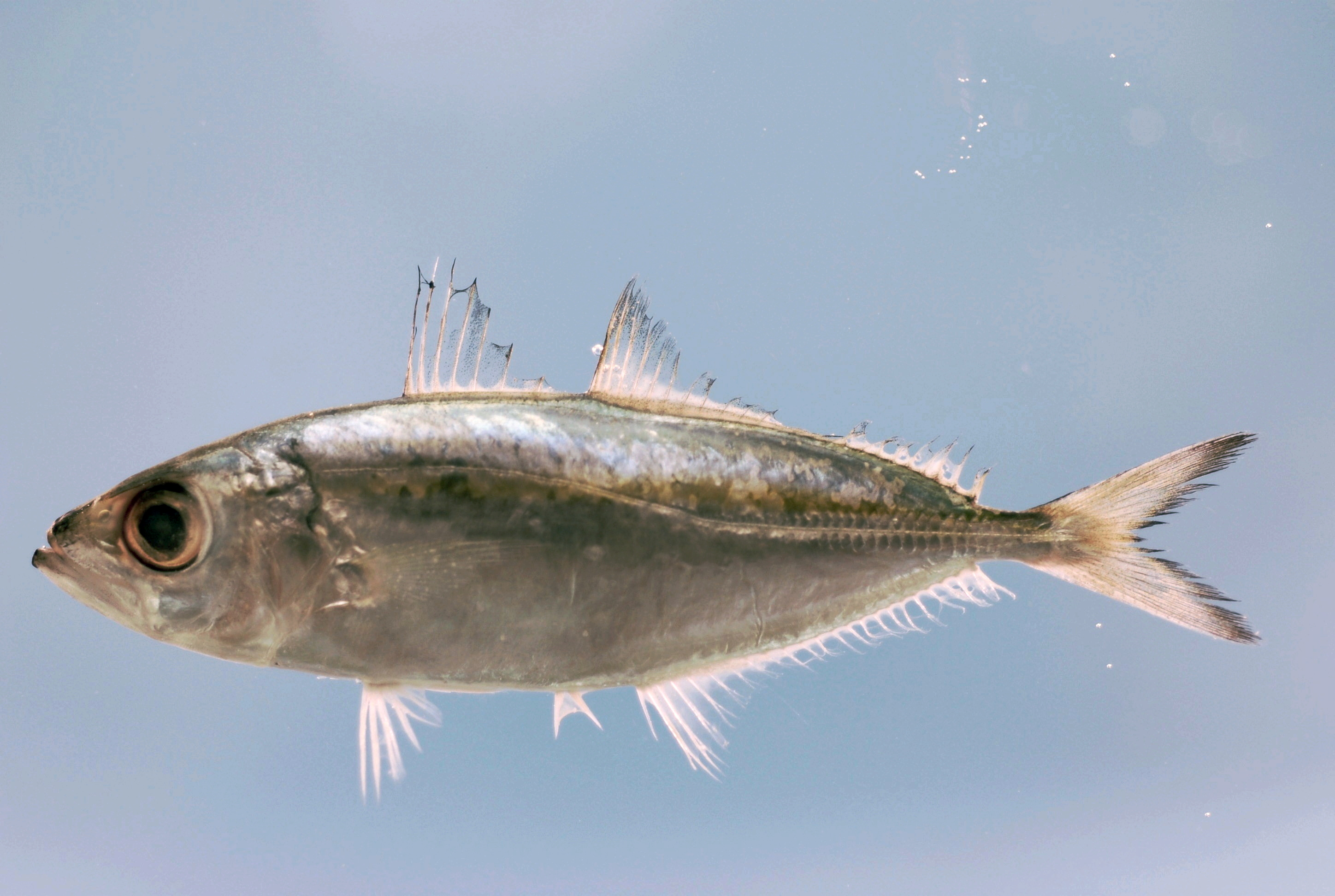

Conservation status
- Least Concern (IUCN 3.1)

Scientific classification
- Kingdom: Animalia
- Phylum: Chordata
- Class: Actinopterygii
- Division: Teleostei
- Order: Carangiformes
- Suborder: Carangoidei
- Family: Carangidae
- Genus: Selar
- Species: S. crumenophthalmus

Binomial name
- Selar crumenophthalmus (Bloch, 1793)

Synonyms
- Scomber crumenophthalmus Bloch, 1793; Caranx crumenophthalmus (Bloch, 1793); Scomber plumieri Bloch, 1793; Scomber balantiophthalmus Bloch & Schneider, 1801; Caranx daubentonii Lacépède, 1801; Caranx mauritianus Quoy & Gaimard , 1825; Caranx macrophthalmus Rüppell, 1830; Caranx novaeguineae Cuvier, 1833; Caranx torvus Jenyns, 1841; Trachurops brachychirus Gill, 1862; Trachurops crumenophthalmus crockeri Nichols, 1935; Caranx ature Curtiss, 1938

= Bigeye scad =

Species of ray-finned fish

The bigeye scad or big-eyed scad (Selar crumenophthalmus) is a species of marine ray-finned fish belonging to the family Carangidae, which includes the amderjacks, trevallies and kingfishes. This fish is found in tropical regions around the globe. Other common names include purse-eyed scad, goggle-eyed scad, akule, chicharro, charrito ojón, jacks, matang baka, mushimas and coulirou. The bigeye scad is fished commercially, both for human consumption and for bait.

== Taxonomy ==
The bigeye scad was first formally described as Scomber crumenophthalmus in 1793 by the German doctor and naturalist Marcus Elieser Bloch with its type locality given as Acara in Ghana. This species is now regarded as one of two species which constitute the genus Selar, the other being its type species the oxeye scad (Selar boops). The genus Selar is classified in the subfamily Caranginae, the trevallies, kingfishes and related species, which is part of the family Carangidae, the mackerel amberjacks, in the suborder Carangoidei in the order Carangiformes.

== Etymology ==
The bigeye scad is one of two species in the genus Selar, a local name for the oxeye scad in Batavia, Java. The specific name, crumenophthalmus, combines crumena, which means a "leather money purse", with opthalmos, which means "eye". This is an allusion to the eye being almost completely covered by the adipose eyelid except for a narrow slit located over the pupil, this resembles an 18th century purse.

== Description ==
The bigeye scad has an fusiform body with a compressed cross section which reaches a maximum total length of 70 cm (28 in). The dorsal fin is supported by 9 spines and between 24 and 27 soft rays, the anal fin contains 3 spines and 21-23 soft rays. This species is metallic blue to bluish green on the upper body, fading to white on the lower body, there may be a yellow stripe running from the margin of the operculum to the upper part of the base of the caudal fin.

== Distribution and habitat ==
The bigeye scad is a circumtropical distribution, in the Atlantic it has been recorded as far north as Nova Scotia and is found as far south as Rio de Janeiro, in the eastern Atlantic it is found from Cape Verde south to Angola, including Ascension Island. It occurs from the coast of Eastern Africa through the Indian Ocean into the Pacific as far north as southern Japan and Hawaii, south to New Caledonia and Australia. It also occurs in the Eastern Pacific from Baja California south to Peru, including the Galapagos Islands. The adults show a preferemce for clear oceanic waters in the vicinity of islands and in the open ocean, they occasionally occur in turbid waters. They are found at depths down to 170 m (560 ft).

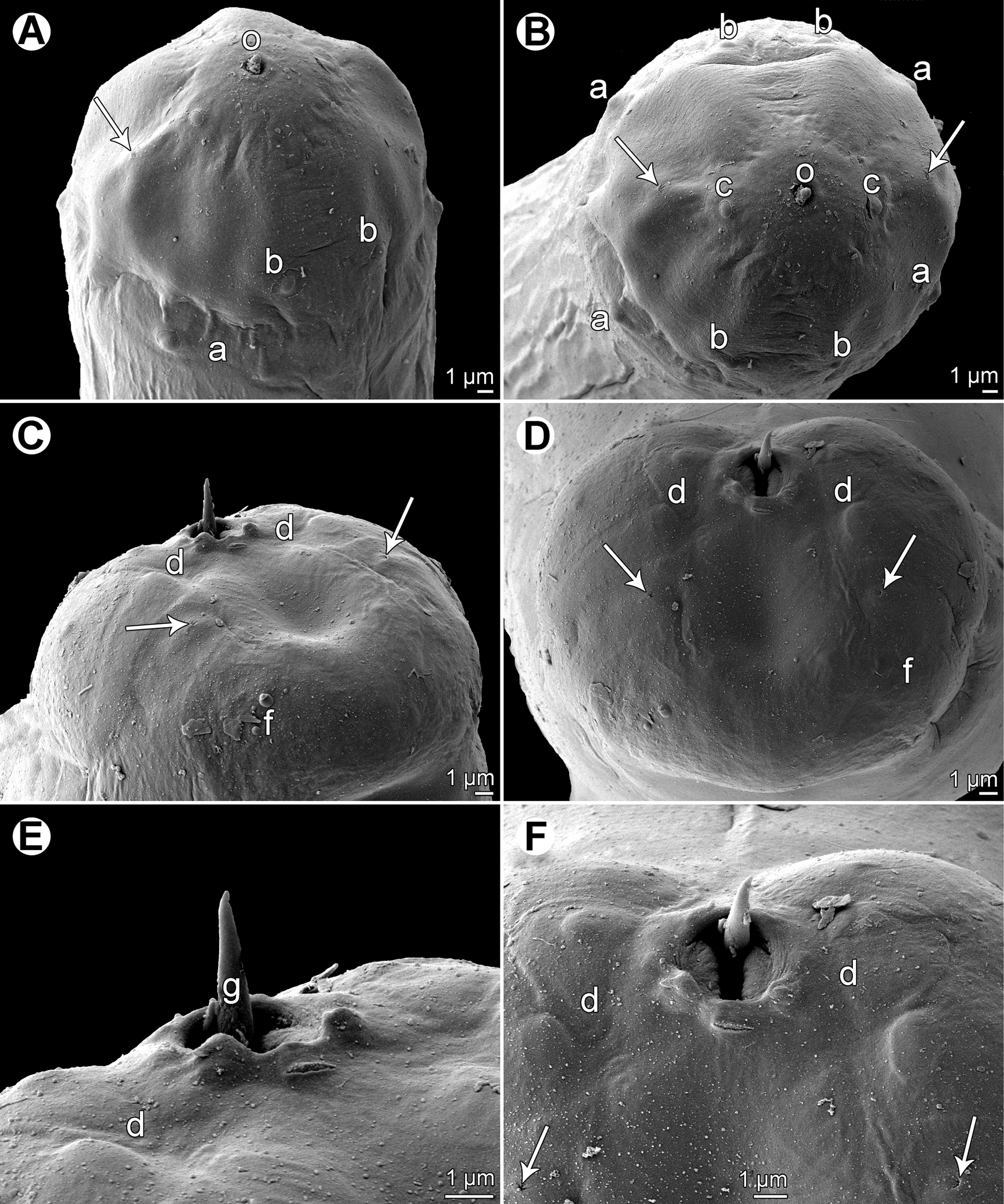
Philometra selaris (Nematoda, Philometridae), a parasite of the ovary of the bigeye scad. SEM.

== Biology ==
The bigeye scad forms large shoals typically in shallow inshore waters, as well as over shallow reefs or sometimes in turbid water. This species will associate with whale sharks (Rhincodon typus). It is a mostly nocturnal feeder, the adults feeding on large zooplankton while the juveniles feed mainly on smaller crustaceans, such as krill or shrimp. The adults are also active predators of fish larvae and early juveniles. The large eyes may be an adaptation to hunting at night.

== Parasites ==
Parasites of the bigeye scad include the philometrid nematode Philometra selaris, which lives inside the ovary of the females.

== Uses ==
Global capture production of Bigeye scad (Selar crumenophthalmus) in thousand tonnes from 1950 to 2022, as reported by the FAO

The bigeye scad are fished commercially; the global catches are about 200 thousand tonnes per year. They are highly valued as food in Asian and Pacific cultures. In Maldivian cuisine it is known as mushimas and commonly eaten in garudhiya or fried. In Florida and the Caribbean, they are popular as bait, and in Tokelau in the tuna fishery.
