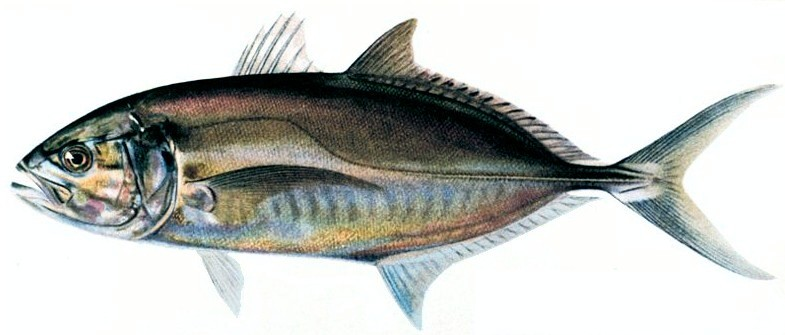

Conservation status
- Least Concern (IUCN 3.1)

Scientific classification
- Kingdom: Animalia
- Phylum: Chordata
- Class: Actinopterygii
- Division: Teleostei
- Order: Carangiformes
- Suborder: Carangoidei
- Family: Carangidae
- Genus: Caranx
- Species: C. crysos

Binomial name
- Caranx crysos (Mitchill, 1815)
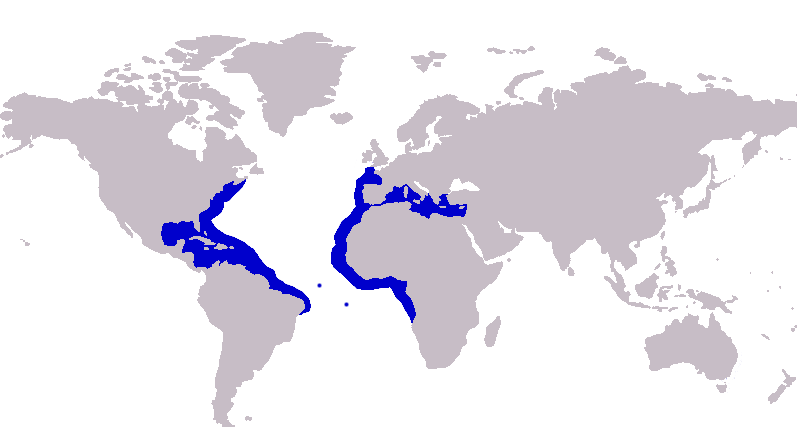
- Approximate range of the blue runner

Synonyms
- List: Scomber crysos Mitchill, 1815; Carangoides crysos (Mitchill, 1815); Paratractus crysos (Mitchill, 1815); Caranx fusus Geoffroy Saint-Hilaire, 1817; Carangoides fusus (Geoffroy Saint-Hilaire, 1817); Caranx pisquetus Cuvier, 1833; Trachurus squamosus Gronow, 1854

= Blue runner =

Species of fish

The blue runner (Caranx crysos), also known as the bluestripe jack, Egyptian scad, hardtail jack, or hardnose, is a common species of moderately large marine fish classified in the jack family, Carangidae. The blue runner is distributed across the Atlantic Ocean, ranging from Brazil to Canada in the western Atlantic and from Angola to Great Britain including the Mediterranean in the east Atlantic. The blue runner is distinguished from similar species by several morphological features, including the extent of the upper jaw, gill raker count, and lateral line scale counts. The blue runner is known to reach a maximum length of 70 cm and 5.05 kg in weight, but is much more common below 35 cm. The species inhabits both inshore and offshore environments, predominantly over reefs, but it is known to congregate around large, man-made, offshore structures such as oil platforms. Juveniles tend to inhabit shallower reef and lagoon waters, before moving to deeper waters as adults.

The blue runner is a schooling, predatory fish, predominantly taking fish in inshore environments, as well as various crustaceans and other invertebrates. Fish living offshore feed nearly exclusively on zooplankton. The species reaches sexual maturity between 225 and 280 mm across its range, with spawning occurring offshore year-round, although this peaks during the warmer months. Larvae and juveniles live pelagically, often under sargassum mats or jellyfish until they move inshore. The blue runner is of high importance to fisheries, with an annual catch between 6000 and 7000 tonnes taken from the Americas in the last five years. The species is also a light-tackle gamefish, taking baits, lures, and flies, but is often used as bait itself, being a mediocre table fish. Some suggest that the eastern Pacific species Caranx caballus, the green jack, may be conspecific with C. crysos, although this currently remains unresolved.

== Taxonomy and etymology ==
The blue runner is classified within the genus Caranx, one of a number of groups known as the jacks or trevallies. Caranx itself is part of the larger jack and horse mackerel family Carangidae, part of the order Carangiformes.

The species was first scientifically described by American ichthyologist Samuel L. Mitchill in 1815, based on a specimen taken from the waters of New York Bay, USA, which was designated to be the holotype. He named the species Scomber crysos and suggested a common name of 'yellow mackerel', with the specific epithet reflecting this, meaning "gold" in Greek. The taxon has been variably placed in either Caranx, Carangoides or Paratractus, but is now considered valid as Caranx crysos. The species has been independently redescribed three times, first as Caranx fusus, which is still incorrectly used by some authors (occasionally as Carangoides fusus), and later as Caranx pisquetus and Trachurus squamosus. These names are considered invalid junior synonyms under ICZN rules. The species has many common names, with the most common being blue runner. Other, less commonly used names include bluestripe jack, Egyptian scad, hardtail jack, hardnose, white-back cavalli, yellow-tail cavalli, and a variety of broad names such as mackerel, runner, and crevalle.

The blue runner may be conspecific with the eastern Pacific species Caranx caballus (green jack), although no specific studies have been undertaken to examine this relationship. Both species were included in a recent genetic analysis of the entire family Carangidae, with results showing both species are very closely related, although the authors did not comment on genetic distance between the two.

== Description ==
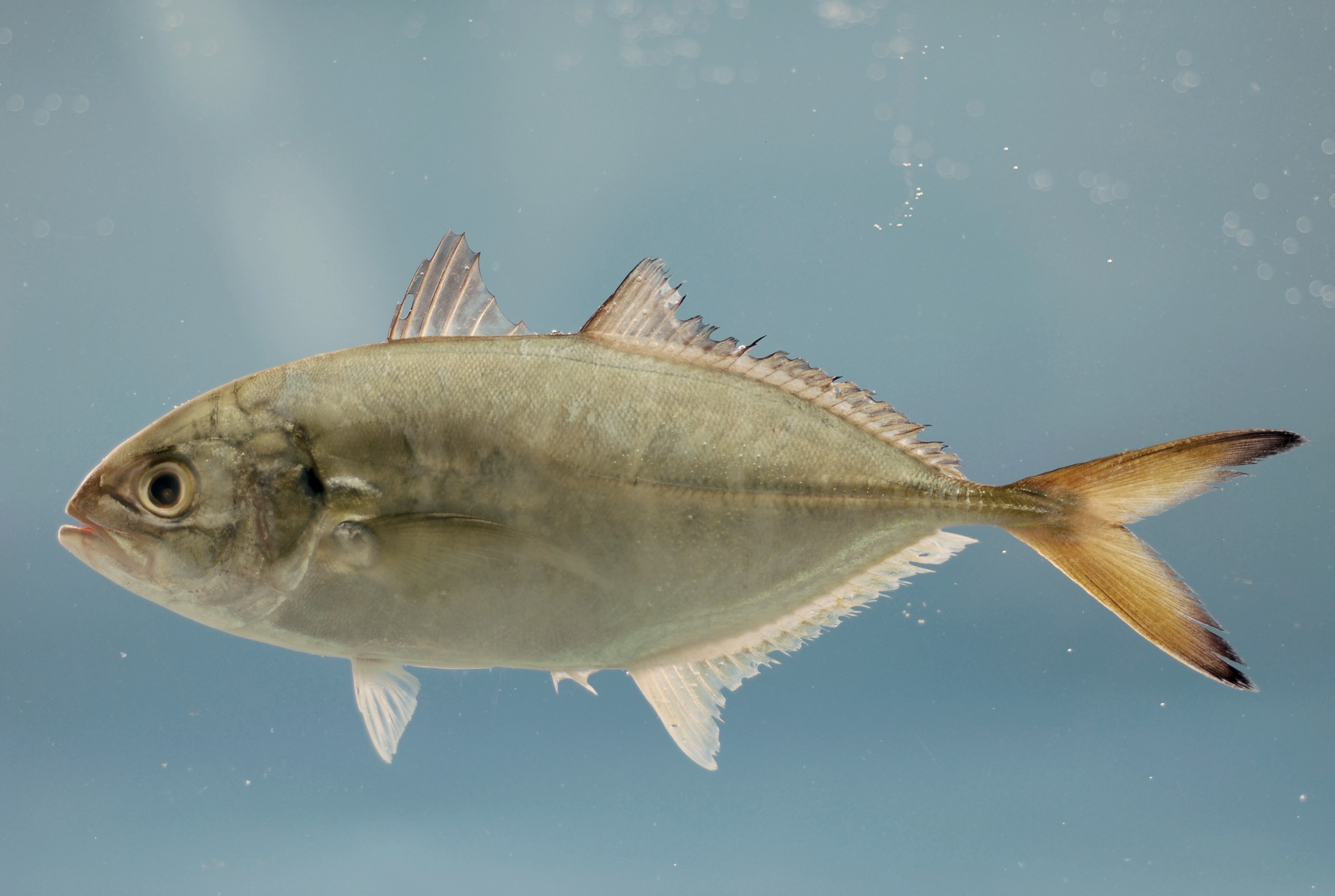
A small blue runner in profile

The blue runner is moderately large in size, growing to a maximum confirmed length of 70 cm and 5.05 kg in weight, but is more common at lengths less than 35 cm. The blue runner is morphologically similar to a number of other carangids, having an elongated, moderately compressed body with dorsal and ventral profiles of approximately equal convexity and a slightly pointed snout. The posterior section of the eye is covered by a moderately well developed adipose eyelid, and the posterior extremity of the jaw is vertically under the center of the eye. The dorsal fin is in two parts, the first consisting of eight spines and the second of one spine followed by 22 to 25 soft rays. The anal fin consists of two anteriorly detached spines followed by one spine and 19 to 21 soft rays. The pectoral fins become more falcated with age, having 21 to 23 rays, and are slightly longer than the head. The lateral line has a pronounced but short anterior arch, with the curved section intersecting the straight section below the spine of the second dorsal fin. The straight section contains from none up to seven scales followed by 46 to 56 very strong scutes, with bilateral keels present on the caudal peduncle. From 86 to 98 scales and scutes are over the entire lateral line. The chest is completely scaled. The upper jaw contains an irregular series of outer canines with an inner band of small, regularly spaced teeth, while the lower jaw contains a single band of small teeth. The species has 35 to 42 gill rakers in total, 10 to 14 on the upper limb and 25 to 28 on the lower limb, with this the only feature that differs between C. crysos and C. caballus. Twenty-five vertebrae are present.

The blue runner's colour varies from bluish green to olive green dorsally, becoming silvery grey to brassy below. Juveniles often have seven dark, vertical bands on their bodies. Fin colour also varies, with all fins ranging from to dusky or hyaline to olive green. The species also has a dusky spot, which may not be distinct on the upper operculum.

== Distribution ==
The blue runner is extensively distributed throughout the tropical and temperate waters of the Atlantic Ocean, ranging widely along both the eastern American coastline and the western African and European coastlines. In the western Atlantic, the species' southernmost record comes from Maceio, Brazil, with the species ranging north along the Central American coastline, and throughout the Caribbean and the numerous archipelagos throughout. From the Gulf of Mexico, its distribution extends north along the U.S. coast and as far north as Nova Scotia in Canada, also taking in several north-west Atlantic islands. The blue runner is also present on several central Atlantic islands, making its distribution Atlantic-wide.

In the eastern Atlantic, the southernmost record is from Angola, with the blue runner distributed extensively along the west African coast north to Morocco and into the Mediterranean Sea. The blue runner is found throughout the Mediterranean, having been recorded from nearly all the countries on its shores. The species is rarely found north of Portugal in the north-east Atlantic, although records do exist of isolated catches from Madeira Island and Galicia, Spain. The furthest north it has been reported is southern Great Britain, where two specimens were taken in 1992 and 1993. A trend has been seen of having this and other tropical species found further north more often, with publications indicating the blue runner has recently established stable populations in the Canary Islands, where it had been rarely sighted. Some authors have attributed this northward migration to rising sea surface temperatures, possibly the result of climate change.

== Habitat ==
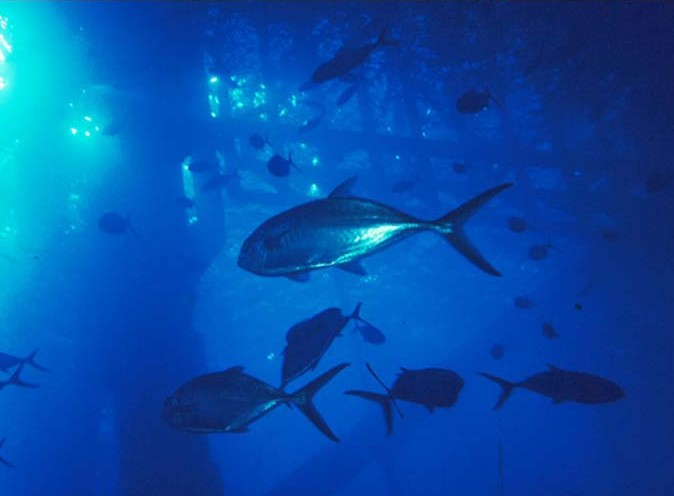
A shoal of blue runner under an oil platform in the Gulf of Mexico

The blue runner is primarily an inshore fish throughout most of its range, but it is known to live on reefs in water depths greater than 100 m. Throughout much of its Central American range, it is quite rare inshore, instead more commonly sighted on the outer reefs. The blue runner is primarily a semipelagic fish, inhabiting both inshore reefs and the outer shelf edges, sill reefs, and upper slopes of the deep reef. Those individuals on shallower reefs often move between reef patches over large sand expanses. Juvenile fish are also known to inhabit the shallow waters of inshore lagoons, taking refuge around mangroves or in seagrass amongst coral reef patches. Fishermen have also taken the species in the Mississippi Delta, indicating it can tolerate lower salinities in almost estuarine environments.

Blue runner are easily attracted to any large underwater or floating device, either natural or man made. Several studies have shown the species congregates around floating, buoy-like fish aggregating devices, both in shallower waters and in extremely deep (2500 m) waters, indicating the species may move around pelagically. In these situations, blue runner always form small aggregations at the water surface, while other larger species tend to congregate slightly deeper. A number of investigations around oil and gas platforms in the Gulf of Mexico have found blue runner congregate in large numbers around these in the warmer months, where they modify their feeding behavior to take advantage of the structure. Purpose-built artificial reefs and marine aquaculture cage structures are also known to attract the species, with the former having the added benefit of dispersing wayward food scraps.

== Biology ==
The blue runner normally moves either in small schools or as solitary individuals, although large aggregations of up to 10,000 individuals are known in unusual circumstances. Throughout some parts of its range, it is one of the most abundant species; for example, statistics from Santa Catarina Island indicate it is the third-most abundant species. Their biology, particularly reproductive and growth biology, has been quite extensively studied in the blue runner due to this high abundance in the Atlantic, and its importance to fisheries and the ecology of its environment.

=== Diet and feeding ===
The blue runner is a fast-swimming predator, which primarily takes small, benthic fishes as prey in inshore waters. Studies on the species' diet on both side of the Atlantic have shown similar results. A Puerto Rican study found the species supplements its fish-dominated diet with crabs, shrimp, copepods, and other small crustaceans. More detailed research in Cape Verde found as well as fish, blue runner take shrimp, prawns, lobsters, jellyfish, and other small invertebrates. The diet of juveniles is more zooplankton-dominated, with young fish predominantly taking cyclopoid and calanoid copepods, and gradually moving to a more fish-based diet. Adults living offshore or aggregating around oil and gas platforms tend to have less fish in their diet, foraging extensively on larger zooplankton during the summer, with larval decapods and stomatopods, hyperiid amphipods, pteropods, and larval and juvenile fishes also taken.

Studies around these platforms has found blue runner feed with equal intensity during both day and night, with larger prey such as fish taken preferentially at night, with smaller crustaceans taken during the day. Blue runner are one of a number of carangids known to forage in small schools alongside actively feeding spinner dolphins (Stenella longirostris), taking advantage of any scraps of food left by the feeding mammals, or any organisms displaced while they forage. The species is also known to eat the dolphins' excrement. As well as being important predators, they are also important prey to many larger species, including fishes, birds, and dolphins.

=== Reproduction and growth ===
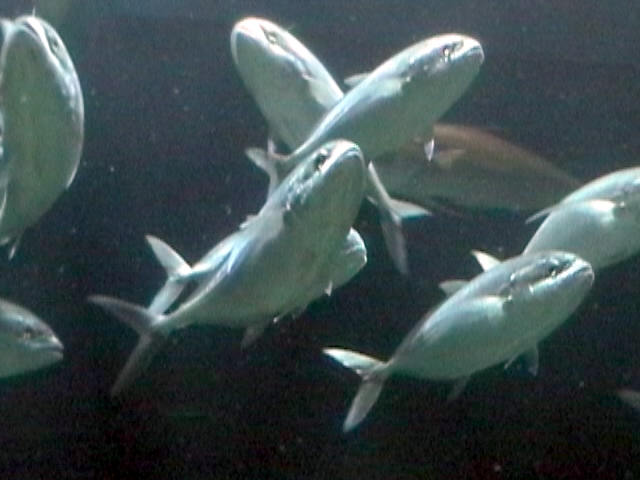
A school of blue runner in Spain

The blue runner reaches sexual maturity at slightly different lengths throughout its range, with all such studies occurring in the west Atlantic. Research in northwest Florida found a length at maturity of 267 mm, a study in Louisiana showed the species reaches sexual maturity at 247–267 mm in females and 225 mm in males, and in Jamaica lengths of 260 mm for males and 280 for females were estimated. Spawning appears to occur offshore year round, although several peaks in spawning activity have been found in different areas through the species range. Peak spawning season in the Gulf of Mexico occurs from June to August, with a secondary peak in spawning during October in northwest Florida. Elsewhere, peaks in larval abundance indicate spawning in the warmer summer months. Each female releases between 41,000 and 1,546,000 eggs on average, with larger fish producing more eggs. Both the eggs and larvae are pelagic.

The blue runner's larval stage has been extensively described, with distinguishing features including a slightly shallower body than other larval Caranx species, and a heavily pigmented head and body. During this early juvenile stage, there are several dark vertical bars clearly present on the side. Larvae and small juveniles remain offshore, living either at depths of around 10 to 20 m, or congregating around floating objects, particularly Sargassum mats and large jellyfish. As the fish grow, they often move to more inshore lagoons and reefs, before slowly making their way to deeper outer reefs at the onset of sexual maturity. Absolute growth rates are not well known, but the species has all the adult characteristics by a length of 59.3 mm. In all cases studied, there are more females in the adult population than males, with female to male ratios ranging from 1.15F:1M to 1.91F:1M. Annual mortality rates for the population in the Gulf of Mexico range from 0.41 to 0.53. The oldest known individual was 11 years old based on otolith rings.

== Relationship to humans ==
The blue runner is a highly important species to commercial fisheries throughout parts of its range. Due to its abundance, it may be one of the primary species in a fishery. The availability of fisheries statistics for the species is variable throughout its range, with the Americas having separate statistics kept for the species, while in Africa and Europe, it is lumped in with other carangids in statistics. In the Americas, recent catch data suggests an increased amount of the species is being taken (or reported), with the 2006 and 2007 catch averaging between 6000 and 7000 tonnes, while during the 1980s and 1990s, the annual catch was rarely greater than 1000 tonnes. Research on the fisheries of local regions has shown how important the fish is to certain fisheries. Artisanal fisheries in Santa Catarina Island have shown blue runner to be third-most important and abundant species, making up 5.6% of landings, or 4.38 tonnes. Even subsistence fisheries at the edge of its range in Brazil show a catch of 388 kg in two years from beach seines. Throughout its range, the blue runner is commercially taken by haul seines, lampara nets, purse seines, gill nets, and hook-and-line methods. The fish is sold at market either fresh, dried, or smoked, or as fishmeal, oil or bait.

Blue runner is also of high importance to recreational fisheries, with anglers often taking the species both for food and to use as bait. The blue runner has a reputation as an excellent gamefish on light tackle, taking both fish baits and a variety of lures, including hard-bodied bibbed lures, spoons, metal jigs, and soft plastic jigs. The species is also a target for light tackle saltwater fly fishermen, and can push lightweight fly tackle to its limits. The IGFA world record for blue runner stands at 5.05 kg (11 lb, 2 oz) caught off Dauphin Island by Stacey Moiren in 1997, previous records have also come from the eastern North Atlantic. The blue runner is used extensively as live bait for larger fish, including billfish, cobia, and amberjack. Although some people consider them low-quality table fish,, if they are filleted carefully and the blood line and dark red areas are removed, they are often prized for sushi and sashimi. larger specimens are known to carry the ciguatera toxin in their flesh, with several cases reported from the Virgin Islands.
