= Kabigan Falls =

Waterfall in Pagudpud, Ilocos Norte, Philippines

Coordinates: 18°35′29″N 120°51′53″E

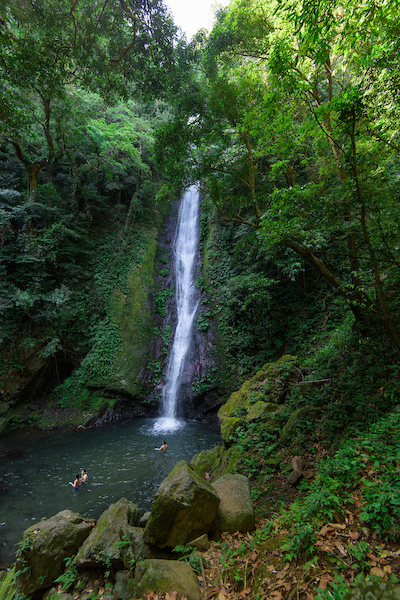
Kabigan Falls, Pagudpud, Ilocos Norte 2017

Kabigan Falls is a natural waterfall and tourist attraction in Brgy. Balaoi, Pagudpud, Ilocos Norte, Philippines.

Featuring a cascade of approximately 87 feet (27 m) high that drops into a concave basin, Kabigan Falls is hidden in a dense forest and is accessible via a trek along a trail near Bantay Abot Cave. It takes 10 to 15 minutes to get to the falls from the highway with the improved 900 metres (3,000 ft) access road leading to the waterfalls.
