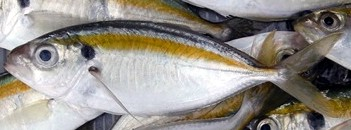

Conservation status
- Least Concern (IUCN 3.1)

Scientific classification
- Kingdom: Animalia
- Phylum: Chordata
- Class: Actinopterygii
- Division: Teleostei
- Order: Carangiformes
- Suborder: Carangoidei
- Family: Carangidae
- Subfamily: Caranginae
- Genus: Selaroides; Bleeker, 1851
- Species: S. leptolepis

Binomial name
- Selaroides leptolepis (G. Cuvier, 1833)
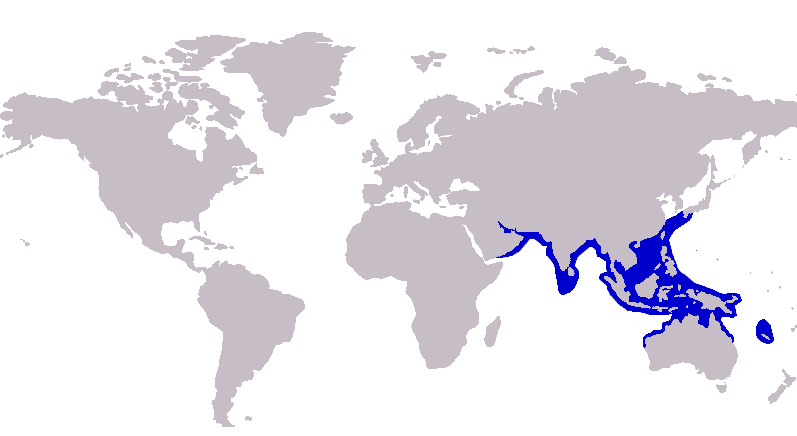
- Approximate range of the yellowstripe scad

Synonyms
- Caranx leptolepis Cuvier, 1833; Leptaspis leptolepis (Cuvier, 1833); Caranx mertensii Cuvier, 1833; Caranx procaranx De Vis, 1884; Caranx bidii Day, 1873; Caranx cheverti Alleyne & Macleay, 1877

= Yellowstripe scad =

Species of fish

The yellowstripe scad (Selaroides leptolepis), also known as the yellowstripe trevally, yellow-banded trevally, smooth-tailed trevally, slender-scaled trevally and slender trevally, is a species of small inshore fish in the jack and horse mackerel family Carangidae, and the only member of the genus Selaroides. The yellowstripe trevally is distributed throughout the tropical waters of the Indo-West Pacific region, ranging from the Persian Gulf in the west to Vanuatu and New Caledonia in the east. The species is distinguished by its prominent lateral yellow band, and differs from the scads of the genus Selar in having a smaller eye and different dentition. Although the yellowstripe scad reaches a maximum recorded length of 22 cm, it is normally encountered at sizes less than 15 cm. Phylogenetic studies indicate the yellowstripe scad is closely related to the scads of the genus Selar, although its exact placement in the family Carangidae is less well agreed upon.

A schooling species that predominantly inhabits inshore waters, the yellowstripe scad is a predatory fish, taking crustaceans, small fish and a variety of other planktonic prey. Feeding occurs at different times of the day and night throughout its range. The species reaches sexual maturity at around 8–13 cm, with spawning in India shown to occur in two peak periods from January to April and July to October. The yellowstripe scad is an important commercial species, with between 113,000 t and 195,000 t reported worldwide between 1990 and 2010. The species is predominantly harvested with trawls, however is also taken with smaller traditional nets. The yellowstripe scad is marketed fresh, frozen, as a dried fish snack as well as several novel ways including fish powder, surimi and burgers.

== Taxonomy and phylogeny ==
The yellowstripe scad is the only member of the monotypic genus Selaroides, one of around thirty genera in the jack and horse mackerel family Carangidae, which in turn is part of the order Carangiformes.

The yellowstripe scad was first scientifically described by the famed French naturalist Georges Cuvier in 1833 based on the holotype specimen taken from the waters of Java, Indonesia. He named the species Caranx leptolepis, with the specific epithet derived from Greek, meaning 'thin scales'. In 1851 the Dutch ichthyologist Pieter Bleeker re-examined the species and concluded it warranted placement in its own genus, which he named Selaroides meaning 'like Selar' in reference to the similarity between these fishes. For unknown reasons Bleeker later reassigned the species to another new genus, Leptaspis, without stating any reason for the change. As Selaroides was published first it has priority according to ICZN rules and Leptaspis is rendered an invalid junior synonym. In the same volume he described Caranx leptolepis, Cuvier also described Caranx mertensii based on a sketch alone. This name is now considered to be synonymous with S. leptolepis. Between 1883 and 1877 the species was redescribed a further three times, with all these names also considered to be junior synonyms.

The species is commonly referred to as the 'yellowstripe', 'yellow-banded' or 'gold-banded' scad or trevally in reference to the distinctive yellow strip running along the side of the species. Other names applied to the species include 'smooth-tailed trevally', 'slender-scaled' or 'thin scaled' trevally or scad and 'slender trevally', with an extensive list of non-English names also used.

The yellowstripe scad has been included in several phylogenetic analyses of the Carangidae, with each study suggesting slightly different relationships. All studies confirmed its placement in the subfamily Caranginae, a monophyletic grouping including the trevallies, jacks, scads and horse mackerels. The first of these studies by Soko Gushiken was based on morphological characteristics and found the species was part of a monophyletic clade of the scads and horse mackerels with Atule, Selar, Trachurus and Decapterus, being most closely related to Atule. A 1987 analysis of genetic divergence amongst the scads and horse mackerels using isozyme electrophoresis indicated the species was most closely related to Selar, forming a monophyletic clade with Trachurus, but being more distant from Decapterus. Two studies in 2002 and 2007 of mitochondrial cytochrome b sequences generally agreed that Selaroides was most closely related to Selar (depending on analysis type), however both indicated a closer relationship to the deeper bodied genera such as Caranx and Hemicaranx than to the scads of Trachurus and Decapterus.

== Description ==
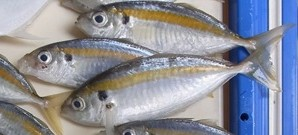
A trio of yellowstripe scad displaying their prominent yellow band

The yellowstripe scad is a small species, attaining a maximum length of 22 cm, but is more common at lengths less than 15 cm. The species has a body shape typical of many scads, with a compressed elongate, oblong body with the dorsal and ventral profiles equally curved. There is a fairly well developed adipose eyelid on the latter half of the eye. The dentition of the yellowstripe scad is one of the diagnostic features of the species, with the upper jaw and mouth being devoid of any teeth while the lower has a single series of fine villiform teeth. The dorsal fin is in two parts; the first having 8 spines and the second 1 spine and 24 to 26 soft rays. The anal fin has 2 detached spines followed by 20 to 23 soft rays. In one recorded case these two spines were not present. The soft dorsal and anal fins both have scaly basal sheaths. The pectoral fin is falcate and doesn't reach the junction of the curved and straight sections of the lateral line. The pectoral girdle has no groove, and is another defining characteristic. The anterior curve in the lateral line is moderate, with the straight section containing 13 to 25 scales and 24 to 29 small scutes. The breast is completely scaled. There are 40 to 46 gill rakers in total and 24 vertebrae.

The yellowstripe scad is a metallic blue to blue-green colour above grading to a silvery white below with a characteristic broad yellow stripe extending from the upper margin of the eye to the caudal peduncle. A black opercular spot is prominent and often extends onto the shoulder. The dorsal, anal and caudal fins are pale to dusky yellow, the pelvic fins are white and the pectoral fins hyaline.

== Distribution and habitat ==
The yellowstripe scad is distributed throughout the tropical and subtropical waters of the Indian and western Pacific Oceans. In the Indian Ocean its ranges from the Persian Gulf and the northern Arabian Peninsula, eastward to India and South East Asia, and down to northern Australia where it is known from Shark Bay in the west to Brisbane in the east. The species is also known from offshore islands such as the Maldives in the Indian Ocean. The yellowstripe scad inhabits the western Pacific Ocean from Japan in the north south to the Indonesian Archipelago and several east Pacific Islands including New Caledonia and Vanuatu.

The yellowstripe scad is predominantly an inshore species, and occurs in large demersal schools over soft substrates. In Australia it inhabits inshore and shallow shelf waters to depths of 50m, while in Malaysia has been recorded to 70 m depth, although is most common between 40 and 60 m depth.

== Biology and ecology ==
The yellowstripe scad is a common schooling species throughout its range, and due to its importance to fisheries has been well studied. In northern Australia, the Philippines and parts of India it has been found to be one of the most common species in these waters. Schools of yellowstripe scad is known to seasonally migrate to coastal waters in summer and back to deeper shelf waters in Taiwan, with no other clear movements recorded throughout its range.

The yellowstripe scad is a predatory fish, taking a variety of crustaceans and other small prey items, with its exact diet varying both spatially and temporally. In northern Australia the most common prey items are ostracods, gastropods and euphausiids. The diet of individuals in India is more varied, with crustaceans, notably decapods and copepods making up the main part of the diet. Small fishes of the genus Anchoviella, pteropods, algal material, diatoms, molluscan larvae and foraminifera make up a lesser part of the diet here also. The species shows some diet partitioning between size classes, and during the year, the diet shifts as prey items vary in abundance. The species is diurnally active in India, while elsewhere in its range, nocturnal feeding has been reported. Unlike some of its relatives, feeding continues during spawning, with no apparent change in food preferences.

The published length that yellowstripe scad become sexually mature at varies between 8.8 cm when less than a year old and 11.4 cm. In his research, Tandon noted that his estimate was much lower than previous studies had suggested, which he explained as sampling bias due to larger net mesh size in the previous work. There is a prolonged breeding season in India, with each individual spawning only once a year. The season extends from July to March with two peaks in January to April and July to October. In morphometric studies conducted in the same area, it was found some morphometric and meristic characters had a variation that was difficult to reconcile as being due to different generations or populations. Instead it was suggested that due to the two major periods of spawning occurring in different seasons, the markedly different water temperature and salinity during these peaks possibly influenced these traits. During spawning, the male to female ratio is close to parity at 1:1, but at other times of the year it varies by location, with females usually being more abundant. The reason for this is unclear however, and might suggest segregation of the sexes between spawning periods. The fecundity of yellowstripe scad is directly correlated with the size of the fish, with 6300 ova documented for an individual of 9.5 cm and up to 37400 ova for a 13.1 cm individual. The egg characteristics and stages of ova maturity are well documented, as are the early stages of post-egg growth. The eggs are pelagic, and are known from coastal as well as lower estuarine waters. Like the young of other carangids, the larvae and juveniles of the yellowstripe scad are known to associate with large jellyfish, using them as protection. Unlike most species however, the yellowstripe scad travels ahead of the umbrella, only moving in advanced jerks in rhythm with the jellyfish.

== Relationship to humans ==
Global capture production of Yellowstripe scad (Selaroides leptolepis) in thousand tonnes from 1950 to 2022, as reported by the FAO

The yellowstripe scad is an important species for commercial and subsistence fisheries throughout its range. Between 1990 and 2010 the FAO reported worldwide catch has ranged between 113,000 and 195,000 t, with a consistent trend towards higher catches. These statistics only include Indonesia, Malaysia and the UAE, suggesting true catch sizes to be higher. Of the countries that report catches to the FAO, Indonesia takes the highest amount, with between 129,000 t and 180,000 t reported each year between 2000 and 2010. Locally yellowstripe scad make up a high percentage of the catch; in an Indian example, it accounted for up to 36% of total landings in one survey. However, in India overall, yellowstripe scad makes up only 1.5% of total carangid catches. The species is predominantly taken in trawls, however is also caught by gill net, bag net, purse seines or ring nets, and push nets. The species is most abundant during spawning periods in India and consists of 8–13 cm individuals. A study on the population dynamics in an Indian fishery during 1994 found there was low fishing pressure on the stocks, however a later assessment found stocks elsewhere in India to be overexploited. The novel use of hydroacoustic sounding to estimate the school size of yellowstripe scad, as well as other scad species, has been trialled with varying levels of effectiveness.

The yellowstripe scad is a dark fleshed species of fair eating quality. The species is marketed in a variety of ways apart from being sold fresh or frozen at market. The yellowstripe scad is commonly used as a dried fish snack in Asian countries, processed either by salting, curing or mechanical drying, with extensive trials on the optimum conditions and chemical agents for production. The yellowtail scad has also been part of trials into use as fish powder, with a high protein content considered to make the species a candidate. The fat content of the powder can be reduced by treatment, but this negatively affects solubility and other properties. With high lipid and myoglobin content, the species has been considered a poor candidate for surimi (seafood sticks) in the past, however experiments with heating of the surimi gel have shown that this can improve its properties and make it more cohesive.

In Singapore and Malaysia, the yellowtail scad (known locally as ikan kuning) is often deep-fried until crispy and served with nasi lemak. In Malaysia, where the species is considered underutilised, a trial of yellowtail scad use in fish burgers with threadfin bream found the product to be acceptable, leading to a favourable market trial.
