= Pacific bumper =

Conservation status
- Least Concern (IUCN 3.1)

Scientific classification
- Kingdom: Animalia
- Phylum: Chordata
- Class: Actinopterygii
- Order: Carangiformes
- Suborder: Carangoidei
- Family: Carangidae
- Genus: Chloroscombrus
- Species: C. orqueta

Binomial name
- Chloroscombrus orqueta D. S. Jordan & C. H. Gilbert, 1883

Species of ray-finned fish

The Pacific bumper (Chloroscombrus orqueta) is one of two game fish in the genus Chloroscombrus, from the subfamily Caranginae of the family Carangidae, part of the order Carangiformes.

It is listed by the IUCN as Least Concern. This species ranges from southern California to the Gulf of California to central Peru. It is also found around Malpelo Island.
