= Pagudpud =

Municipality in Ilocos Norte, Philippines

- Municipality
- Municipality of Pagudpud
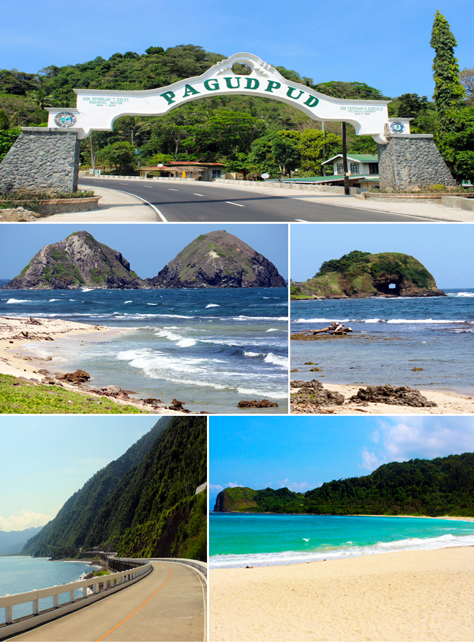
- From top to bottom right: Welcome arch passing through Pan-Philippine Highway, Dos Hermanos islands, Bantay Abot cave, Patapat Viaduct overlooking Pasaleng Bay, and Blue Lagoon

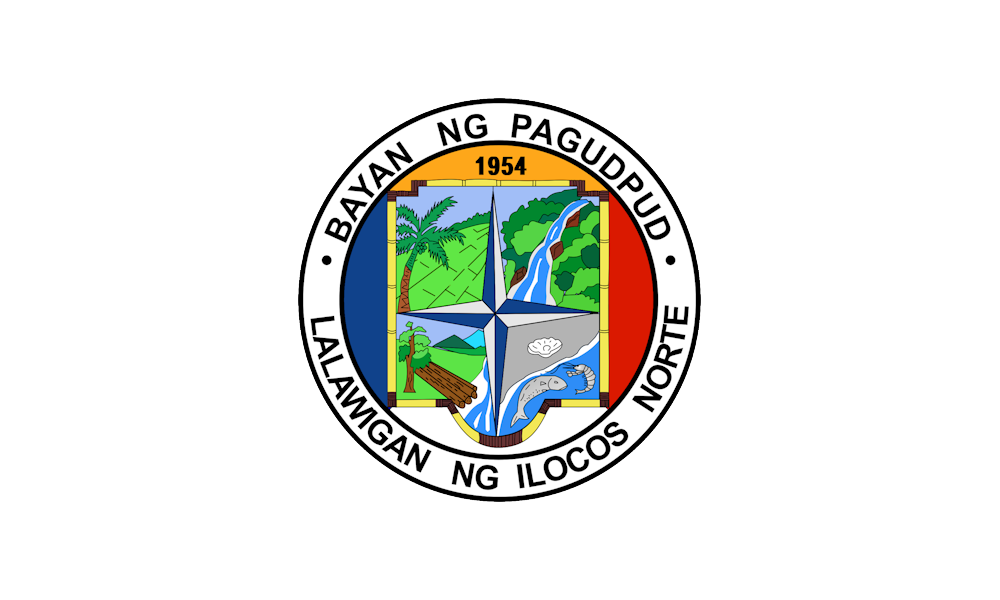
- Flag Seal

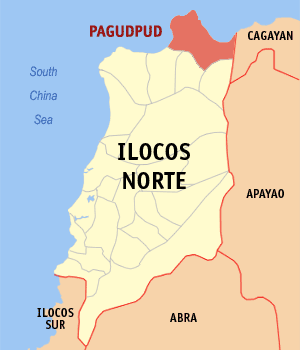
- Map of Ilocos Norte with Pagudpud highlighted
- Interactive map of Pagudpud
- Location within the Philippines
- Coordinates: 18°33′41″N 120°47′16″E
- Country: Philippines
- Region: Ilocos Region
- Province: Ilocos Norte
- District: 1st district
- Founded: February 14, 1954
- Barangays: 16 (see Barangays)

Government
  - Type: Sangguniang Bayan
  - Mayor: Rafael Ralph L. Benemerito II
  - Vice Mayor: Bingbong Calvan
  - Representative: Ferdinand Alexander Araneta Marcos III
  - Municipal Council: Members: Ferdinand R. Garvida; Reynald M. Garvida; Emilen G. Sales; Maindryann A. Sales; Wilfred C. Ubasa; Rajan Christian L. Benemerito; Efren B. Cimatu Sr.; Joseph P. Caliw-Caliw
  - Electorate: 19,875 voters (2025)

Area
  - Total: 194.90 km^{2} (75.25 sq mi)
- Elevation: 92 m (302 ft)
- Highest elevation: 1,295 m (4,249 ft)
- Lowest elevation: 0 m (0 ft)

Population (2024 census)
  - Total: 25,565
  - Density: 131.17/km^{2} (339.73/sq mi)
  - Households: 6,690

Economy
  - Income class: 1st municipal income class
  - Poverty incidence: 3.77% (2023)
  - Revenue: ₱ 312.9 million (2024)
  - Assets: ₱ 743.2 million (2024)
  - Expenditure: ₱ 263.4 million (2024)
  - Liabilities: ₱ 228.5 million (2024)

Service provider
  - Electricity: Ilocos Norte Electric Cooperative (INEC)
- Time zone: UTC+8 (PST)
- ZIP code: 2919
- PSGC: 0102815000
- IDD : area code: +63 (0)77
- Native languages: Ilocano; Tagalog

Pagudpud, officially the Municipality of Pagudpud (Ilocano: Ili ti Pagudpud; Filipino: Bayan ng Pagudpud), is a municipality in the province of Ilocos Norte, Philippines. According to the 2024 census, it has a population of 25,565 people.

It is the northernmost settlement on Luzon Island and a popular tourist destination because of its resorts and beaches. In addition to tourism, people also make their living through farming, fishing, and subsistence retailing. Recently, many windmills are erected in Barangay Caparispisan.

== History ==
During World War II, the American submarine USS Stingray landed weapons on the coast of Sitio Bimmanaaw in barrio Caunayan to aid the Philippine resistance against Japan in 1944.

Having previously been a part of the neighboring town of Bangui, Pagudpud was established as a separate municipality on 14 February 1954.

== Geography ==
The topography includes mountains, hills, valleys, and flat coastal land. Maira-ira Beach is the northernmost tip of Luzon Island, located at 18°33′34″N 120°47′15″E on the Luzon Strait.

Pagudpud is situated 72.51 kilometres (45.06 mi) from the provincial capital Laoag, and 558.02 kilometres (346.74 mi) from the country's capital city of Manila.

=== Barangays ===
Pagudpud is politically divided into 16 barangays. Each barangay consists of puroks and some have sitios.

There are 2 barangays that are considered urban (highlighted in bold) and 3 barangays that are considered the eastern part (highlighted in italics).

- Aggasi
- Baduang
- Balaoi
- Burayoc
- Caparispisan
- Caunayan
- Dampig
- Ligaya
- Pancian
- Pasaleng
- **Poblacion 1**
- **Poblacion 2**
- Saguigui
- Saud
- Subec
- Tarrag

=== Climate ===
Climate data for Pagudpud, Ilocos Norte
| Month | Jan | Feb | Mar | Apr | May | Jun | Jul | Aug | Sep | Oct | Nov | Dec | Year |
|---|---|---|---|---|---|---|---|---|---|---|---|---|---|
| Mean daily maximum °C (°F) | 31 (88) | 32 (90) | 33 (91) | 34 (93) | 34 (93) | 34 (93) | 33 (91) | 32 (90) | 32 (90) | 33 (91) | 32 (90) | 31 (88) | 33 (91) |
| Mean daily minimum °C (°F) | 19 (66) | 20 (68) | 21 (70) | 23 (73) | 24 (75) | 24 (75) | 24 (75) | 24 (75) | 24 (75) | 23 (73) | 22 (72) | 21 (70) | 22 (72) |
| Average rainfall mm (inches) | 6.2 (0.24) | 11.7 (0.46) | 10.1 (0.40) | 14 (0.6) | 192.7 (7.59) | 258.9 (10.19) | 470.9 (18.54) | 475.9 (18.74) | 405.7 (15.97) | 92.5 (3.64) | 44.8 (1.76) | 2 (0.1) | 1,985.4 (78.23) |
| Average rainy days | 3 | 2 | 2 | 2 | 12 | 15 | 20 | 20 | 17 | 10 | 6 | 3 | 112 |
Source: World Weather Online

== Demographics ==
Population census of Pagudpud

| Year | Pop. | ±% p.a. |
|---|---|---|
| 1960 | 8,702 | — |
| 1970 | 11,283 | +2.63% |
| 1975 | 12,388 | +1.89% |
| 1980 | 13,675 | +2.00% |
| 1990 | 16,558 | +1.93% |
| 1995 | 17,168 | +0.68% |

| Year | Pop. | ±% p.a. |
|---|---|---|
| 2000 | 19,315 | +2.56% |
| 2007 | 20,385 | +0.75% |
| 2010 | 21,877 | +2.60% |
| 2015 | 23,770 | +1.59% |
| 2020 | 25,098 | +1.15% |
| 2024 | 25,565 | +0.44% |

Source: Philippine Statistics Authority

In the 2024 census, the population of Pagudpud was 25,565 people, with a density of 130 inhabitants per square kilometre or 340 inhabitants per square mile.

=== Religion ===
Roman Catholicism is the largest religion in Pagudpud. Be that as it may, there are increasing numbers of members of other Christian Denominations such as Jehovah's Witnesses (with two congregations) and Iglesia ni Cristo. Islam, brought by Muslim immigrants, is also practiced in Pagudpud.

== Economy ==
Poverty incidence of Pagudpud (%)

Source: Philippine Statistics Authority

Pagudpud's main agricultural crops are rice, coffee, and coconut. Livestock raising in Pagudpud includes carabaos and swine.

== Government ==
=== Local government ===
Pagudpud, belonging to the first congressional district of the province of Ilocos Norte, is governed by a mayor designated as its local chief executive and by a municipal council as its legislative body in accordance with the Local Government Code. The mayor, vice mayor, and the councilors are elected directly by the people through an election which is being held every three years.

=== Elected officials ===
Members of the Municipal Council (2025–2028)
| Position | Name |
|---|---|
| Congressman | Ferdinand Alexander A. Marcos III |
| Mayor | Rafael Ralph L. Benemerito II |
| Vice-Mayor | Melvyn B. Calvan II |
| Councilors | Mariecel R. Garvida |
| Councilors | Rajiv Constantine L. Benemerito |
| Councilors | Rex Constantino S. Benemerito Jr. |
| Councilors | Efren F. Cimatu Jr. |
| Councilors | Lovella S. Garvida |
| Councilors | Emilen G. Sales |
| Councilors | Imelda B. Llanes |
| Councilors | Nathaniel S. Edu |

=== Municipal seal ===

- Blue, Red, Yellow, and White, reflection of the colors of the Philippines 1954, the year Pagudpud was founded
- Coconut Tree and Ricefield, represents as farming as one of the economic resources of the town, with coconut, palay and vegetables as its major products
- Waterfall, represents Mabogobog falls, which is the source of a Mini Hydro Power Plant.
- Mountain, Tree and Logs, represents the forestry resources of the town
- Fish and Shrimps, represents its marine resources
- Shell with Pearl, symbolizes the tourism potential of the town which is famous for its white beaches
- North Star, stands for the location of the town of Pagudpud, which is in the northern tip of the Province.

== Transportation ==
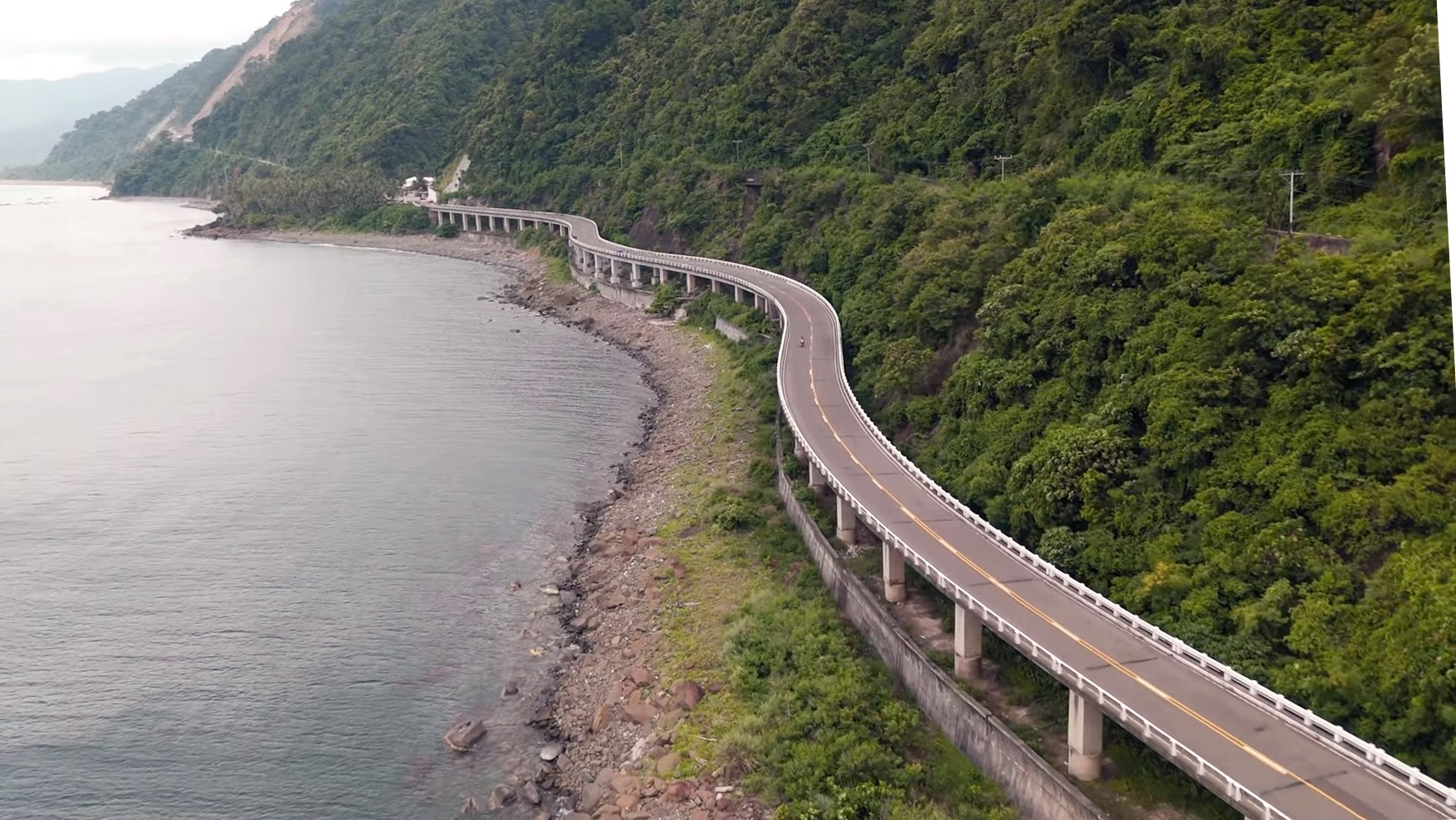
Patapat Viaduct

By land, Pagudpud is approximately a 90-minute bus ride from Laoag.

== Education ==
Adams-Pagudpud Schools District Office governs all public and private elementary and high schools within the municipality including those public schools located in Adams, Ilocos Norte.

=== Primary and elementary schools ===
- Aggasi Elementary School
- Balaoi Elementary School
- Burayoc Elementary School
- Caparispisan Primary School
- Caunayan Elementary School
- Dampig Elementary School
- Gamaban Elementary School
- God Father Learning Center of Pagudpud
- Luzong Elementary School
- Luzuyo Primary School
- Pagudpud Central Elementary School
- Pagudpud South CES
- Pancian Elementary School
- Pasaleng Elementary School
- Saguigui Elementary School
- Saud Elementary School
- Subec Elementary School
- Tarrag Primary School

=== Secondary schools ===
- Luzong NHS
- Pagudpud NHS
- Pasaleng National High School
- St. Jude High School of Pagudpud Ilocos Norte

== Tourism ==
The Philippines' ninth tourist rest area was inaugurated in Saud Beach in 2024.

== Gallery ==
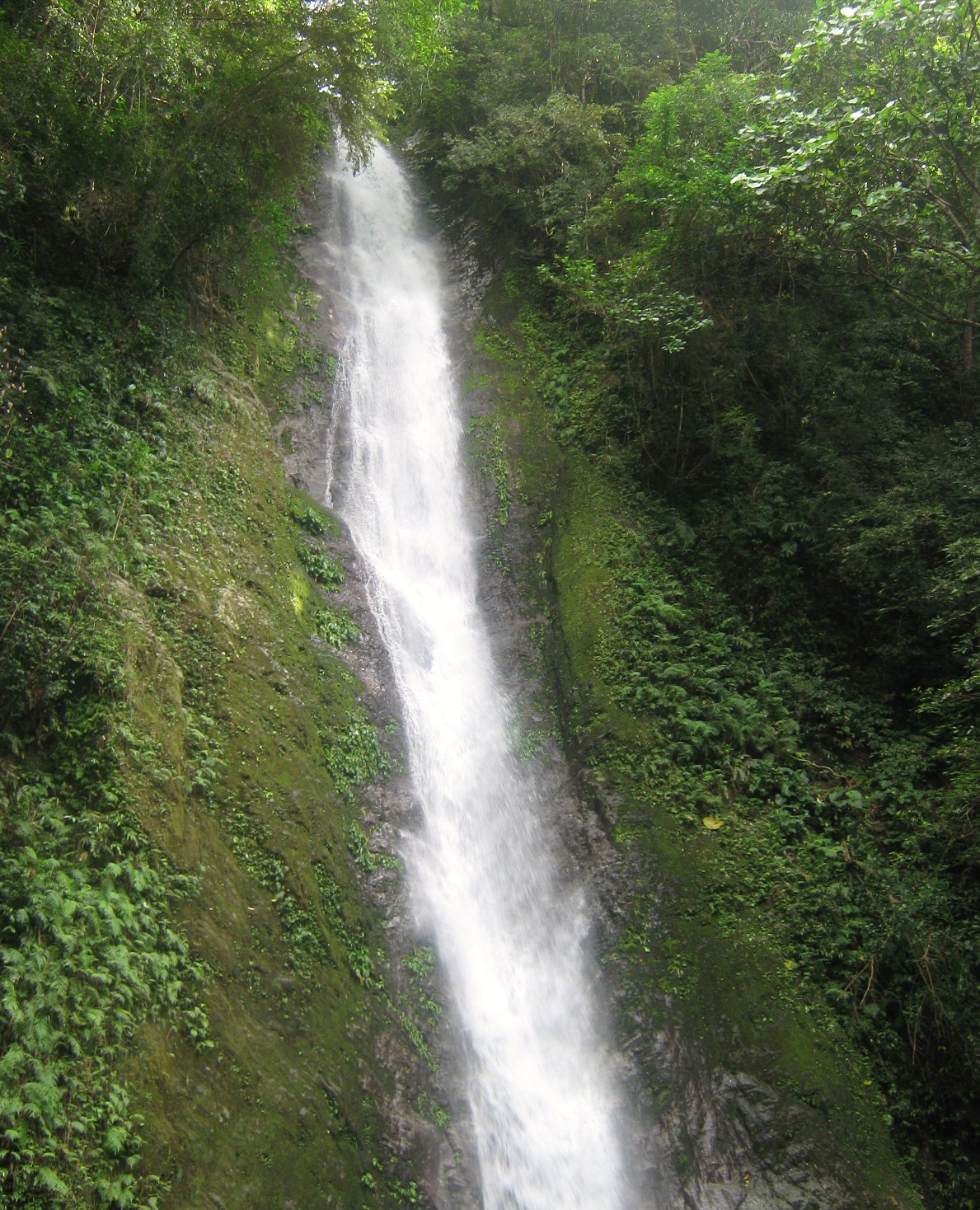
Kabigan Falls in Pagudpud

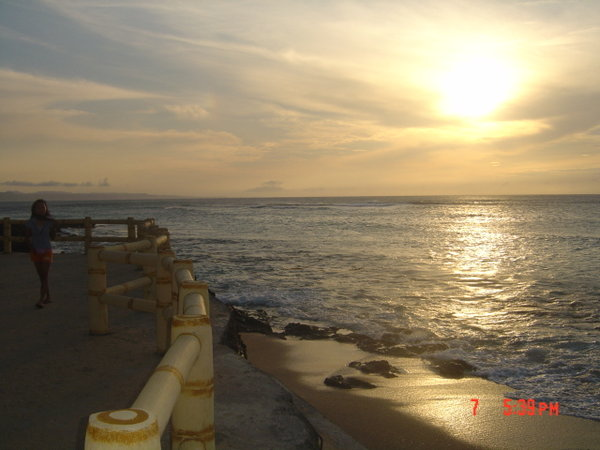
Sunset at Burayoc Point at the juncture of Saud Beach near Pagudpud Rinnovati.

Saud Beach near Apo Idon resort. The Northwind Power windmills in neighboring Bangui can be seen in the distance.

== See also ==
- Patapat Viaduct
