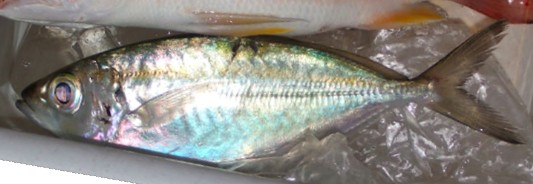

Conservation status
- Least Concern (IUCN 3.1)

Scientific classification
- Kingdom: Animalia
- Phylum: Chordata
- Class: Actinopterygii
- Order: Carangiformes
- Suborder: Carangoidei
- Family: Carangidae
- Genus: Selar
- Species: S. boops

Binomial name
- Selar boops (G. Cuvier, 1833)

Synonyms
- Caranx boops Cuvier, 1833; Caranx gervaisi Castelnau, 1875; Caranx freeri Evermann & Seale, 1907

= Selar boops =

Species of fish

Selar boops, the oxeye scad, is a species of ray-finned fish in the family Carangidae, the scads, jacks and trevallies. It is found in the Indo-Pacific. It is an important species for fisheries in some parts of its range.

== Description ==
Adults can grow up to 25 centimetres (9.8 in) but usually grow up to 22 centimetres (8.7 in). They have 9 dorsal spines, 23 to 25 dorsal soft rays, 3 anal spines, and 19 to 21 anal soft rays. This fish is silvery blue with a horizontal yellow line going through the middle. It grows to a maximum total length of 26 centimetres (10 in). It has a large eye which takes up around a third of the head and its specific name, boops refers to this feature being a compound of bo meaning "ox" and ops meaning "eye".

== Distribution ==
Its range in the Indian Ocean is from Sri Lanka and eastern India to the Andaman Sea, Southeast Asia, and north western Australia. Other populations occur in the Pacific Ocean around Southeast Asia, northern Australia, various Pacific islands, and Central America.

== Habitat and biology ==
Selar boops is most commonly recorded over seagrass beds or softer substrates but it also occurs over coral and rocky reefs. It forms large diurnal schools, which disperse at night to feed on crabs, shrimps and small fishes which are caught either in the water column or from the bottom. Its eggs are pelagic. It lives at depths between 35 and 500 metres (115 and 1,640 ft).

== Human use ==
Selar boops is a commercially important target species for fisheries in some parts of its distribution. In Indonesia various types of fishing gear are used to catch this species including purse seines, gill nets, lift nets, handlines and beach seines.
