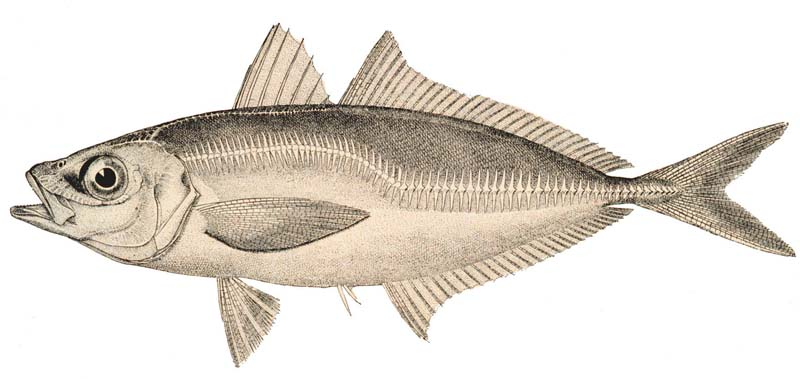
- Bigeye scad (S. crumenophthalmus)

Scientific classification
- Kingdom: Animalia
- Phylum: Chordata
- Class: Actinopterygii
- Order: Carangiformes
- Suborder: Carangoidei
- Family: Carangidae
- Subfamily: Caranginae
- Genus: Selar; Bleeker, 1851

Type species
- Caranx boops (Cuvier, 1833)

= Selar (fish) =

Genus of ray-finned fishes

Selar is a genus of ray-finned fishes from the family Carangidae which includes the scads, jacks, pompanos, trevallies and horse mackerels. The generic name, Selar, is the local name for the oxeye scad in Jakarta.

== Species ==
There are currently two recognized species in this genus:

Image	Scientific name	Common name	Distribution
	Selar boops (Cuvier, 1833)	Oxeye scad	Indo-Pacific.
	Selar crumenophthalmus (Bloch, 1793)	Bigeye scad	Indo-Pacific: East Africa to Rapa, north to southern Japan and the Hawaiian Islands, south to New Caledonia. Eastern Pacific: Mexico to Peru, including the Galapagos Islands. Western Atlantic: Nova Scotia, Canada and Bermuda through the Gulf of Mexico and the Caribbean to São Paulo, Brazil. Eastern Atlantic: Cape Verde to southern Angola
