= Japanese scad =

Japanese scad is a common name for different Carangidae species, including:

- Decapterus maruadsi
- Trachurus japonicus
