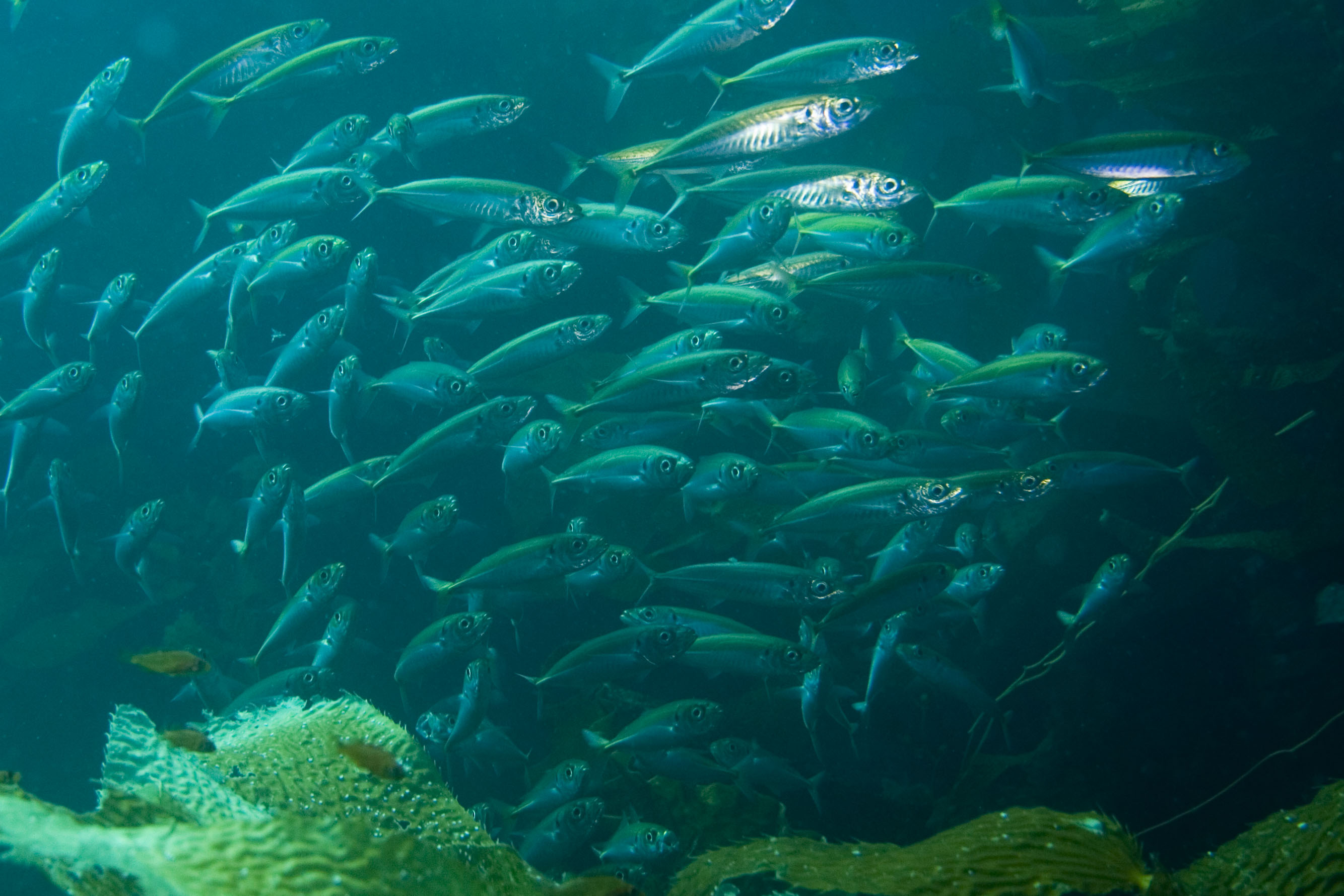

Conservation status
- Least Concern (IUCN 3.1)

Scientific classification
- Kingdom: Animalia
- Phylum: Chordata
- Class: Actinopterygii
- Division: Teleostei
- Order: Carangiformes
- Suborder: Carangoidei
- Family: Carangidae
- Genus: Trachurus
- Species: T. symmetricus

Binomial name
- Trachurus symmetricus (Ayres, 1855)

Synonyms
- Caranx symmetricus, Ayres, 1855; Decapterus polyaspis, Walford & Myers, 1944; Trachurus symmetricus symmetricus, (Ayres, 1855); Trachurus picturatus symmetricus, (Ayres, 1855)

= Pacific jack mackerel =

Species of fish

The Pacific jack mackerel (Trachurus symmetricus), also known as the Californian jack mackerel or simply jack mackerel, is an abundant species of pelagic marine fish in the jack family, Carangidae. It is distributed along the western coast of North America, ranging from Alaska in the north to the Gulf of California in the south, inhabiting both offshore and inshore environments. The Pacific jack mackerel is a moderately large fish, growing to a maximum recorded length of 81 cm, although commonly seen below 55 cm. It is very similar in appearance to other members of its genus, Trachurus, especially T. murphyi, which was once thought to be a subspecies of T. symmetricus, and inhabits waters further south. Pacific jack mackerel travel in large schools, ranging up to 600 miles offshore and to depths of 400 m, generally moving through the upper part of the water column.

== Distribution and habitat ==
The Pacific jack mackerel is distributed through the northeastern Pacific Ocean from Alaska in the north, south to the western North American seaboard to the Baja California peninsula in the Gulf of California. It has been reported as far south as the Galápagos Islands, but at these latitudes it would be sympatric with T. murphyi, possibly resulting in confusion of the two species. Pacific jack mackerel occur in both pelagic and inshore environments, often venturing up to 600 miles offshore and to known depths of 400 m. In more coastal environments, they are known to inhabit bays and very shallow waters.

== Description ==
The Pacific jack mackerel is very similar to all other members of Trachurus and a number of other carangid genera, having an elongated, slightly compressed body with both the dorsal and ventral profiles of the body having the same degree of curvature. It is a medium-to-large-sized fish, growing to a maximum known length of 81 cm (32 in), although more commonly below 55 cm. The two separate dorsal fins are composed of eight spines and one spine followed by 31 to 35 soft rays, respectively. The anal fin is composed of two spines anteriorly detached followed by one spine connected to 26 to 30 soft rays. In some larger individuals, the last few rays at the posterior of the soft dorsal and anal fins are almost entirely separate from the rest of the fin, forming finlets. The caudal fin is strongly forked, typical amongst Carangidae, while the ventral fin consists of one spine and five soft rays. The pectoral fin terminates before the front of the anal fin, having 22 to 24 rays in total. The lateral line dips strongly after the pectoral fin, having 50 to 53 scales on the upper section and 43 to 52 keeled scutes posteriorly. The species' teeth are minute, with a patch of teeth on the tongue in a narrow club-shaped strip. There are 24 vertebrae in total.

Pacific jack mackerel are metallic blue to olive-green dorsally, becoming more silvery ventrally, before transitioning to a white belly. The top of the head and area near eye is quite dark with a dark spot on the upper rear of the gill cover. The fins are mostly hyaline to dusky, although caudal fin may be yellow to reddish.

== Relationship to humans ==
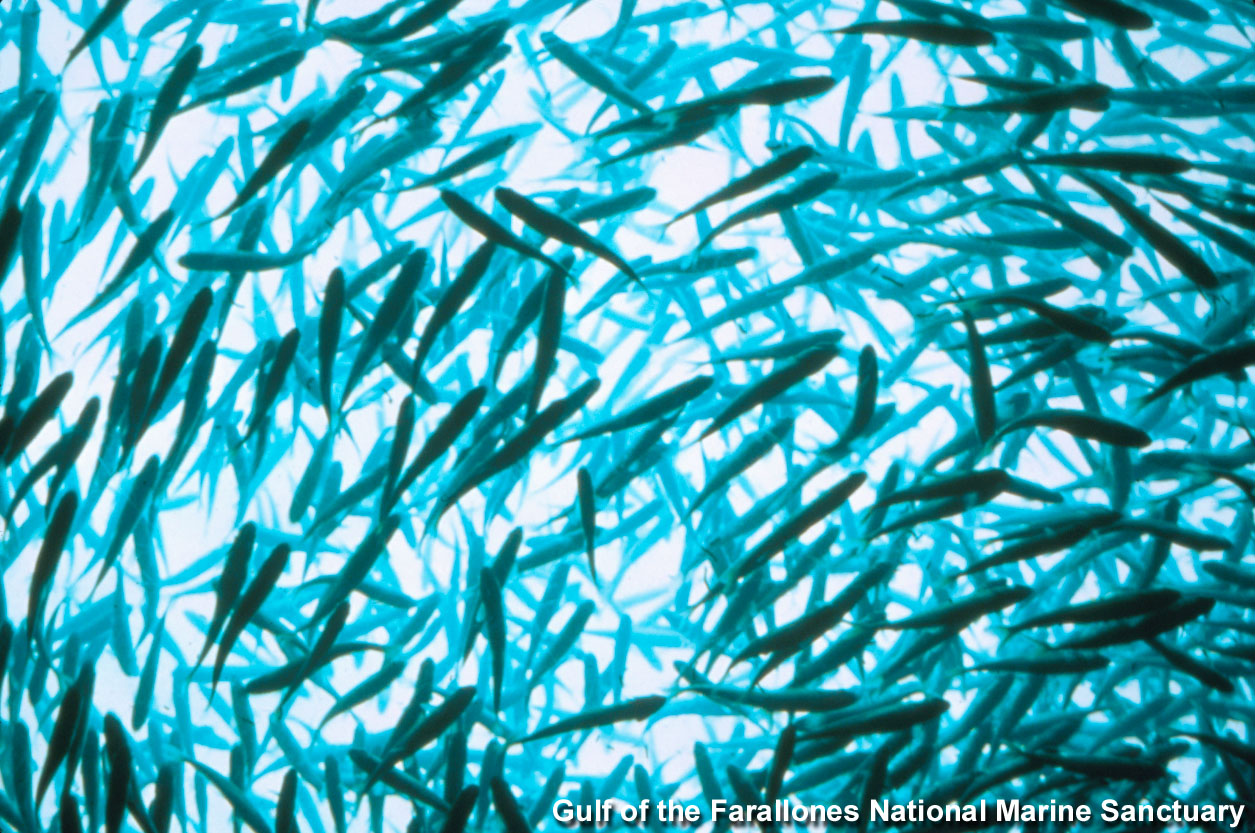
A swirling mass of Pacific jack mackerel form a bait ball which draws feeding seabirds and marine mammals

Pacific jack mackerel are fished commercially as well as for sport. They are often caught on baited hook from piers and boats, and also while salmon trolling. Commercial fishing occurs along the coast. Large individuals often move inshore and north in the summer. Pacific jack mackerel is canned in the same manner as salmon. Fish are cleaned, gutted and finned, then packed into cans with salt and water.

=== History ===
Before 1947, the pacific jack mackerel was of minor importance. It was referred to as the horse mackerel, and had little market appeal. However, in 1948, the US Food and Drug Administration decided to allow the use of "jack mackerel" on all labeling, and that affected its appeal. The new label, combined with low catches of Pacific sardine in 1947-48 and increased catches of pacific jack mackerel during the same time, resulted in the fish gaining importance. In the past, mackerel consumption was considered a sign of low income. In the segregated American South, it was often associated with African Americans. Today, most of these stereotypes are gone.

=== As food ===
Pacific jack mackerel tastes similar to canned sardines. It may be used interchangeably with salmon or tuna in recipes. Jack mackerel is considered safer to consume than tuna because it is a smaller fish, and not a top predator, thus avoiding accumulation of heavy metals such as mercury.

== Taxonomy and naming ==
The Pacific jack mackerel is classified within the genus Trachurus, commonly known as the horse mackerels or jack mackerels. Trachurus is part of the jack family Carangidae, which is classified within the order Carangiformes. Recent genetic studies have divided the Carangidae into four subfamilies, with the genus Trachurus falling into Caranginae (or tribe Carangini), being most closely related to the 'scads' of the genera Decapterus and Selar.

The species was first scientifically described by William Orville Ayres in 1855 based on the holotype specimen taken from San Francisco Bay, California. He named the species Caranx symmetricus, correctly identifying its relationship to the jacks, but incorporating it into what was later found to be the wrong genus. The fish was redescribed in 1944 under a different name, Decapterus polyaspis, from a specimen caught in Oregon, which under the ICZN rules classifies as a junior synonym, and it is therefore discarded. In 1983, C. symmetricus was transferred to Trachurus symmetricus by William N. Eschmeyer and Earl Herald. The species has twice been treated as a subspecies; once as Trachurus picturatus symmetricus (a subspecies of the blue jack mackerel), and the second more commonly used subspecies of Trachurus symmetricus symmetricus. For many years, the latter was accepted as a valid combination, with Trachurus symmetricus murphyi considered to be a southern subspecies population. Mitochondrial DNA analysis has now confirmed these subspecies to be separate species, with T. s. murphyi now simply Trachurus murphyi, the Inca scad. The divergence time of these two species was deemed relatively recent, at around 250,000 years ago.

T. symmetricus is known commonly as the 'Pacific jack mackerel' in reference to its distribution, with the species often called simply 'jack mackerel' or 'mackereljack'
