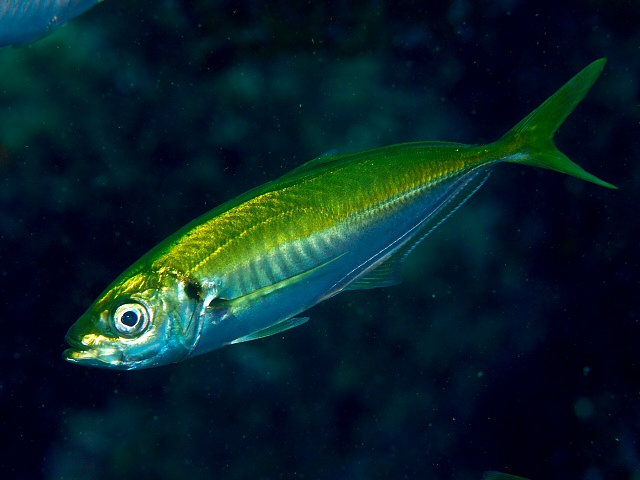

Conservation status
- Near Threatened (IUCN 3.1)

Scientific classification
- Kingdom: Animalia
- Phylum: Chordata
- Class: Actinopterygii
- Order: Carangiformes
- Suborder: Carangoidei
- Family: Carangidae
- Genus: Trachurus
- Species: T. japonicus

Binomial name
- Trachurus japonicus (Temminck & Schlegel, 1844)

Synonyms
- Caranx trachurus japonicus Temminck & Schlegel, 1844; Trachurops japonicus (Temminck & Schlegel, 1844); Trachurus argenteus Wakiya, 1924

= Japanese jack mackerel =

Species of fish

The Japanese jack mackerel (Trachurus japonicus), also known as the Japanese horse mackerel or Japanese scad, is a species named after its resemblance to mackerel but which is in the family Carangidae, the jacks, pompanos, trevallies and scads. Their maximum reported length is 50 cm (20 in) with a common length of 35 cm (14 in). They have a maximum reported weight of 0.66 kg (1.5 lb) and a maximum reported age of 12 years. They are found around the coast of Japan, except Okinawa Island, usually on sandy bottoms of 50–275 m (164–902 ft) deep. They feed mainly on small crustaceans such as copepods, as well as shrimp and small fish. They are similar to the yellowtail horse mackerel around New Zealand and Australia, apart from having more gill rakers and larger eyes.

The Japanese name for the horse mackerel is aji (あじ) and by default generally implies the species Trachurus japonicus, which can be more specifically referred to as ma-aji (まあじ; lit. 'true aji'). The name is most commonly written in hiragana; although a kanji (鯵・鰺) does exist, it is not in common use. It is commonly deep fried or salt-grilled.

In Korean cuisine, the fish is dubbed jeon-gaeng-i (전갱이) and is the default horse mackerel designated by this name. It is commonly grilled or fried as a jeon-gaeng-i gui (전갱이 구이). Among the specialties of Jeju cuisine is the soup gagjaegi-gug (각재기국), the name of which is derived from the name for the fish in the Jeju language.

== Description ==
The Japanese jack mackerel (Trachurus japonicus) is a small fish with an average length between 13 – 40 cm, and a maximum recorded size of 50 cm. It is greyish blue on its back, having a silver color on its underside, with a black blotch over the gills. The dorsal and pectoral fins are a dusky color whereas the pelvic and anal fins are pale. One of the main distinguishing features of the Japanese Jack Mackerel is its bright yellow caudal fin which stands out compared to the rest of the species' coloration. Its scales are common among other species in its family, being dense in a horizontal and coarse in a vertical direction with a bend in the midpoint of the scale to follow the curvature of the animal. Scales on anterior half of the species have this curve, while those on the posterior half are straight, with any scales in between these two sections being pointed. The spine of the species consists of 14 vertebrae connected to the dorsal fin, with another 10 vertebrae on the underside of the animal all with fine ridges lining them, common with other species in the family Trachurus. The dorsal fin is split into two sections, the front set consisting of eight bony spines, and the rear set having one bony spine and another 25 – 27 soft rays, depending on the size of the individual. All these fins are controlled by 3 muscles and many ligaments. The caudal fin on the side of jack mackerel is a much more complex structure of about 12 cm with a series of 6 bones, more than 20 soft rays projecting outwards and 6 muscles controlling its movement. The anal fin is made up of a collection of 3 spines with 26 – 30 soft rays coming from them. The jaw of the Japanese Jack Mackerel has a projected lower section and is lined with 4 separate segments of small conical teeth with medially bent tips which become larger moving towards the back of the jaw.

== Distribution and habitat ==
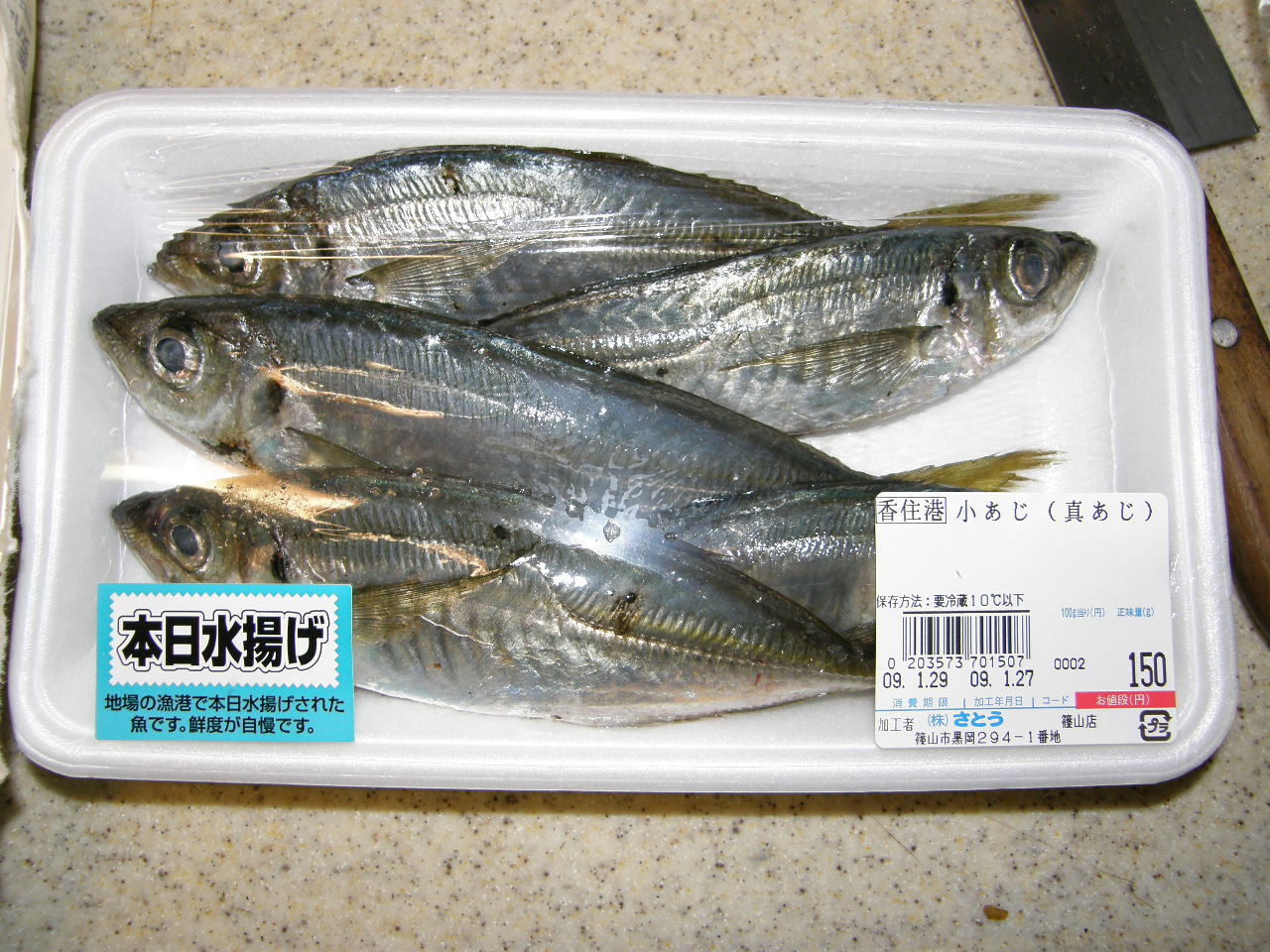
Japanese jack mackerel (aji) in commercial packaging for purchase

The Japanese jack mackerel generally lives in and around the East China Sea and Sea of Japan, in tropical regions between the coordinates of 46°N – 13°N and 105°E – 148°E. Although these are the main population grounds of the Japanese Jack Mackerel, they are also found in southern Japan, the Korean peninsula and in the Pacific Ocean off the coast of southeast Asia, primarily in Taiwan. These locations vary depending on the temperature of the water primarily, and thus vary with the seasons, with a higher density of Japanese Jack Mackerel in the southern and central china seas in the colder months. The ideal condition for the species ranges between 15 – 26 °C, with an ideal temperature of around 21 °C. With the temperature varying between the northern and southern areas of the East China Sea by around 3 – 5 °C, migration between these regions is a highly beneficial strategy for the species, especially during maturation ^{[6]}. There are many spawning grounds for the Japanese Jack Mackerel, all of which make use of the Kuroshio and Warm Tsushima Currents to migrate into the Japan or East China seas. The primary spawning grounds are along the warm coastal waters of Japan, with a large portion being around the region of Kyushu and southern Japan. The only other intensive spawning ground is the coastal waters of Taiwan, which also uses the Kuroshio current to move into the Eastern China and Japan seas. The transport of the juveniles from this spawning ground can take up to 40 days, whereas those spawned in and around the Japan coastal waters can take up to 2 months to reach the Eastern China Sea. The southern and central areas of the Eastern China Sea are the main areas in which juvenile Japanese Jack Mackerel are found due to the warmer waters. This higher temperature allows for a higher survival rate for the growing fish, with 80 – 95.8% of all Japanese Jack Mackerel found in the southern Eastern China Sea being juveniles. Due to the juveniles requiring a temperature above 19 °C to be able to develop and survive, vertical distribution is also very important and varies across the ages of the species. Juveniles under the age of 1 year old are not found anywhere below 50 m deep and thrive in the 20 – 50 m depth range due to the higher temperatures. Once mature, Japanese Jack Mackerels can be found at depths reaching up to 275 m.

== Biology and ecology ==
=== Life cycle ===
The life cycle of the Japanese jack mackerel starts in the late winter and tend to spawn around late April to early July, as water temperatures begin to rise allowing larvae and juveniles to thrive. as an egg 0.87 – 0.9mm in diameter with a light brown oil globule 0.17 – 0.22mm in diameter which constitutes the yolk of the egg. The location for spawning is dictated by several factors including phytoplankton productivity and migrating ability, but primarily temperature. The eggs are Pelagic, therefore float freely through the open sea and continue to do so as larvae. Once hatched, the larvae are 2.3 – 2.5mm in length and continue to carry the yolk sack beyond the anterior margin of the head. This continues until the 4th day after hatching where the yolk sack is completely absorbed. Development continues for 29 days before reaching the juvenile stage where the dorsal, pelvic, and anal rays and fins are developed, and the body is elongated to around 10 – 13 cm. Throughout the juvenile stages, scutes and scales fully develop as well as rays on the pectoral and caudal fins until reaching full maturity at around 60 days after hatching and reaching an average length of around 35 cm.

=== Feeding ===
As a juvenile, the Japanese jack mackerel mainly feeds on zooplankton, drift algae and flotsam throughout its developmental phases. Throughout maturity, it feeds on a much wider variety of species, although it mostly feeds on copepods, which are small crustaceans normally 1 – 2 mm in size. Additionally, the Japanese Jack Mackerel feeds on small shrimp or other small fish. The species normally hunts in large schools but in the case of individuals residing in reefs, they have been documented accompanying jellyfish for both feeding and protective purposes. The jellyfish are not a part of the jack mackerel's diet, but they rather use the jellyfish as a method for food collection and a way to hide from predators when not a part of a larger school.

=== Threats ===
As larvae and juveniles, the main threat posed to Japanese jack mackerel are the larger fish which feed on the vulnerable developing fish, as it lacks the mobility of a mature individual. As a mature adult, the Jack Mackerel is hunted by other pelagic species such as tuna, sea lions, sharks, and dolphins. Additionally, sea birds pose a great threat to both mature and juvenile Japanese Jack mackerel, as juveniles stay closer to the surface and adults venture to shallow waters to occasionally feed.

== Human interactions ==
=== Food ===
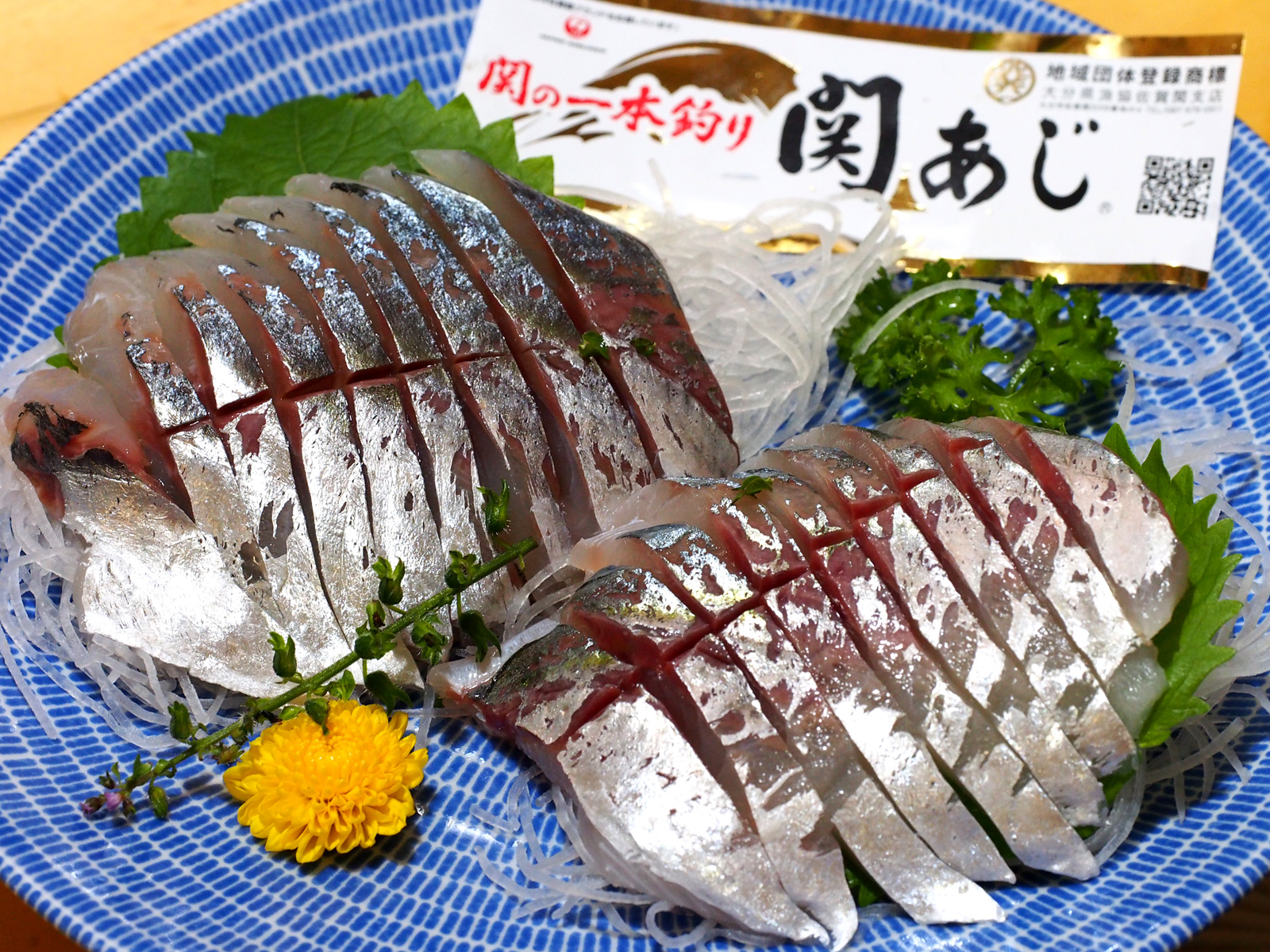
Japanese jack mackerel sashimi

The Japanese jack mackerel is a fish predominantly caught using trawls, purse seines, traps, and on line gear. Due to the overfishing and exploitation of wild populations of Japanese Jack Mackerel and their major role in ocean ecosystems, annual catching limits have been applied since 1997. This limitation has seen a drastic decrease in Jack Mackerel yields from up to 550,000 tons/year down to between 210,000 – 330,000 tons/year. Most of the fish used commercially and for food globally is caught in the wild, with only a small percentage being bred through aquaculture productions. Aquaculture of the Japanese Jack Mackerel, similarly, capture production has dropped drastically over the year, with now less than 1000 tons/year being produced, compared to the 7000 tons produced in the early 1990s.

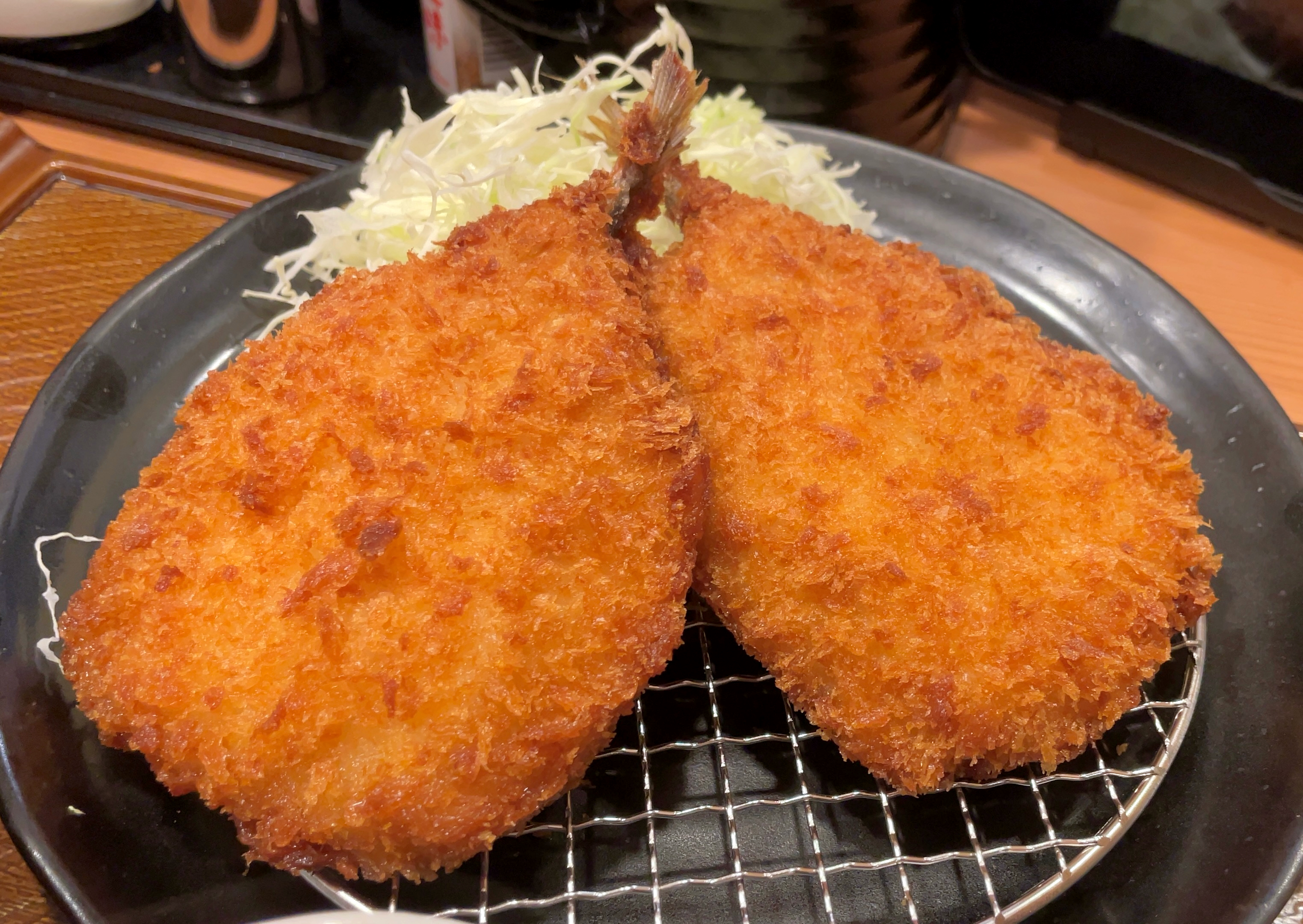
In Japan, horse mackerel is often deep-fried with panko

Japanese jack mackerel are used in a few ways once caught and are generally canned for use in various dishes or turned into fish meal. Some traditional Japanese dishes use jack mackerel as a key ingredient; it is commonly prepared as a form of furai (aji-furai あじフライ), salt-grilled (shioyaki-aji 塩焼きあじ), or used raw in sushi or as sashimi. In Korean cuisine, the jack mackerel is similarly used deep fried or grilled, and occasionally used in soups.

Capture (blue) and aquaculture (green) production of Japanese jack mackerel (Trachurus japonicus) in thousand tonnes from 1950 to 2022, as reported by the FAO

=== Conservation ===
In the 1960s peak yields of Japanese jack mackerel were caught of around 550,000 tons/year, but before the 1970s this number decreased to around 200,000 tons/year which was an indicator of overfishing. In the early 1980s, less than 100,000 tons/year were caught, and the aquaculture production of jack mackerel began to try and compensate for this loss of yield. This decrease in capture production led to a catching limit being applied in 1997, which stabilized the capture rate to around 210,000 – 330,00 tons/year. Special conservation efforts have been put in place in key spawning grounds of the jack mackerel including the Uwa Sea and Bungo Channel among the southern islands of Japan. This was put in place in 2013 and was a direct response to lowered catch yields and higher volumes of juveniles being captured between 2004 and 2013.

=== Culture ===
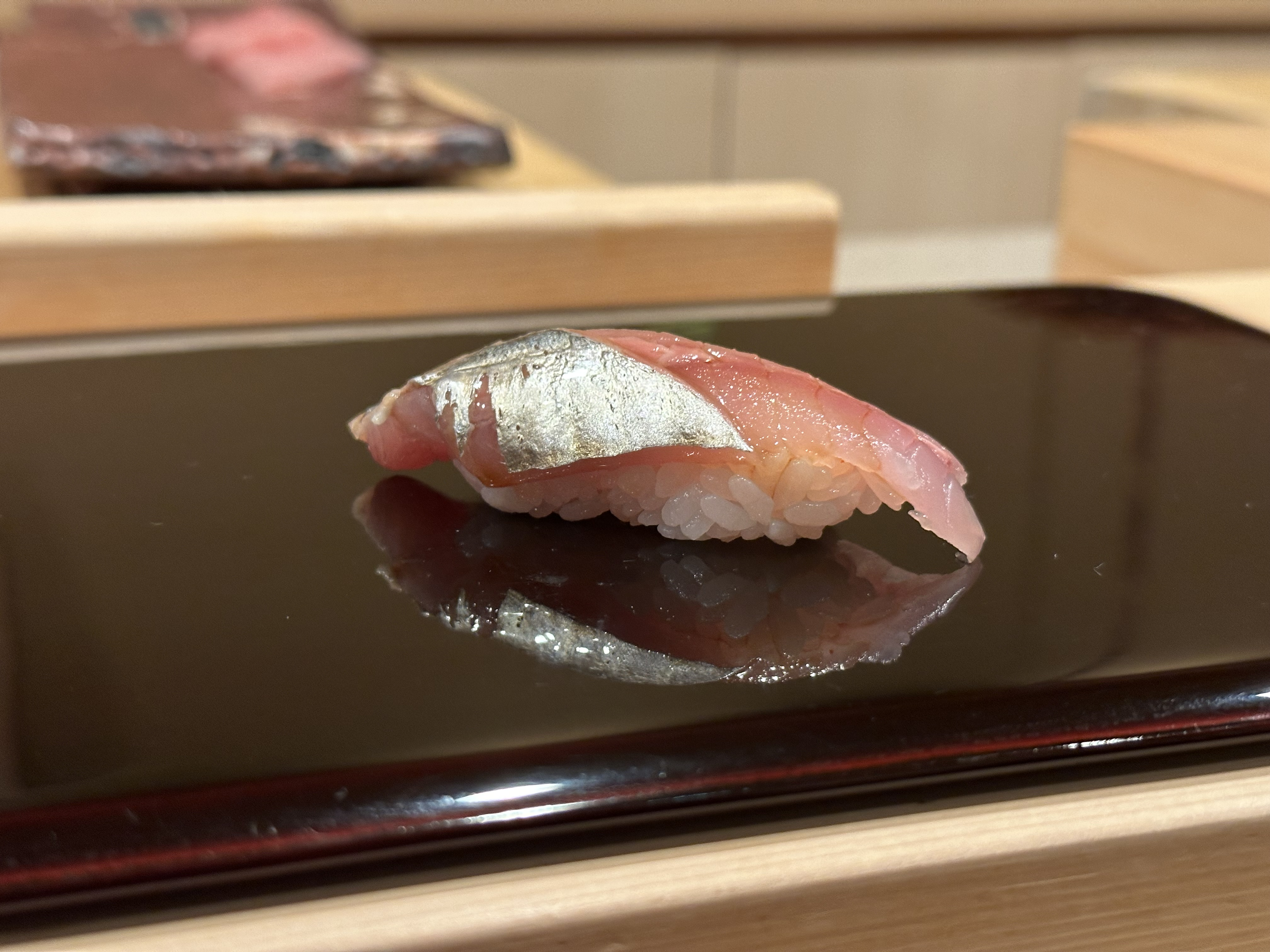
As sushi

Although not a strong cultural icon, the Japanese jack mackerel is used in a large portion of both Japanese and Korean dishes and are an important global export for Japanese fisheries. Additionally, due to the spawning grounds being tied to the Japanese coastal waters, efforts have been made by Japanese fisheries to prevent their exploitation.

=== Scad fishing ===
Scad are very popular seawater game fish highly prized especially by fishermen, because they generally put up a good fight when caught with a hook and line. As Scad are predatory fish, lure fishing (which use replica baits called lures to imitate live prey) is the predominant form of sport fishing involving Scad, although traditional bait fishing techniques using floats and/or sinkers (particularly with moving live baits such as baitfish, krill or shrimp) are also successful.

It is recommended that when fishing for Scad, that the fisher(s) should use line in the 1–5 lb test for Scad. It is also recommended to use a hook size 8-5 for Scad of all kind. Scad, tend to like ragworms, minnows, or cut bait.

== Phylogeny ==
The Japanese jack mackerel belongs to the family Carangidae which is a family of ray-finned fish such as jacks, pompanos, runners, and scads. All species in this family have 2 or more dorsal fins with 15 – 31 rays coming from each of the caudal, anal, and dorsal fins. The Genus Trachurus is a group of Jack Mackerels and Saurels which are derived from the Greek word trachys meaning "rough" and oura meaning "tail". The Japanese Jack Mackerel has been found to be more genetically similar to those under the family Scombridae, a family of mackerels, tuna, swordfish and dolphinfish. Despite this, Trachurus Japonicus remains in the family Carangidae due to strong morphological differences between the families
