= List of Jeju dishes =

The following dishes are primarily associated with the cuisine of Jeju Island, South Korea.

== Main dishes ==
- Japgokbap, (잡곡밥), made with multiple grains
- Saengseon guksu, (생선국수), noodles made with fish
- Memil kalguksu, (메밀칼국수), noodle dish made with buckwheat
- Gogi-guksu, (고기국수), pork-based noodle soup
- Memil jeobaegi, (메밀저배기), made with buckwheat
- Memil mandu, (메밀만두), mandu (dumpling) made with a buckwheat covering
- Gontteok guk, (곤떡국), made with tteok (rice cakes)

=== Porridge ===
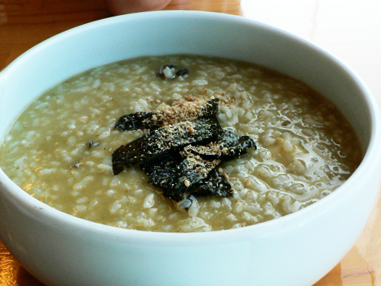
Jeonbokjuk, abalone porridge

- Memil beombeok, (메밀범벅), thick porridge made with buckwheat and other grains
- Haemuljuk, (해물죽), porridge made with seafood
- Jeonbokjuk, (전복죽), porridge made with abalone
- Okdomjuk, (옥돔), porridge made with tilefish
- Gingijuk, (깅이(게)), porridge made with crabs
- Chogijuk, (초기죽), porridge made with shiitake
- Dakjuk, (닭죽), porridge made with chicken
- Maeyeoksaejuk, (매역새죽), porridge made with young wakame
- Bomaljuk, (보말죽), porridge made with buckwheat Omphalius rusticus

== Challyu ==
- Gosari guk, (고사릿국), made with fernbrake
- Tot naengguk, (톳냉국)
- Pork yukgaejang, (돼지고기육개장), spicy soup made with pork
- Doenjang jjigae, (된장찌개), jjigae made with fermented soybean paste
- Bokjaengi jijimi, (복쟁이지짐이)
- Sangeo jijimi, (상어지짐이)
- Obunjaengi jjim, (오분쟁이찜)
- Jari jijimi, (자리지짐이)
- Dwaejigogi jorim, (돼지고기조림)

=== Grilled dishes ===
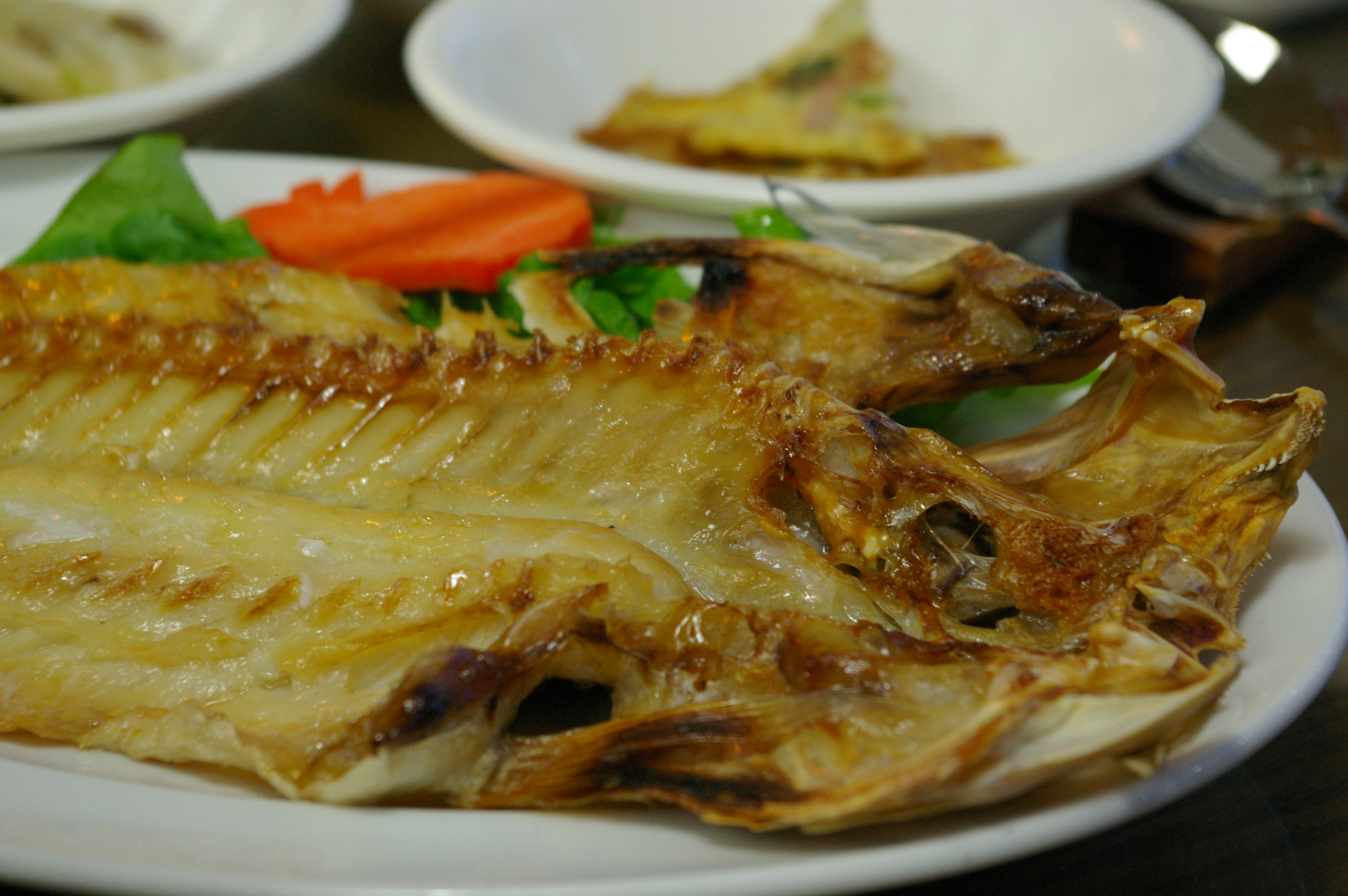
Okdom gui, grilled Tilefish

- Okdom gui, (옥돔구이), grilled Tilefish
- Dwaejigogi gui, (돼지고기구이), made with pork
- Bollak gui, (볼락구이)
- Sangeopo gui, (상어포구이), made with dried shark fillet

=== Pancakes ===
- Sangeo sanjeok, (상어산적), made with shark
- Gyeoran jeon, (계란전), made with eggs
- Gosari jeon, (고사리전)
- Chogi jeon, or called pyogo jeon (초기전, 표고전), made with shiitake
- Kkwong jeok, (꿩적), made with pheasant meat
- Memilmuk jijimi , (메밀묵지짐이)
- Kkwong jijimi, (꿩지짐이), made with pheasant meat

=== Pickles ===
- Huchutip jangajji, (후춧잎장아찌), pickle made with pepper leaves
- Putgochu oijangajji, (풋고추오이장아찌), pickle made with green chili pepper and cucumber in soy sauce

=== Raw dishes ===
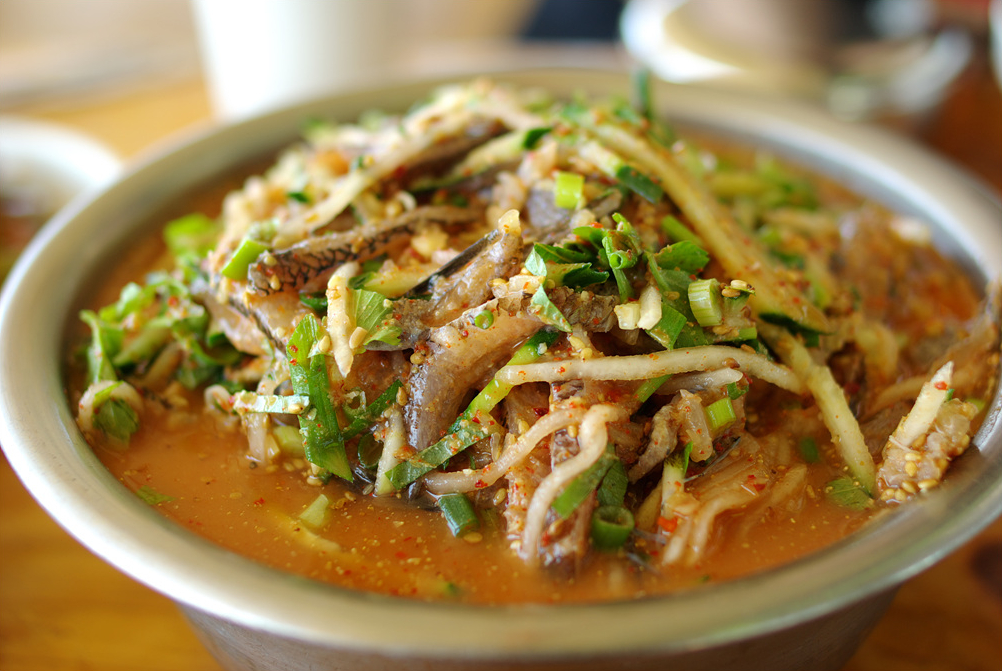
Jari mulhoe - Sliced raw damselfish with spicy sauce

- Jarihoe, (자리회)), made with damselfish
- Jari mulhoe, (자리물회), made with damselfish
- Jari ganghoe, (자리강회)
- Jeonbok sorahoe, (전복소라회)
- Molmang hoe, (몰망회)
- Ojingeo hoe, (오징어회), sliced raw squid made with squid
- Bigye hoe, (비계회)
- Dwaeji saekkihoe, (돼지새끼회)

=== Sauteed vegetables ===
- Yangae muchim, (양에무침)
- Totnamul, (톳나물)

=== Wraps ===
- Nalmiyeok ssam, (날미역쌈)
- Naldasima ssam, (날다시마쌈)
- Kongnip ssam, (콩잎쌈)

=== Kimchi ===
- Jeonbok kimchi, (전복김치)
- Dongji kimchi, (동지김치)
- Haemul kimchi, (해물김치)
- Nabak kimchi, (나박김치)

=== Dried dishes ===
- Dasima twigak, (다시마 튀각)
- Gajuk bugak, (가죽부각)
- Kkaetip bugak, (깻잎부각)
- Suae, (수애, 순대)
- Cheongmuk, (청묵(메밀묵))

== Tteok ==
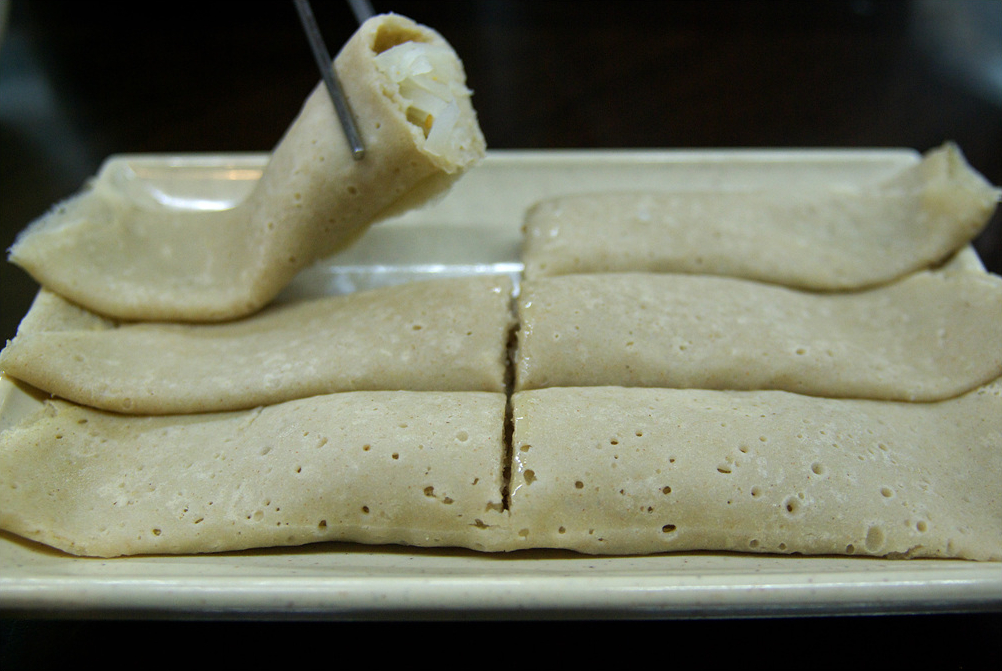
Bingtteok

- Bingtteok, (빙떡), tteok made with buckwheat
- Banchalgon tteok, (반찰곤떡)
- Dal tteok, (달떡, literally "moon tteok"), tteok made by pounding rice and shaped into a circle like a full moon. It is also a local specialty of Hamgyong province.
- Dodom tteok, (도돔떡), made with rice
- Chim tteok or called jopssal sirutteok, (침떡, 좁쌀시루떡)
- Chajopssal tteok, (차좁쌀떡), made with Italian millet
- Omaegi tteok, (오매기떡), tteok made with Italian millet and shaped into a ring
- Dollae tteok, (돌래떡), made with Italian millet flour or buckwheat flour.
- Sok tteok, (속떡, 쑥떡), tteok made by pounding rice and boiled ssuk (Artemisia indica).
- Memil bukkumi, (메밀부꾸미), made by pan-frying pieces of dough made with buckwheat and stuffed with a sweeten filling.
- Ppadaegi tteok or called gamje tteok, (빼대기, 감제떡), tteok made with powder of dried sweet potato and shaped like songpyeon
- Sangae tteok, (상애떡), tteok made with wheat flour and makgeolli (rice wine)

== Desserts ==
- Yakgwa, (약과), a variety of yumil-gwa in hangwa, Korean traditional confectionery, made with honey and wheat flour
- Dak yeot, (닭엿), yeot (candy) made with glutinous millet and chicken
- Kkwog yeot, (꿩엿), yeot made with glutinous millet and pheasant meat
- Dwaejigogi yeot, (돼지고기엿), yeot made with glutinous millet and pork
- Haneulaegi yeot, (하늘애기엿), yeot made with glutinous millet and Trichosanthes kirilowii
- Hobak yeot, (호박엿), yeot made with pumpkin
- Bori yeot, (보리엿), yeot made with barley
- Maneul yeot, (마늘엿), yeot made with glutinous millet and garlic

== Non-alcoholic beverages ==
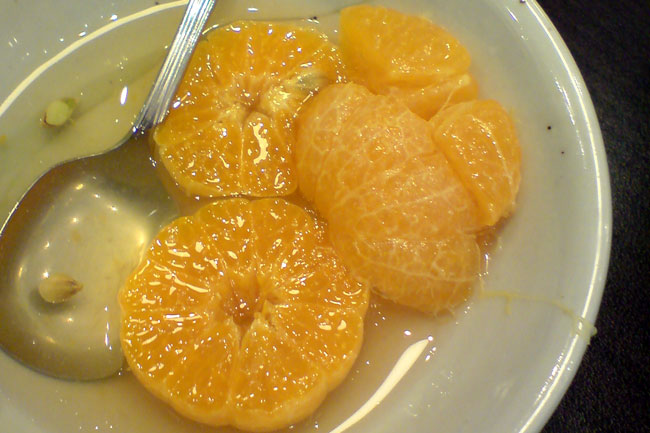
Milgam hwachae, Mandarin orange punch

- Sulgamju, (술감주), made with chilled steamed rice and nuruk (a fermentation starter)
- Milgam hwachae, (밀감화채), hwachae (punch) made with Mandarin orange
- Jagulcha, (자굴차), made with dried leaves of Albizia julibrissin
- Soyeopcha, (소엽차), made with dried Limnophila aromatica

== See also ==
- Korean cuisine
- Korean royal court cuisine
- Korean temple cuisine
- List of Korean dishes
