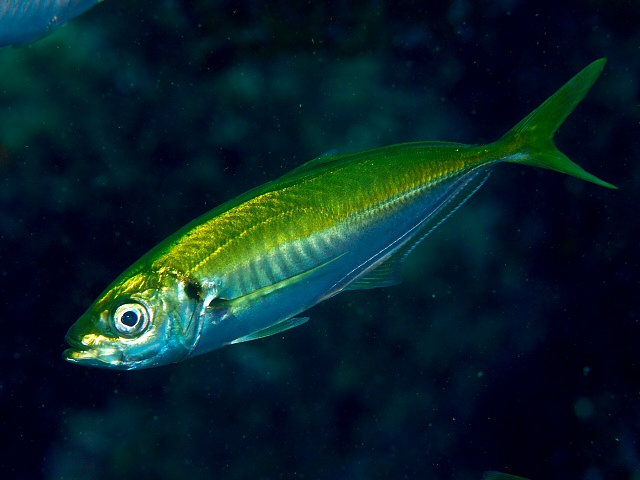
- Japanese horse mackerel, Trachurus japonicus

Scientific classification
- Kingdom: Animalia
- Phylum: Chordata
- Class: Actinopterygii
- Division: Teleostei
- Order: Carangiformes
- Suborder: Carangoidei
- Family: Carangidae
- Subfamily: Caranginae
- Genus: Trachurus; Rafinesque, 1810

Type species
- Scomber trachurus Linnaeus, 1758

Synonyms
- Branchialepes Fowler, 1938; Suareus Dardignac & Vincent, 1958

= Trachurus =

Jack mackerels Temporal range: Eocene to Present

Genus of ray-finned fishes

Jack mackerels or saurels are marine ray-finned fish in the genus Trachurus of the family Carangidae. The name of the genus derives from the Greek words trachys ("rough") and oura ("tail"). Some species, such as T. murphyi, are harvested in purse seine nets, and overfishing (harvesting beyond sustainable levels) has sometimes occurred.

It is often used in Japanese cuisine, where it is called aji, in Turkish cuisine, where it is called istavrit, and in Portuguese cuisine, where it is called carapau.

== Species ==
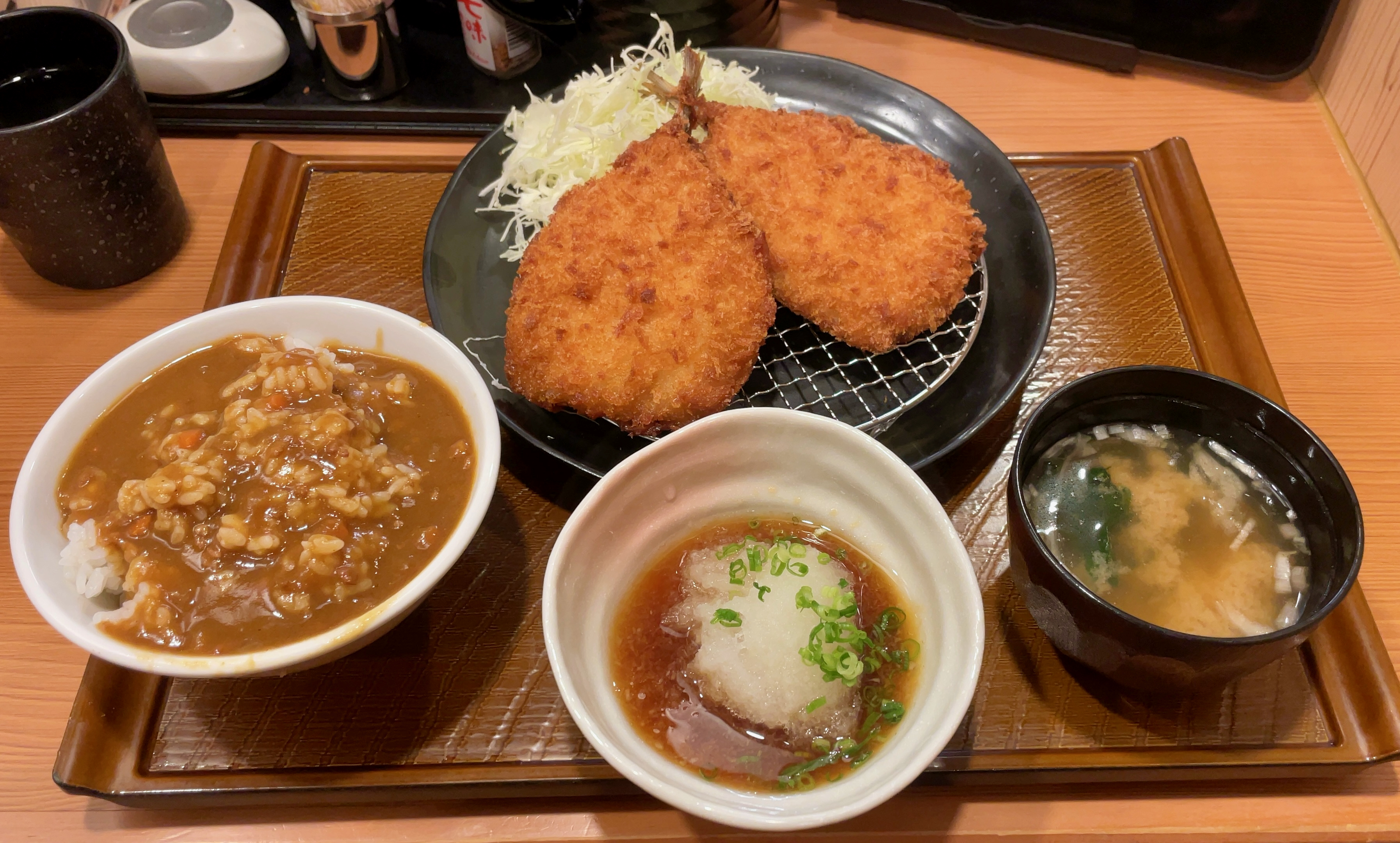
Fried Japanese jack mackerel as part of a teishoku meal, with miso soup and curry

The genus Trachurus was defined in 1810 by Constantine Samuel Rafinesque-Schmaltz, who called the type species Trachurus saurus. Taxonomists later determined that T. saurus was in fact the same species as one described earlier as Scomber trachurus, defined in 1758 by Carl Linnaeus. Under the rules of binomial nomenclature, that species is now known as Trachurus trachurus, commonly known as the Atlantic horse mackerel.

The currently recognized species in this genus are:

Image	Scientific name	Common name	Distribution
	Trachurus capensis Castelnau, 1861	Cape horse mackerel	southeastern Atlantic from the Gulf of Guinea to eastern South Africa.
	Trachurus declivis (Jenyns, 1841)	greenback horse mackerel	western and southern Australia, and around New Zealand
	Trachurus delagoa Nekrasov, 1970	African scad	south western Indian Ocean.
	Trachurus indicus Nekrasov, 1966	Arabian scad	Red Sea and Somalia through the Persian Gulf east as far as Pakistan and south to the Saya de Malha Bank.
	Trachurus japonicus (Temminck & Schlegel, 1844)	Japanese jack mackerel	Japan, apart from Okinawa Island
	Trachurus lathami Nichols, 1920	rough scad	eastern coasts of North and South America and the Gulf of Mexico
	Trachurus longimanus (Norman, 1935)	Crozet scad	east Atlantic and south western Indian Oceans
	Trachurus mediterraneus (Steindachner, 1868)	Mediterranean horse mackerel	eastern Atlantic from Bay of Biscay to Mauritania, including the Mediterranean Sea.
	Trachurus murphyi Nichols, 1920	Chilean jack mackerel	south Pacific off the coasts of Chile and Peru, around New Zealand and south Australia, and in a band across the open ocean in between
	Trachurus novaezelandiae J. Richardson, 1843	yellowtail horse mackerel	Australia and New Zealand
	Trachurus picturatus (S. Bowdich, 1825)	blue jack mackerel	the Bay of Biscay to south Morocco and the western Mediterranean.
	Trachurus symmetricus (Ayres, 1855)	Pacific jack mackerel	western coast of North America, ranging from Alaska in the north to the Gulf of California in the south
	Trachurus trachurus (Linnaeus, 1758)	Atlantic horse mackerel	eastern Atlantic Ocean, the Mediterranean Sea and Sea of Marmara and the Black Sea.
	Trachurus trecae Cadenat, 1950	Cunene horse mackerel	eastern Atlantic from Morocco south to Angola
