= Crozet scad =

Conservation status
- Least Concern (IUCN 3.1)

Scientific classification
- Kingdom: Animalia
- Phylum: Chordata
- Class: Actinopterygii
- Order: Carangiformes
- Suborder: Carangoidei
- Family: Carangidae
- Genus: Trachurus
- Species: T. longimanus

Binomial name
- Trachurus longimanus (Norman, 1935)

Synonyms
- Decapterus longimanus Norman, 1935; Trachurus picturatus aleevi Rytov & Razumovskaya, 1984; Trachurus aleevi Rytov & Razumovskaya, 1984

Species of ray-finned fish

The Crozet scad (Trachurus longimanus) is a species of jack mackerel from the family Carangidae, the jacks, pompanos and trevallies, which is found off oceanic islands and over banks and sea mountains in the south east Atlantic and south western Indian Oceans.
