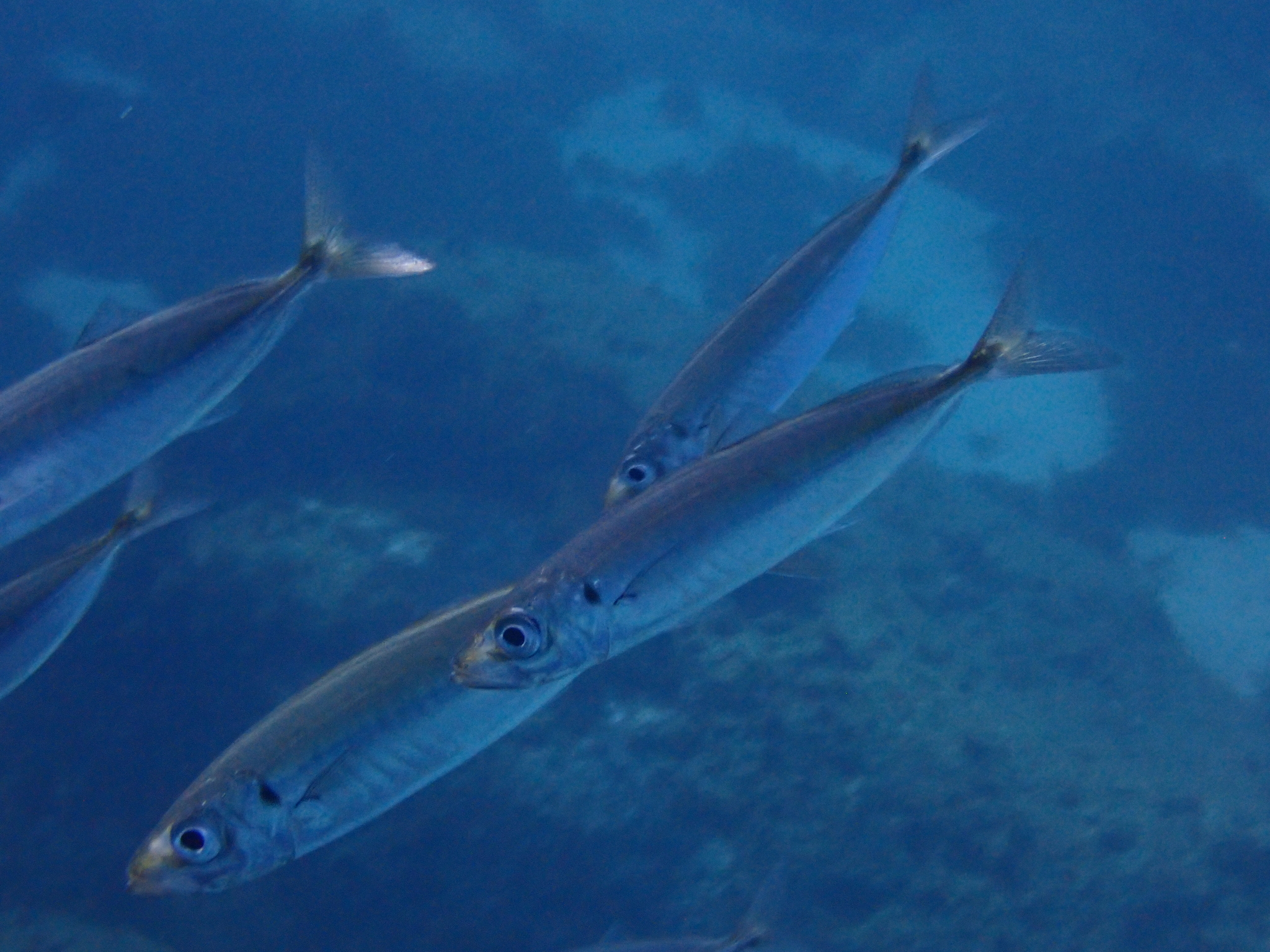

Conservation status
- Least Concern (IUCN 3.1)

Scientific classification
- Kingdom: Animalia
- Phylum: Chordata
- Class: Actinopterygii
- Order: Carangiformes
- Suborder: Carangoidei
- Family: Carangidae
- Genus: Trachurus
- Species: T. picturatus

Binomial name
- Trachurus picturatus (S. Bowdich, 1825)

Synonyms
- Trachurus suareus (Risso in Cuvier and Valenciennes, 1833)

= Blue jack mackerel =

Species of ray-finned fish

The blue jack mackerel (Trachurus picturatus) is a species of mackerel-like fish in the family Carangidae. Their maximum reported length is 60 cm, with a common length of 25 cm. They are coastal fish found at depths to 370 m off the Bay of Biscay to south Morocco and the western Mediterranean.
