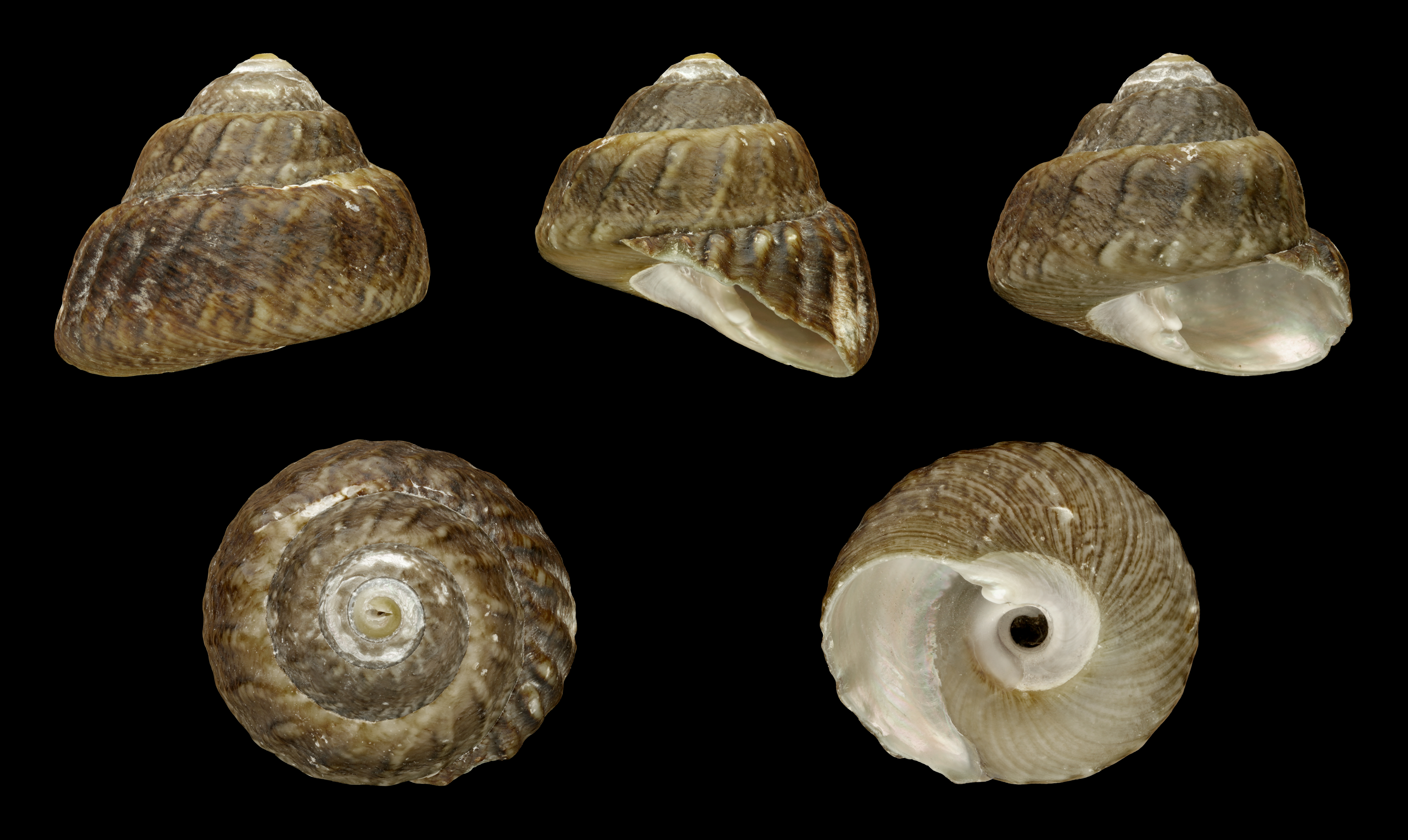
- Shell of Tegula rustica

Scientific classification
- Kingdom: Animalia
- Phylum: Mollusca
- Class: Gastropoda
- Subclass: Vetigastropoda
- Order: Trochida
- Superfamily: Trochoidea
- Family: Tegulidae
- Genus: Tegula
- Species: T. rustica

Binomial name
- Tegula rustica (Gmelin, 1791)

Synonyms
- Chlorostoma rustica Gmelin, 1791 (original description); Omphalius rusticus (Gmelin, 1791); Trochus (Livona) ephebocostalis Grabau & S. G. King, 1928; Trochus ephebocostalis Grabau & S. G. King, 1928; Trochus rusticus (Gmelin, 1791)

= Tegula rustica =

Species of gastropod

Tegula rustica is a species of sea snail, a marine gastropod mollusk in the family Tegulidae.

== Description ==
The height of the shell attains 33 mm, its diameter is 32 mm. The umbilicate, heavy, solid shell has a conic shape. It is chocolate-colored or brownish-olivaceous. The conical spire is more or less elevated. The suture is distinctly impressed. The 6–7 whorls are moderately convex or nearly flat, sometimes tumid just below the sutures, and either smooth or longitudinally plicate. The folds are usually obsolescent, and visible only for a short distance below the sutures. The shell is spirally obsoletely striate. The body whorl is obtusely angular at the periphery. The base of the shell is nearly flat. The aperture is very oblique. The columella shows one or two teeth below, expanded above in a white callus, which half surrounds the narrow, deep circular umbilicus.

== Distribution ==
This marine species occurs off Japan.
