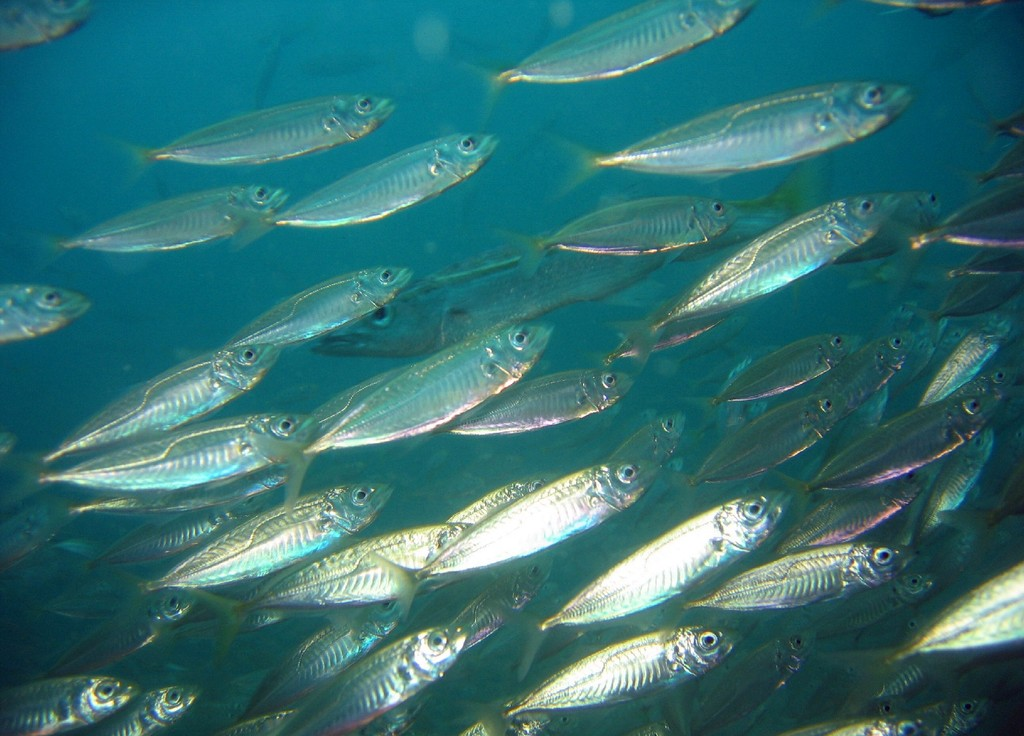

Conservation status
- Least Concern (IUCN 3.1)

Scientific classification
- Kingdom: Animalia
- Phylum: Chordata
- Class: Actinopterygii
- Division: Teleostei
- Order: Carangiformes
- Suborder: Carangoidei
- Family: Carangidae
- Genus: Trachurus
- Species: T. declivis

Binomial name
- Trachurus declivis (Jenyns, 1841)

Synonyms
- Caranx declivis Jenyns, 1841

= Greenback horse mackerel =

Species of fish

The greenback horse mackerel or greenback scad (Trachurus declivis) is a species of jack in the family Carangidae, found around western and southern Australia, and around New Zealand, from the surface to depths of 460 m. Its length is up to 64 cm.

Its common name derives from the legend that other smaller species of fish could ride on its back over great distances. It is an important commercial fish and sports fishing quarry although it has strong tasting flesh.

== Fisheries ==
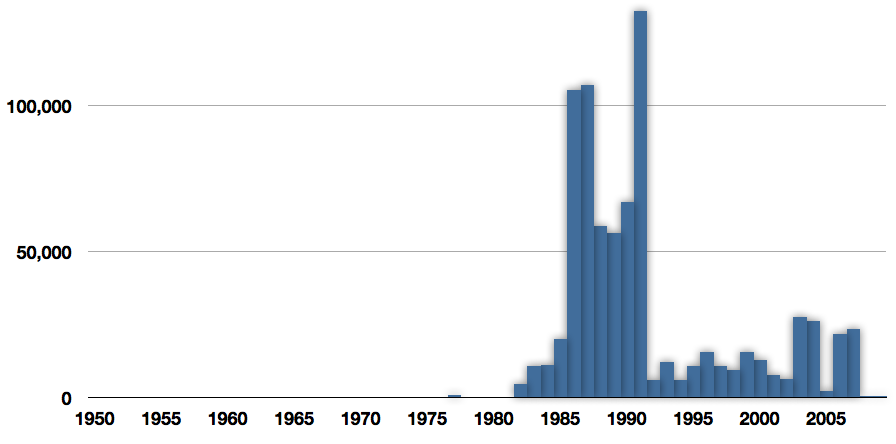
Commercial capture of greenback horse mackerel in tonnes from 1950 to 2009
