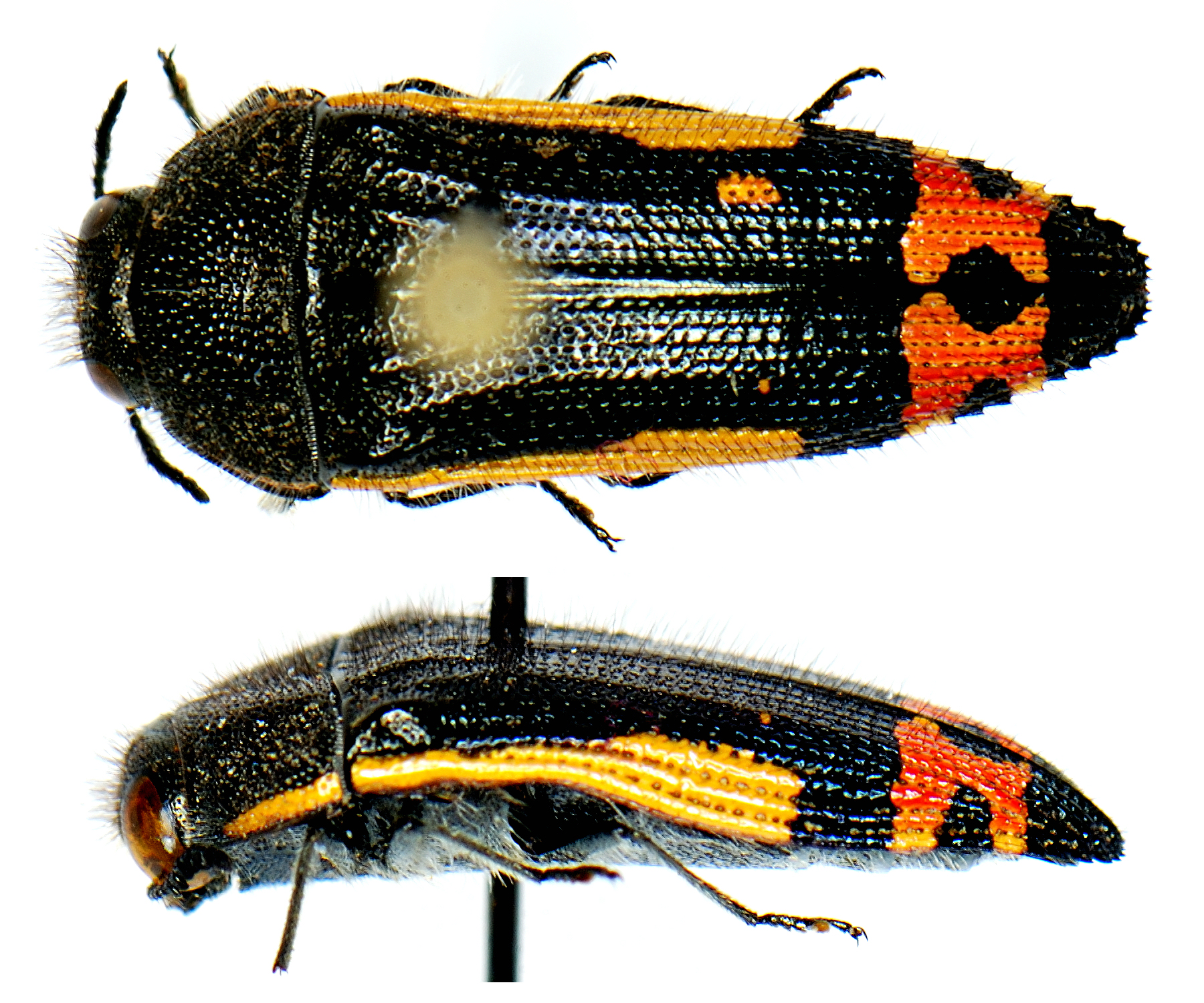

Scientific classification
- Kingdom: Animalia
- Phylum: Arthropoda
- Clade: Pancrustacea
- Class: Insecta
- Order: Coleoptera
- Suborder: Polyphaga
- Infraorder: Elateriformia
- Family: Buprestidae
- Genus: Acmaeodera
- Species: A. flavomarginata

Binomial name
- Acmaeodera flavomarginata (Gray, 1832)

= Acmaeodera flavomarginata =

Species of beetle

Acmaeodera flavomarginata is a species of metallic wood-boring beetle in the family Buprestidae. It is found in Central America, North America, and South America.

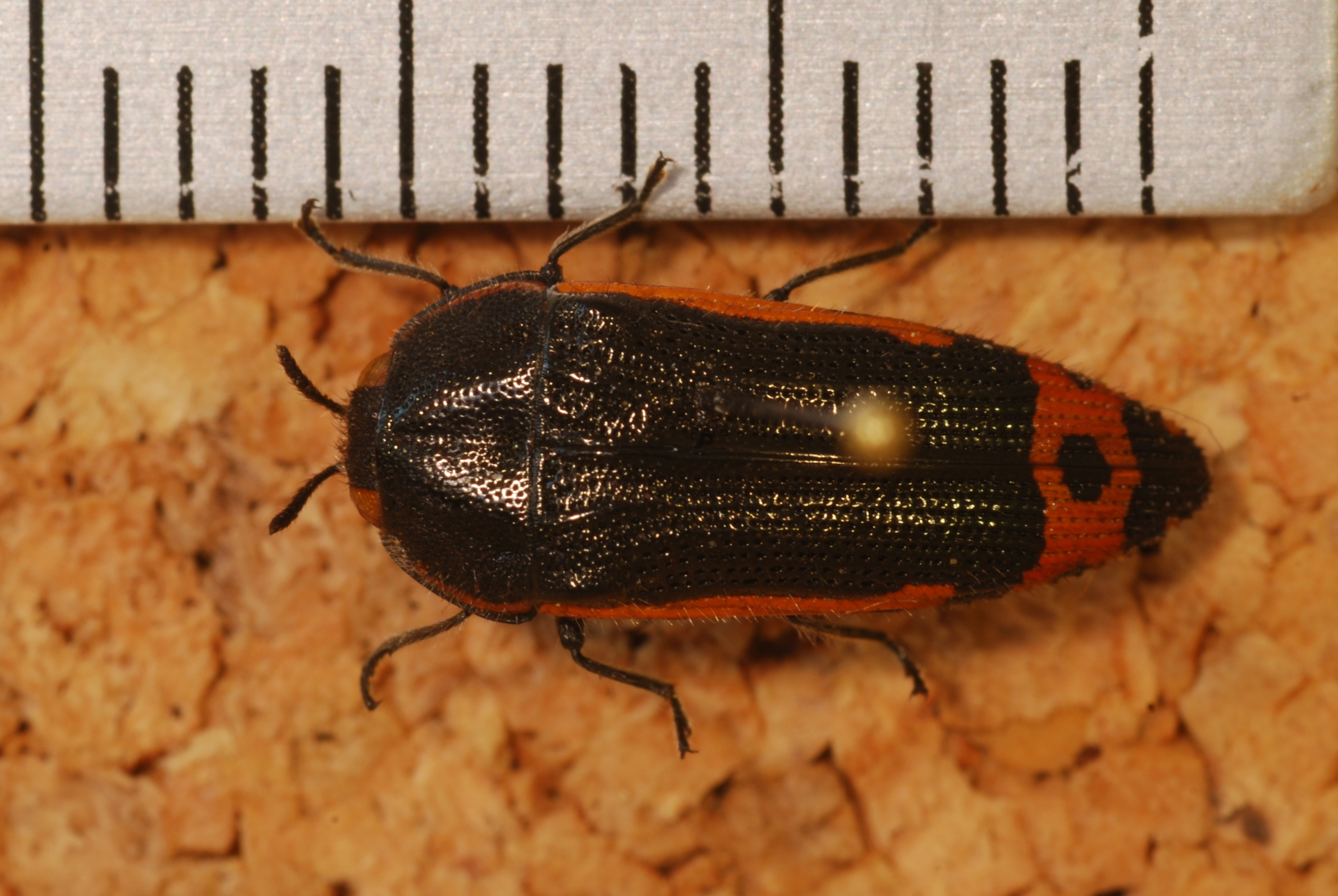
