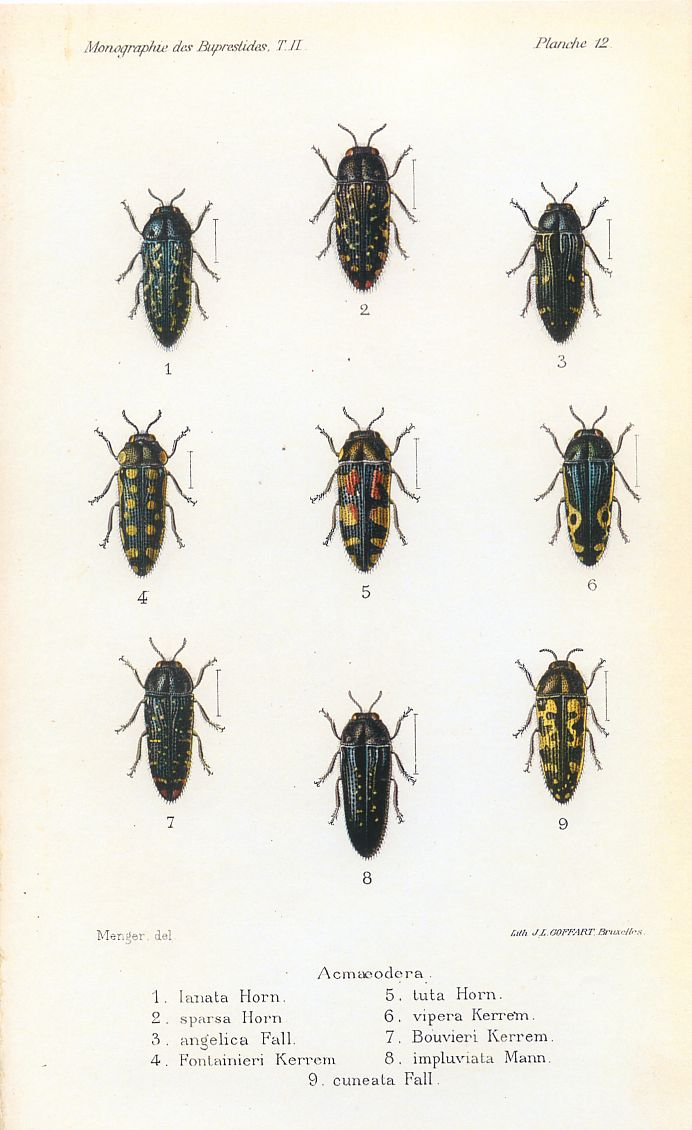

Scientific classification
- Kingdom: Animalia
- Phylum: Arthropoda
- Class: Insecta
- Order: Coleoptera
- Suborder: Polyphaga
- Infraorder: Elateriformia
- Family: Buprestidae
- Genus: Acmaeodera
- Species: A. pubiventris

Binomial name
- Acmaeodera pubiventris Horn, 1878

Synonyms
- Acmaeodera panocheae Westcott, 2001

= Acmaeodera pubiventris =

Species of beetle

Acmaeodera pubiventris is a species of metallic wood-boring beetle in the family Buprestidae. It is found in Central America and North America.

== Subspecies ==
These four subspecies belong to the species Acmaeodera pubiventris:

- Acmaeodera pubiventris lanata Horn, 1880
- Acmaeodera pubiventris panocheae Wescott, 2001
- Acmaeodera pubiventris pubiventris Horn, 1878
- Acmaeodera pubiventris yumae Knull, 1937
