= Acmaeodera mariposa =

Scientific classification
- Kingdom: Animalia
- Phylum: Arthropoda
- Class: Insecta
- Order: Coleoptera
- Suborder: Polyphaga
- Infraorder: Elateriformia
- Family: Buprestidae
- Genus: Acmaeodera
- Species: A. mariposa

Binomial name
- Acmaeodera mariposa Horn, 1878

Species of beetle

Acmaeodera mariposa is a species of metallic wood-boring beetle in the family Buprestidae. It is found in North America.

== Subspecies ==
These two subspecies belong to the species Acmaeodera mariposa:

- Acmaeodera mariposa dohrni Horn, 1878
- Acmaeodera mariposa mariposa Horn, 1878
