= Acmaeodera sinuata =

Scientific classification
- Domain: Eukaryota
- Kingdom: Animalia
- Phylum: Arthropoda
- Class: Insecta
- Order: Coleoptera
- Suborder: Polyphaga
- Infraorder: Elateriformia
- Family: Buprestidae
- Genus: Acmaeodera
- Species: A. sinuata

Binomial name
- Acmaeodera sinuata Van Dyke, 1919

Species of beetle

Acmaeodera sinuata is a species of metallic wood-boring beetle in the family Buprestidae. It is found in North America.

== Subspecies ==
These two subspecies belong to the species Acmaeodera sinuata:

- Acmaeodera sinuata sexnotata Van Dyke, 1919
- Acmaeodera sinuata sinuata Van Dyke, 1919
