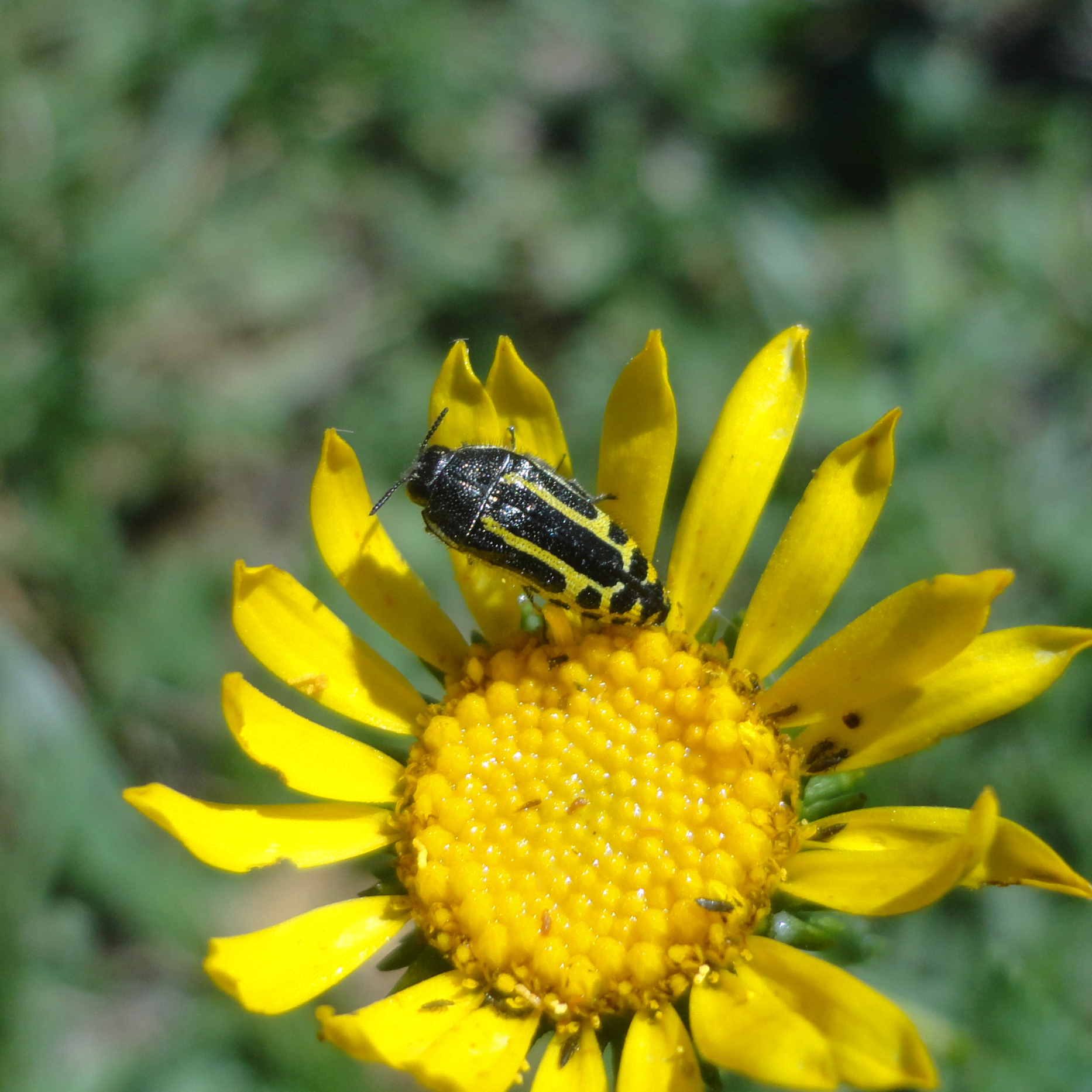

Scientific classification
- Domain: Eukaryota
- Kingdom: Animalia
- Phylum: Arthropoda
- Class: Insecta
- Order: Coleoptera
- Suborder: Polyphaga
- Infraorder: Elateriformia
- Family: Buprestidae
- Genus: Acmaeodera
- Species: A. scalaris

Binomial name
- Acmaeodera scalaris Mannerheim, 1837

Synonyms
- Acmaeodera semivittata LeConte, 1858

= Acmaeodera scalaris =

Species of beetle

Acmaeodera scalaris, the ladder buprestid, is a species of metallic wood-boring beetle in the family Buprestidae. It is found in Central America and North America.
