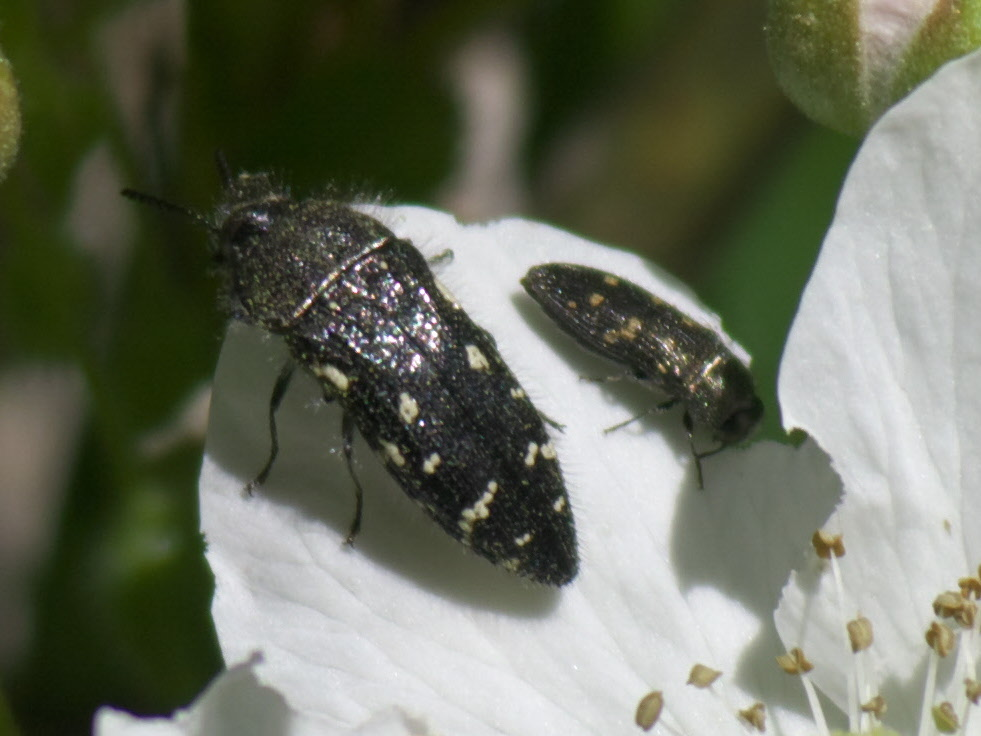

Scientific classification
- Kingdom: Animalia
- Phylum: Arthropoda
- Clade: Pancrustacea
- Class: Insecta
- Order: Coleoptera
- Suborder: Polyphaga
- Infraorder: Elateriformia
- Family: Buprestidae
- Genus: Acmaeodera
- Species: A. ornata

Binomial name
- Acmaeodera ornata (Fabricius, 1775)

Synonyms
- Acmaeodera dispar Gory, 1840; Acmaeodera quatuordecimspilota Obenberger, 1917

= Acmaeodera ornata =

Species of beetle

Acmaeodera ornata is a species of metallic wood-boring beetle in the family Buprestidae.

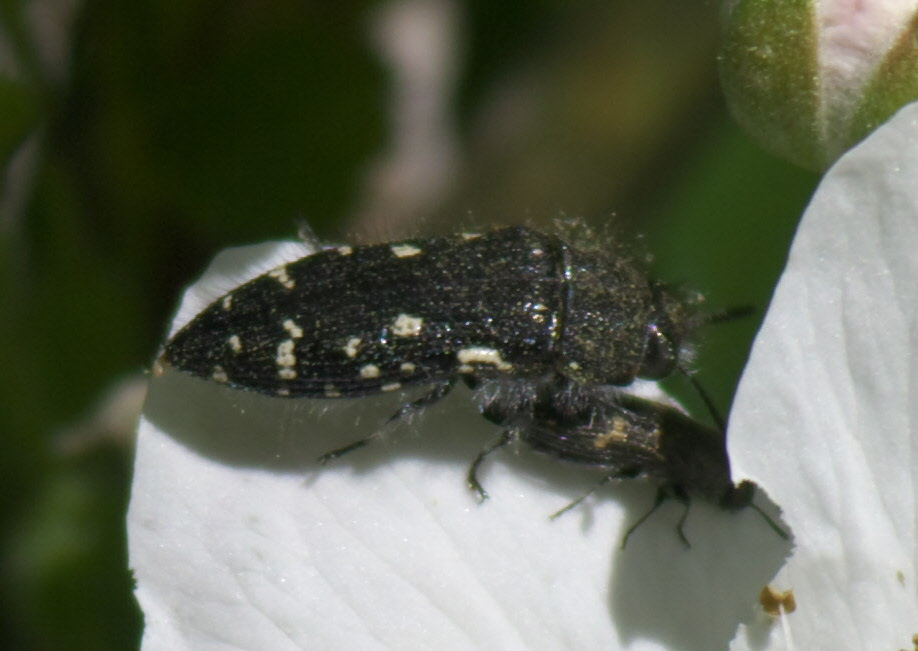
