= Acmaeodera latiflava =

Scientific classification
- Domain: Eukaryota
- Kingdom: Animalia
- Phylum: Arthropoda
- Class: Insecta
- Order: Coleoptera
- Suborder: Polyphaga
- Infraorder: Elateriformia
- Family: Buprestidae
- Genus: Acmaeodera
- Species: A. latiflava

Binomial name
- Acmaeodera latiflava Fall, 1907

Species of beetle

Acmaeodera latiflava is a species of metallic wood-boring beetle in the family Buprestidae. It is found in North America.

== Subspecies ==
These two subspecies belong to the species Acmaeodera latiflava:

- Acmaeodera latiflava latiflava Fall, 1907
- Acmaeodera latiflava lineipicta Fall, 1932
