= Acmaeodera consors =

Scientific classification
- Kingdom: Animalia
- Phylum: Arthropoda
- Class: Insecta
- Order: Coleoptera
- Suborder: Polyphaga
- Infraorder: Elateriformia
- Family: Buprestidae
- Genus: Acmaeodera
- Species: A. consors

Binomial name
- Acmaeodera consors Horn, 1878

Synonyms
- Acmaeodera perforata Cazier, 1940

Species of beetle

Acmaeodera consors is a species of metallic wood-boring beetle in the family Buprestidae. It is found in North America.
