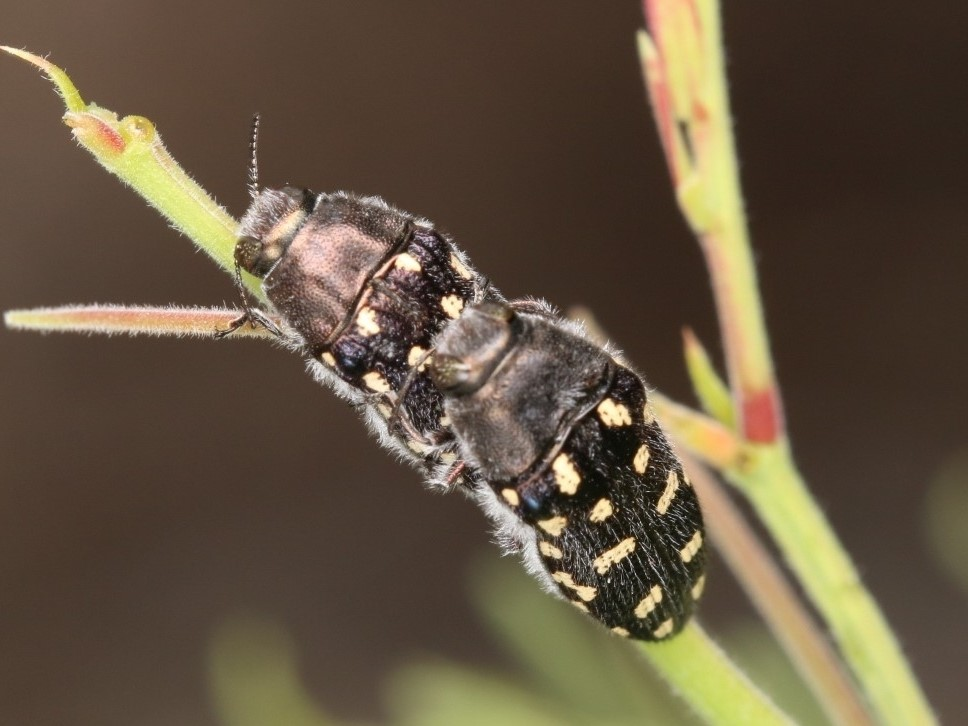
- Mating pair

Scientific classification
- Kingdom: Animalia
- Phylum: Arthropoda
- Class: Insecta
- Order: Coleoptera
- Suborder: Polyphaga
- Infraorder: Elateriformia
- Family: Buprestidae
- Genus: Acmaeodera
- Species: A. delumbis

Binomial name
- Acmaeodera delumbis Horn, 1894

= Acmaeodera delumbis =

Species of beetle

Acmaeodera delumbis is a species of metallic wood-boring beetle in the family Buprestidae. It is found in Central America and North America.
