= Acmaeodera flavopicta =

Scientific classification
- Domain: Eukaryota
- Kingdom: Animalia
- Phylum: Arthropoda
- Class: Insecta
- Order: Coleoptera
- Suborder: Polyphaga
- Infraorder: Elateriformia
- Family: Buprestidae
- Genus: Acmaeodera
- Species: A. flavopicta

Binomial name
- Acmaeodera flavopicta Waterhouse, 1889

Synonyms
- Acmaeodera falli Kerremans, 1902; Acmaeodera subcyanea Fall, 1899

Species of beetle

Acmaeodera flavopicta is a species of metallic wood-boring beetle in the family Buprestidae. It is found in Central America and North America.
