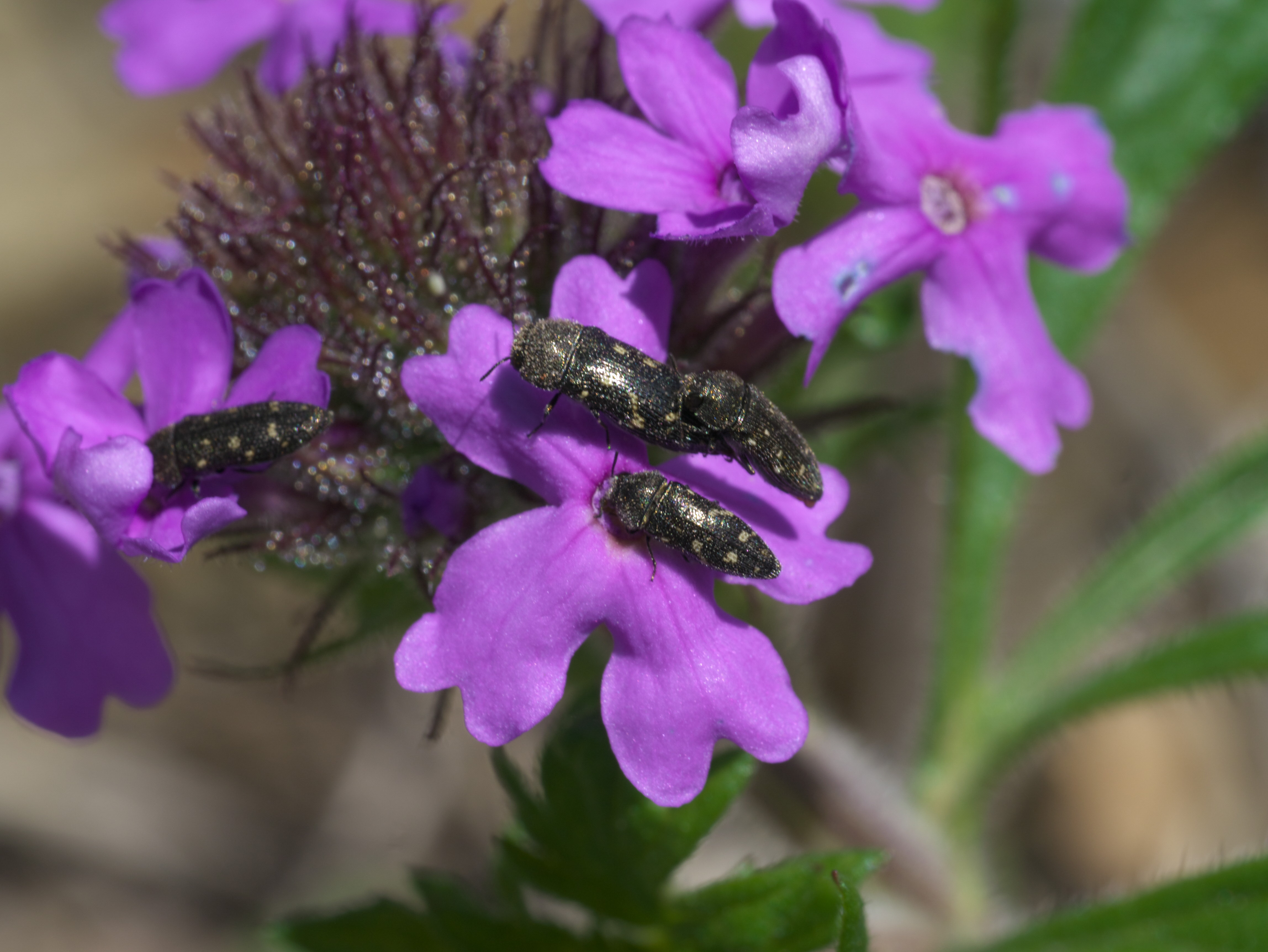

Scientific classification
- Domain: Eukaryota
- Kingdom: Animalia
- Phylum: Arthropoda
- Class: Insecta
- Order: Coleoptera
- Suborder: Polyphaga
- Infraorder: Elateriformia
- Family: Buprestidae
- Genus: Acmaeodera
- Species: A. tubulus

Binomial name
- Acmaeodera tubulus (Fabricius, 1801)

Synonyms
- Acmaeodera culta (Weber, 1801); Acmaeodera quatuordecimguttata (Fabricius, 1801)

= Acmaeodera tubulus =

Species of beetle

Acmaeodera tubulus is a species of metallic wood-boring beetle in the family Buprestidae. It is found in North America.
