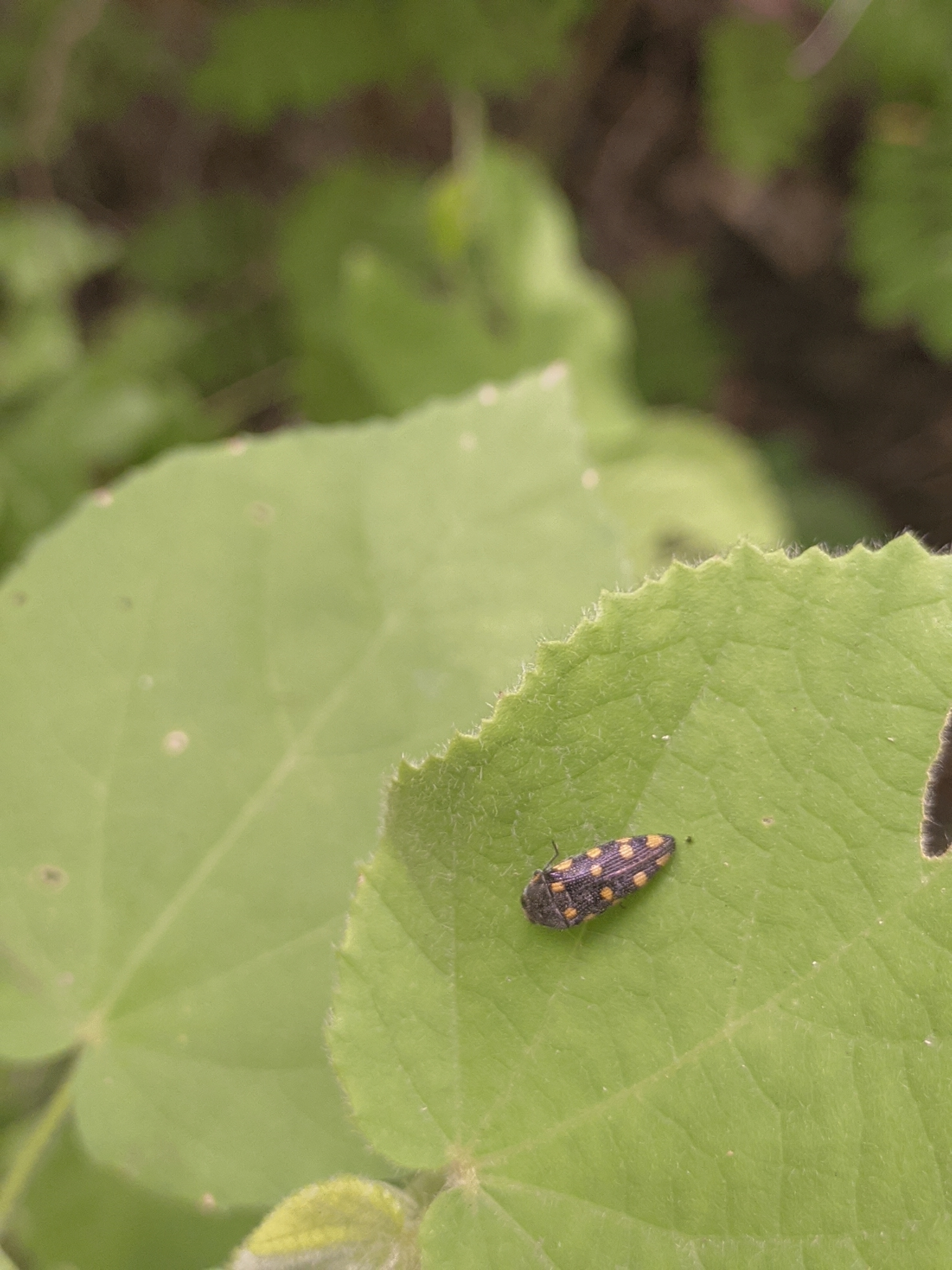
- Acmaeodera xanthosticta in Colombia. Source: (c) Jorge I. Merchán Mayorga, 2022 (CC BY-SA)

Scientific classification
- Domain: Eukaryota
- Kingdom: Animalia
- Phylum: Arthropoda
- Class: Insecta
- Order: Coleoptera
- Suborder: Polyphaga
- Infraorder: Elateriformia
- Family: Buprestidae
- Genus: Acmaeodera
- Species: A. xanthosticta

Binomial name
- Acmaeodera xanthosticta Laporte & Gory, 1835

Synonyms
- Acmaeodera amazonica Nonfried, 1895; Acmaeodera bisseptemguttata Marseul, 1867; Acmaeodera confusa Fisher, 1925

= Acmaeodera xanthosticta =

Species of beetle

Acmaeodera xanthosticta is a species of metallic wood-boring beetle in the family Buprestidae. It is found in the Caribbean Sea, North America, and South America.
