= Acmaeodera curtilata =

Scientific classification
- Kingdom: Animalia
- Phylum: Arthropoda
- Clade: Pancrustacea
- Class: Insecta
- Order: Coleoptera
- Suborder: Polyphaga
- Infraorder: Elateriformia
- Family: Buprestidae
- Genus: Acmaeodera
- Species: A. curtilata

Binomial name
- Acmaeodera curtilata Knull, 1941

Species of beetle

Acmaeodera curtilata is a species of metallic wood-boring beetle in the family Buprestidae. It is found in North America.
