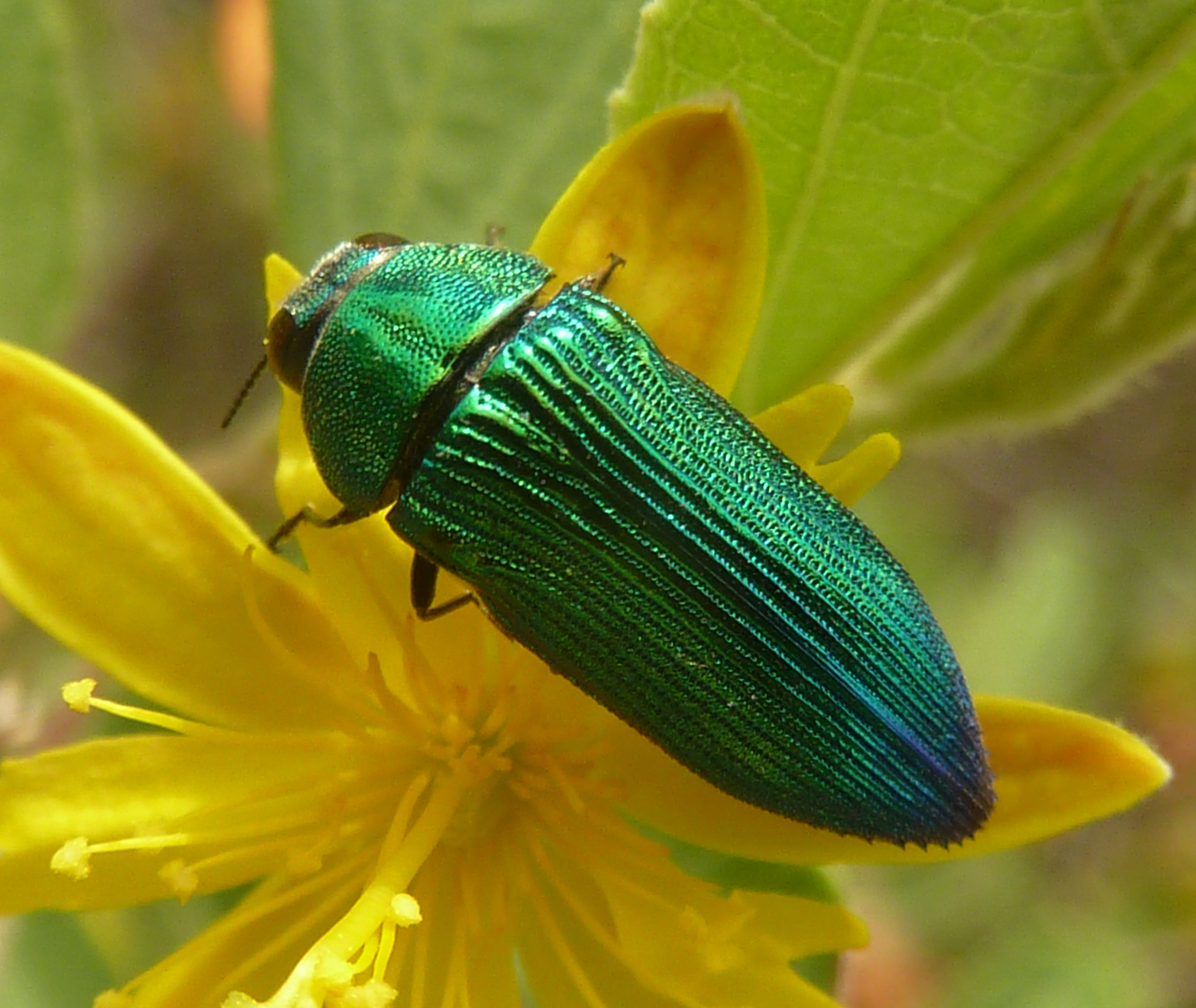
- female A. viridaenea on Grewia flava flower

Scientific classification
- Kingdom: Animalia
- Phylum: Arthropoda
- Class: Insecta
- Order: Coleoptera
- Suborder: Polyphaga
- Infraorder: Elateriformia
- Family: Buprestidae
- Tribe: Acmaeoderini
- Genus: Acmaeodera; Eschscholtz, 1829

= Acmaeodera =

Genus of beetles

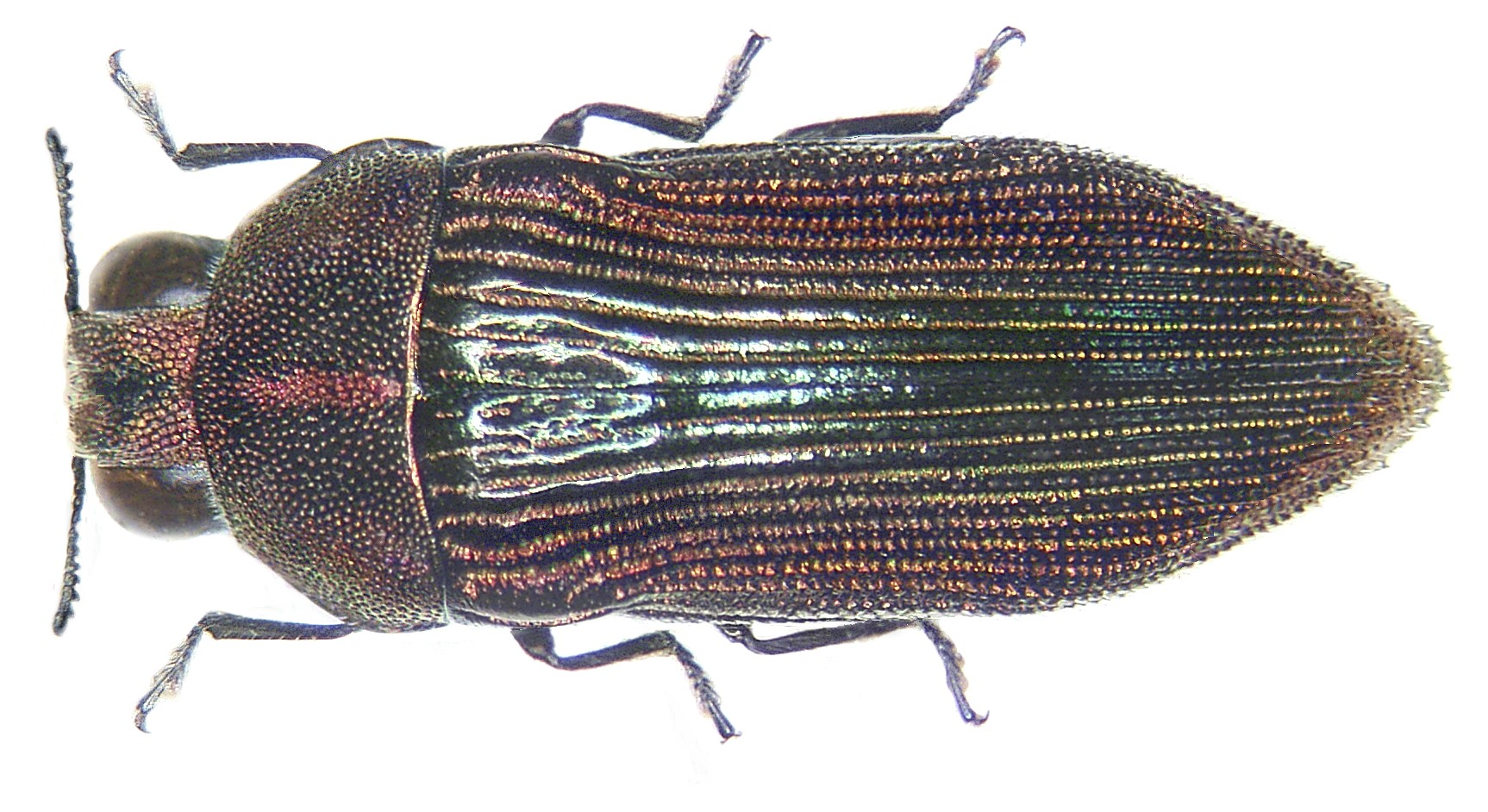
Acmaeodera brooksi

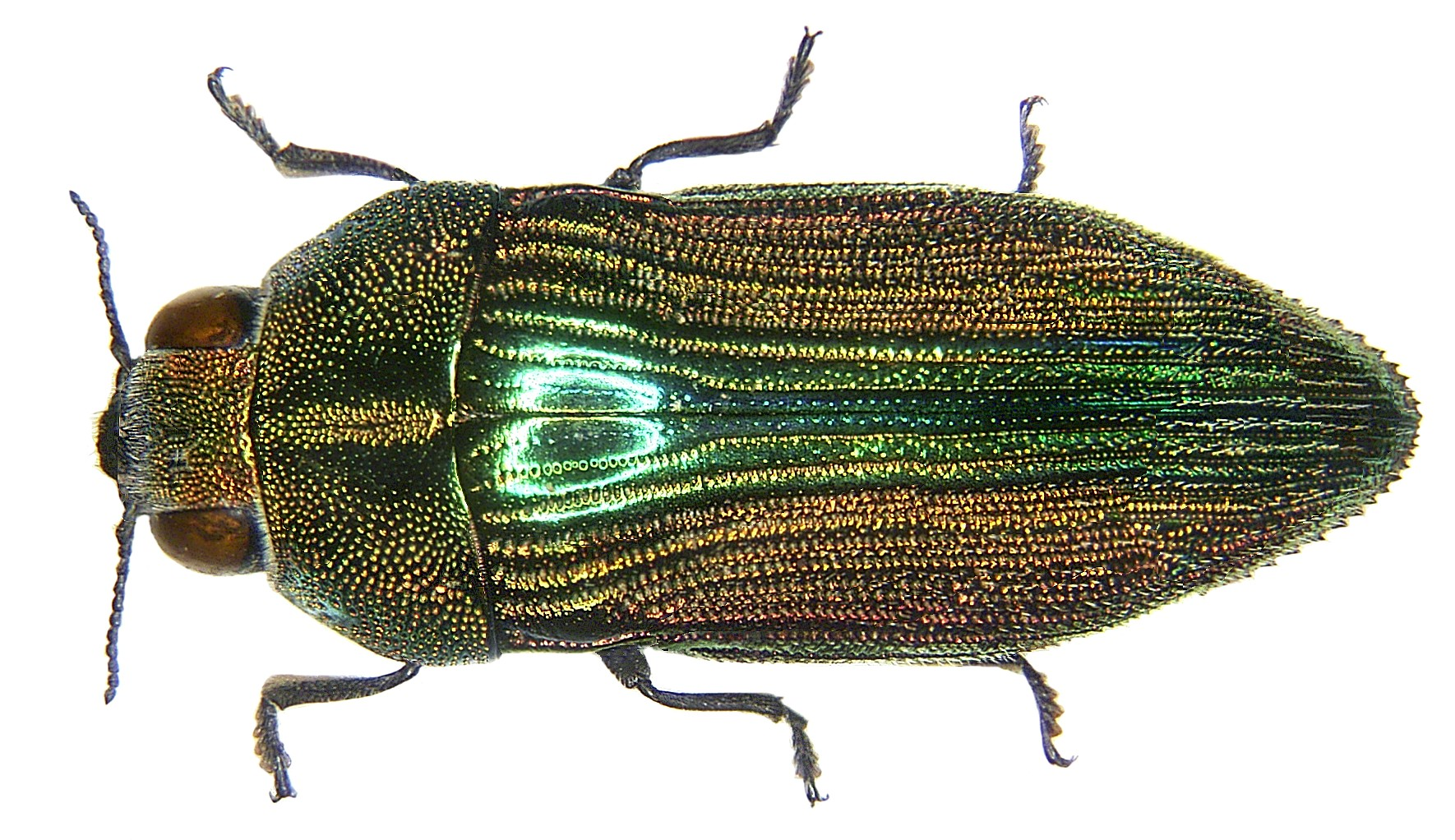
Acmaeodera excellens

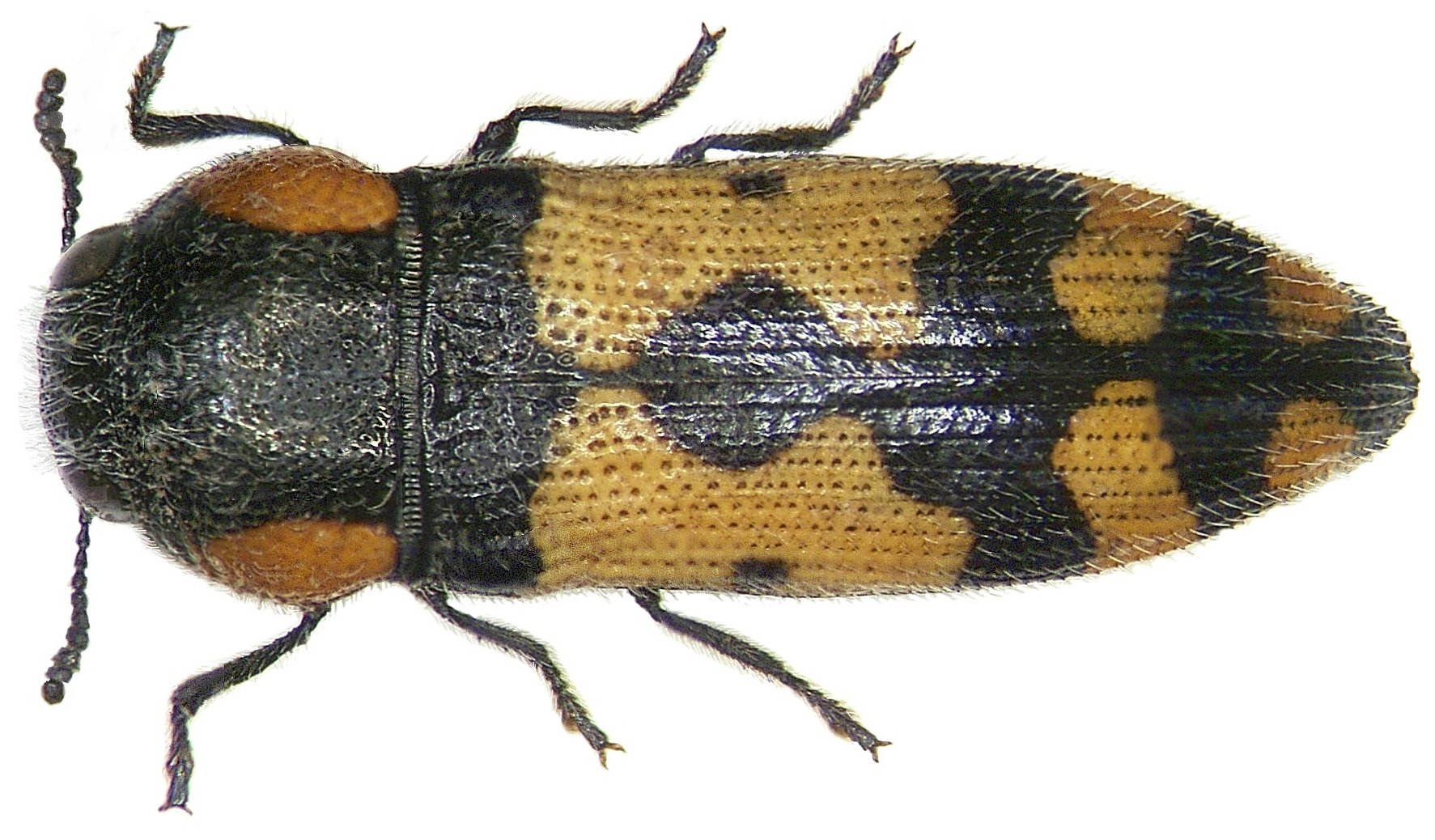
Acmaeodera louwi

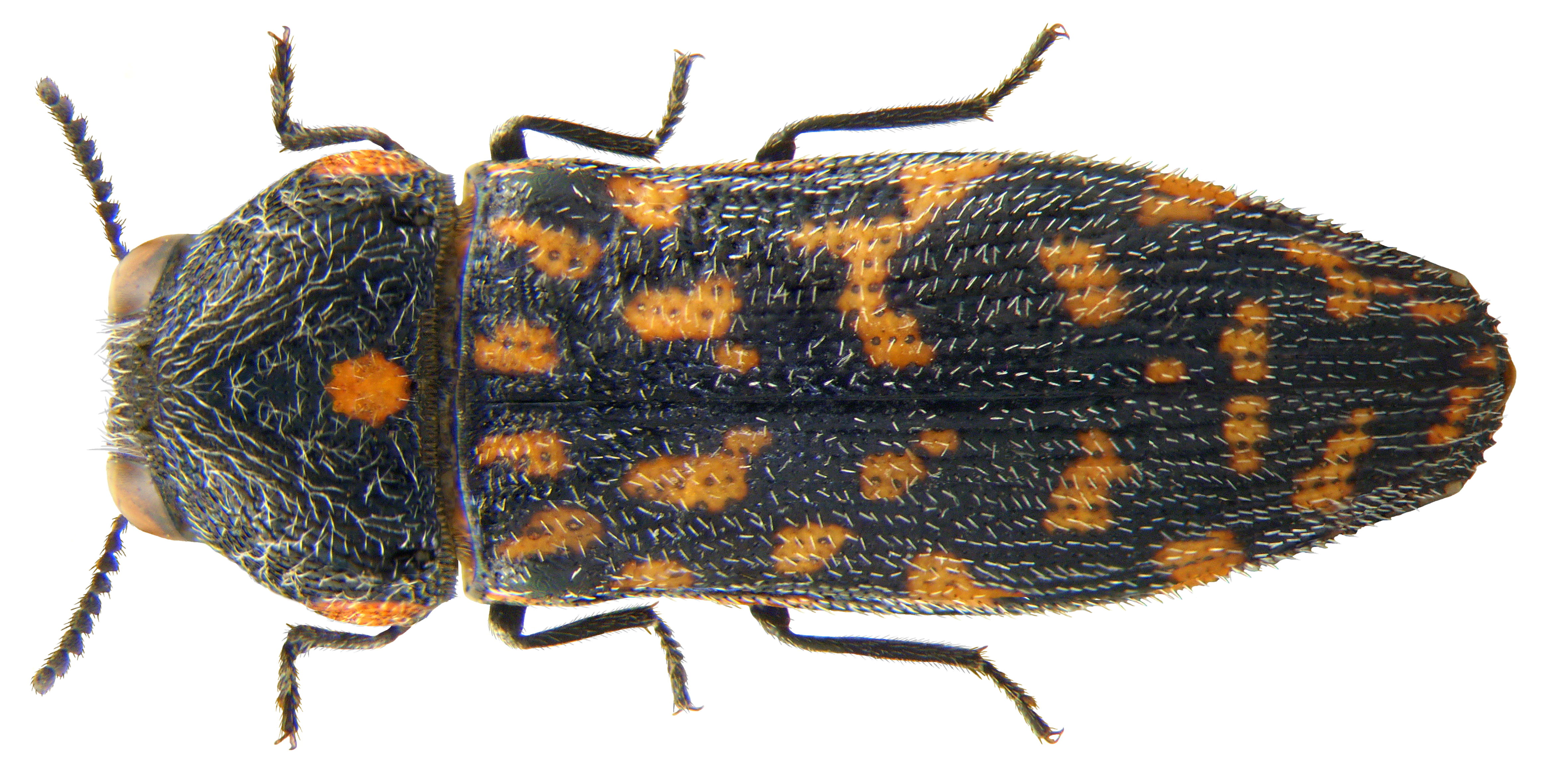
Acmaeodera signata gaerdesi

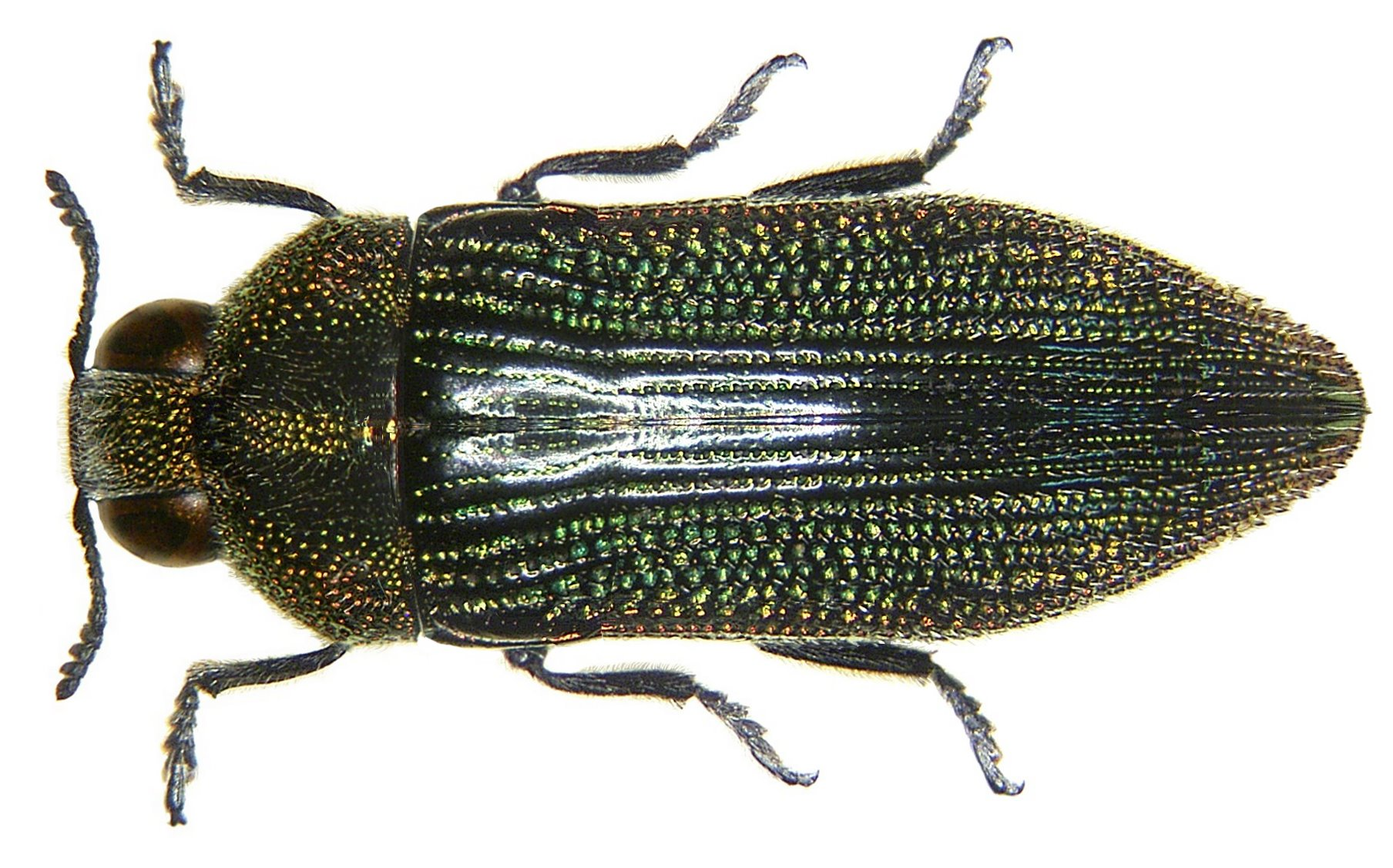
Acmaeodera viridaenea

Acmaeodera is a genus of beetles in the family Buprestidae, a group of metallic, wood-boring beetles favored by insect collectors. Whereas most beetles, including most buprestids, fly with their elytra held out and vibrating their hindwings to give lift and thrust, Acmaedodera species fly with their hind wings only — the elytra are fused down the center and form a shield over the insect's abdomen, even during flight. This fact, combined with the banding across the abdomen, which is common (though not universal) in this family, gives many of them a distinct, wasp-like appearance when in flight. Several are therefore considered hymenopteran mimics.

== Species ==
The genus contains these species:

- Acmaeodera abyssinica Kerremans, 1909
- Acmaeodera acaciae Mayet, 1887
- Acmaeodera acanthicola Barr, 1972
- Acmaeodera actites Westcott, 2002
- Acmaeodera acuminata Kerremans, 1900
- Acmaeodera acuta LeConte, 1860
- Acmaeodera adenostomae Cazier, 1938
- Acmaeodera adenostomensis Knull, 1941
- Acmaeodera adusta Barr, 1972
- Acmaeodera aenea Kerremans, 1899
- Acmaeodera aeneoflava Westcott, 1998
- Acmaeodera aequalis Obst, 1903
- Acmaeodera aethiopica Obenberger, 1941
- Acmaeodera affabilis Kerremans, 1909
- Acmaeodera affinis Lucas, 1846
- Acmaeodera aguanyoro Manley, 1987
- Acmaeodera alacris Horn, 1878
- Acmaeodera albovillosa Fåhraeus in Boheman, 1851
- Acmaeodera alcmeone Thomson, 1878
- Acmaeodera algirica Kerremans, 1907
- Acmaeodera alicia Fall, 1899
- Acmaeodera alluaudi Kerremans, 1914
- Acmaeodera alpina Barr, 1972
- Acmaeodera altae Holm in Holm & Schoeman, 1999
- Acmaeodera amabilis Horn, 1878
- Acmaeodera amoenula Fåhraeus in Boheman, 1851
- Acmaeodera amplicollis LeConte, 1866
- Acmaeodera anatolica Volkovitsh & Bílý, 1979
- Acmaeodera angelica Fall, 1899
- Acmaeodera antholita Heer, 1862
- Acmaeodera apiata Nelson, 1994
- Acmaeodera apicalis Fairmaire, 1902
- Acmaeodera aquila Nelson, 1994
- Acmaeodera arabica Gory, 1840
- Acmaeodera argodi (Kerremans, 1907)
- Acmaeodera atactospilota Westcott, 1971
- Acmaeodera atomosparsa Fairmaire, 1897
- Acmaeodera audreyae Westcott & Barr, 2007
- Acmaeodera aurantiofasciata Westcott & Noguera, 1995
- Acmaeodera aurantiomarginata Westcott, 1997
- Acmaeodera aurifera Laporte & Gory, 1835
- Acmaeodera auriferoides Holm, 1978
- Acmaeodera auritincta Fall, 1922
- Acmaeodera aurolimbata Fåhraeus in Boheman, 1851
- Acmaeodera aurora Fall, 1922
- Acmaeodera babatauensis Obenberger, 1935
- Acmaeodera bacchariphaga Westcott & Verity, 1977
- Acmaeodera balthasari Obenberger, 1928
- Acmaeodera barri Cazier, 1940
- Acmaeodera bartoni Obenberger, 940a
- Acmaeodera basilewskyi Holm, 1978
- Acmaeodera beesoni Obenberger, 1928
- Acmaeodera beharensis Obenberger, 1924
- Acmaeodera bellamyi Westcott in Holm & Schoeman, 1999
- Acmaeodera bequaerti Kerremans, 1912
- Acmaeodera bernardi Descarpentries, 1949
- Acmaeodera bertrami Levey, 2009
- Acmaeodera bertyorum Holynski, 1997
- Acmaeodera bifasciata (Thunberg, 1787)
- Acmaeodera bilyi Volkovitsh, 1988
- Acmaeodera bipunctata (Olivier, 1790)
- Acmaeodera biseriata Reitter, 1890
- Acmaeodera bishopiana Fall, 1907
- Acmaeodera bistriguttata Gory, 1840
- Acmaeodera bivulnera Horn, 1894
- Acmaeodera bjornstadi Levey & Volkovitsh, 1996
- Acmaeodera bodoani Kerremans, 1911
- Acmaeodera boreoafricana Bellamy, 1998
- Acmaeodera bowditchi Fall, 1901
- Acmaeodera brevicollis Heer, 1862
- Acmaeodera brevipes Kiesenwetter, 1858
- Acmaeodera brooksi Waterhouse, 1904
- Acmaeodera bruchi Obenberger, 1924
- Acmaeodera brunneipennis Kerremans, 1906
- Acmaeodera bryanti Van Dyke, 1953
- Acmaeodera bucki Cobos, 1958
- Acmaeodera burmanica Volkovitsh, 2006
- Acmaeodera bushirensis Obenberger, 1940
- Acmaeodera butensis Théry, 1932
- Acmaeodera cactophila Westcott & Noguera, 1995
- Acmaeodera capicola Thomson, 1878
- Acmaeodera carlota Fall, 1931
- Acmaeodera cazieri Knull, 1960
- Acmaeodera ceanothae Nelson, 1967
- Acmaeodera cecropia Kiesenwetter, 1858
- Acmaeodera cerasina Marseul, 1866
- Acmaeodera chaetosoma Obenberger, 1928
- Acmaeodera chalcithorax Obenberger, 1935
- Acmaeodera chamelensis Westcott, 2005
- Acmaeodera chemsaki Barr, 1992
- Acmaeodera chevrolatii Spinola, 1838
- Acmaeodera childreni Laporte & Gory, 1835
- Acmaeodera chiricahuae Barr, 1972
- Acmaeodera chotanica Semenov, 1891
- Acmaeodera cincticollis Kerremans, 1893
- Acmaeodera cisti Wollaston, 1862
- Acmaeodera clausa Horn, 1894
- Acmaeodera clypeata Barr, 1972
- Acmaeodera cobosi Holm, 1978
- Acmaeodera coeruleonigra Obenberger, 1928
- Acmaeodera coluber Abeille de Perrin, 1904
- Acmaeodera comata LeConte, 1858
- Acmaeodera combretumi Théry, 1938
- Acmaeodera condita Barr, 1972
- Acmaeodera congener Spinola, 1838
- Acmaeodera connexa LeConte, 1859
- Acmaeodera conoidea Fall, 1899
- Acmaeodera consors Horn, 1878
- Acmaeodera conspersa (Thunberg, 1827)
- Acmaeodera constricticollis Knull, 1937
- Acmaeodera constrictinotum Westcott & Nelson, 2000
- Acmaeodera convicta Fall, 1899
- Acmaeodera coquilletti Fall, 1899
- Acmaeodera cordatistigma Westcott, 1998
- Acmaeodera corrosa Thomson, 1878
- Acmaeodera cribricollis Horn, 1894
- Acmaeodera crinita Gory, 1840
- Acmaeodera croceonotata Gory, 1840
- Acmaeodera crossi Barr, 1992
- Acmaeodera crotonae Westcott & Noguera, 1995
- Acmaeodera cruenta (Olivier, 1790)
- Acmaeodera cubaecola Jacqueline du Val, 1857
- Acmaeodera culucoensis Manley, 1987
- Acmaeodera cuneata Fall, 1899
- Acmaeodera cupreosuturata Obst, 1903
- Acmaeodera cuprina Spinola, 1838
- Acmaeodera curlettii Holm in Holm & Schoeman, 1999
- Acmaeodera curtilata Knull, 1941
- Acmaeodera cylindrica (Fabricius, 1775)
- Acmaeodera damasensis Pic, 1936
- Acmaeodera danforthi Fisher, 1949
- Acmaeodera davidsoni Barr, 1972
- Acmaeodera decellei Holm, 1985
- Acmaeodera decemguttata (Thunberg, 1787)
- Acmaeodera decipiens LeConte, 1866
- Acmaeodera degener (Scopoli, 1763)
- Acmaeodera delectabilis Waterhouse, 1889
- Acmaeodera delumbis Horn, 1894
- Acmaeodera deplanata Théry, 1926
- Acmaeodera depressa Barr, 1972
- Acmaeodera deviata Barr, 1972
- Acmaeodera diffusa Barr, 1969
- Acmaeodera digna Barr, 1992
- Acmaeodera discalis Cazier, 1940
- Acmaeodera discolor Barr, 1992
- Acmaeodera disjuncta Fall, 1899
- Acmaeodera distigma Volkovitsh, 1983
- Acmaeodera divina Théry, 1926
- Acmaeodera dolorosa Fall, 1899
- Acmaeodera dozieri Barr, 1992
- Acmaeodera dumbrodyensis Holm, 1978
- Acmaeodera eckweileri Volkovitsh, 1983
- Acmaeodera edmundi Obenberger, 1935
- Acmaeodera elbiae Holm, 1986
- Acmaeodera elevata (Klug, 1829)
- Acmaeodera ellyae Holm, 1978
- Acmaeodera ephedrae Barr, 1943
- Acmaeodera errans Barr, 1972
- Acmaeodera erytrensis Holm, 1978
- Acmaeodera exasperans Kerremans, 1907
- Acmaeodera excellens (Klug, 1855)
- Acmaeodera exilis Waterhouse, 1882
- Acmaeodera externa Fairmaire, 1899
- Acmaeodera fabriciana Volkovitsh, 1983
- Acmaeodera fairmairei Théry, 1905
- Acmaeodera fascigera Harold, 1869
- Acmaeodera fattigi Knull, 1953
- Acmaeodera fenyesi Fall, 1899
- Acmaeodera ferrandii Obenberger, 1924
- Acmaeodera flavolineata Laporte & Gory, 1835
- Acmaeodera flavomarginata (Gray, 1832)
- Acmaeodera flavonotata Lucas, 1846
- Acmaeodera flavopicta Waterhouse, 1889
- Acmaeodera flavosparsa Waterhouse, 1882
- Acmaeodera flavosticta Horn, 1878
- Acmaeodera fontainieri Kerremans, 1906
- Acmaeodera fossiceps Quedenfeldt, 1886
- Acmaeodera foudrasii Solier, 1833
- Acmaeodera franchettii (Théry, 1931)
- Acmaeodera gardneri Obenberger, 1928
- Acmaeodera gentilis Péringuey, 1888
- Acmaeodera ghilarovi Volkovitsh, 1988
- Acmaeodera gibbula LeConte, 1858
- Acmaeodera gibbuloides Westcott, 1998
- Acmaeodera gillespiensis Knull, 1941
- Acmaeodera glabella Obenberger, 1924
- Acmaeodera glabra Obenberger, 1924
- Acmaeodera glebi Volkovitsh, 2009
- Acmaeodera gosseti Kerremans, 1906
- Acmaeodera gracilis (Wiedemann, 1821)
- Acmaeodera grandicollis Abeille de Perrin, 1900
- Acmaeodera grandis Guérin-Méneville, 1850
- Acmaeodera grata Fåhraeus in Boheman, 1851
- Acmaeodera gratiosa Théry, 1926
- Acmaeodera griffithi Fall, 1899
- Acmaeodera griswoldi Westcott, 2002
- Acmaeodera guayarmina Volkovitsh & Liberto, 2002
- Acmaeodera guichardi Levey & Volkovitsh, 1996
- Acmaeodera gundlachi Fisher, 1925
- Acmaeodera haemorrhoa LeConte, 1858
- Acmaeodera haubaas Holm in Holm & Schoeman, 1999
- Acmaeodera hedwigae Obenberger, 1942
- Acmaeodera hepburnii LeConte, 1860
- Acmaeodera hessei Holm, 1978
- Acmaeodera hieroglyphica Fåhraeus in Boheman, 1851
- Acmaeodera hoberlandti Bílý, 1983
- Acmaeodera holiki Obenberger, 1924
- Acmaeodera holmi Levey & Volkovitsh, 1996
- Acmaeodera holsteni White, 1939
- Acmaeodera holzschuhi Volkovitsh & Bílý, 1979
- Acmaeodera hondurensis Manley, 1987
- Acmaeodera horni Fall, 1899
- Acmaeodera hovorei Westcott, 2007
- Acmaeodera howa Obenberger, 1924
- Acmaeodera ichikoae Ohmomo, 2004
- Acmaeodera idahoensis Barr, 1969
- Acmaeodera ikuthensis Holm, 1978
- Acmaeodera illustris Théry, 1926
- Acmaeodera immaculata Horn, 1878
- Acmaeodera impluviata Mannerheim, 1837
- Acmaeodera impressicollis Kerremans, 1911
- Acmaeodera indica Kerremans, 1914
- Acmaeodera inopinata Barr, 1972
- Acmaeodera inquirenda Volkovitsh, 1977
- Acmaeodera inscripta Fåhraeus in Boheman, 1851
- Acmaeodera instabilis Cobos, 1966
- Acmaeodera interrupta Kerremans, 1892
- Acmaeodera inyoensis Cazier, 1940
- Acmaeodera irrorella Laporte & Gory, 1835
- Acmaeodera jakobsoni Obenberger, 1928
- Acmaeodera jamaicensis Fisher, 1925
- Acmaeodera jeanae Davidson, 2003
- Acmaeodera jeanneli Kerremans, 1914
- Acmaeodera jocosa Fall, 1899
- Acmaeodera jubata Barr, 1992
- Acmaeodera kabakovi Volkovitsh in Alexeev, et al., 1990
- Acmaeodera kachetica Semenov, 1895
- Acmaeodera karooana Holm, 1978
- Acmaeodera kathyae Westcott, 1996
- Acmaeodera kaupii Thomson, 1878
- Acmaeodera kerremansi Stebbing, 1914
- Acmaeodera kerzhneri Volkovitsh, 2008
- Acmaeodera knabi Fisher, 1949
- Acmaeodera knobeli Holm, 1978
- Acmaeodera knowltoni Barr, 1969
- Acmaeodera knullorum Barr, 1972
- Acmaeodera kochi Holm, 1978
- Acmaeodera kolbei Kerremans, 1907
- Acmaeodera kosterae Holm, 1978
- Acmaeodera krugeri Holm, 1978
- Acmaeodera kunzeni Holm, 1978
- Acmaeodera labyrinthica Fall, 1899
- Acmaeodera lacustris Thomson, 1878
- Acmaeodera lagunae Van Dyke, 1945
- Acmaeodera lata Heyden, 1885
- Acmaeodera lateralis Chevrolat, 1834
- Acmaeodera laticollis Kerremans, 1902
- Acmaeodera latiflava Fall, 1907
- Acmaeodera lauta Barr, 1972
- Acmaeodera lemoinei Thomson, 1878
- Acmaeodera leonhardi Obenberger, 1914
- Acmaeodera leprieurii (Klug, 1835)
- Acmaeodera lesnei Kerremans, 1906
- Acmaeodera liessnerae Holm, 1986
- Acmaeodera ligulata Cazier, 1940
- Acmaeodera linsleyi Van Dyke, 1943
- Acmaeodera loei Manley, 1987
- Acmaeodera longa Holm, 1978
- Acmaeodera longicrinis Obenberger, 1924
- Acmaeodera longipennis Waterhouse, 1882
- Acmaeodera lopatini Volkovitsh, 2005
- Acmaeodera louwi Holm, 1985
- Acmaeodera lucana Van Dyke, 1942
- Acmaeodera lucida Volkovitsh, 1983
- Acmaeodera luculenta Boheman, 1860
- Acmaeodera lugubrina Boheman, 1860
- Acmaeodera lupinae Nelson, 1996
- Acmaeodera luteonigra Obenberger, 1928
- Acmaeodera luteopicta Fåhraeus in Boheman, 1851
- Acmaeodera luzonica Nonfried, 1895
- Acmaeodera lysilomae Nelson, 1994
- Acmaeodera macchabaea Abeille de Perrin, 1891
- Acmaeodera macra Horn, 1878
- Acmaeodera maculifera Horn, 1894
- Acmaeodera madegassa Kerremans, 1907
- Acmaeodera maghrebica Volkovitsh, 2006
- Acmaeodera malvina Gistel, 1857
- Acmaeodera maraisi Holm in Holm & Schoeman, 1999
- Acmaeodera marginarcuata Westcott, 1998
- Acmaeodera marginenotata Chevrolat, 1867
- Acmaeodera mariposa Horn, 1878
- Acmaeodera marki Holm in Holm & Schoeman, 1999
- Acmaeodera maroccana Obenberger, 1916
- Acmaeodera medvedevi Volkovitsh, 1976
- Acmaeodera meridionalis Kerremans, 1897
- Acmaeodera miliaris Horn, 1878
- Acmaeodera mima Gory, 1840
- Acmaeodera mimicata Knull, 1938
- Acmaeodera mimicomixteca Westcott, 1998
- Acmaeodera miniatospilota Kerremans, 1907
- Acmaeodera mirabilis Volkovitsh in Alexeev, et al., 1990
- Acmaeodera mirei Descarpentries & Mateu, 1965
- Acmaeodera mixta LeConte, 1860
- Acmaeodera mixteca Westcott, 1998
- Acmaeodera moesta Dugès, 1891
- Acmaeodera mojavei Westcott, 1971
- Acmaeodera mombassica Nonfried, 1895
- Acmaeodera monticola Fisher, 1949
- Acmaeodera moralesi Español & Mateu, 1947
- Acmaeodera morbosa Fall, 1899
- Acmaeodera morio Gory, 1840
- Acmaeodera mudgei Westcott, 2002
- Acmaeodera mwengwensis Holm, 1986
- Acmaeodera namaquensis Holm in Holm & Schoeman, 1999
- Acmaeodera navajo Nelson & Westcott, 1995
- Acmaeodera neglecta Fall, 1899
- Acmaeodera nelsoni Barr, 1972
- Acmaeodera neoneglecta Fisher, 1949
- Acmaeodera nevadica Barr, 1972
- Acmaeodera nexa Fall, 1922
- Acmaeodera ngamensis Obenberger, 1928
- Acmaeodera nickerli Obenberger, 1924
- Acmaeodera nigellata Abeille de Perrin, 1904
- Acmaeodera nigrohirta Théry, 1926
- Acmaeodera nigrovittata Van Dyke, 1934
- Acmaeodera nocturna Holm, 1978
- Acmaeodera nodieri Holm, 1978
- Acmaeodera noguerai Westcott in Westcott, et al., 2008
- Acmaeodera obrienorum Bellamy, 2006
- Acmaeodera obscurata Ancey, 1882
- Acmaeodera obsti Kerremans, 1907
- Acmaeodera obtusa Horn, 1878
- Acmaeodera ocellata Abeille de Perrin, 1891
- Acmaeodera opacula LeConte, 1858
- Acmaeodera opinabilis Fall, 1899
- Acmaeodera opuntiae Knull, 1966
- Acmaeodera ornata (Fabricius, 1775)
- Acmaeodera ornatoides Barr, 1972
- Acmaeodera ottomana (Frivaldszky, 1837)
- Acmaeodera pallidepicta Reitter, 1895
- Acmaeodera panamintensis Westcott, 1971
- Acmaeodera paradisjuncta Knull, 1940
- Acmaeodera parkeri Cazier, 1940
- Acmaeodera patricki Brechtel, 1998
- Acmaeodera paulsenii (Fairmaire & Germain, 1860)
- Acmaeodera pavliceki (Bílý, 1973)
- Acmaeodera penrithae Holm, 1985
- Acmaeodera perforata Cazier, 1940
- Acmaeodera perlanosa Timberlake, 1939
- Acmaeodera philippii Reed, 1873
- Acmaeodera philippinensis Obenberger, 1924
- Acmaeodera pici Obenberger, 1924
- Acmaeodera picta Waterhouse, 1882
- Acmaeodera pilosellae (Bonelli, 1812)
- Acmaeodera pinalorum Knull, 1930
- Acmaeodera pinguicula Obenberger, 1924
- Acmaeodera plagiaticauda Horn, 1878
- Acmaeodera planidorsis Semenov, 1895
- Acmaeodera planiuscula Laporte & Gory, 1835
- Acmaeodera pletura Barr, 1972
- Acmaeodera polita (Klug, 1829)
- Acmaeodera postfasciata Fairmaire, 1901
- Acmaeodera posticalis Laporte & Gory, 1835
- Acmaeodera princeps Kerremans, 1909
- Acmaeodera prorsa Fall, 1899
- Acmaeodera prorugosa Holm, 1978
- Acmaeodera pruinosa Fairmaire, 1899
- Acmaeodera pseudopolita Descarpentries & Mateu, 1965
- Acmaeodera puberula Solier, 1833
- Acmaeodera pubiventris Horn, 1878
- Acmaeodera pulchella (Herbst, 1801)
- Acmaeodera pulcherrima Jacquelin du Val, 1857
- Acmaeodera pulchra (Fabricius, 1793)
- Acmaeodera pullata Cazier, 1940
- Acmaeodera punctatissima Thomson, 1878
- Acmaeodera purpurescens Holm in Holm & Schoeman, 1999
- Acmaeodera purshiae Fisher, 1926
- Acmaeodera quadrifaria Baudi di Selve, 1870
- Acmaeodera quadrifasciata (Rossi, 1790)
- Acmaeodera quadriseriata Fall, 1899
- Acmaeodera quadrivittata Horn, 1870
- Acmaeodera quadrivittatoides Nelson & Westcott, 1995
- Acmaeodera quadrizonata Abeille de Perrin, 1891
- Acmaeodera raffrayi Gestro, 1881
- Acmaeodera reaumuri Obenberger, 1928
- Acmaeodera recticollis Fall, 1899
- Acmaeodera recticolloides Westcott, 1971
- Acmaeodera reflexa Barr, 1992
- Acmaeodera regularis Waterhouse, 1882
- Acmaeodera resplendens Van Dyke, 1937
- Acmaeodera retifera LeConte, 1859
- Acmaeodera revelieri Mulsant, 1859
- Acmaeodera riograndei Nelson, 1980
- Acmaeodera robigo Knull, 1954
- Acmaeodera robusta Horn, 1878
- Acmaeodera rodriguezae Westcott, 2005
- Acmaeodera rondoni Baudon, 1962
- Acmaeodera ruahaensis Levey & Volkovitsh, 1996
- Acmaeodera rubescens Schaeffer, 1904
- Acmaeodera rubidiplagis Obenberger, 1928
- Acmaeodera rubrocuprea Westcott & Nelson, 2000
- Acmaeodera rubroguttula Nelson, 1994
- Acmaeodera rubromaculata Lucas, 1844
- Acmaeodera rubronotata Laporte & Gory, 1835
- Acmaeodera rubrovittata Nelson, 1994
- Acmaeodera rubrozona Kerremans, 1914
- Acmaeodera ruficaudis (DeGeer, 1778)
- Acmaeodera rufocincta Baudi di Selve, 1870
- Acmaeodera rufoguttata Reitter, 1890
- Acmaeodera rufolateralis Westcott, 1998
- Acmaeodera ruricola Fisher, 1949
- Acmaeodera rustica Fisher, 1949
- Acmaeodera sabinae Knull, 1937
- Acmaeodera sahariensis Volkovitsh, 1987
- Acmaeodera sancta Théry, 1926
- Acmaeodera sanguineosignata Laporte & Gory, 1835
- Acmaeodera santschii Théry, 1930
- Acmaeodera saxicola Spinola, 1838
- Acmaeodera scalaris Mannerheim, 1837
- Acmaeodera scapularis Horn, 1894
- Acmaeodera schoutedeni Obenberger, 1928
- Acmaeodera sedecimmactata Abeille de Perrin, 1891
- Acmaeodera semenovi Obenberger, 935j
- Acmaeodera serena Fall, 1899
- Acmaeodera setosa Waterhouse, 1882
- Acmaeodera seyrigi Théry, 1937
- Acmaeodera signata Laporte & Gory, 1835
- Acmaeodera signifera Fåhraeus in Boheman, 1851
- Acmaeodera simulans Abeille de Perrin, 1891
- Acmaeodera simulata Van Dyke, 1937
- Acmaeodera sinaloensis Dugès, 1891
- Acmaeodera singularis Barr, 1992
- Acmaeodera sinuata Van Dyke, 1919
- Acmaeodera sinuosa Kerremans, 1906
- Acmaeodera smaragdina Kerremans, 1892
- Acmaeodera solitaria Kerremans, 1897
- Acmaeodera sommailae Baudon, 1963
- Acmaeodera sparsuta Fairmaire, 1898
- Acmaeodera sphaeralceae Barr, 1972
- Acmaeodera starrae Knull, 1966
- Acmaeodera stellaris Chevrolat, 1835
- Acmaeodera stellata Marseul, 1867
- Acmaeodera stictipennis Laporte & Gory, 1835
- Acmaeodera stictithorax Obenberger, 1928
- Acmaeodera stigmata Horn, 1884
- Acmaeodera striata Fisher, 1949
- Acmaeodera strictella Obenberger, 1942
- Acmaeodera subbalteata LeConte, 1863
- Acmaeodera subcylindrica Fisher, 1925
- Acmaeodera subprasina Marseul, 1867
- Acmaeodera sudanica Levey & Volkovitsh, 1996
- Acmaeodera sulcicollis Kerremans, 1914
- Acmaeodera superba Waterhouse, 1882
- Acmaeodera swammerdami Obenberger, 1928
- Acmaeodera tagoror Arnáiz, García Becerra & Bercedo, 2009
- Acmaeodera tarahumara Westcott, 1998
- Acmaeodera tassii Schaefer, 1964
- Acmaeodera tenebricosa Fall, 1922
- Acmaeodera tenuidigna Nelson, 1994
- Acmaeodera tenuivittata Westcott in Westcott, et al., 2008
- Acmaeodera texana LeConte, 1860
- Acmaeodera thoracata Knull, 1974
- Acmaeodera tibetica Volkovitsh, 2006
- Acmaeodera tibiosa Obenberger, 1917
- Acmaeodera tildenorum Nelson & Westcott, 1995
- Acmaeodera tiquilia Westcott & Barr, 1998
- Acmaeodera transcaucasica Semenov, 1895
- Acmaeodera transversa Van Dyke, 1945
- Acmaeodera trifasciata (Thunberg, 1789)
- Acmaeodera trizonalis Kerremans, 1892
- Acmaeodera truquii Abeille de Perrin, 1891
- Acmaeodera tubulus (Fabricius, 1801)
- Acmaeodera tulearica Théry, 1926
- Acmaeodera turnbowi Westcott, 1996
- Acmaeodera tuta Horn, 1878
- Acmaeodera ugandica Obenberger, 1928
- Acmaeodera undulata Abeille de Perrin, 1891
- Acmaeodera unica Kerremans, 1897
- Acmaeodera unicolor Fisher, 1949
- Acmaeodera uvaldensis Knull, 1936
- Acmaeodera uvarovi Obenberger, 1928
- Acmaeodera vanduzeei Van Dyke, 1934
- Acmaeodera vandykei Fall, 1899
- Acmaeodera vanebaptista Obenberger, 1928
- Acmaeodera variegata LeConte, 1852
- Acmaeodera venezuelica Bellamy, 1998
- Acmaeodera venusta Waterhouse, 1882
- Acmaeodera verityi Westcott, 1971
- Acmaeodera vernalis Barr, 1972
- Acmaeodera vianai Obenberger, 1947
- Acmaeodera vicina Laporte & Gory, 1835
- Acmaeodera villiersi Descarpentries, 1981
- Acmaeodera vipera Kerremans, 1906
- Acmaeodera virgo Boheman, 1860
- Acmaeodera viridaenea (DeGeer, 1778)
- Acmaeodera viridissima Chevrolat, 1835
- Acmaeodera vogtorum Holm in Holm & Schoeman, 1999
- Acmaeodera vulnerata Laporte & Gory, 1835
- Acmaeodera vulturei Knull, 1938
- Acmaeodera waterbergensis Holm, 1978
- Acmaeodera weiseri Obenberger, 1928
- Acmaeodera wenzeli Van Dyke, 1919
- Acmaeodera wethloi Obenberger, 1940
- Acmaeodera wheeleri Van Dyke, 1919
- Acmaeodera wickenburgana Knull, 1939
- Acmaeodera wickhami Fisher, 1925
- Acmaeodera wittmeri Holm in Holm & Schoeman, 1999
- Acmaeodera xanthelytra Obenberger, 1940
- Acmaeodera xanthosticta Laporte & Gory, 1835
- Acmaeodera yerburyi Waterhouse, 1904
- Acmaeodera yuccavora Knull, 1962
- Acmaeodera yunnana Fairmaire, 1888
- Acmaeodera zacatecana Westcott, 2002
- Acmaeodera zambesica Obenberger, 1928
