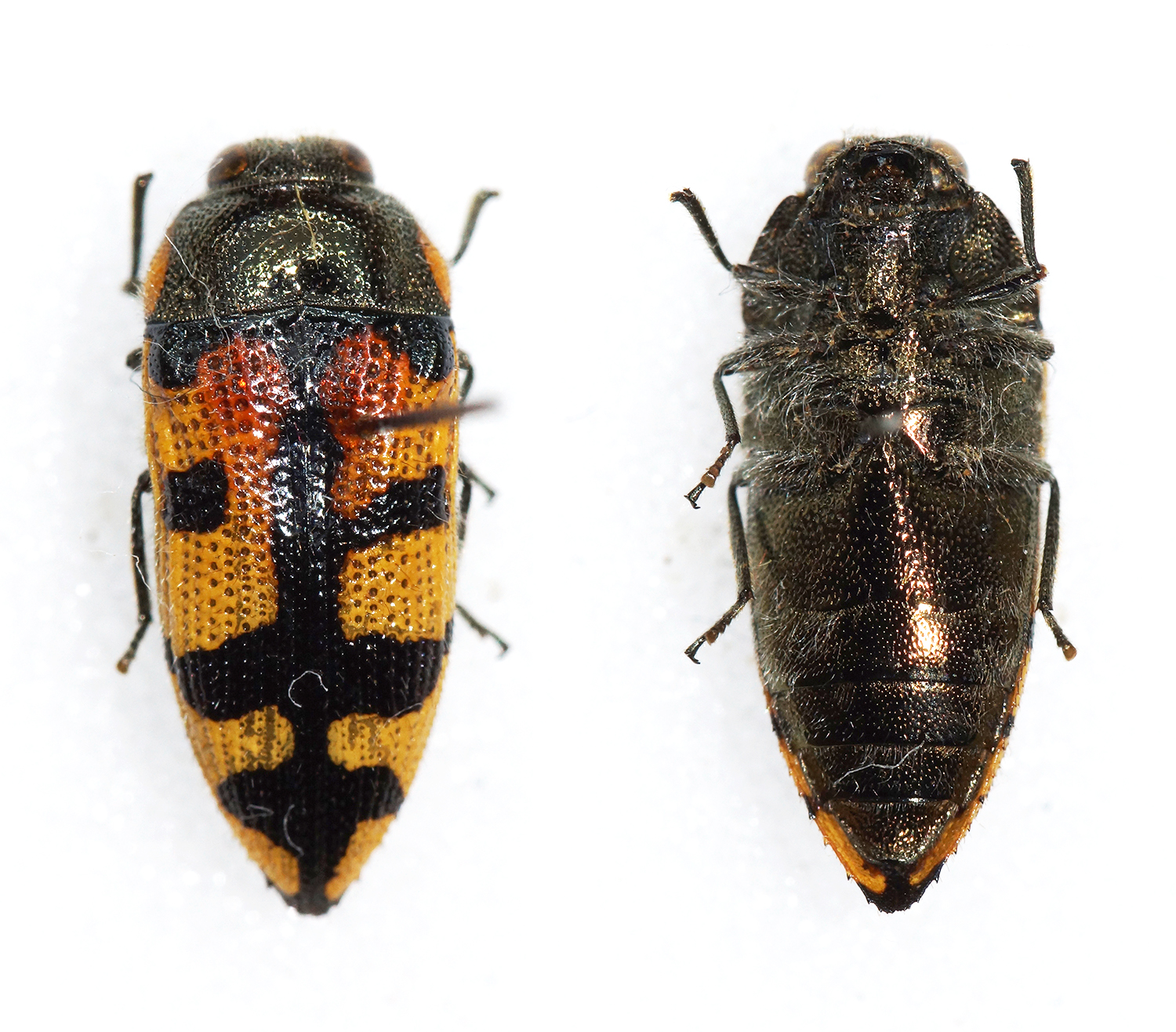

Scientific classification
- Domain: Eukaryota
- Kingdom: Animalia
- Phylum: Arthropoda
- Class: Insecta
- Order: Coleoptera
- Suborder: Polyphaga
- Infraorder: Elateriformia
- Family: Buprestidae
- Genus: Acmaeodera
- Species: A. tuta

Binomial name
- Acmaeodera tuta Horn, 1878

Synonyms
- Acmaeodera duboisi Cazier, 1938; Acmaeodera moronga Van Dyke, 1943; Acmaeodera rubrosuffusa Fall, 1907

= Acmaeodera tuta =

Species of beetle

Acmaeodera tuta is a species of metallic wood-boring beetle in the family Buprestidae. It is found in North America.
