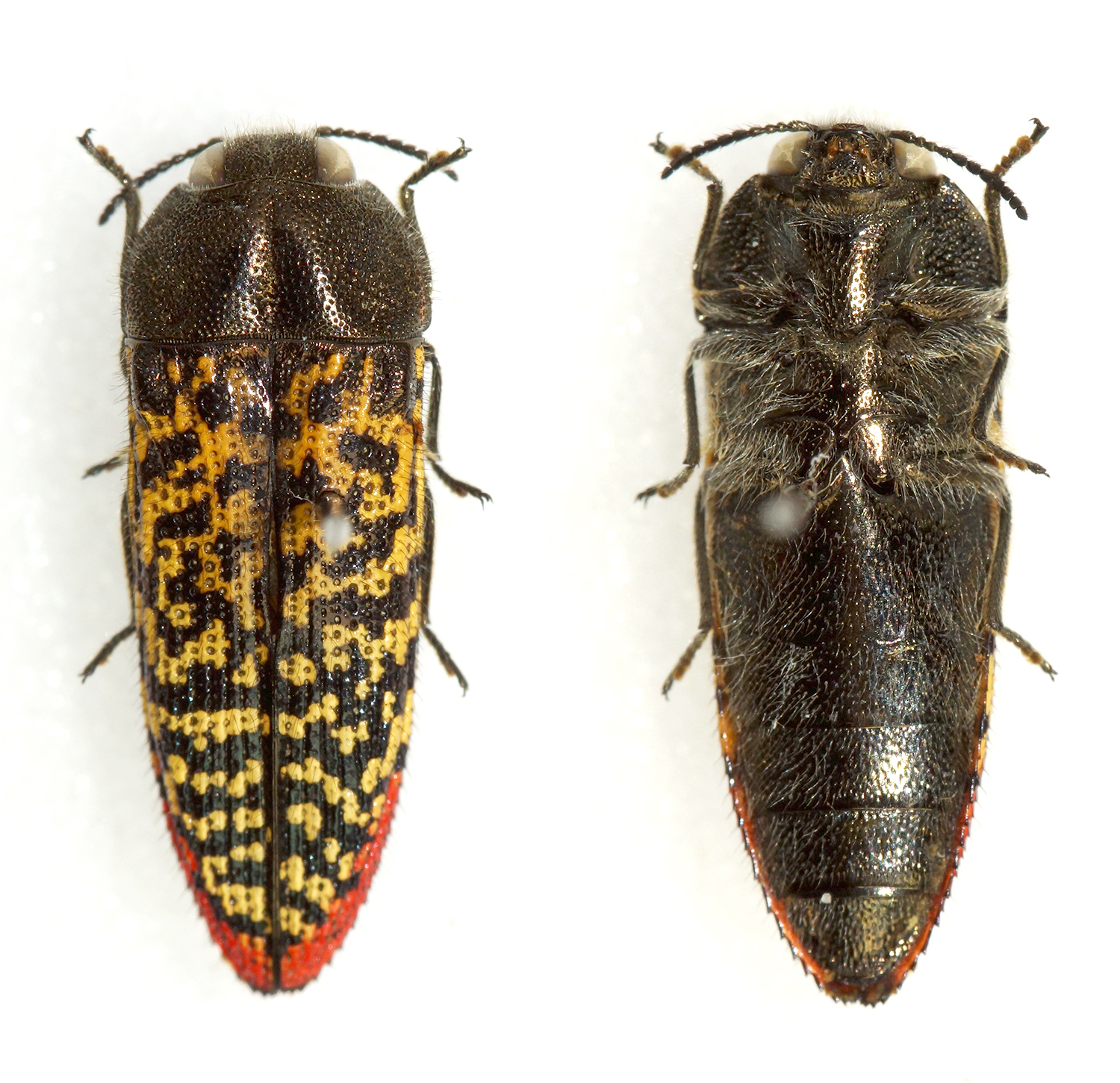

Scientific classification
- Kingdom: Animalia
- Phylum: Arthropoda
- Clade: Pancrustacea
- Class: Insecta
- Order: Coleoptera
- Suborder: Polyphaga
- Infraorder: Elateriformia
- Family: Buprestidae
- Genus: Acmaeodera
- Species: A. haemorrhoa

Binomial name
- Acmaeodera haemorrhoa LeConte, 1858

Synonyms
- Acmaeodera bouvieri Kerremans, 1906

= Acmaeodera haemorrhoa =

Species of beetle

Acmaeodera haemorrhoa is a species of metallic wood-boring beetle in the family Buprestidae. It is found in Central America and North America.
