= Acmaeodera dolorosa =

Scientific classification
- Domain: Eukaryota
- Kingdom: Animalia
- Phylum: Arthropoda
- Class: Insecta
- Order: Coleoptera
- Suborder: Polyphaga
- Infraorder: Elateriformia
- Family: Buprestidae
- Genus: Acmaeodera
- Species: A. dolorosa

Binomial name
- Acmaeodera dolorosa Fall, 1899

Species of beetle

Acmaeodera dolorosa is a species of metallic wood-boring beetle in the family Buprestidae. It is found in North America.

== Subspecies ==
- Acmaeodera dolorosa dolorosa Fall, 1899
- Acmaeodera dolorosa liberta Fall, 1922
