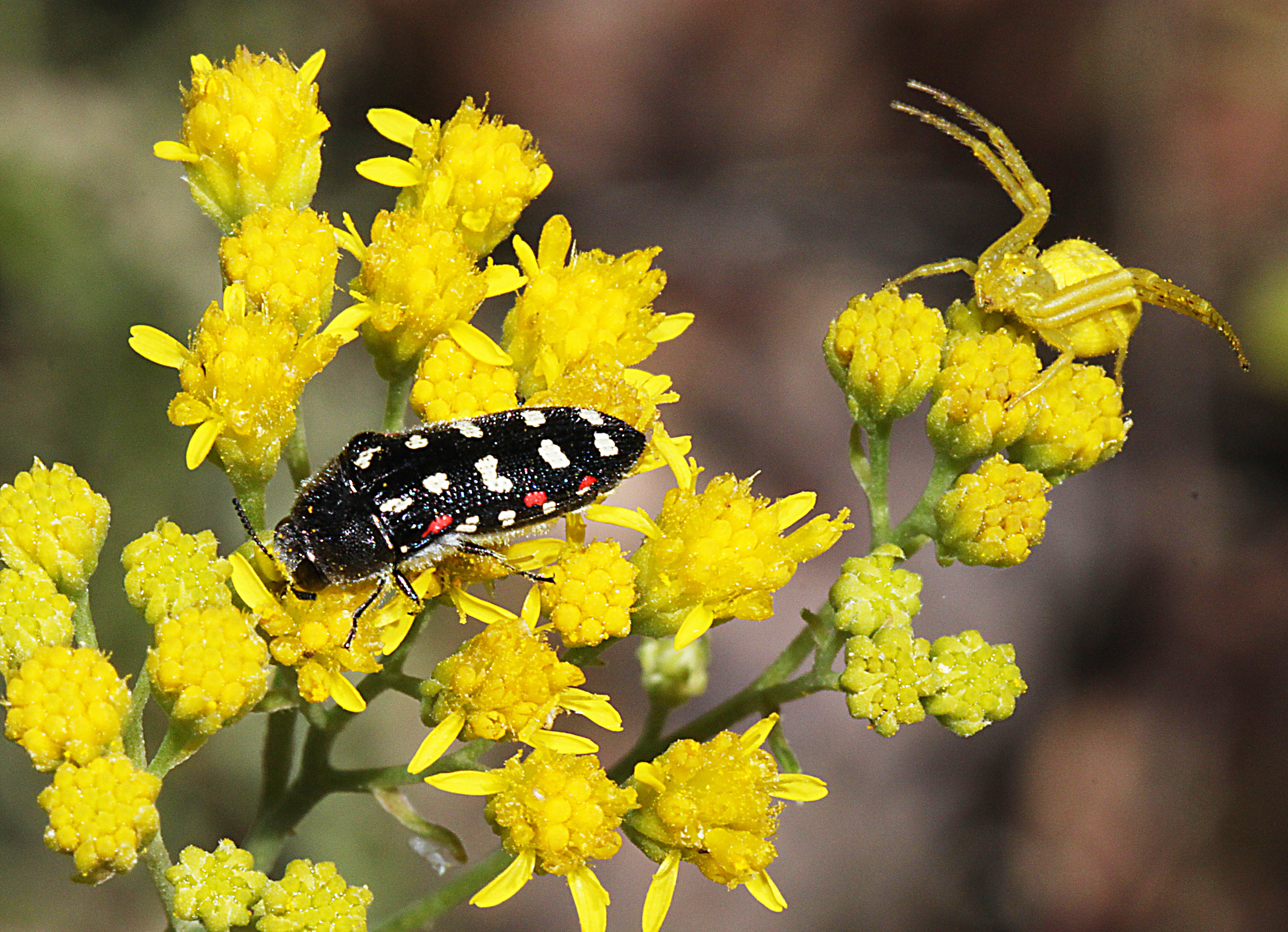

Scientific classification
- Domain: Eukaryota
- Kingdom: Animalia
- Phylum: Arthropoda
- Class: Insecta
- Order: Coleoptera
- Suborder: Polyphaga
- Infraorder: Elateriformia
- Family: Buprestidae
- Genus: Acmaeodera
- Species: A. gibbula

Binomial name
- Acmaeodera gibbula LeConte, 1858

Synonyms
- Acmaeodera gila Knull, 1930

= Acmaeodera gibbula =

Species of beetle

Acmaeodera gibbula is a species of metallic wood-boring beetle in the family Buprestidae. It is found in Central America and North America.
