= Acmaeodera atactospilota =

Scientific classification
- Domain: Eukaryota
- Kingdom: Animalia
- Phylum: Arthropoda
- Class: Insecta
- Order: Coleoptera
- Suborder: Polyphaga
- Infraorder: Elateriformia
- Family: Buprestidae
- Genus: Acmaeodera
- Species: A. atactospilota

Binomial name
- Acmaeodera atactospilota Westcott, 1971

Species of beetle

Acmaeodera atactospilota is a species of metallic wood-boring beetle in the family Buprestidae. It is found in North America.
