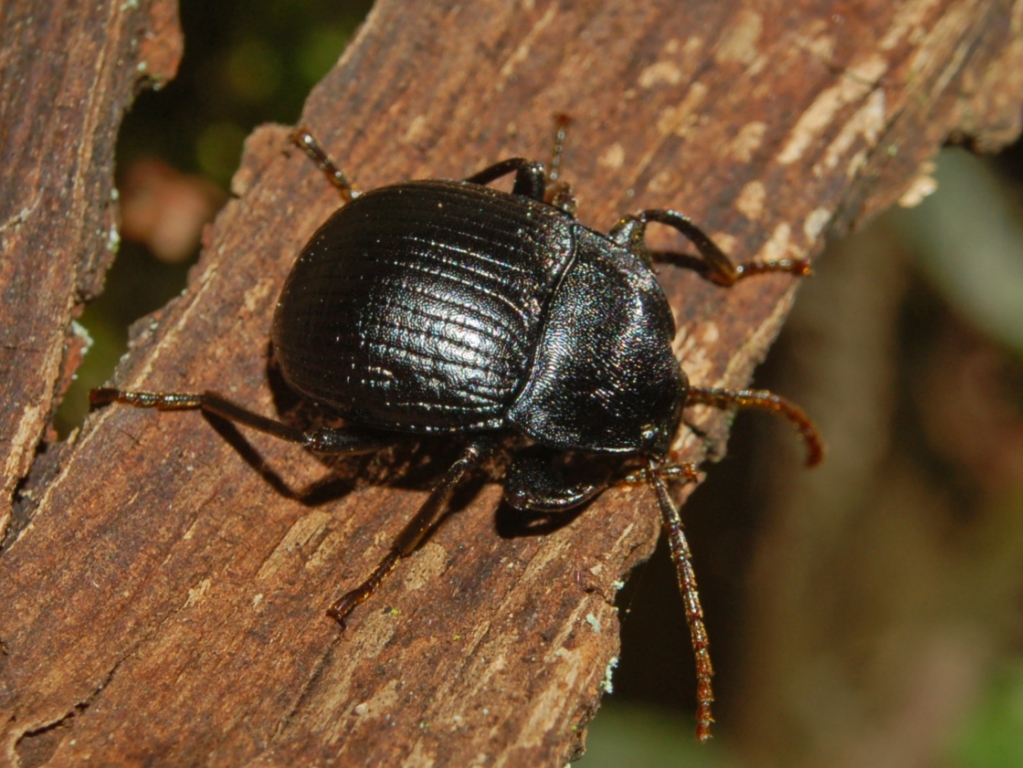
- A. velikensis – Dorsal view
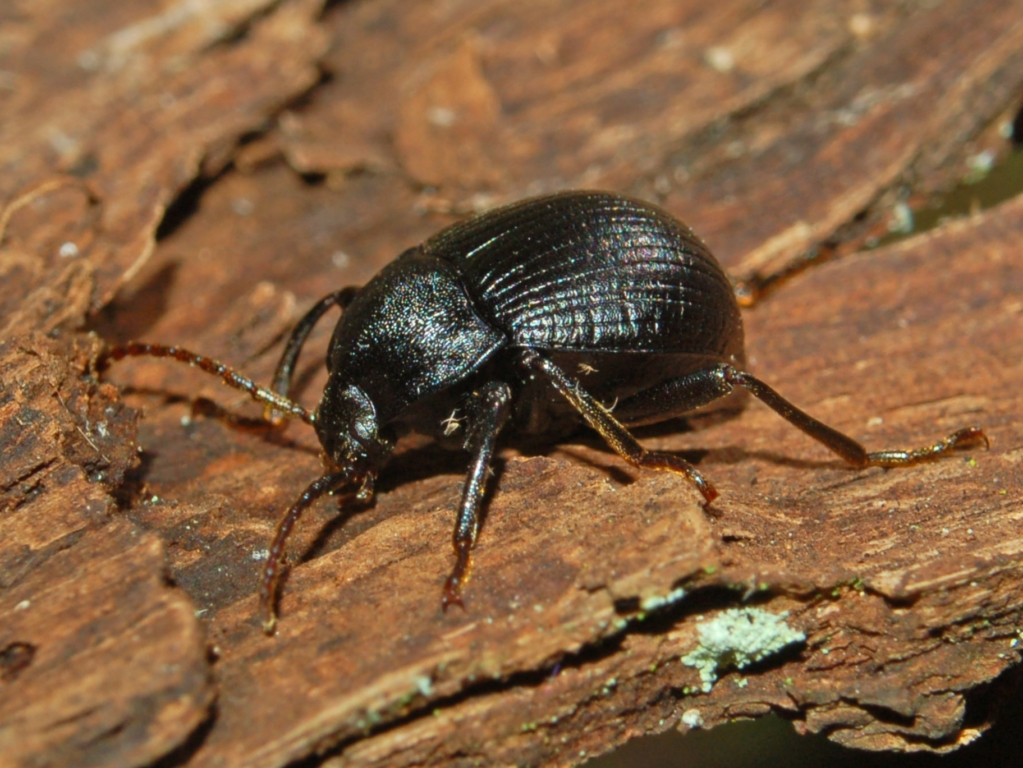
- A. velikensis – Lateral view

Scientific classification
- Domain: Eukaryota
- Kingdom: Animalia
- Phylum: Arthropoda
- Class: Insecta
- Order: Coleoptera
- Suborder: Polyphaga
- Infraorder: Cucujiformia
- Family: Tenebrionidae
- Genus: Accanthopus
- Species: A. velikensis

Binomial name
- Accanthopus velikensis (Piller & Mitterpacher, 1783)

= Accanthopus velikensis =

Species of beetle

Accanthopus velikensis is a species of darkling beetle belonging to the family Tenebrionidae subfamily Tenebrioninae.

== Synonyms ==
- Dendarus latissimus Stierlin, 1902
- Enoplopus dentipes (Rossi) Porta, 1934
- Enoplopus velikensis (Piller & Mitterpacher) Solier, 1848
- Helops dentipes Rossi, 1790
- Tenebrio caraboides Petagna, 1786 nec Linnaeus, 1758

== Description ==
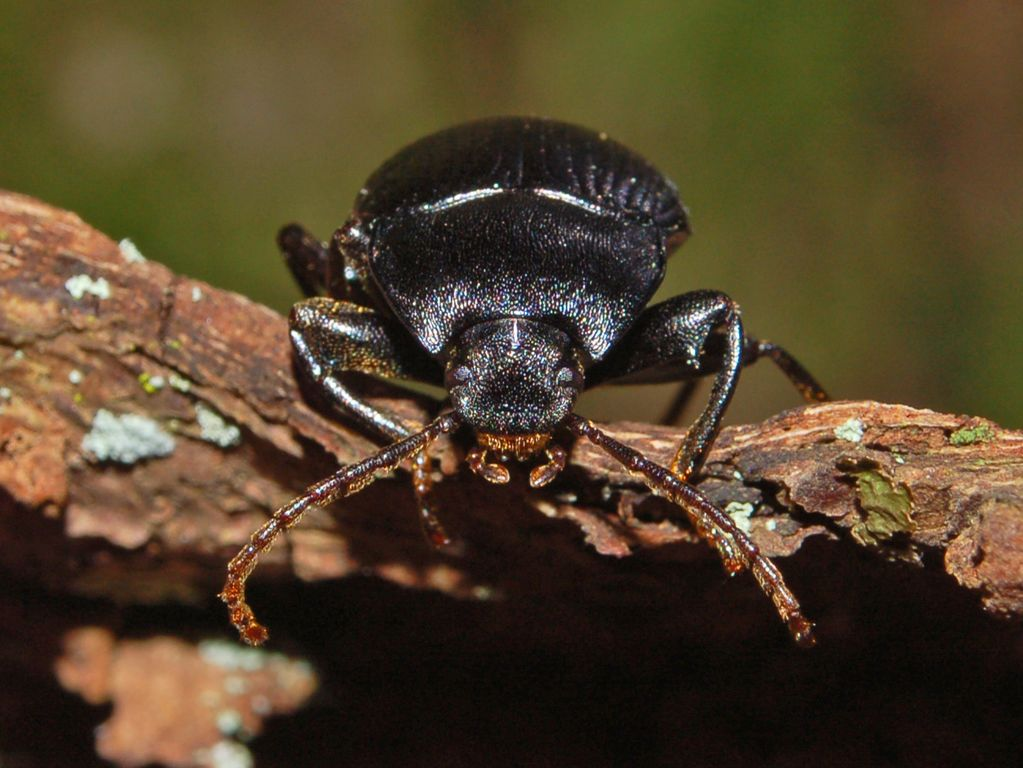
Frontal view – The tooth on the front femora is visible here

Accanthopus velikensis can reach a length of 9–10 millimetres (0.35–0.39 in). Very characteristic is the tooth on the inner edge of the front femora (hence the Latin word dentipes in the synonym Enoplopus dentipes). The adults live under the bark of trees and old stumps.

== Ecology ==
The adults live under the bark of trees and old stumps.

== Distribution ==
These beetles are mainly present in Albania, Bosnia, Bulgaria, Croatia, France, Italy, Greece, Serbia and Romania.
