= Ignaz Schiffermüller =

Austrian naturalist

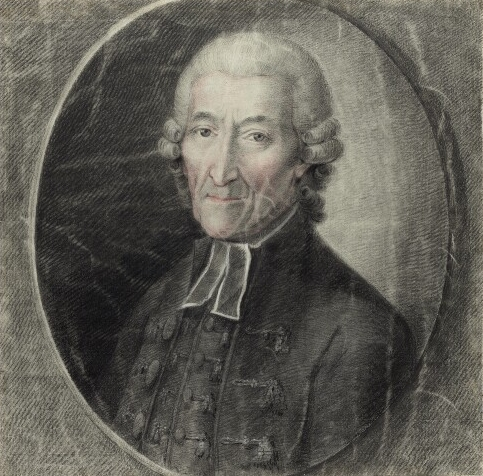
Portrait of Johann Ignaz Schiffermüller (origin unknown)

Jeremias "Johann" Ignaz Schiffermüller (Austrian German: [jereˈmiːas ˈiːɡnats ˈʃɪfɐˌmʏlɐ]; 2 November 1727 – 21 June 1806) was an Austrian naturalist and Jesuit teacher who took a special interest in the Lepidoptera. In order to describe the colours of butterflies, he also looked for a systematic approach to describing colours in nature and to standardize their names.

== Life and work ==
Schiffermüller was born in Hellmonsödt near Linz. The baptism record notes the name as Jeremias Ignatio, he was the eighth of ten children of master brewer Leopold Schiffermiller and Maria née Margottin. Jeremias Mitterbauer a meat seller was his godfather. After studies at Linz he joined the Jesuit order in Vienna at the age of nineteen. From 1752 to 1754 he taught at the Passau Grammar School. He became a teacher of architectural drawing at the Theresianum College in Vienna in 1759 and worked there for fifteen years. During this time he took an interest in natural history, collecting specimens of butterflies. His collection was presented to the old United Royal and Imperial Natural History Collections (Vereinigtes k.k. Naturalien-Cabinet) at the Hofburg where it burnt during the revolution in 1848. With Michael Denis, also a teacher at the Theresianum, he published the first index of the Lepidoptera of the Viennese region in the book Das Systematische Verzeichnis der Schmetterlinge der Wienergegend herausgegeben von einigen Lehrern am k. k. Theresianum (1775). Another work titled Ankündung eines systematischen Werkes von den Schmetterlingen der Wienergegend (1775) was distributed privately to various people including Carl Linnaeus. The work did not explicitly state his name as an author but described 1150 species. Because this work also included the names of some new butterfly species, it caused some nomenclatural problems for taxonomists. His collection is in the Kaiserlichen Hof-Naturalienkabinett (now Naturhistorisches Museum Wien). In 1775 he was named a royal councilor. After the Jesuit order was abolished in 1773 he moved to the Nordische Stift in Linz, a boarding school for Catholics from Scandinavia. In 1787 he moved to Waizenkirchen and then returned to Linz as a titular master and lived there until his death.

=== Colour system ===
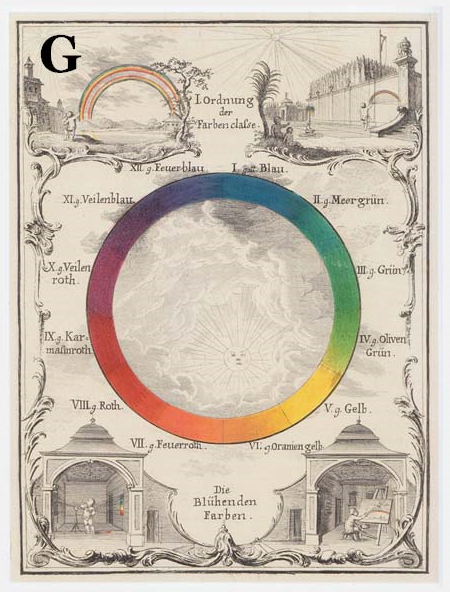
His 1772 color wheel

Schiffermüller is most noteworthy for his work in developing a scientifically based colour nomenclature to aid the description of butterfly coloration.

In his Versuch eines Farbensystems (1772), Schiffermüller addressed the need for a standardised nomenclature with which to describe the countless colours of nature. Work by predecessors in this field had proved unsatisfactory: he mentions suggestions made by Giovanni Antonio Scopoli (1723–1778) in his Entomologia Carniolica (1763) and August Johann Rösel (1705–1759) in his Insecten-Belustigung (1746–61). He made use of the work of L'optique des couleurs by the French Jesuit Louis Bertrand Castel (1688–1757). He included a colour circle for the saturated colours which he termed as "blühende Farben" (florid colors). It was among the first to place complementary colors opposite each other with 12 divisions: 4 reds, 4 blues, 3 greens, and 2 yellows. He however did not differentiate between pigments (subtractive) and prismatic (additive) colors. This color circle was also used as a basis by Franz Uibelaker (1781). He then tried to define tints of each colour. To serve as a model, Schiffermüller himself presents a table classifying and sub-classifying shades of blue, and naming them in German, Latin and French: in all, 81 German terms are listed. Matching this table, and using the same alphabetical notation, is a 3 x 12 matrix showing a set of colour samples for blue, with some discussion of the pigments used.

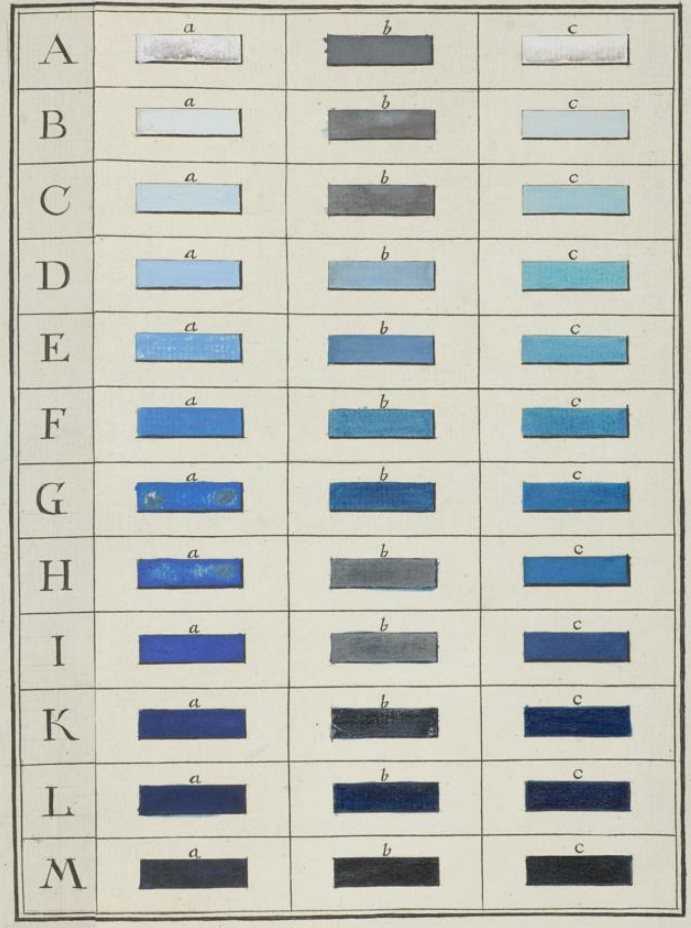
36 shades of blue

=== Lepidoptera ===
While at the Theresianum, several teachers were involved in entomological study, this included, apart from Schiffermüller, Sigismund Hohenwart (1730–1820), Matthias Piller (1733–1788), Ludwig Mitterpacher (1734–1814) and Michael Denis (1729–1800). They, termed as the Theresianer, published a systematic list in 1775 (or even possibly as early as 1771) and 1776 under the title of Ankündung eines systematischen Werkes von den Schmetterlingen der Wienergegen (1775) and the 1776 edition under the title “Systematisches Verzeichniss der Schmetterlinge der Wienergegend”. This work included illustrations of the 400 caterpillars and dealt with 1150 butterflies belonging to 150 species, some of them claimed as new but without proper descriptions. The associated specimens were entirely destroyed in 1848 during the Hofburg fire. The book itself did not bear the names of the authors but some authors have used the species names with the authorship of "[Denis & Schiffermüller], 1775". This convention was upheld by the ICZN in Opinion 516 of 1970. It has however been argued that the authority should solely be Schiffermüller.

== Honours ==
The Ignaz-Schiffermüller Medal of the Entomological Society of America is awarded for an important monographs with a taxonomic and zoogeographical focus.

The lycaenid butterfly subspecies Pseudophilotes vicrama schiffermuelleri (Hemming 1929)and the moth genus Schiffermuelleria named by Hübner in 1825 honour him.

== Works ==
- Versuch eines Farbensystems, Vienna 1772
