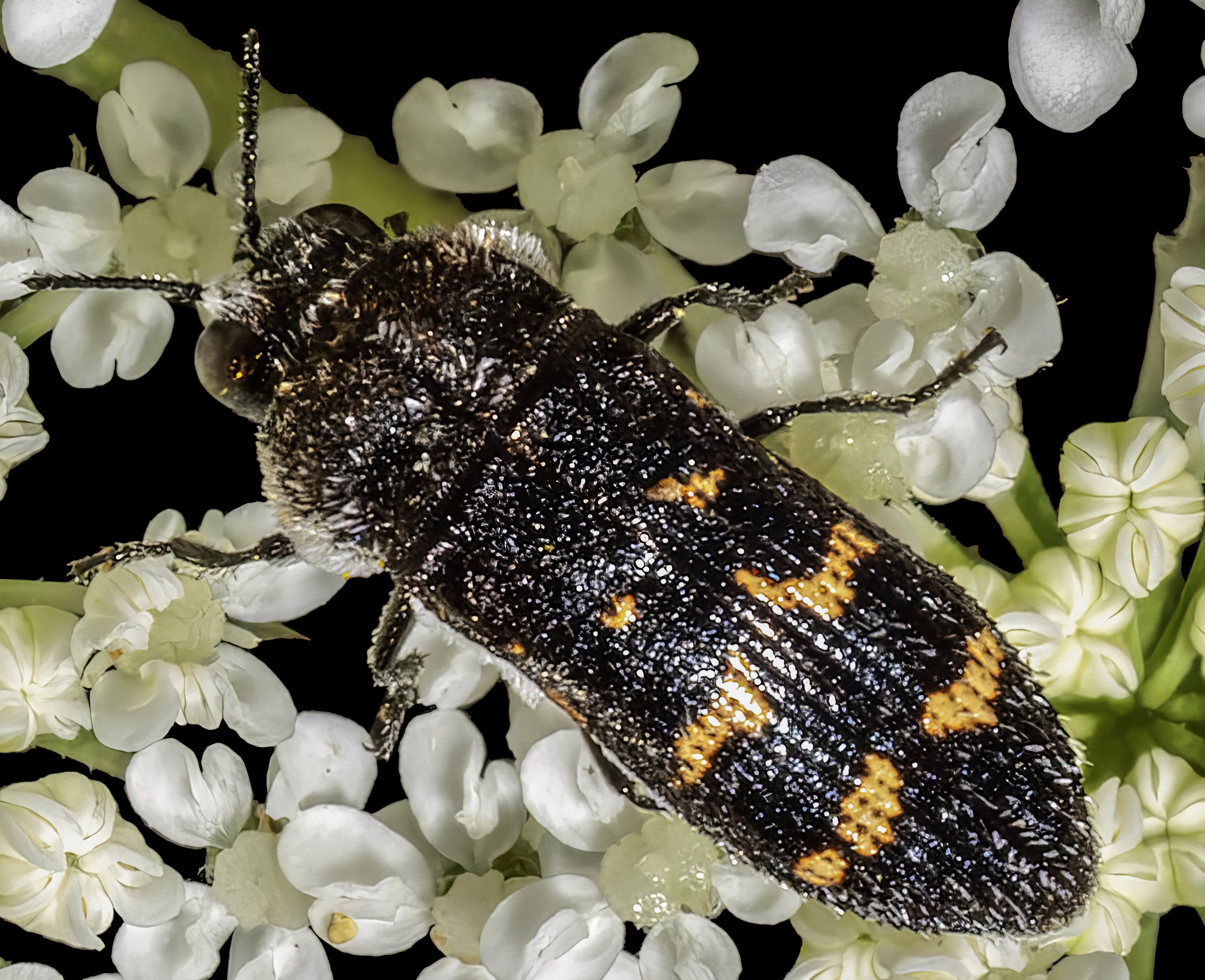

Scientific classification
- Domain: Eukaryota
- Kingdom: Animalia
- Phylum: Arthropoda
- Class: Insecta
- Order: Coleoptera
- Suborder: Polyphaga
- Infraorder: Elateriformia
- Family: Buprestidae
- Genus: Acmaeoderella
- Species: A. flavofasciata

Binomial name
- Acmaeoderella flavofasciata (Piller & Mitterpacher, 1763)

Synonyms
- Acmaeodera buresi (Obenberger, 1935); Acmaeodera deorum (Obenberger, 1940); Acmaeodera dispersenotata (Pic, 1918); Acmaeodera unifasciata (Rey, 1890); Buprestis flavofasciata (Piller & Mitterpacher, 1783); Buprestis hirta (Villers, 1789); Buprestis taeniata (Fabricius, 1787); Buprestis volvulus (Fabricius, 1793)

= Acmaeoderella flavofasciata =

Species of beetle

Acmaeoderella flavofasciata is a species of jewel beetles belonging to the family Buprestidae, subfamily Polycestinae.

This beetle is present in most of Europe, in the eastern Palearctic realm, and in North Africa.

The adults are 6.5–11.0 millimetres (0.26–0.43 in) long. Head and pronotum are wrinkled and hairy.

Main larval host plants are in genus Acer, Castanea, Fagus, Juniperus, Populus, Prunus, Pyrus, Quercus and Ulmus.
