= Acmaeoderella zeravshanica =

Scientific classification
- Kingdom: Animalia
- Phylum: Arthropoda
- Clade: Pancrustacea
- Class: Insecta
- Order: Coleoptera
- Suborder: Polyphaga
- Infraorder: Elateriformia
- Family: Buprestidae
- Genus: Acmaeoderella
- Species: A. zeravshanica

Binomial name
- Acmaeoderella zeravshanica Volkovitsh, 1987

Species of beetle

Acmaeoderella zeravshanica is a species of jewel beetle in the family Buprestidae, subgenus Acmacoderella, genus Acmaeoderella. It was described in 1987 by Russian entomologist M.G. Volkovitsh based on specimens collected in the Takhtakaracha mountain pass, part of the western Zeravshan Range (Uzbekistan). Acmaeoderella zeravshanica is a small but bright beetle, with a prominent, easily recognizable pattern on otherwise black elytra, consisting of four yellowish to cream-colored spots symmetrically arranged in two pairs on each elytron, together forming a distinct square pattern. Acmaeoderella zeravshanica is a narrow-ranged species endemic to Uzbekistan.

== Etymology ==
The species name zeravshanica refers to the Zeravshan mountains, the region where the species was first discovered.

== Type ==
The species was described from adult beetles and larvae collected by Czech entomologist Vítězslav Kubáň in late June and early July 1983. The material was gathered at an altitude of 1600 meters in the Takhtakaracha pass, located between Samarkand and Shahrisabz. The holotype, a female, is deposited in Kubáň’s private collection in Brno, Czech Republic. Seven paratypes (five males and two females) are split between his collection and the Zoological Institute of the Russian Academy of Sciences in Saint Petersburg. Larvae were collected from within the stems of Lepidolopha (Asteraceae) at the same site, where adults were also present.

== Description ==
Adult Acmaeoderella zeravshanica are small, robust, and cylindrical beetles, measuring 5.1–5.7 mm in length and 1.7–1.9 mm in width. The overall coloration is black to black-bronze, with elytra that may be uniformly dark or adorned with four pale yellow spots symmetrically arranged on the 5th to 8th intervals anteriorly and the 3rd to 5th posteriorly.

The head has a fine, cell-like sculpture with shiny depressions and short lanceolate scales. Antennae are long and sexually dimorphic, expanding from the fifth segment onward. The pronotum is rounded and moderately convex with coarse sculpturing and a faint central groove. Elytral puncture rows are deep but shallowly impressed, and the intervals are flat to weakly raised, some with faint rasp-like textures. The body is sparsely covered in short, narrow scales, denser along the sides. Legs and claws are dark with a bronze sheen.

Larvae are elongate, covered in sparse long setae (hair-like structures). They exhibit distinct mandibles with a terminal tooth and four small subapical teeth. Thoracic spiracles are reduced and irregular in shape, while abdominal spiracles are relatively large and unicameral.

Acmaeoderella zeravshanica belongs to a poorly studied group of species closely related to A. levantina, which also includes A. plavilscikovi, A. oresitropha, and A. elbursi. Within this group, A. zeravshanica is most similar to the Turanian species A. plavilscikovi, but differs in elytral sculpture, pronotal scaling, and ovipositor structure.

== Habitat and distribution ==
Acmaeoderella zeravshanica is known only from the Takhtakaracha pass (Samarkand region) in the western Zeravshan range of Uzbekistan. It inhabits dry, mountainous environments at approximately 1600 meters elevation. The species is associated with xerophytic slopes where the host plant Lepidolopha occurs.

== Biology ==
Larvae develop within the woody stems of Lepidolopha. They co-occur with those of another jewel beetle Acmaeodera lata, though the latter prefer thicker branches and differ in morphology and life strategy. A parasitoid braconid wasp from the genus Rhaconotus (subfamily Doryctinae) was reared from collected larvae. Other aspects of the beetle’s biology, including seasonality and life cycle duration, remain poorly known.

== Conservation status ==
No formal conservation status has been assigned to Acmaeoderella zeravshanica, but its restricted range and habitat specificity suggest it may be vulnerable.
