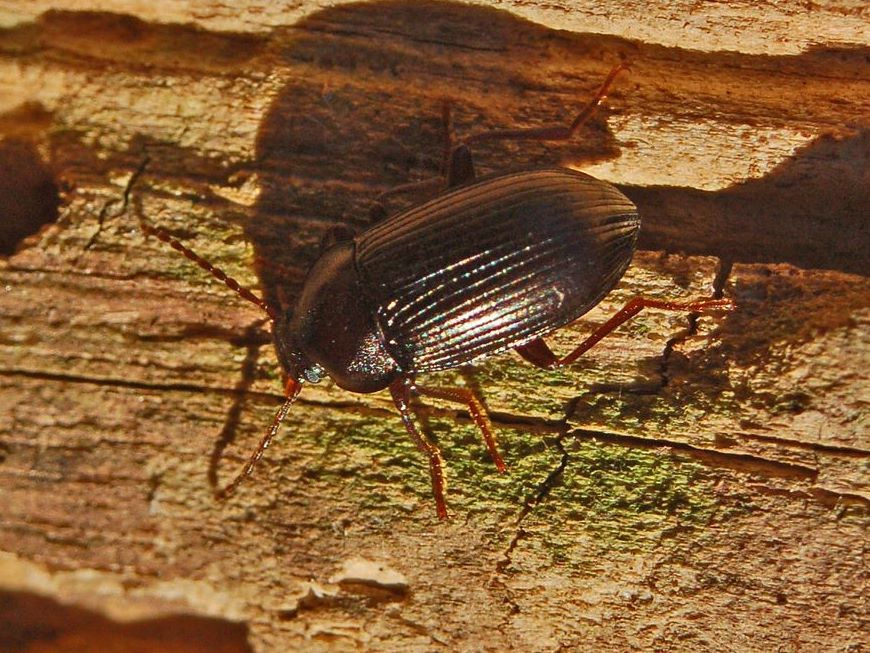

Scientific classification
- Domain: Eukaryota
- Kingdom: Animalia
- Phylum: Arthropoda
- Class: Insecta
- Order: Coleoptera
- Suborder: Polyphaga
- Infraorder: Cucujiformia
- Family: Tenebrionidae
- Subfamily: Tenebrioninae
- Tribe: Helopini
- Subtribe: Cylindrinotina
- Genus: Nalassus
- Species: N. dryadophilus

Binomial name
- Nalassus dryadophilus ( Mulsant, 1854)

= Nalassus dryadophilus =

Species of beetle

Nalassus dryadophilus is a species of darkling beetles belonging to the subfamily Tenebrioninae.

They are mainly present in Albania, Bulgaria, Croatia, France, Italy, Greece, and Romania.

The adults grow up to 7–8 millimetres (0.28–0.31 in) long and can mostly be encountered under the bark of old trees.
