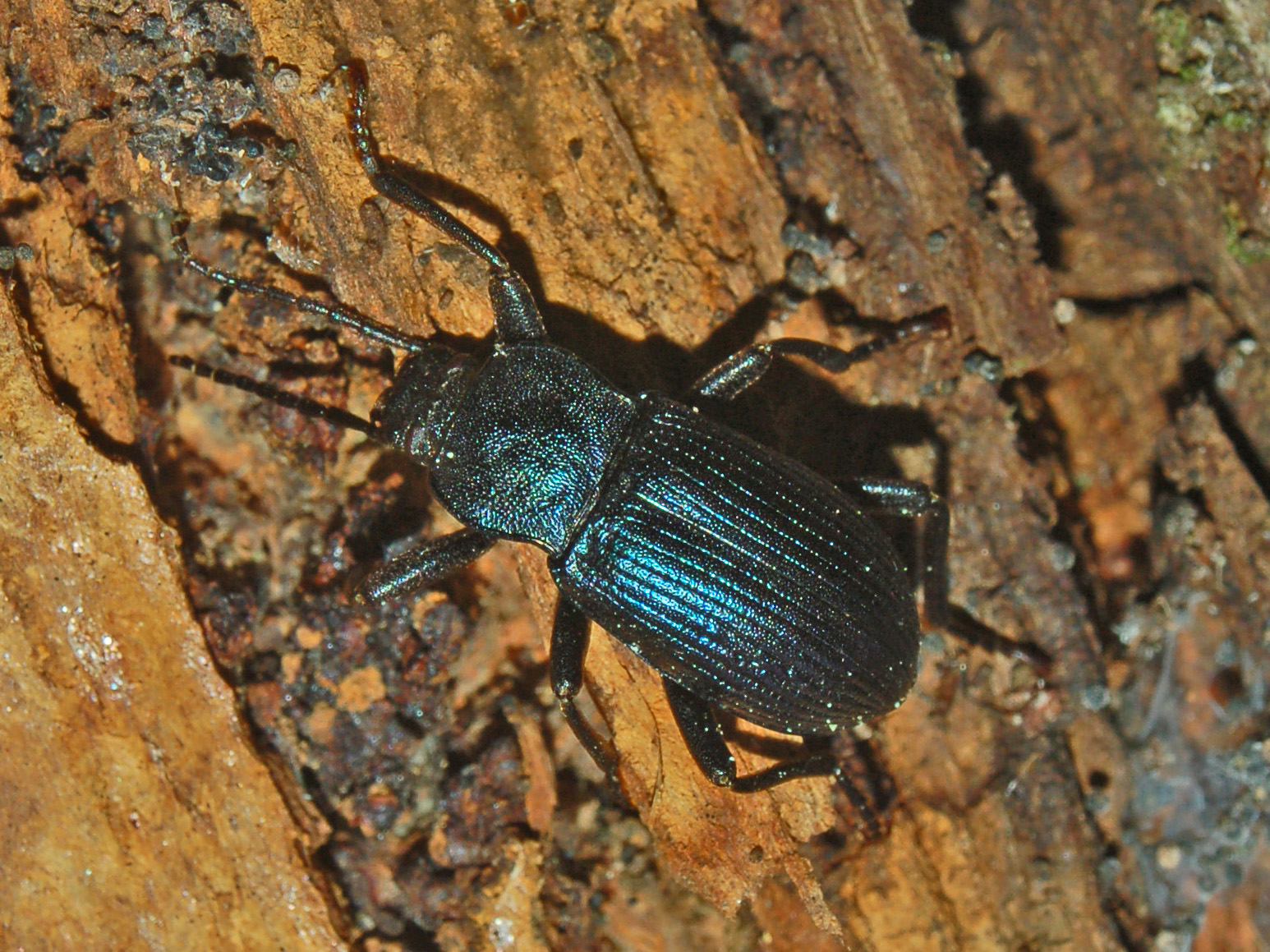
- Helops sp.

Scientific classification
- Kingdom: Animalia
- Phylum: Arthropoda
- Class: Insecta
- Order: Coleoptera
- Suborder: Polyphaga
- Infraorder: Cucujiformia
- Family: Tenebrionidae
- Subfamily: Tenebrioninae
- Tribe: Helopini
- Genus: Helops; Fabricius, 1775

= Helops =

Genus of beetles

Helops is a genus of darkling beetles (insects belonging to the family Tenebrionidae) in the subfamily Tenebrioninae.

== Species ==
- Helops aereus Germar, 1824
- Helops atticus Redtenbach in Ungern, 1867†
- Helops cisteloides Germar
- Helops coeruleus (Linnaeus, 1758)
- Helops glabriventris Reitter, 1885
- Helops gracilis Bland, 1863
- Helops meissneri Heer, 1847†
- Helops molassicus Heer, 1883†
- Helops rossii Germar, 1817
- Helops thoracicus Grimm, 1991
- Helops wetteravicus Heyden, 1865†
