= Wilhelm Junk =

Czech antiquarian bookseller and entomologist (1866–1942)

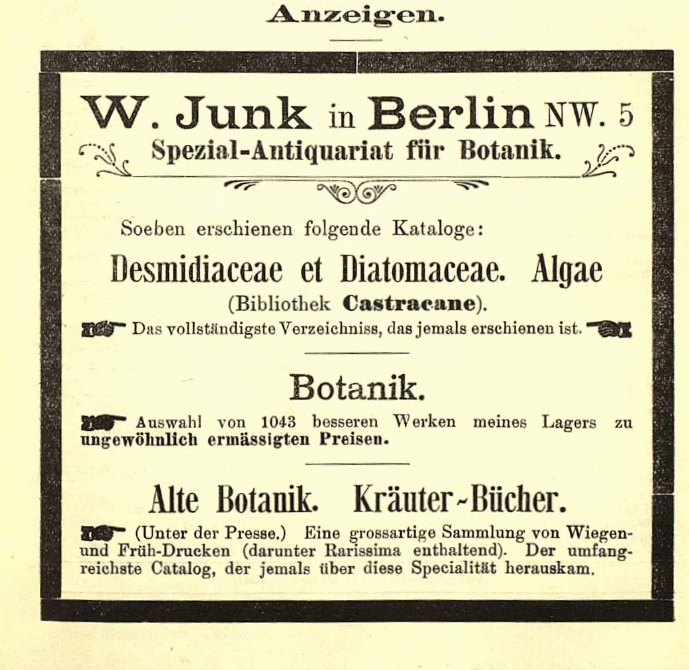
Advertising W. Junk in Berlin W 5 Spezial-Antiquariat für Botanik (about 1900)

Wilhelm Junk born Jeitteles (3 February 1866, Prague – 3 December 1942, The Hague) was a noted Czech antiquarian bookseller in the field of natural history, and an entomologist.

Wilhelm was born in Prague in a family with numerous pharmacists. His father Joseph Jeitteles (c. 1830–c. 1913) was a pharmacist and his mother Caroline Sobotka (c. 1844–c. 1878) came from a family of Prague industrialists. He was baptized as a Protestant and changed his name to Junk in 1890. After high school, he worked with his bookseller uncle Julius Friedländer in Berlin around 1882. He also attended lectures at the university and in 1891 became a partner at R. Friedländer & Sohn. He left Friedländer in 1899 and established his book dealership "Antiquariaat Junk", in 1899 in Berlin. He soon became the leading dealer in works on natural history in Europe. From the 1923 to 1933 was a period of great prosperity for book traders in Berlin, many who were Jewish (there was even a mildly pejorative term Bücherjuden or "book jews"). Junk also edited and published bibliographic reference works, notably Lepidopterorum Catalogus edited by Embrik Strand, and Coleopterorum Catalogus edited by Junk himself and Sigmund Schenkling. A Jewish refugee, he moved his shop to The Hague in the 1930s. He sold his business to Rudolph Schierenberg in 1935. It still operates as "Antiquariaat Junk".

He was a Doctor of Philosophy honoris causae, an honour conferred by both the University of Frankfurt and University of Innsbruck. At the end of 1942 the Gestapo were expected to arrest Junk and just before they arrived, he and his wife committed suicide.

== Works ==
Incomplete list

- Rara Historico Naturalia Berlin (1900-1939). The first bibliographical reference work for natural history giving detailed bibliographical, historical, and scientific information.
- Bibliographia botanica W. Junk, Berlin (1909-1916).
- Schnörkel um Bücher respective naturwissenschaftliche Kinkerlitzchen an‘s Licht gebracht vom Doctor Junk Berlin (1930).

== See also ==
Mycopathologia
