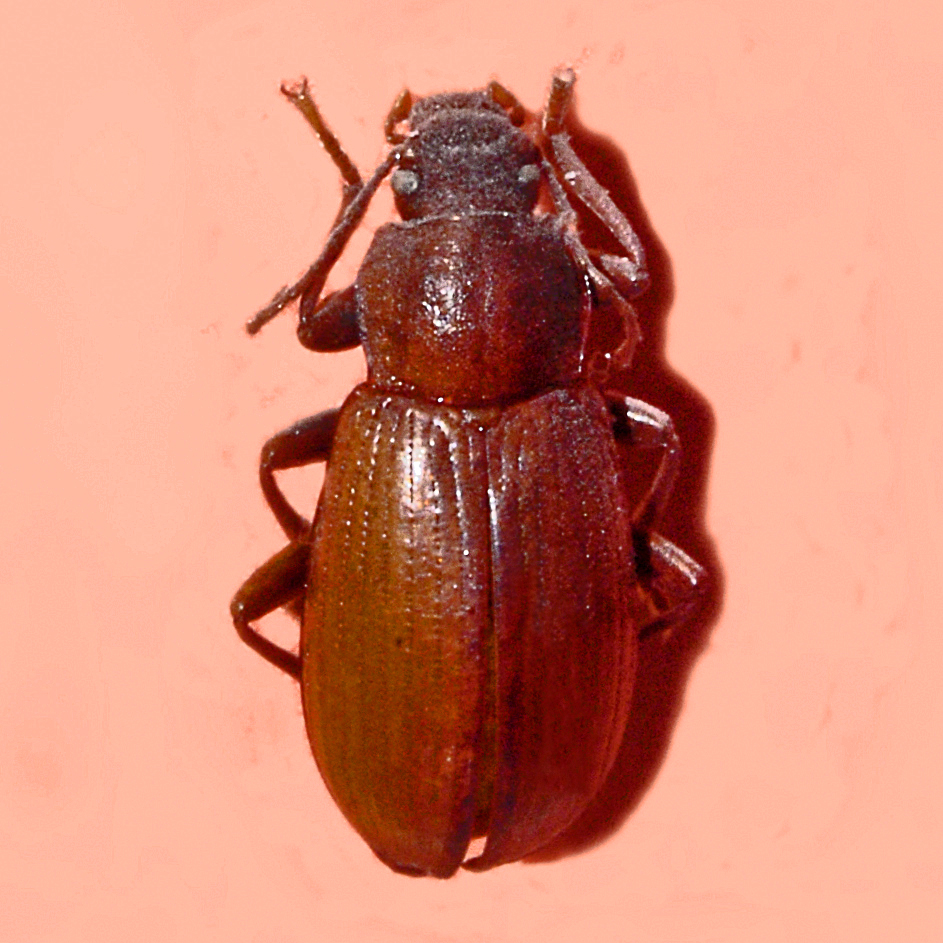
- Stenomax aeneus

Scientific classification
- Kingdom: Animalia
- Phylum: Arthropoda
- Class: Insecta
- Order: Coleoptera
- Suborder: Polyphaga
- Infraorder: Cucujiformia
- Family: Tenebrionidae
- Tribe: Helopini
- Genus: Stenomax; Allard, 1876

= Stenomax =

Genus of beetles

Stenomax is a genus of darkling beetles (insects belonging to the family Tenebrionidae) in the subfamily Tenebrioninae.

== Species ==
- Stenomax aeneus (Scopoli, 1763)
- Stenomax foudrasi (Mulsant & God, 1854)
- Stenomax meridianus (Mulsant, 1854)
- Stenomax piceus (Sturm, 1826)
- Stenomax steindachneri (Apfelebeck, 1906)
