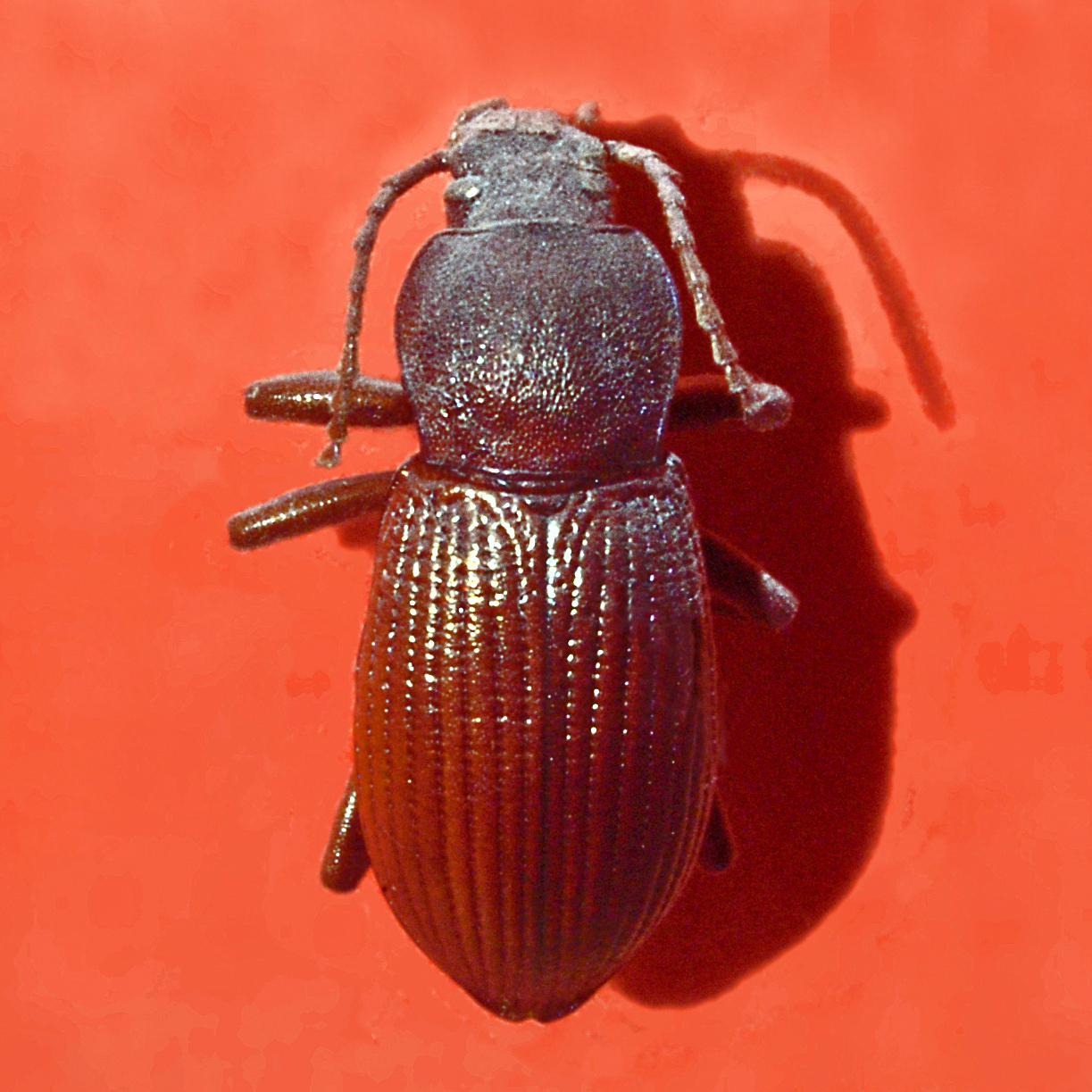
- Helops rossii. Museum specimen

Scientific classification
- Kingdom: Animalia
- Phylum: Arthropoda
- Class: Insecta
- Order: Coleoptera
- Suborder: Polyphaga
- Infraorder: Cucujiformia
- Family: Tenebrionidae
- Genus: Helops
- Species: H. rossii

Binomial name
- Helops rossii Germar, 1817

Synonyms
- Tenebrio violaceus Thunberg, 1817

= Helops rossii =

Species of beetle

Helops rossii is a species of darkling beetles (insects belonging to the family Tenebrionidae) in the subfamily Tenebrioninae.

== Description ==
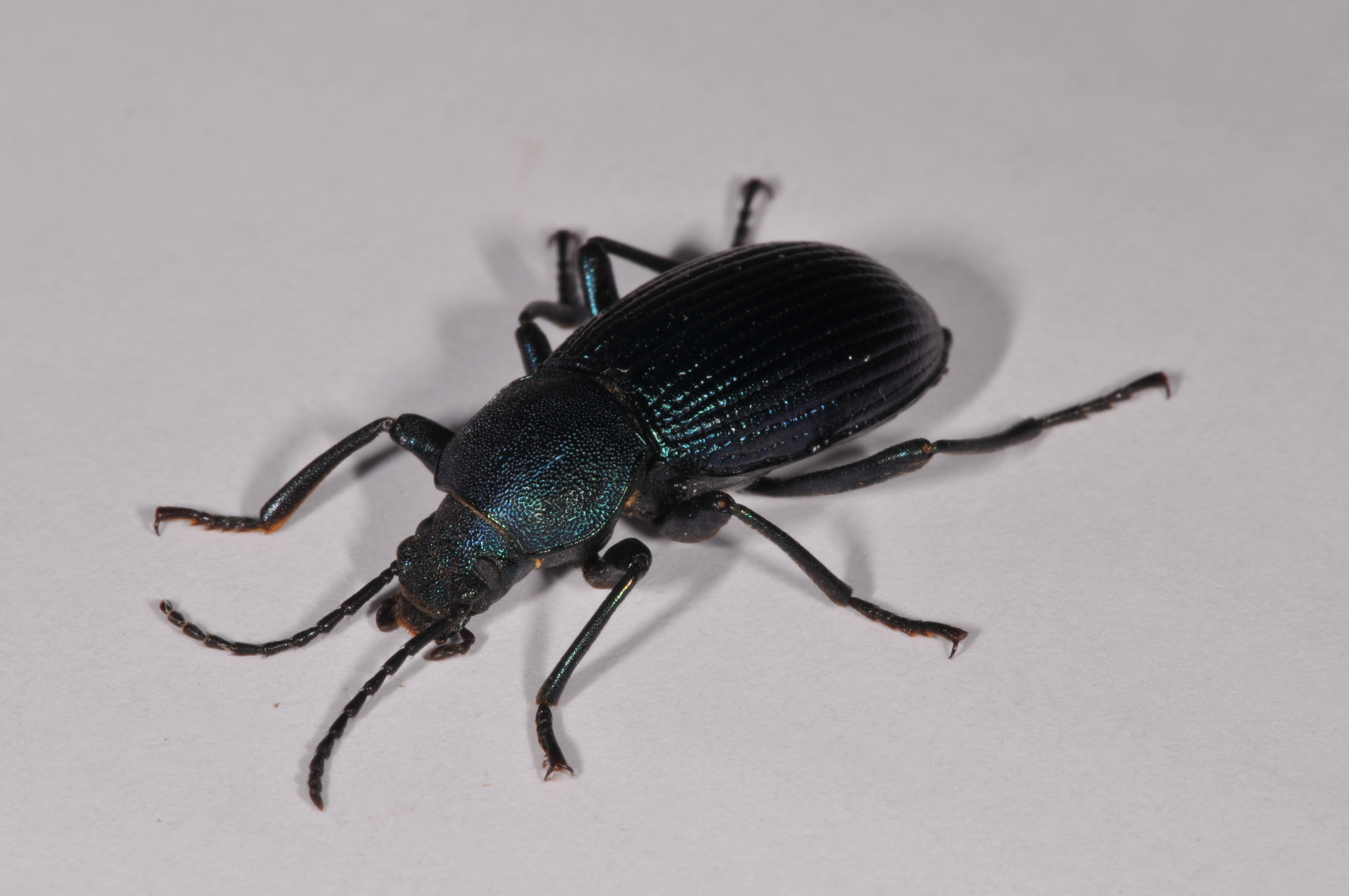
A live individual of Helops rossii

Helops rossii can reach a length of 13–20 millimetres (0.51–0.79 in). Body is metallic blue-black in color. These beetles can be found from January to December.

== Distribution ==
This species is present in Austria, Croatia, Italy and Montenegro.
