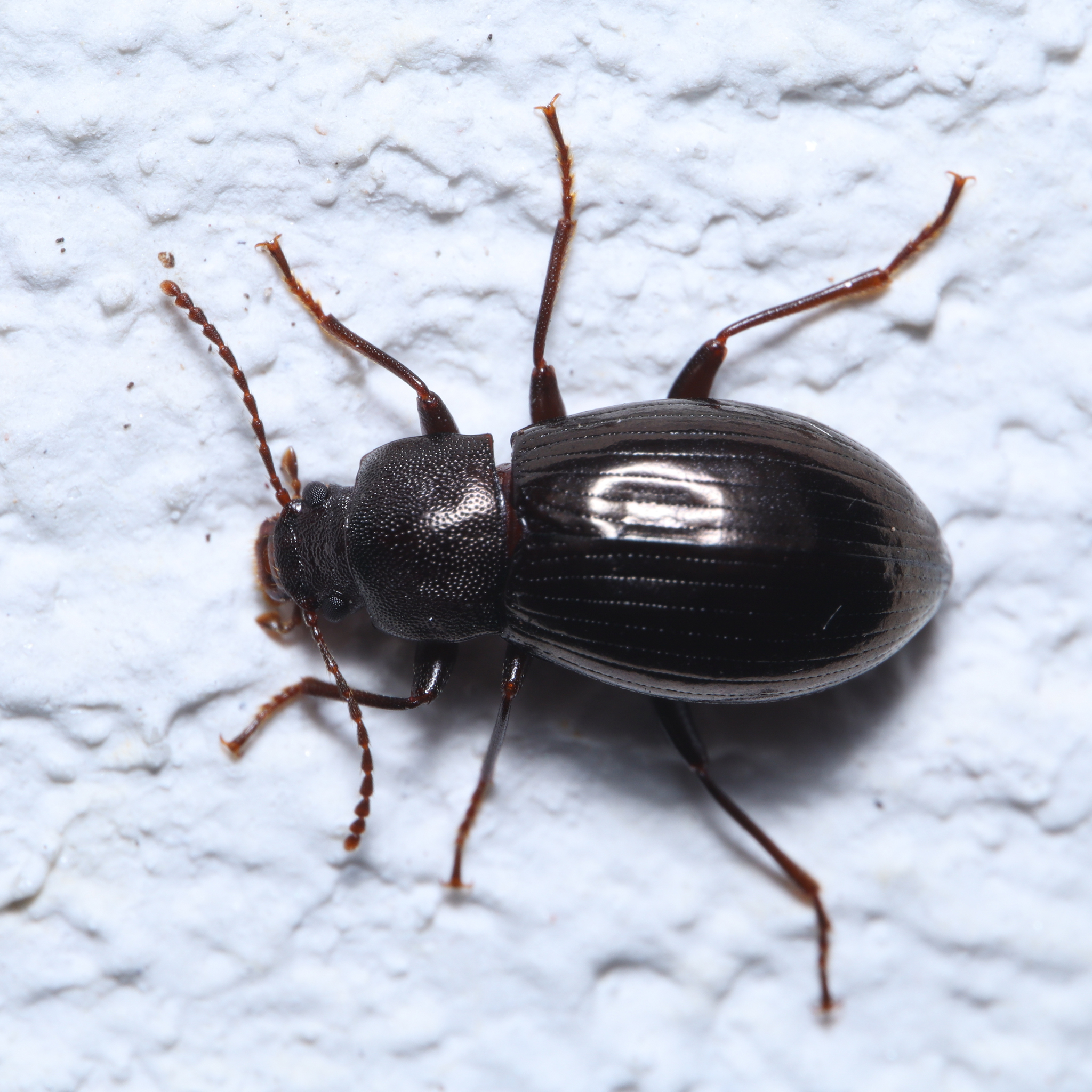
- Nalassus aereus, North Carolina

Scientific classification
- Kingdom: Animalia
- Phylum: Arthropoda
- Class: Insecta
- Order: Coleoptera
- Suborder: Polyphaga
- Infraorder: Cucujiformia
- Family: Tenebrionidae
- Subfamily: Tenebrioninae
- Tribe: Helopini
- Subtribe: Cylindrinotina
- Genus: Nalassus; Mulsant, 1854

Subgenera
- Caucasonotus Nabozhenko, 2000; Horistelops Gozis, 1910; Nalassus Mulsant, 1854; Nipponalassus Nabozhenko & Ando, 2018

Synonyms
- Caucasonotus Nabozhenko, 2000; Cylindronotus Agassiz, 1846

= Nalassus =

Genus of beetles

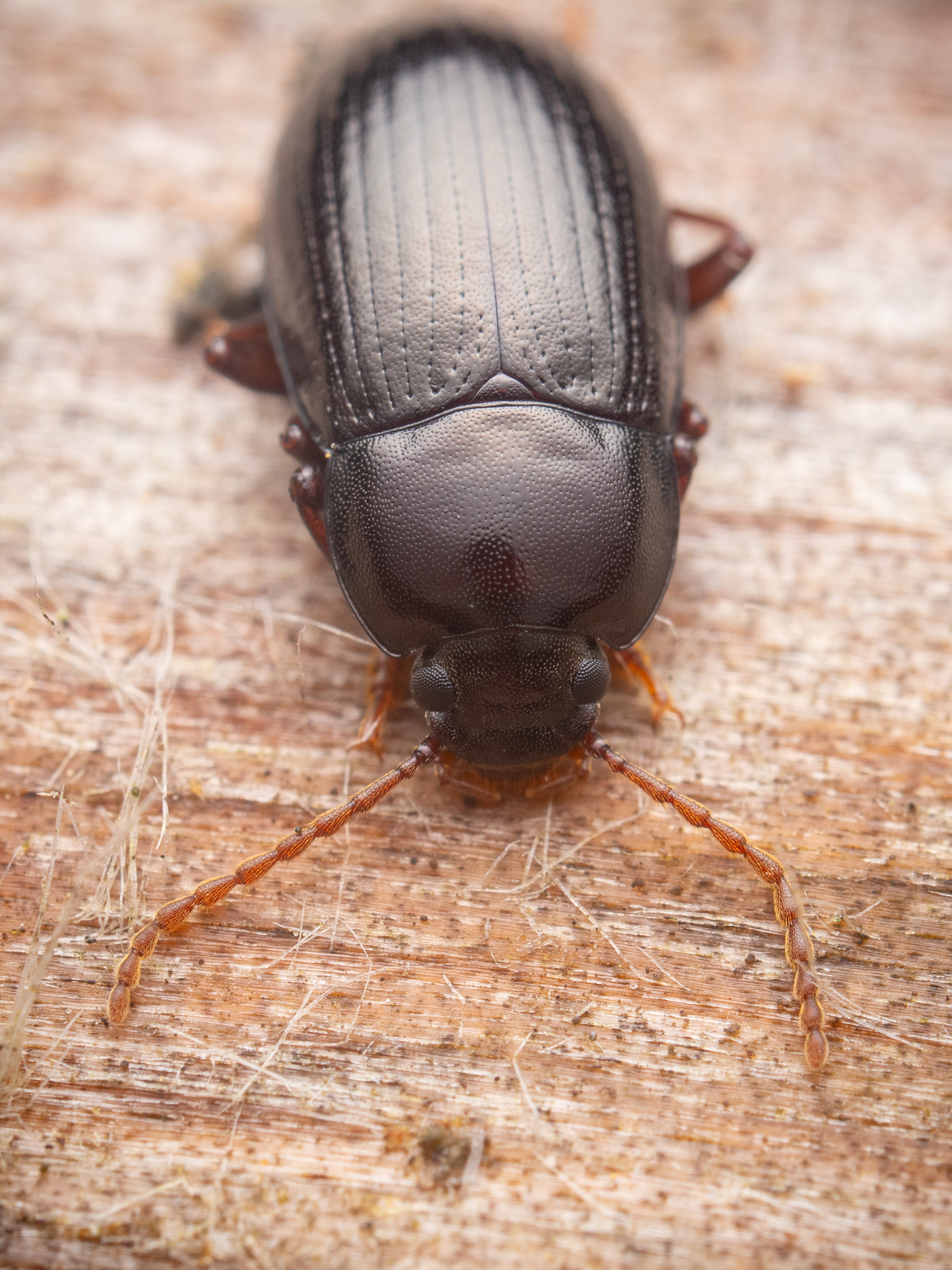
Nalassus dermestoides, Germany

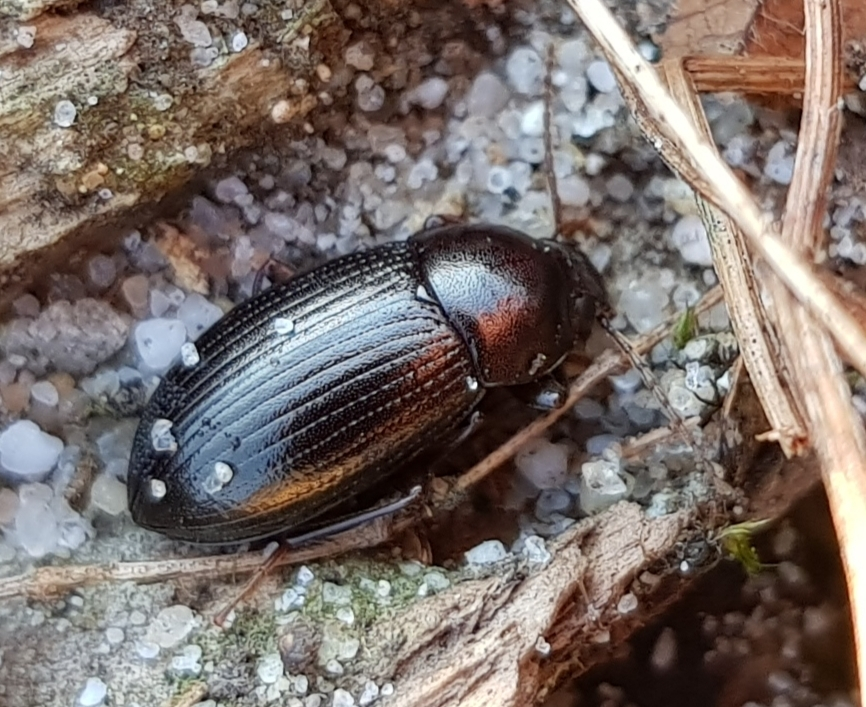
Nalassus laevioctostriatus, Netherlands

Nalassus is a genus of darkling beetles in the family Tenebrionidae. There are more than 70 described species in Nalassus, in the Palearctic and North America.

== Species ==
These 71 species belong to the genus Nalassus:

- Nalassus abeillei (Seidlitz, 1896)
- Nalassus abkhasicus Nabozhenko, 2001
- Nalassus adriani (Reitter, 1922)
- Nalassus adzharicus Nabozhenko & Dzhambazishvili, 2001
- Nalassus aemulus (Küster, 1850)
- Nalassus aereus (Germar, 1824)
- Nalassus akitai (Masumoto, 1998)
- Nalassus alanicus Nabozhenko, 2000
- Nalassus alpigradus (Fairmaire, 1882)
- Nalassus andoi (Masumoto, 1993)
- Nalassus arcanus Nabozhenko, 2001
- Nalassus assimilis (Küster, 1850)
- Nalassus brevicollis (Krynicky, 1832)
- Nalassus brunneus (Marseul, 1876)
- Nalassus californicus (Mannerheim, 1843)
- Nalassus calpensis (Champion, 1891)
- Nalassus cambyses (Seidlitz, 1896)
- Nalassus colasi Español, 1961
- Nalassus colchicus Nabozhenko, 2001
- Nalassus convexulus (LeConte, 1861)
- Nalassus convexus (Küster, 1850)
- Nalassus crenatostriatus (Allard, 1876)
- Nalassus cyrensis (Bogatshev, 1946)
- Nalassus dermestoides (Illiger, 1798)
- Nalassus dissonus Nabozhenko, 2001
- Nalassus diteras (Allard, 1876)
- Nalassus dombaicus Nabozhenko, 2000
- Nalassus dongurii (Masumoto, Akita & Lee, 2017)
- Nalassus dryadophilus (Mulsant, 1854)
- Nalassus ecoffeti (Küster, 1850)
- Nalassus elegantulus (Lewis, 1894)
- Nalassus estrellensis (Kraatz, 1870)
- Nalassus faldermanni (Dejean in Faldermann, 1837)
- Nalassus farsistanus Nabozhenko & Grimm, 2018
- Nalassus formosanus (Masumoto, 1981)
- Nalassus genei (Gené, 1839)
- Nalassus gloriosus (Faldermann, 1837)
- Nalassus graecus (Seidlitz, 1896)
- Nalassus harpaloides (Küster, 1850)
- Nalassus kalashiani Nabozhenko, 2001
- Nalassus kaszabi Nabozhenko, 2001
- Nalassus kawabatai (Akita & Masumoto, 2012)
- Nalassus kochi Español, 1961
- Nalassus laevioctostriatus (Goeze, 1777)
- Nalassus lewisi (Masumoto, 1993)
- Nalassus lineatus (Allard, 1877)
- Nalassus longipennis (Küster, 1850)
- Nalassus ludmilae Nabozhenko, 2001
- Nalassus lutshniki Nabozhenko, 2001
- Nalassus magomedrasuli Nabozhenko, 2023
- Nalassus magyari (Kaszab, 1968)
- Nalassus merkli (Masumoto, Akita & Lee, 2017)
- Nalassus negrobovi Nabozhenko, 2022
- Nalassus olgae Nabozhenko & Ivanov, 2015
- Nalassus ophonoides (Lucas, 1849)
- Nalassus pharnaces Allard, 1876
- Nalassus picinus (Küster, 1850)
- Nalassus pilushenmuus (Masumoto, Akita & Lee, 2017)
- Nalassus planipennis (Küster, 1850)
- Nalassus plebejus (Küster, 1850)
- Nalassus romashovi Nabozhenko, 2001
- Nalassus sareptanus (Allard, 1876)
- Nalassus skopini Español, 1961
- Nalassus striatissimus Nabozhenko & Grimm, 2018
- Nalassus svaneticus Nabozhenko & Dzhambazishvili, 2001
- Nalassus tenebrioides (Germar, 1813)
- Nalassus xiaoxueshanus (Masumoto, Akita & Lee, 2017)
- Nalassus yuanfengus (Masumoto, Akita & Lee, 2017)
- Nalassus zakatalensis Nabozhenko, 2001
- Nalassus zaratustrai Nabozhenko, 2006
- Nalassus zoltani (Masumoto, 1981)
