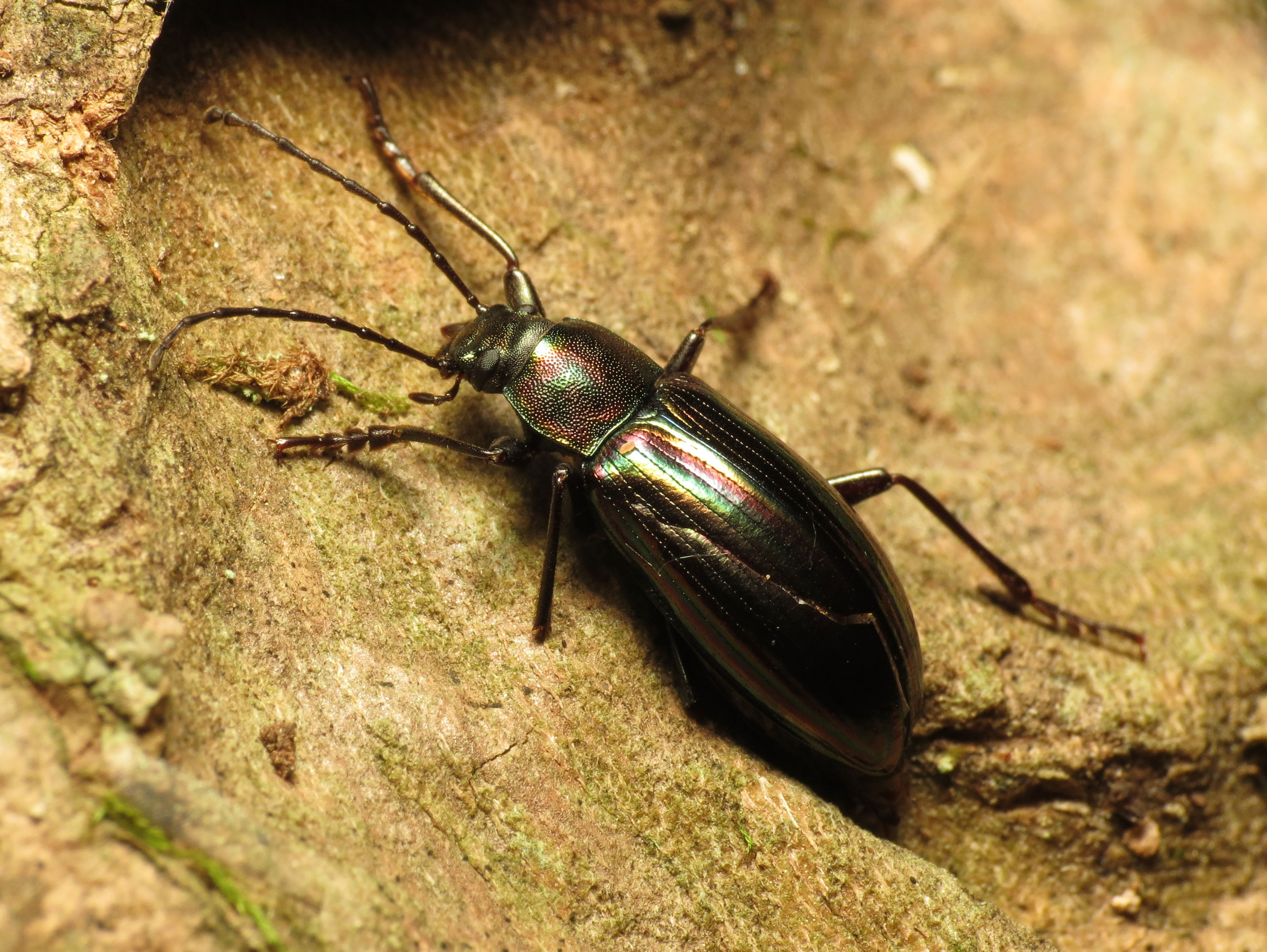
- Tarpela micans

Scientific classification
- Domain: Eukaryota
- Kingdom: Animalia
- Phylum: Arthropoda
- Class: Insecta
- Order: Coleoptera
- Suborder: Polyphaga
- Infraorder: Cucujiformia
- Family: Tenebrionidae
- Tribe: Helopini
- Genus: Tarpela; Bates, 1870

= Tarpela =

Genus of beetles

Tarpela is a genus of darkling beetles in the family Tenebrionidae. There are about five described species in Tarpela.

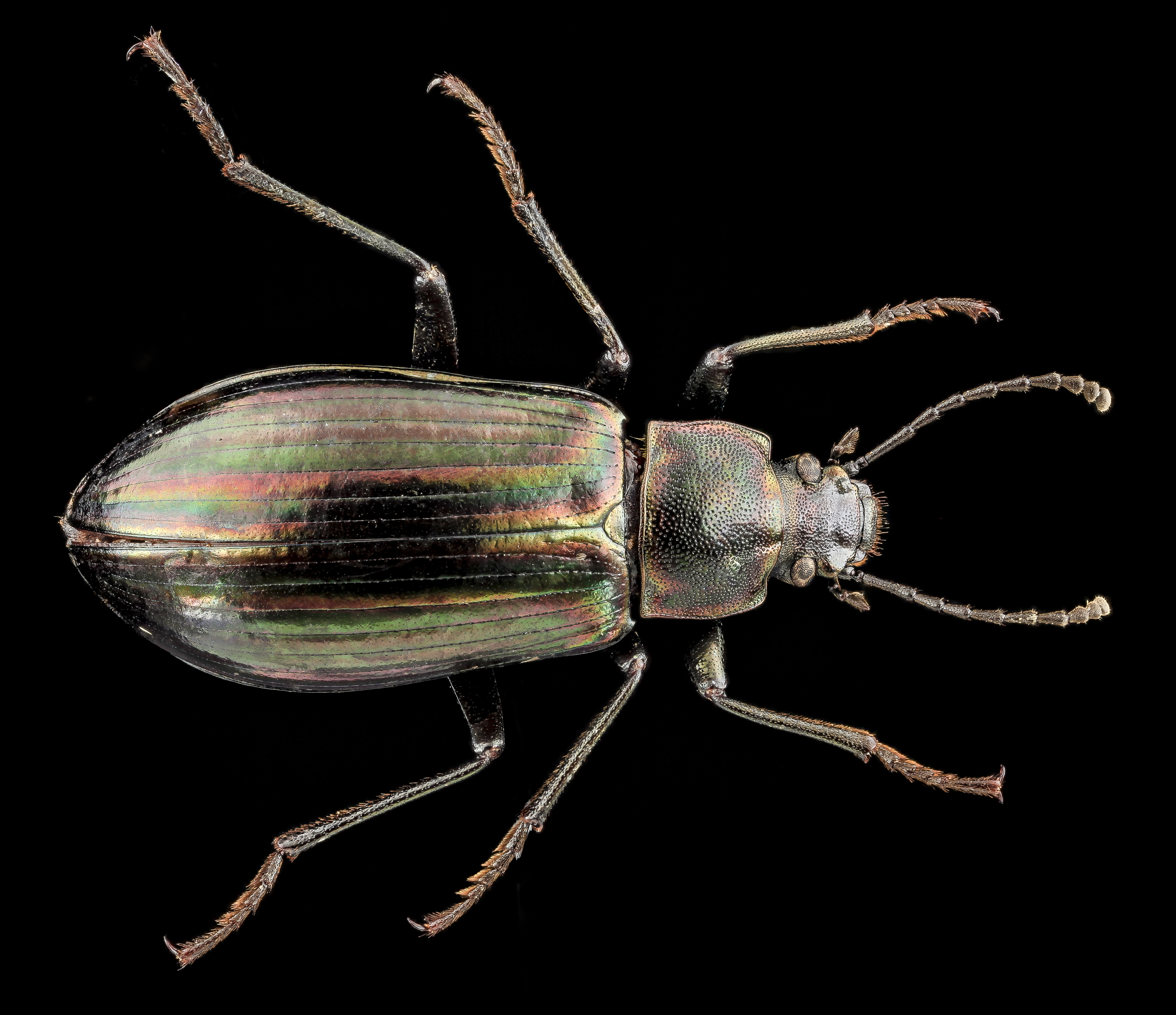
Tarpela micans

== Species ==
These five species belong to the genus Tarpela:

- Tarpela formosana Masumoto, 1981^{g}
- Tarpela micans (Fabricius, 1798)^{g b}
- Tarpela undulata (LeConte, 1866)^{b}
- Tarpela venusta (Say, 124)^{b}
- Tarpela zoltani Masumoto, 1981^{g}

Data sources: i = ITIS, c = Catalogue of Life, g = GBIF, b = Bugguide.net
