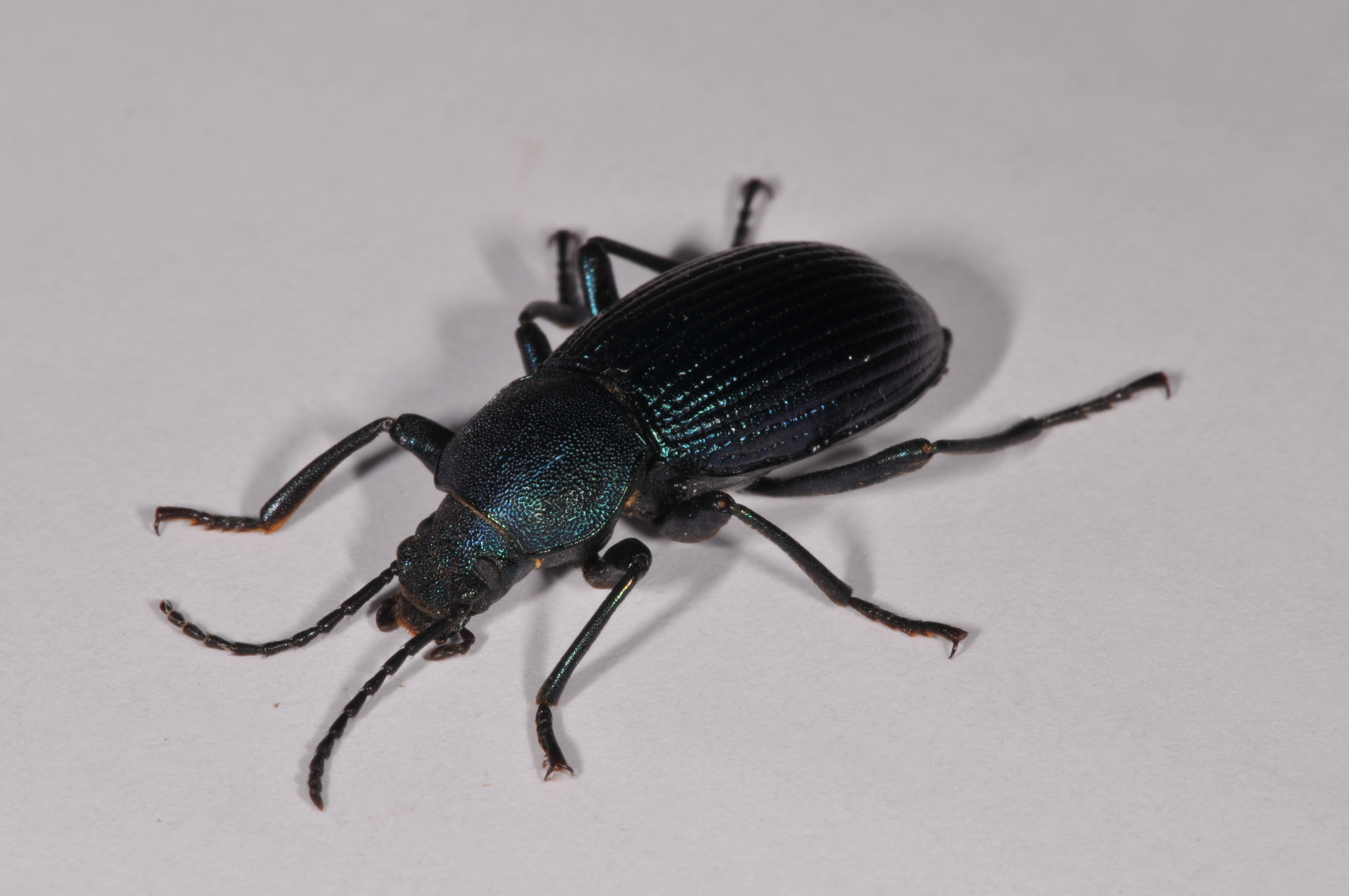
- Helops rossii, Croatia.jpg

Scientific classification
- Kingdom: Animalia
- Phylum: Arthropoda
- Class: Insecta
- Order: Coleoptera
- Suborder: Polyphaga
- Infraorder: Cucujiformia
- Family: Tenebrionidae
- Subfamily: Tenebrioninae
- Tribe: Helopini; Latreille, 1802

Subtribes
- Cylindrinotina Español, 1956; Enoplopodina Reitter, 1917; Helopina Latreille, 1802

= Helopini =

Tribe of beetles

Helopini is a tribe of darkling beetles in the family Tenebrionidae. There are at least 50 genera in Helopini.

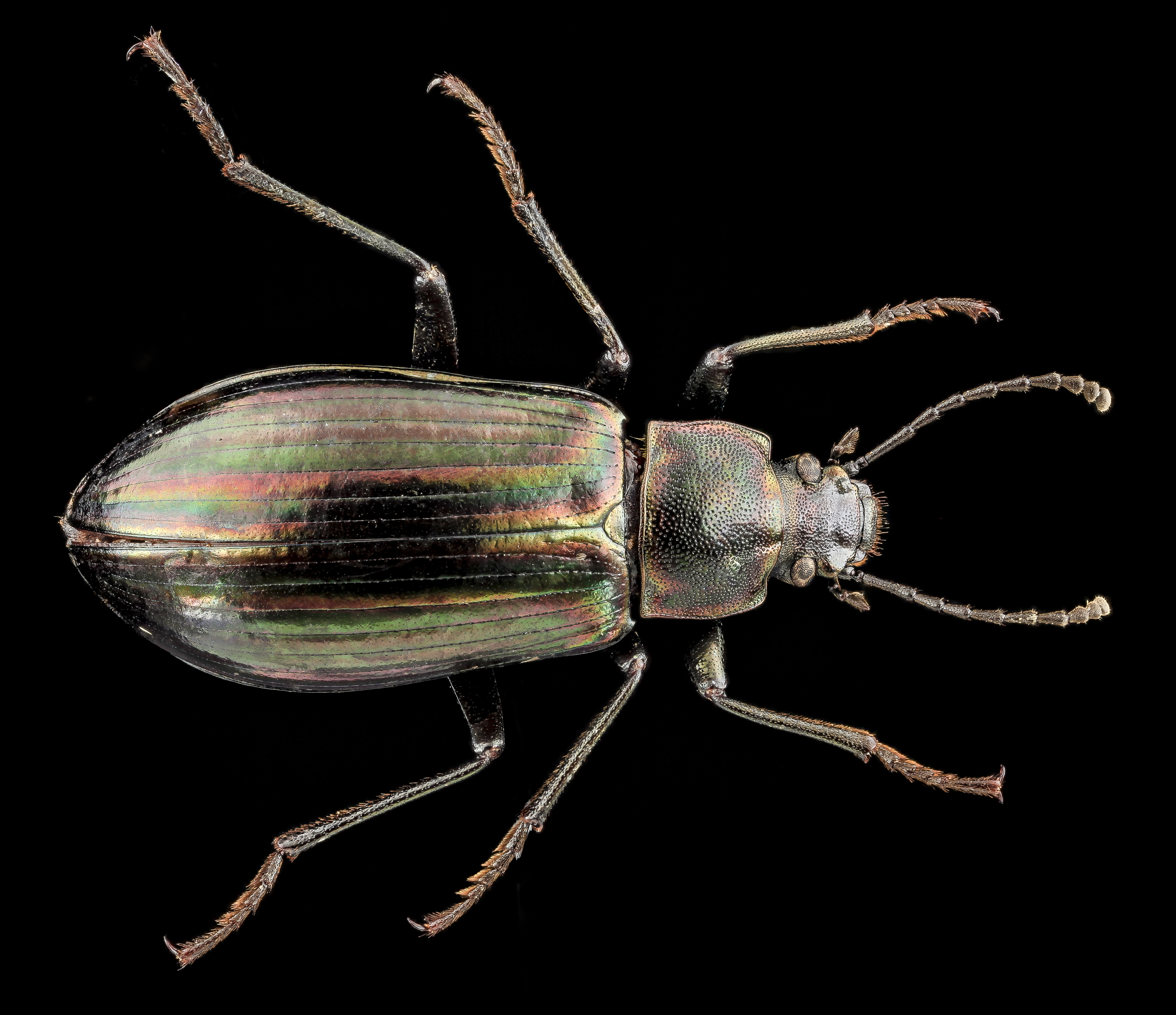
Tarpela micans

== Genera ==
These genera belong to the tribe Helopini:

- Accanthopus Dejean, 1821 (the Palearctic)
- Adelphinus Fairmaire & Coquerel, 1866 (the Palearctic)
- Allardius Ragusa, 1898 (the Palearctic)
- Apterotarpela Kaszab, 1954 (Indomalaya)
- Armenohelops Nabozhenko, 2002 (the Palearctic)
- Asialassus Nabozhenko & Ando, 2018 (the Palearctic and Indomalaya)
- Catomus Allard, 1876 (the Palearctic)
- Ceratopelius Antoine, 1963 (the Palearctic)
- Cylindrinotus Faldermann, 1837 (the Palearctic)
- Deretus Gahan, 1900 (tropical Africa)
- Dolphus Blanchard, 1847 (the Neotropics)
- Ectromopsis Antoine, 1949 (the Palearctic)
- Entomogonus Solier, 1848 (the Palearctic)
- Erionura Reitter, 1903 (the Palearctic)
- Erulipothydemus Pic, 1918 (Indomalaya)
- Euboeus Boieldieu, 1865 (the Palearctic)
- Eustenomacidius Nabozhenko, 2006 (the Palearctic)
- Gunarus Gozis, 1886 (the Palearctic)
- Hedyphanes Fischer von Waldheim, 1820 (the Palearctic)
- Helopidesthes Fairmaire, 1895 (tropical Africa)
- Helops Fabricius, 1775 (North America, the Neotropics, and the Palearctic)
- Idahelops Keskin & Nabozhenko, 2012 (the Palearctic)
- Italohelops Español, 1961 (the Palearctic)
- Mamorina Antoine, 1951 (the Palearctic)
- Microcatomus Pic, 1925 (tropical Africa)
- Microdocnemis Nabozhenko & Keskin, 2010 (the Palearctic)
- Nalassus Mulsant, 1854 (North America, the Palearctic, and Indomalaya)
- Nautes Pascoe, 1866 (North America and the Neotropics)
- Neohelops Dajoz, 2001 (North America)
- Nephodinus Gebien, 1943 (the Palearctic)
- Nesotes Allard, 1876 (the Palearctic)
- Nipponohelops Masumoto, Ando & Akita, 2006 (the Palearctic)
- Odocnemis Allard, 1876 (the Palearctic)
- Physohelops Schuster, 1937 (the Palearctic)
- Pseudoprobaticus Nabozhenko, 2001 (the Palearctic)
- Raiboscelis Allard, 1876 (the Palearctic)
- Reitterohelops Skopin, 1960 (the Palearctic)
- Sabularius Escalera, 1914 (the Palearctic)
- Socotraphanes Nabozhenko, 2019 (tropical Africa)
- Stenohelops Reitter, 1922 (the Palearctic)
- Stenomax Allard, 1876 (the Palearctic)
- Stygohelops Leo & Liberto, 2003 (the Palearctic)
- Tarpela Bates, 1870 (North America and the Neotropics)
- Taurohelops Keskin & Nabozhenko, 2015 (the Palearctic)
- Turkmenohelops G.S. Medvedev, 1987 (the Palearctic)
- Turkonalassus Keskin, Nabozhenko & Alpagut-Keskin, 2017 (the Palearctic)
- Xanthohelops Nabozhenko, 2006 (the Palearctic)
- Xanthomus Mulsant, 1854 (the Palearctic)
- Zophohelops Reitter, 1902 (the Palearctic)
- † Cryptohelops Nabozhenko & Kirejtshuk, 2014
