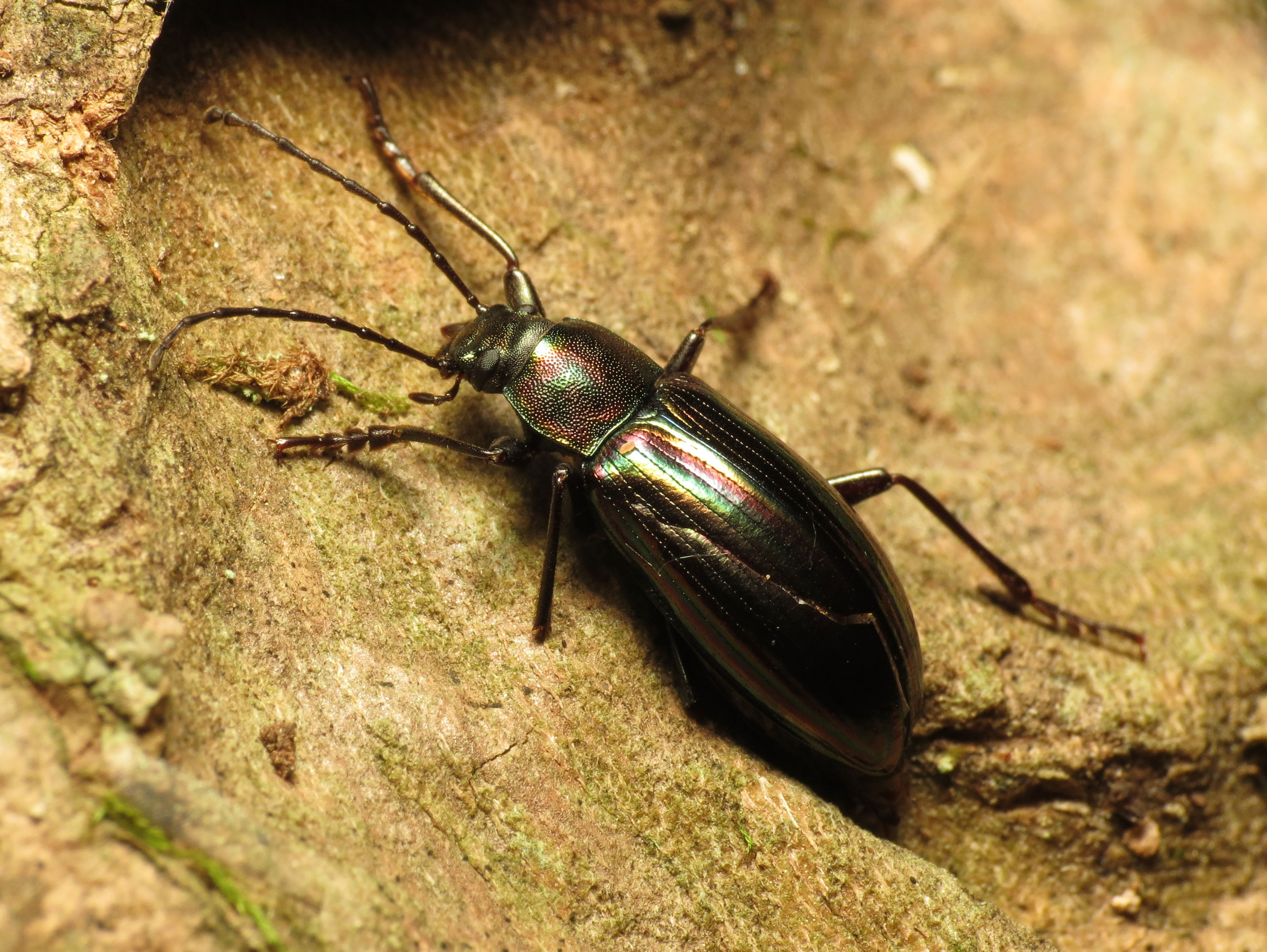

Scientific classification
- Kingdom: Animalia
- Phylum: Arthropoda
- Class: Insecta
- Order: Coleoptera
- Suborder: Polyphaga
- Infraorder: Cucujiformia
- Family: Tenebrionidae
- Genus: Tarpela
- Species: T. micans

Binomial name
- Tarpela micans (Fabricius, 1798)

= Tarpela micans =

Species of beetle

Tarpela micans is a species of darkling beetle in the family Tenebrionidae.

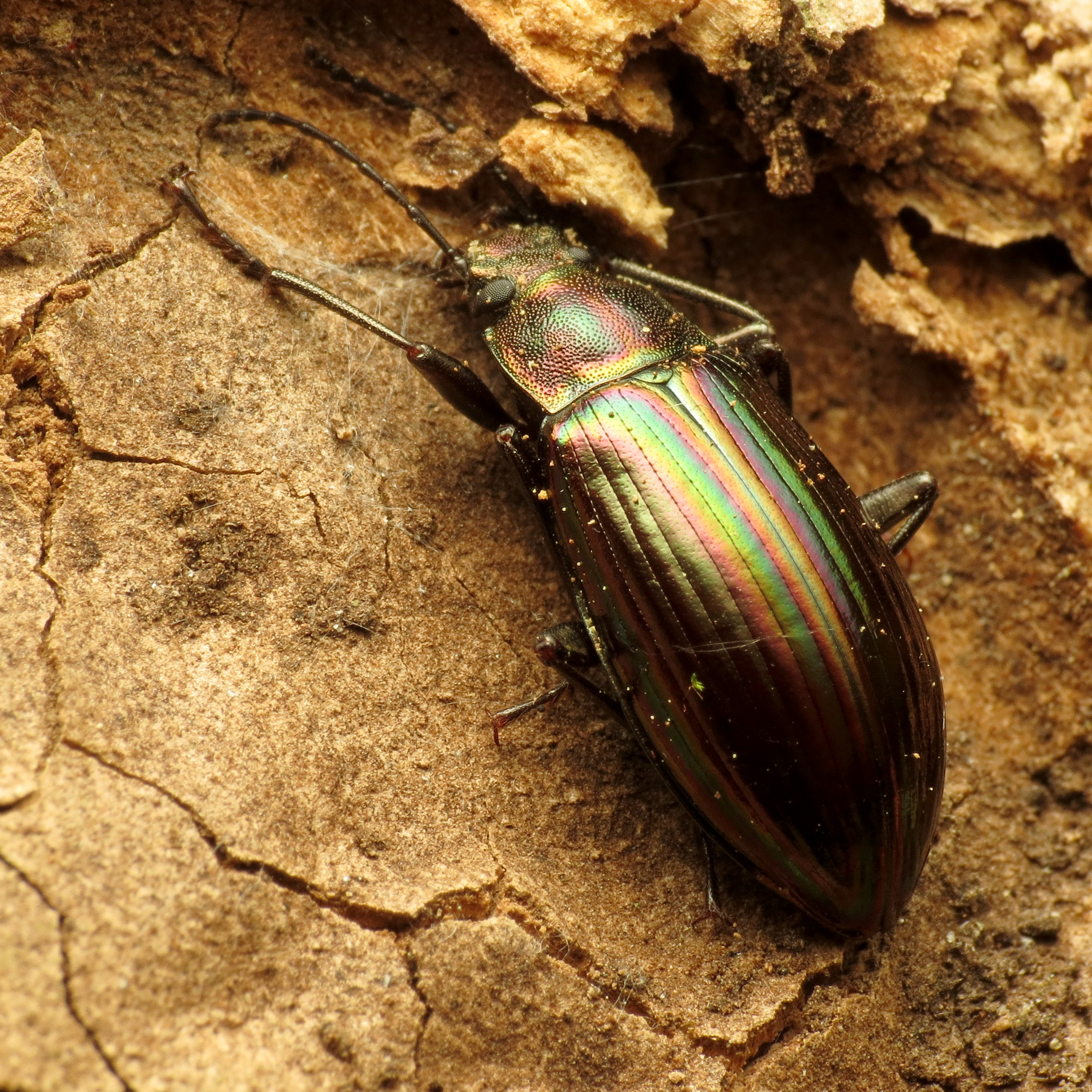

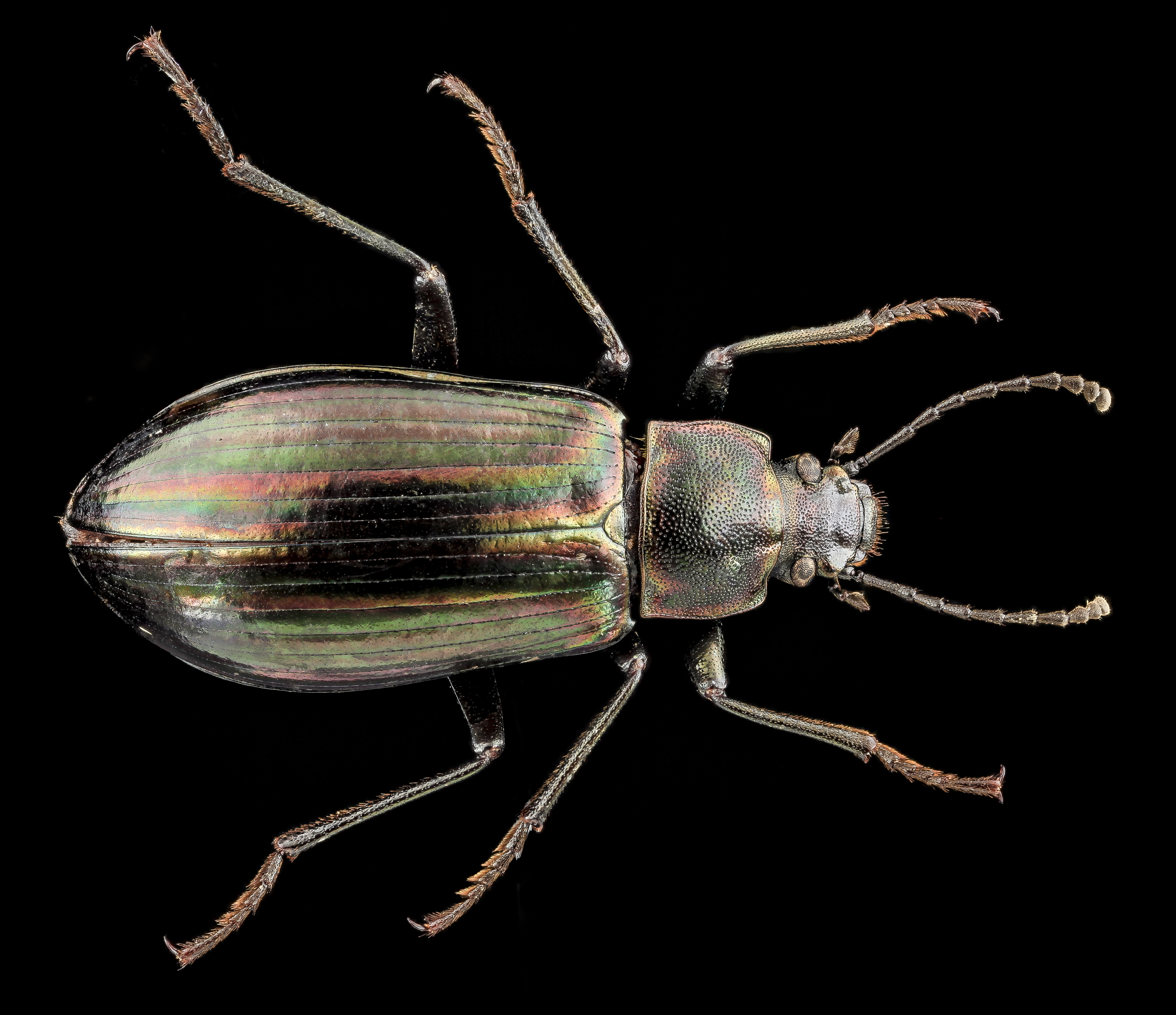
