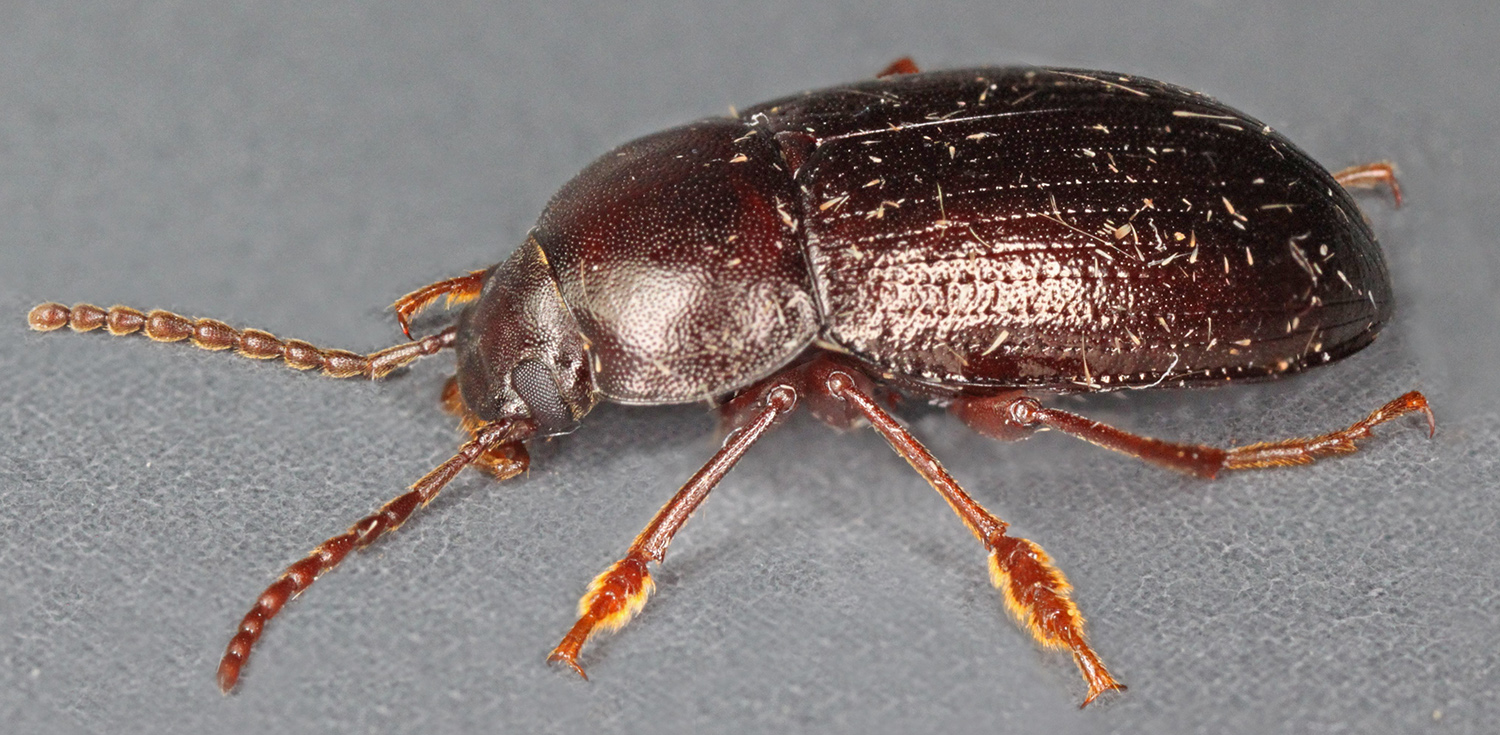
- Nalassus laevioctostriatus from Wales, photographed in 2010

Scientific classification
- Kingdom: Animalia
- Phylum: Arthropoda
- Clade: Pancrustacea
- Class: Insecta
- Order: Coleoptera
- Suborder: Polyphaga
- Infraorder: Cucujiformia
- Family: Tenebrionidae
- Genus: Nalassus
- Species: N. laevioctostriatus

Binomial name
- Nalassus laevioctostriatus (Goeze, 1777)

= Nalassus laevioctostriatus =

Species of beetle

Nalassus laevioctostriatus is a species of beetle from the Darkling beetle family (Tenebrionidae).

The species was described by Johann August Ephraim Goeze in 1777. It is a saproxylic species, with both adults and larvae feeding in dead wood. They also feed on wood affected by fungi and fungi itself. Adults occasionally feed on pollen and nectar. Nalassus laevioctostriatus measures between 7 and 12 mm.

In the United Kingdom it is called the common darkling beetle.
