= Mycopathologia =

- Discipline: Mycology
- Language: English
- Edited by: Vishnu Chaturvedi

Publication details
- Former name(s): Mycopathologia & Mycologia Applicata
- History: 1938–present
- Publisher: Springer Link
- Frequency: Irregular
- Impact factor: 3.785 (2021)

Standard abbreviations
- ISO 4: Mycopathologia

Indexing
- CODEN: MYCPAH
- ISSN: 0301-486X (print); 1573-0832 (web)
- LCCN: 76645223
- OCLC no.: 299333921

Links
- Journal homepage; Online archive

Mycopathologia is a peer-reviewed scientific journal that covers the role of fungi in human and animal disease, i.e., medical and veterinary mycology. The journal was established in 1938 and is currently published by Springer Link. The current editor-in-chief is Vishnu Chaturvedi (California Department of Public Health / University of California, Berkeley).

== History ==
The journal was initially established by Wilhelm Junk in The Hague as Mycopathologia (ISSN 0369-299X) in 1938. Then in 1950, it continued publication under the name Mycopathologia & Mycologia Applicata (ISSN 0027-5530), before returning to Mycopathologia (ISSN 0301-486X) in 1975. From 1959 to 1984, a supplement Iconographia Mycologica (ISSN 0073-4411) was published alongside it.

== Abstracting and indexing ==
Mycopathologia is abstracted and indexed in the following databases:

- Academic OneFile
- AGRICOLA
- Biosis
- CAB International
- Chemical Abstracts Service
- EMBASE
- MEDLINE
- Science Citation Index
- Scopus
