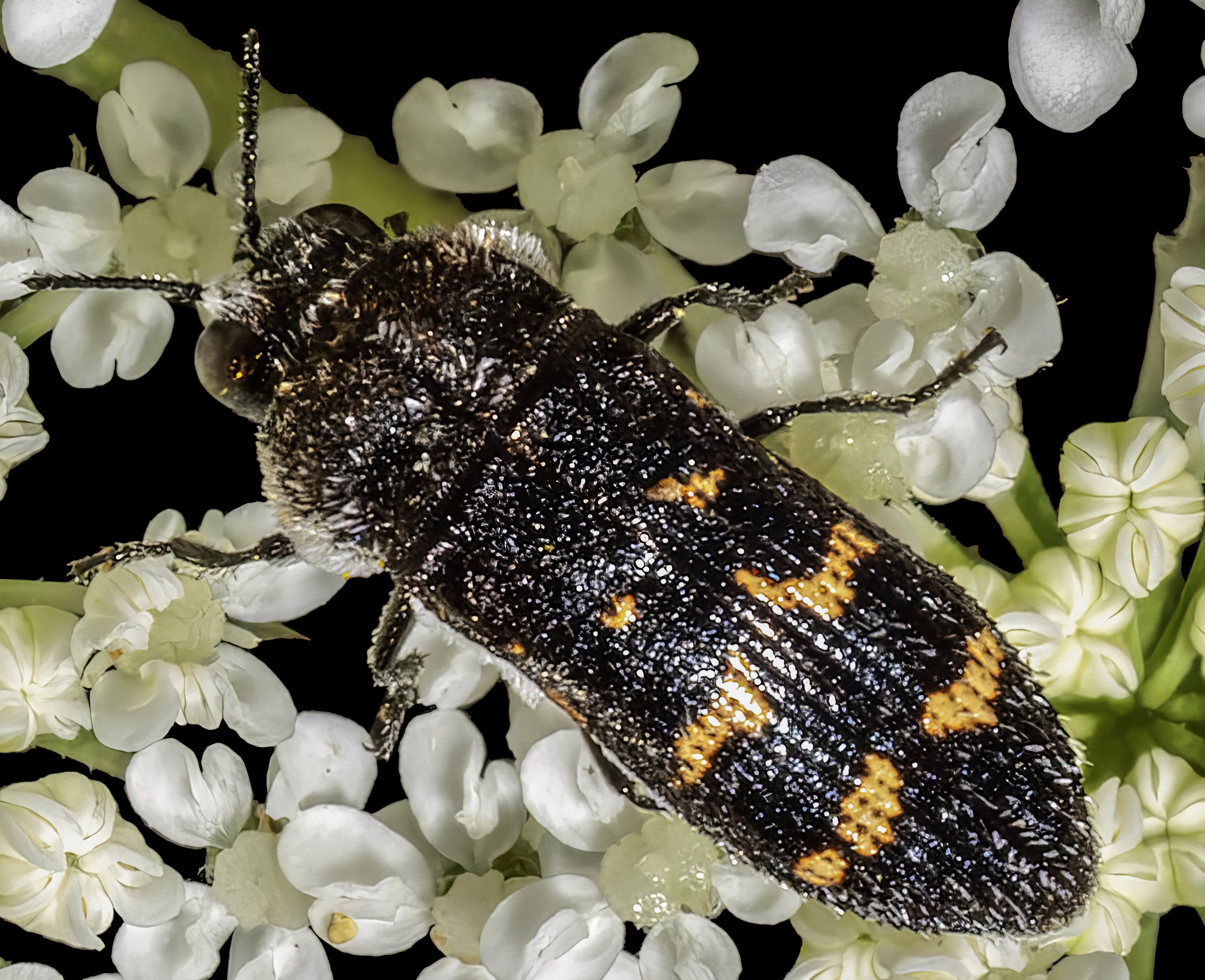
- Acmaeoderella flavofasciata

Scientific classification
- Kingdom: Animalia
- Phylum: Arthropoda
- Clade: Pancrustacea
- Class: Insecta
- Order: Coleoptera
- Suborder: Polyphaga
- Infraorder: Elateriformia
- Family: Buprestidae
- Genus: Acmaeoderella; Cobos, 1955

= Acmaeoderella =

Genus of beetles

Acmaeoderella is a genus of beetles in the family Buprestidae, containing the following species:

- Acmaeoderella adamantina (Reitter, 1890)
- Acmaeoderella adspersula (Illiger, 1803)
- Acmaeoderella alepidota Volkovitsh, 1977
- Acmaeoderella alesi (Obenberger, 1936)
- Acmaeoderella alfierii Théry, 1929
- Acmaeoderella andresi (Théry, 1929)
- Acmaeoderella angorana (Obenberger, 1940)
- Acmaeoderella antoinei (Baudon, 1956)
- Acmaeoderella arabica Cobos, 1963
- Acmaeoderella ballioni (Ganglbauer, 1888)
- Acmaeoderella bolivari (Obenberger, 1934)
- Acmaeoderella brandli Volkovitsh, 1981
- Acmaeoderella candens Volkovitsh, 1977
- Acmaeoderella canescens (Semenov, 1895)
- Acmaeoderella carolusi Volkovitsh, 1989
- Acmaeoderella caspica (Ganglbauer, 1888)
- Acmaeoderella cerastes (Abeille de Perrin, 1900)
- Acmaeoderella chobauti (Théry, 1930)
- Acmaeoderella christophi (Obenberger, 1935)
- Acmaeoderella chrysanthemi (Chevrolat, 1854)
- Acmaeoderella chusistanica (Obenberger, 1934)
- Acmaeoderella cinerea Volkovitsh, 1982
- Acmaeoderella circassica (Reitter, 1890)
- Acmaeoderella coarctata (Lucas, 1846)
- Acmaeoderella coelestina Volkovitsh, 1977
- Acmaeoderella confusissima Cobos, 1966
- Acmaeoderella corsica (Obenberger, 1922)
- Acmaeoderella crucifera (Abeille de Perrin, 1904)
- Acmaeoderella cyanipennis (Lucas, 1846)
- Acmaeoderella cypriota (Obenberger), 940a)
- Acmaeoderella densisquamis (Abeille de Perrin, 1904)
- Acmaeoderella despecta (Baudi di Selve, 1870)
- Acmaeoderella dilatisquamis (Obenberger, 1928)
- Acmaeoderella discoida (Fabricius, 1787)
- Acmaeoderella dlabolai Bílý, 1983
- Acmaeoderella dsungarica (Obenberger, 1918)
- Acmaeoderella dubia (Ballion, 1871)
- Acmaeoderella elbursi (Obenberger, 1924)
- Acmaeoderella elegans (Harold, 1869)
- Acmaeoderella farinosa (Reiche & Saulcy, 1856)
- Acmaeoderella filiformis (Reitter, 1904)
- Acmaeoderella flavofasciata (Piller & Mitterpacher, 1783)
- Acmaeoderella fossulicollis (Escalera, 1914)
- Acmaeoderella fulvinaeva (Reitter, 1890)
- Acmaeoderella gianassoi Curletti & Magnani, 1988
- Acmaeoderella gibbulosa (Ménétriés, 1832)
- Acmaeoderella glasunovi (Semenov, 1895)
- Acmaeoderella hamadanica Volkovitsh, 1983
- Acmaeoderella henoni (Abeille de Perrin, 1893)
- Acmaeoderella holocyanea Volkovitsh, 2006
- Acmaeoderella impunctata (Abeille de Perrin, 1891)
- Acmaeoderella inamoena (Faldermann, 1835)
- Acmaeoderella insueta Volkovitsh, 1977
- Acmaeoderella iranica (Obenberger, 1934)
- Acmaeoderella jezeki Bílý, 1983
- Acmaeoderella jonica (Obenberger, 1934)
- Acmaeoderella judaeorum (Obenberger, 1914)
- Acmaeoderella kubani Volkovitsh, 1987
- Acmaeoderella lanuginosa (Gyllenhal, 1817)
- Acmaeoderella leucotricha (Obenberger, 1940)
- Acmaeoderella levantina (Obenberger, 1934)
- Acmaeoderella longissima (Abeille de Perrin, 1904)
- Acmaeoderella maculipennis (Pic, 1897)
- Acmaeoderella marcaisi (Descarpentries & Mateu, 1967)
- Acmaeoderella mauritanica (Lucas, 1844)
- Acmaeoderella medvedevi Volkovitsh, 2006
- Acmaeoderella mimonti (Boieldieu, 1865)
- Acmaeoderella mongolorum Volkovitsh in Alexeev & Volkovitsh, 1989
- Acmaeoderella moroderi (Reitter, 1906)
- Acmaeoderella muehlei Volkovitsh, 1989
- Acmaeoderella nannorrhopsicola Volkovitsh & Bílý, 1979
- Acmaeoderella nigrentis Volkovitsh, 1979
- Acmaeoderella nivetecta Volkovitsh, 1976
- Acmaeoderella nivifera (Abeille de Perrin, 1894)
- Acmaeoderella normanna Sparacio, 2006
- Acmaeoderella oblonga Volkovitsh, 1977
- Acmaeoderella obscura (Reitter, 1889)
- Acmaeoderella olivacea (Abeille de Perrin, 1904)
- Acmaeoderella opacicollis (Abeille de Perrin, 1900)
- Acmaeoderella oresitropha (Obenberger, 1924)
- Acmaeoderella paradoxa (Escalera, 1914)
- Acmaeoderella pellitula (Reitter, 1890)
- Acmaeoderella perroti (Schaefer, 1950)
- Acmaeoderella personata (Semenov, 1896)
- Acmaeoderella pharao (Obenberger, 1923)
- Acmaeoderella piciella (Obenberger, 1926)
- Acmaeoderella plavilscikovi (Obenberger, 1936)
- Acmaeoderella pseudovirgulata Volkovitsh & Bílý, 1979
- Acmaeoderella refleximargo (Reitter, 1890)
- Acmaeoderella rejzeki (Volkovitsh, 2018)
- Acmaeoderella repetekensis (Obenberger, 1934)
- Acmaeoderella richteri Volkovitsh, 1976
- Acmaeoderella rubroornata (Escalera, 1914)
- Acmaeoderella rufomarginata (Lucas, 1846)
- Acmaeoderella safavii Volkovitsh, 1981
- Acmaeoderella samai Magnani, 1995
- Acmaeoderella samosicola Volkovitsh, 1989
- Acmaeoderella sefrensis (Pic, 1895)
- Acmaeoderella semiviolacea (Semenov, 1895)
- Acmaeoderella serricornis (Abeille de Perrin, 1900)
- Acmaeoderella solskyi (Obenberger, 1934)
- Acmaeoderella squamosa (Théry, 1914)
- Acmaeoderella staudingeri (Abeille de Perrin, 1900)
- Acmaeoderella stepaneki (Obenberger, 1940)
- Acmaeoderella strandi (Obenberger, 1918)
- Acmaeoderella stricta (Abeille de Perrin, 1895)
- Acmaeoderella subcyanea (Reitter, 1890)
- Acmaeoderella syrdarjensis (Obenberger, 1934)
- Acmaeoderella theryana (Abeille de Perrin, 1900)
- Acmaeoderella tragacanthae Volkovitsh, 1987
- Acmaeoderella trifoveolata (Lucas, 1846)
- Acmaeoderella trinacriae (Obenberger, 1923)
- Acmaeoderella troniceki (Obenberger, 1935)
- Acmaeoderella turanica (Reitter, 1890)
- Acmaeoderella valentinae Volkovitsh, 1977
- Acmaeoderella vaulogeri (Abeille de Perrin, 1893)
- Acmaeoderella vayssieresi Cobos, 1984
- Acmaeoderella vazquezi Cobos, 1966
- Acmaeoderella vetusta (Ménétriés, 1832)
- Acmaeoderella villosula (Steven, 1830)
- Acmaeoderella virgulata (Illiger, 1803)
- Acmaeoderella volkovitshi Bílý, 1985
- Acmaeoderella zarudniana Volkovitsh, 1977
- Acmaeoderella zeravshanica Volkovitsh, 1987
- Acmaeoderella zygophylli Curletti & Magnani, 1988
