= János Nagyváthy =

Hungarian pioneer of scientific agriculture (1755–1819)

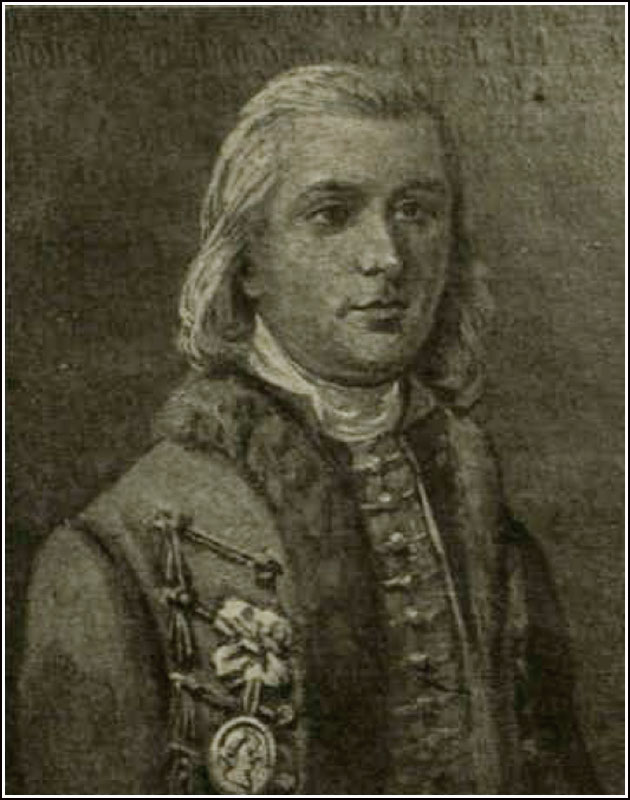

János Nagyváthy (January 19, 1755 – February 13, 1819) was a Hungarian pioneer of scientific agriculture who was best known for his book on agriculture published in 1791 in two volumes as A szorgalmatos mezei gazda ("The Diligent Farmer").

Nagyváthy was born in Miskolc in a family that came from the Baranya county. His grandfather had married in Bratislava and his father Ferenc had moved to Miskolc and become a carpenter. He also converted from Roman Catholic to Lutheranism. In some biographies the family was noted as belonging to minor nobility from the Somogy county. He studied at a Protestant grammar school in Miskolc and studied theology and law in Sárospatak. He then taught in Losonc for some time. He went to Pest for treatment of eye problems and during this period he attended the lectures of Mitterpacher Lajos. In 1782 he joined military service and served in the Duka cavalry regiment which took him around Belgium, Italy, and Austria for the next four years. In 1786 his eye trouble forced him to visit Vienna where he met and became an apprentice on the estate of Peter Jordan (1751–1827), governor of Laxenburg, known for his work in agronomy. He joined the freemasons here. In 1788 he moved to Pest where he met the nobles Széchenyi Ferenc and György Festetics de Tolna (1755–1819) who were also freemasons. It was here that he began to write his book A szorgalmatos mezei gazda ("The Diligent Farmer") which was published in 1791 with 248 subscribers. The book, supported by Széchenyi and others, was aimed at small farmers and aimed to improve their economic condition. It was published in two parts of 584 and 628 pages and costed six silver forints. The second part included information on vineyards, winemaking, forestry, poultry, sheep and goat farming and horse keeping. He made use of the volumes Elementa rei rusticae by Mitterpacher, Johan Beckmann's "Grundsätze der deutschen Landwirtschaft" and several other German works. In 1792 he moved to Keszthely to manage the estate of György Festetics. He helped Festetics establish a high school in Csurgó, Somogy County and also suggested the establishment of an agricultural school. In 1797 Nagyváthy retired and he lived in Csurgó, taking part in the activities of the school. He died of pneumonia in 1819 and he was buried in the park of the high school.
