= Peter Jordan (agronomist) =

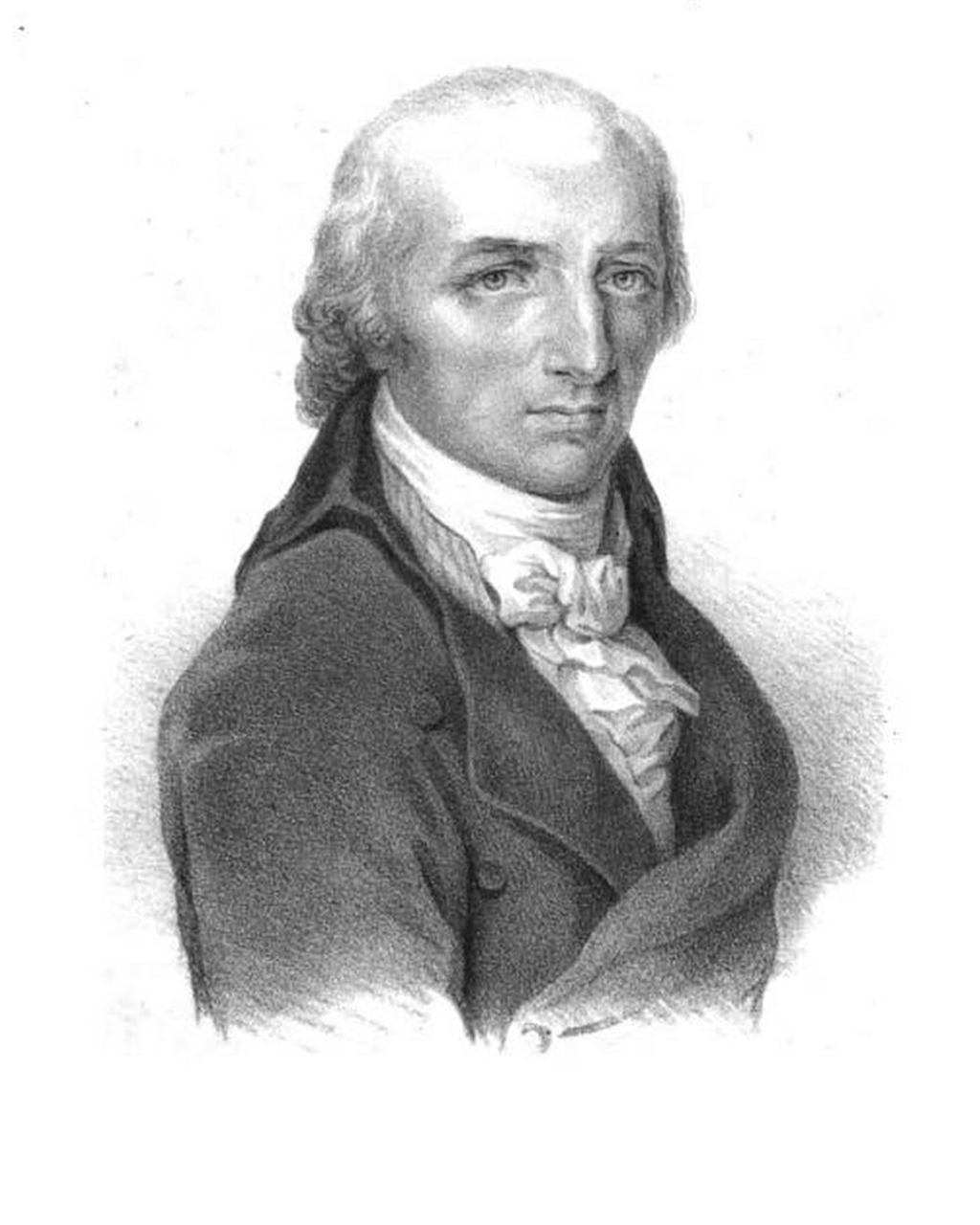

Peter Jordan (2 February 1751 – 6 July 1827) was a professor of natural history and later agronomy at the University of Vienna. Although he did not publish any works, he taught and influenced others who wrote on agriculture.

Jordan was born in Sellrain in Tyrol and grew up in poverty, working as a shepherd. Assistance from a local pastor led to his attending school and he was later able to join the University of Göttingen to study medicine. He attended the lectures of Johann Friedrich Blumenbach and Georg Christoph Lichtenberg. He then moved to Vienna and became an assistant to Andreas Joseph von Stifft. In 1783, he received the chair of natural history at the University of Vienna. In 1796, he began to give lectures on rational agriculture and helped establish the teaching of agriculture. In 1806, Emperor Francis II made him director of the lands of Vösendorf and Laxenburg and put him in charge of agriculture in the region. Here he was more involved in the practical training of students in agricultural practices. He also promoted cattle breeding and influenced agricultural education in the region. His students included the Hungarian János Nagyváthy and Leopold Trautmann (1766–1825) who both published many of his ideas in their works.

Jordan received the Order of Leopold in 1809. In 1904, a street in Vienna was named after him as Peter-Jordan-Straße.
