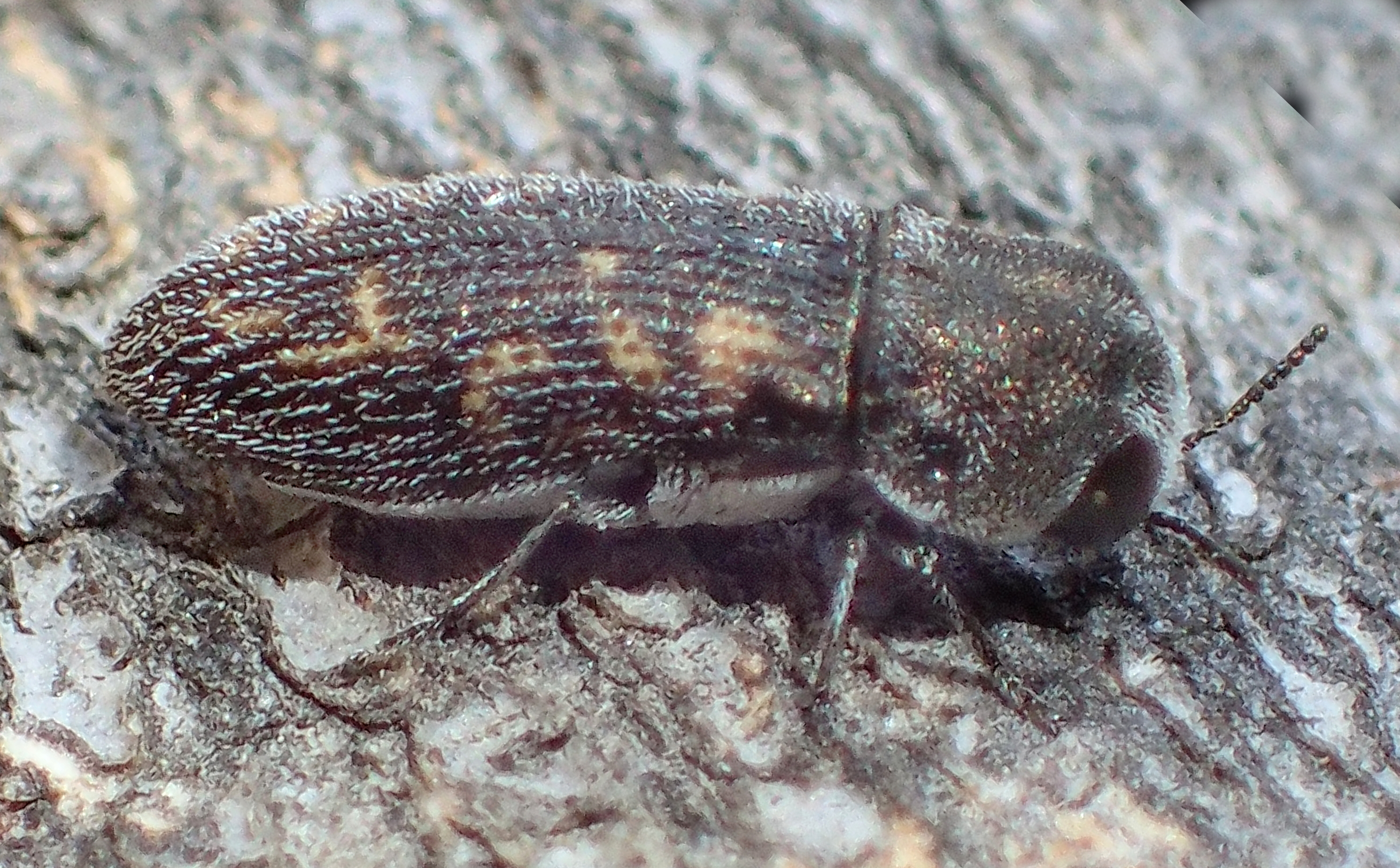

Scientific classification
- Domain: Eukaryota
- Kingdom: Animalia
- Phylum: Arthropoda
- Class: Insecta
- Order: Coleoptera
- Suborder: Polyphaga
- Infraorder: Elateriformia
- Family: Buprestidae
- Genus: Acmaeoderella
- Species: A. adspersula

Binomial name
- Acmaeoderella adspersula (Illiger, 1803)

= Acmaeoderella adspersula =

Species of jewel beetle

Acmaeoderella adspersula is a species of jewel beetle in the Polycestinae subfamily.

== Range ==
Acmaeoderella adspersula occurs in Mediterranean Europe and Africa, ranging from Turkey over the Adriatic coast, France and Spain to Portugal. The species has also been recorded in Algeria and Morocco.

== Taxonomy ==
Acmaeoderella adspersula contains the following subspecies:

- Acmaeoderella adspersula squamiplumis
