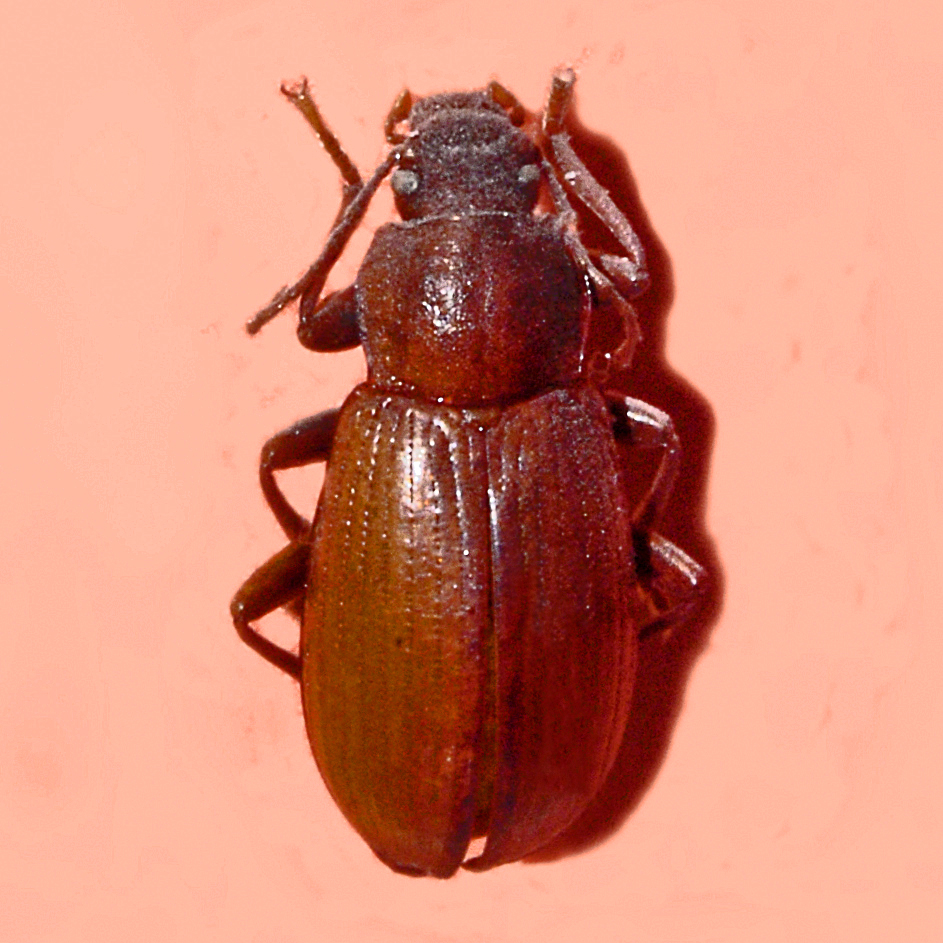
- Museum specimen

Scientific classification
- Domain: Eukaryota
- Kingdom: Animalia
- Phylum: Arthropoda
- Class: Insecta
- Order: Coleoptera
- Suborder: Polyphaga
- Infraorder: Cucujiformia
- Family: Tenebrionidae
- Genus: Stenomax
- Species: S. aeneus

Binomial name
- Stenomax aeneus (Scopoli, 1763)

Synonyms
- Cylindronotus aeneus (Scopoli, 1863); Tenebrio aeneus Scopoli, 1763; Tenebrio lanipes Linnaeus, 1771

= Stenomax aeneus =

Species of beetle

Stenomax aeneus is a species of darkling beetles in the family Tenebrionidae).

== Subspecies ==
- Stenomax aeneus aeneus (Scopoli, 1763)
- Stenomax aeneus incurvus (Küster, 1850)

== Description ==
Stenomax aeneus can reach a length of 12–16 millimetres (0.47–0.63 in). These beetles have a black-brown, elongated body with very long legs. The central pair of legs is hairy at the top. At the end of the abdomen, the elytra form two small spurs.

== Distribution and habitat ==
This quite common species is present in south-eastern and Central Europe (Austria, Czech Republic, Germany, Hungary, Poland, Slovakia and Switzerland). These beetles live on branches infested with fungi and under bark of deciduous trees.
