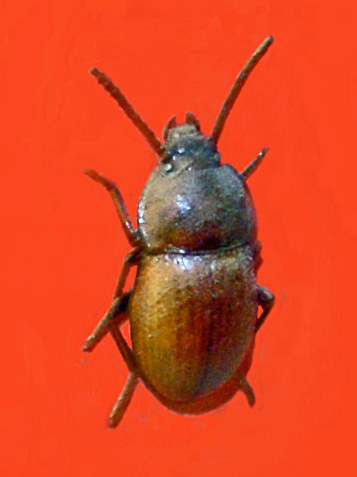
- Nalassus convexus. Museum specimen

Scientific classification
- Domain: Eukaryota
- Kingdom: Animalia
- Phylum: Arthropoda
- Class: Insecta
- Order: Coleoptera
- Suborder: Polyphaga
- Infraorder: Cucujiformia
- Family: Tenebrionidae
- Genus: Nalassus
- Species: N. convexus

Binomial name
- Nalassus convexus (Küster, 1850)

= Nalassus convexus =

Species of beetle

Nalassus convexus is a species of darkling beetles belonging to the subfamily Tenebrioninae.

These beetles can be found in Austria, Germany, Hungary and Switzerland.
