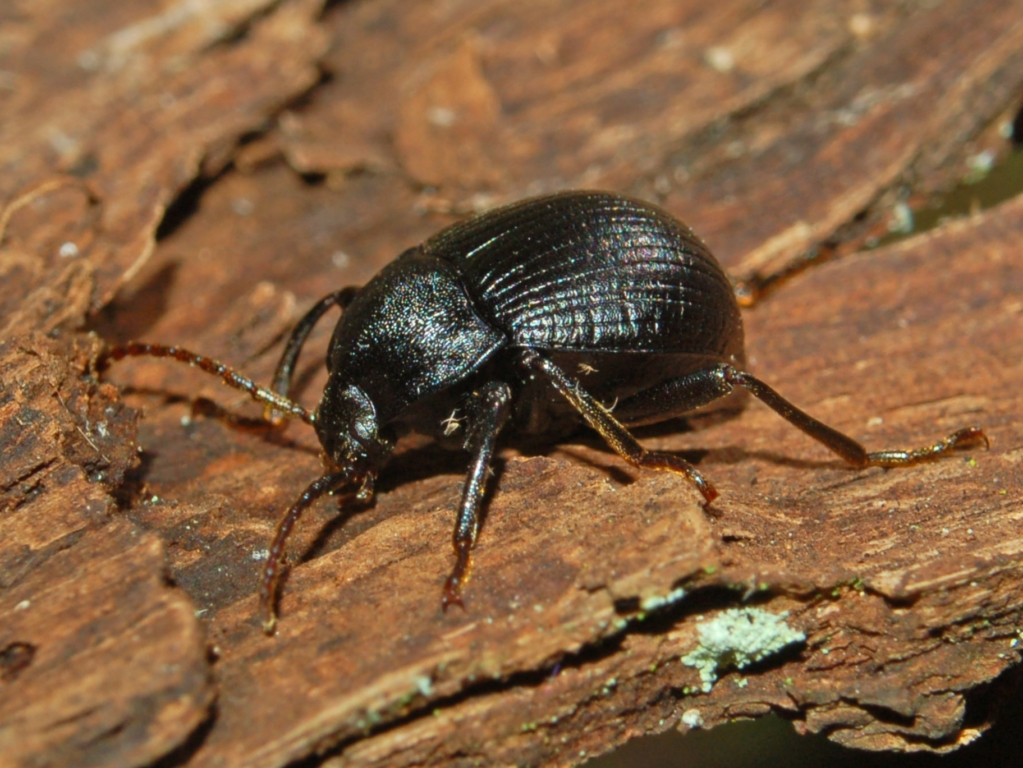
- Accanthopus velikensis

Scientific classification
- Kingdom: Animalia
- Phylum: Arthropoda
- Class: Insecta
- Order: Coleoptera
- Suborder: Polyphaga
- Infraorder: Cucujiformia
- Family: Tenebrionidae
- Genus: Accanthopus; Dejean, 1821

Synonyms
- Acanthopus Latreille, 1829 nec Klug, 1807; Enoplopus Solier, 1848

= Accanthopus =

Genus of beetles

Accanthopus is a genus of darkling beetles belonging to the family Tenebrionidae subfamily Tenebrioninae.

== Species ==
- Accanthopus reitteri (Brenske, 1884)
- Accanthopus velikensis (Piller & Mitterpacher, 1783)
