= Lepidolopha =

Scientific classification
- Kingdom: Plantae
- Clade: Tracheophytes
- Clade: Angiosperms
- Clade: Eudicots
- Clade: Asterids
- Order: Asterales
- Family: Asteraceae
- Subfamily: Asteroideae
- Tribe: Anthemideae
- Genus: Lepidolopha; C.Winkler

Type species
- Lepidolopha komarowii C.Winkler

Genus of flowering plants

Lepidolopha is a genus of flowering plants in the daisy family.

Species

- Lepidolopha fedtschenkoana Knorring
- Lepidolopha gomolitzkii Kovalevsk. & N.A.Safralieva
- Lepidolopha karatavica Pavlov
- Lepidolopha komarowii C.Winkl.
- Lepidolopha krascheninnikovii Czil. ex Kovalevsk. & N.A.Safralieva
- Lepidolopha mogoltavica (Krasch.) Krasch.
- Lepidolopha nuratavica Krasch.
- Lepidolopha talassica Kovalevsk. & N.A.Safralieva
