= Ludwig Mitterpacher =

Hungarian agronomist, botanist, zoologist and entomologist

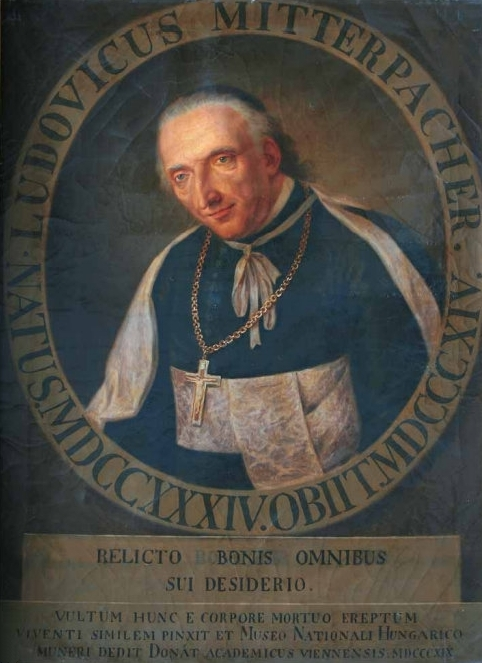

Ludwig (Ljudevit) Mitterpacher von Mitterburg in Hungarian as Mitterpacher Lajos, Latinized as Ludovicus Mitterpacher (25 August 1734, Bilje – 24 May 1814) was a Hungarian agronomist, botanist, zoologist and entomologist.

== Life and work ==
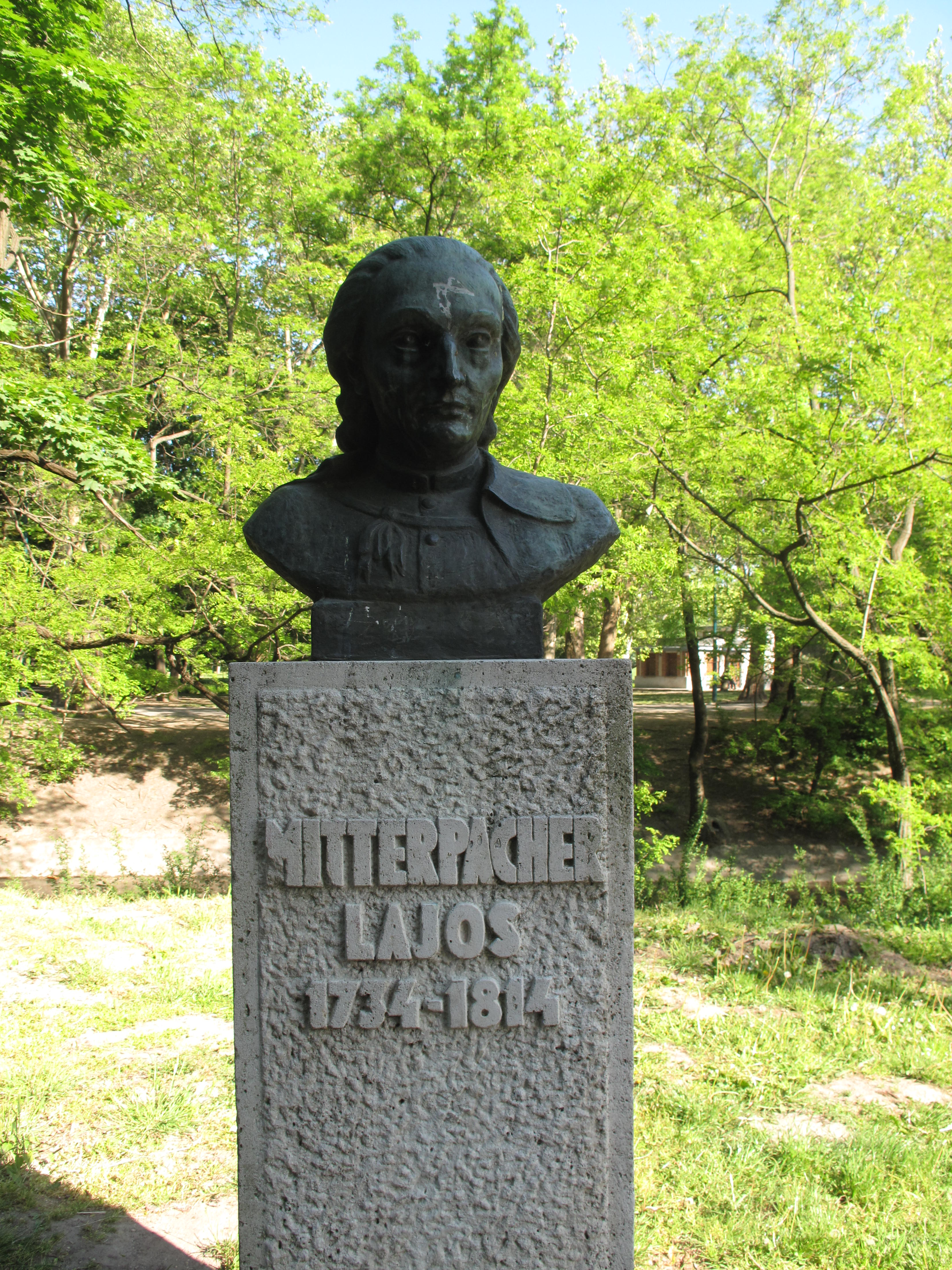
Memorial bust of Mitterpacher

Mitterpacher was born in a German family in Bilje. His brother József later became a professor and clergyman. He went to school in Pécs and joined the Jesuit Order in 1749 at Trencin. He taught Latin at Sopron in 1755 and went to study mathematics at the University of Vienna. From 1758 he taught in Győr and in 1759 he went to Vienna he received a doctorate in theology at the Pázmány Institute and was ordained priest in 1761. He lectured on agriculture at the Jesuit University, the Theresianum in Vienna from 1763 until the dissolution of the order in 1773. The moth Tortrix mitterbacheriana was named after him.

From 1777 Mitterpacher was a professor of natural history in Budapest working with fellow professor Matthias Piller (1733–1788). He wrote Elementa Rei Rusticae in Usum Academiarum Regni Hungariae Budae: Typis Regiae Universitatis, Anno MDCCLXXIX and M. DCC. XCIV( 1779 and 1794), a study of the theory and practice of agricultural science and in 1783 with Matthias Piller Iter per Poseganam Sclavoniaeprovinciam mensibus Junio, et Julio Anno MDCCLXXXII susceptum. Regiae Universitatis, Budapest, a 147-page work with 16 plates in which they described new species of Coleoptera and Lepidoptera. Piller and Mitterpacher explored petroleum reserves in the Pannonian basin in 1781. Nagyváthy János was one of his students.

== Works ==
- Kurzgefasste Naturgeschichte der Erdkugel : zum Behufe der Vorlesungen in der k.k. theresianischen Akademie. 1774
- Anfangsgründe der physikalischen Astronomie. 1776
- Elementa rei rusticae. 1779
- Physikalische Erdbeschreibung. 1789

== Other sources ==
- Horn and Schenkling 1928-1929.Index Litteratuae Entomologicae Horn, Berlin-Dahlem.
