= Sigmund Schenkling =

German entomologist

Sigmund Schenkling (11 July 1865, in Laucha an der Unstrut – 16 December 1946, in Eisleben) was a German entomologist who specialised in Coleoptera.

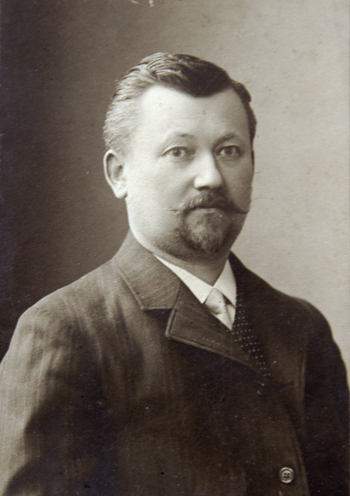
Sigmund Schenkling

Schenkling's collection is held by the German Entomological Institute. It is notable for Cleridae, Erotylidae, Languriidae, Helotidae and Endomychidae the families he specialised in.

== Works ==
Major works only.

- 1928-1929. With Walther Hermann Richard Horn Index Litteratuae Entomologicae Horn, Berlin-Dahlem.A bibliography of entomology, covering the early printed works on entomology through to 1900 and describing over 25,000 printed items.
- As editor the multi-authored and multi-volumed Coleopterorum Catalogus. W. Junk, Berlin.
