= Matthias Piller =

Hungarian Jesuit, naturalist, zoologist, botanist and geologist

Matthias Piller (25 April 1733 – 10 November 1788) was a Hungarian Jesuit, naturalist, zoologist, botanist and geologist. He had a large natural history collection of which the herbaria are now in the Hungarian Natural History Museum and the mineral collections in the Eötvös Loránd University.

Piller was born in Graz and joined the Jesuit order. He was a catechist at the Theresianum in Vienna from 1765 until the dissolution of the order. He then became the founding Professor of Natural history at the University of Budapest where he maintained large collections of zoological, botanical and geological specimens some of which are in the Hungarian Natural History Museum and the Geological Museum of Hungary. The zoological collections were largely destroyed or lost. In 1783 with Ludwig Mitterpacher he wrote Iter per Poseganam Sclavoniaeprovinciam mensibus Junio, et Julio Anno MDCCLXXXII susceptum. Regiae Universitatis published in Budapest.

== Other sources ==
- Horn and Schenkling 1928-1929.Index Litteratuae Entomologicae Horn, Berlin-Dahlem.
