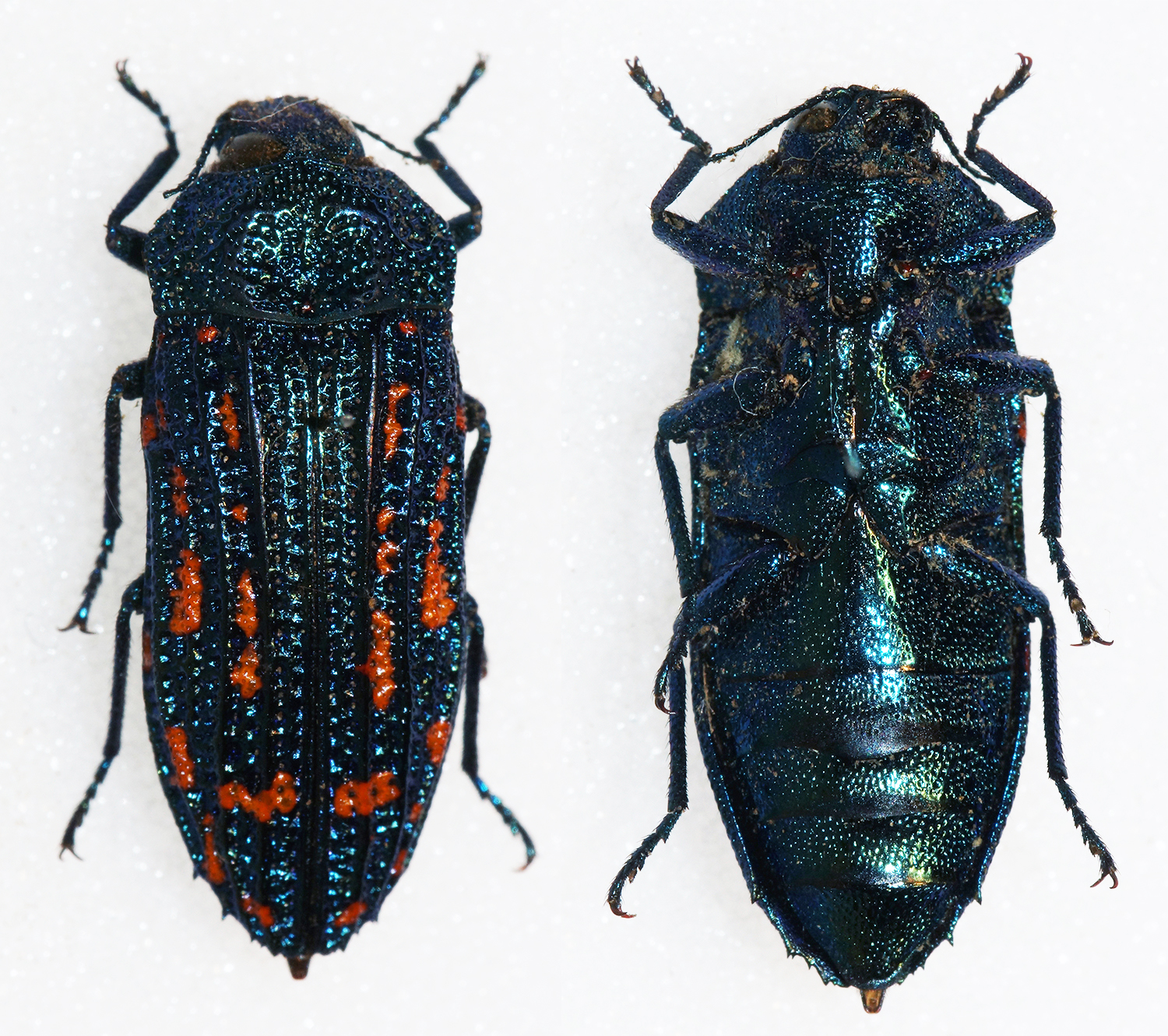
- Polycesta costata (size: 16.5mm)

Scientific classification
- Kingdom: Animalia
- Phylum: Arthropoda
- Clade: Pancrustacea
- Class: Insecta
- Order: Coleoptera
- Suborder: Polyphaga
- Infraorder: Elateriformia
- Family: Buprestidae
- Subfamily: Polycestinae; Lacordaire, 1857

Tribes
- Acmaeoderini Kerremans, 1893; Astraeini Cobos, 1980; Bulini Bellamy, 1995; Haplostethini Leconte, 1861; Paratrachyini Cobos, 1980; Perucolini Cobos, 1980; Polycestini Lacordaire, 1857; Polyctesini Cobos, 1955; Prospherini Cobos, 1980; Ptosimini Kerremans, 1902; Thrincopygini Leconte, 1861; Tyndarini Cobos, 1955; Xyroscelini Cobos, 1955

= Polycestinae =

Subfamily of beetles

Polycestinae is a subfamily of beetles in the family Buprestidae: known as "jewel beetles".

== Tribes and genera ==
The following genera are included:

=== Acmaeoderini ===
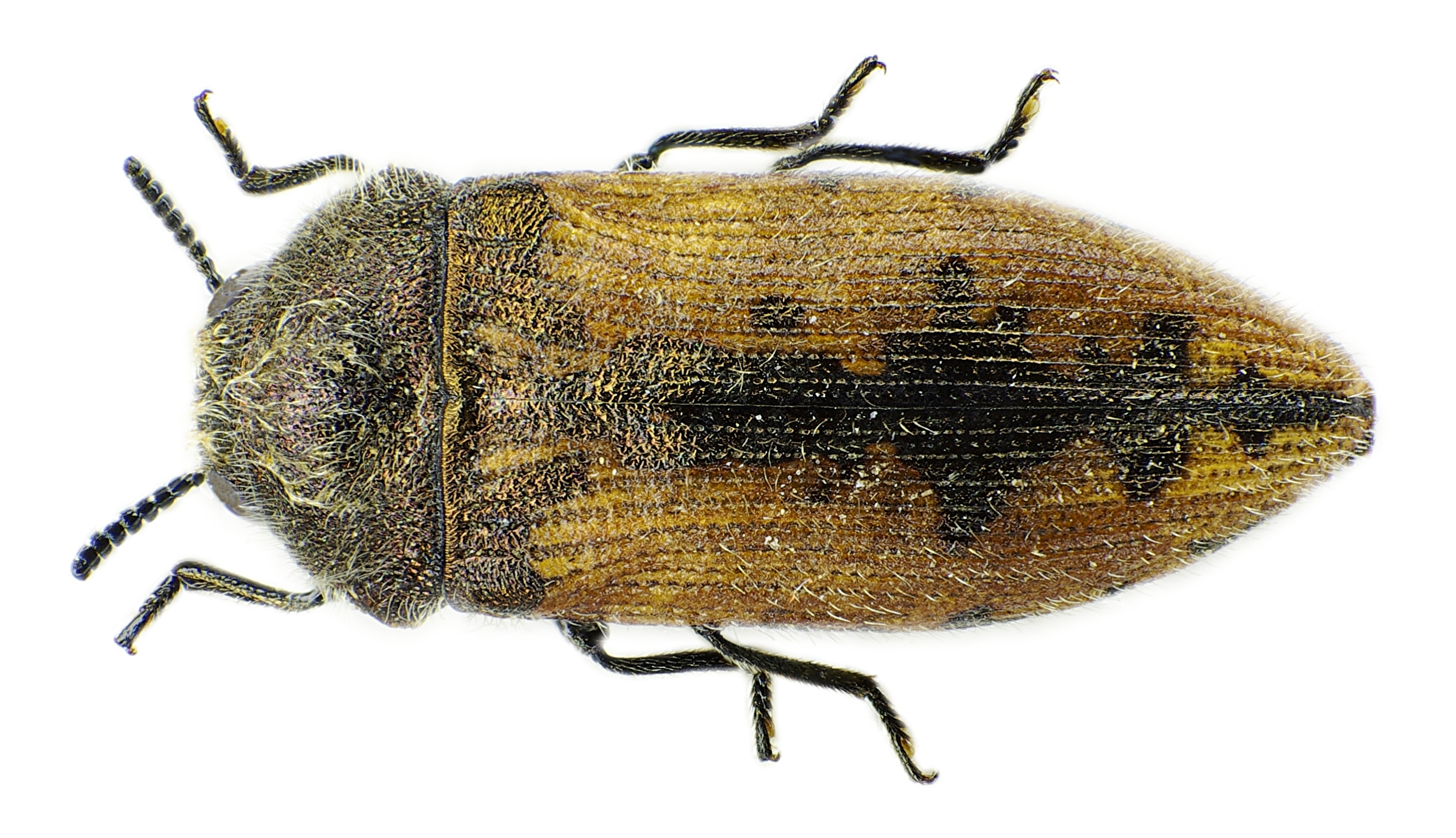
Acmaeodera pilosella (Acmaeoderini)

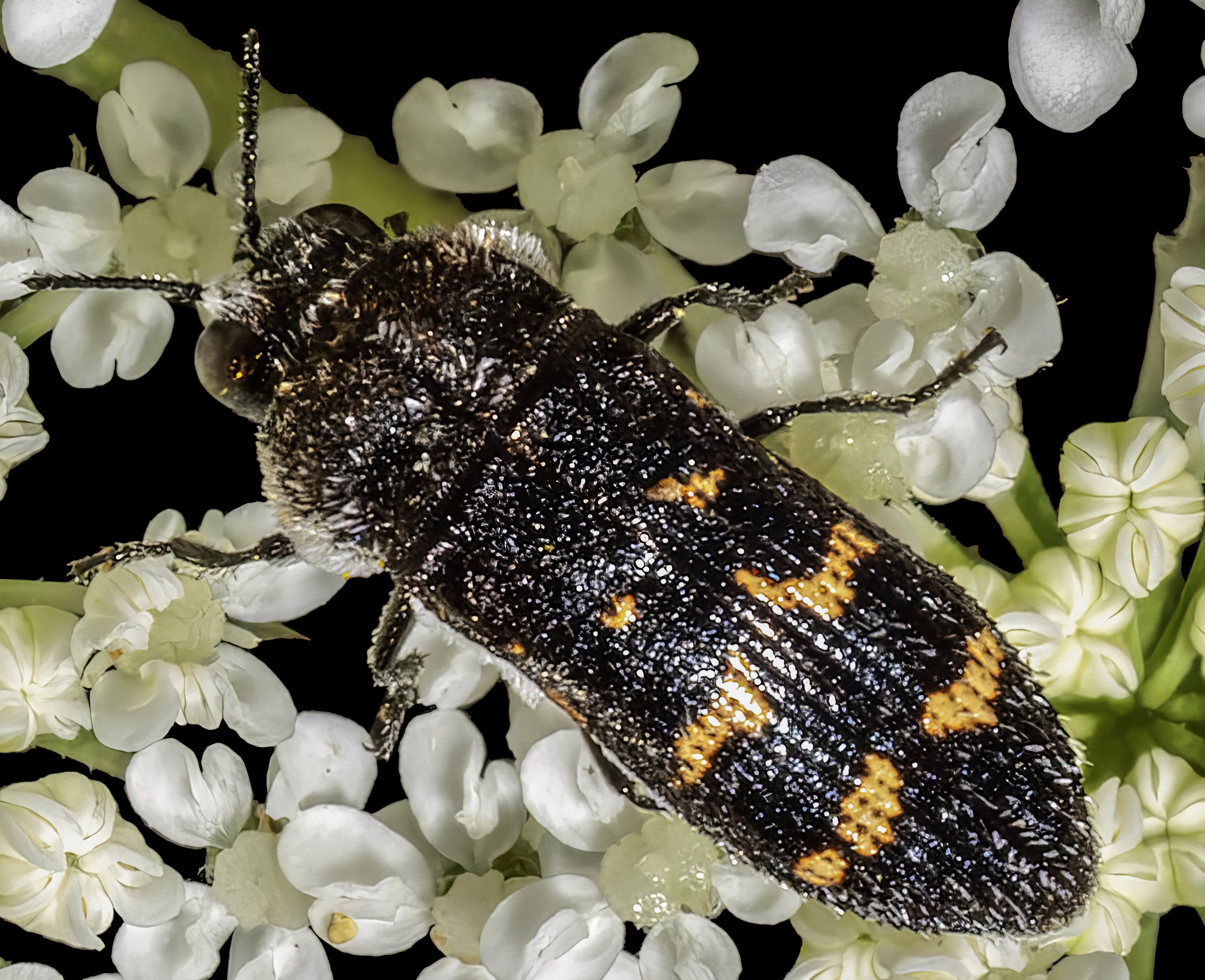
Acmaeoderella flavofasciata (Acmaeoderini)

Authority: Kerremans, 1893

subtribe Acmaeoderina Kerremans, 1893

- Acmaeodera Eschscholtz, 1829
- Acmaeoderella Cobos, 1955
- Acmaeoderoides Van Dyke, 1942
- Acmaeoderopsis Barr, 1974
- Anambodera Barr, 1974
- Atacamita Moore, 1985
- Brachmaeodera Volkovitsh & Bellamy, 1992
- Cochinchinula Volkovitsh, 1984
- Microacmaeodera Cobos, 1966
- Squamodera Nelson, 1996
- Thaichinula Volkovitsh, 2008
- Xantheremia Volkovitsh, 1979

subtribe Odetteina Volkovitsh, 2001

- Odettea Baudon, 1966

subtribe Nothomorphina Cobos, 1955

- Acmaeoderoides Van Dyke, 1942
- Nothomorpha Saunders, 1871
- Nothomorphoides Holm, 1986
- Paracmaeoderoides Bellamy & Westcott, 1996

=== Astraeini ===
Authority: Cobos, 1980

- Astraeus Laporte & Gory, 1837

=== Bulini ===
Authority: Bellamy, 1995; a.k.a. Bulis genus group [tribal level] sensu Volkovitsh, 2001

- Bulis Laporte & Gory, 1837

=== Haplostethini ===
Authority: LeConte, 1861

- Ankareus Kerremans, 1894
- Exaesthetus Waterhouse, 1889
- Helferella Cobos, 1957
- Mastogenius Solier, 1849
- Micrasta Kerremans, 1893
- Namibogenius Bellamy, 1996
- Neomastogenius Toyama, 1983
- Pseudotrigonogya Manley, 1986
- Siamastogenius Toyama, 1983
- Trigonogya Schaeffer, 1919

=== Paratrachyini ===
Authority: Cobos, 1980; Synonyms: Paratrachini, Paratrachydini, Paratrachysae: all Cobos, 1980

- Paratrachys Saunders, 1873
- Sponsor Gory & Laporte, 1839

=== Perucolini ===
Authority: Cobos, 1980

- Perucola Thery, 1925

=== Polycestini ===
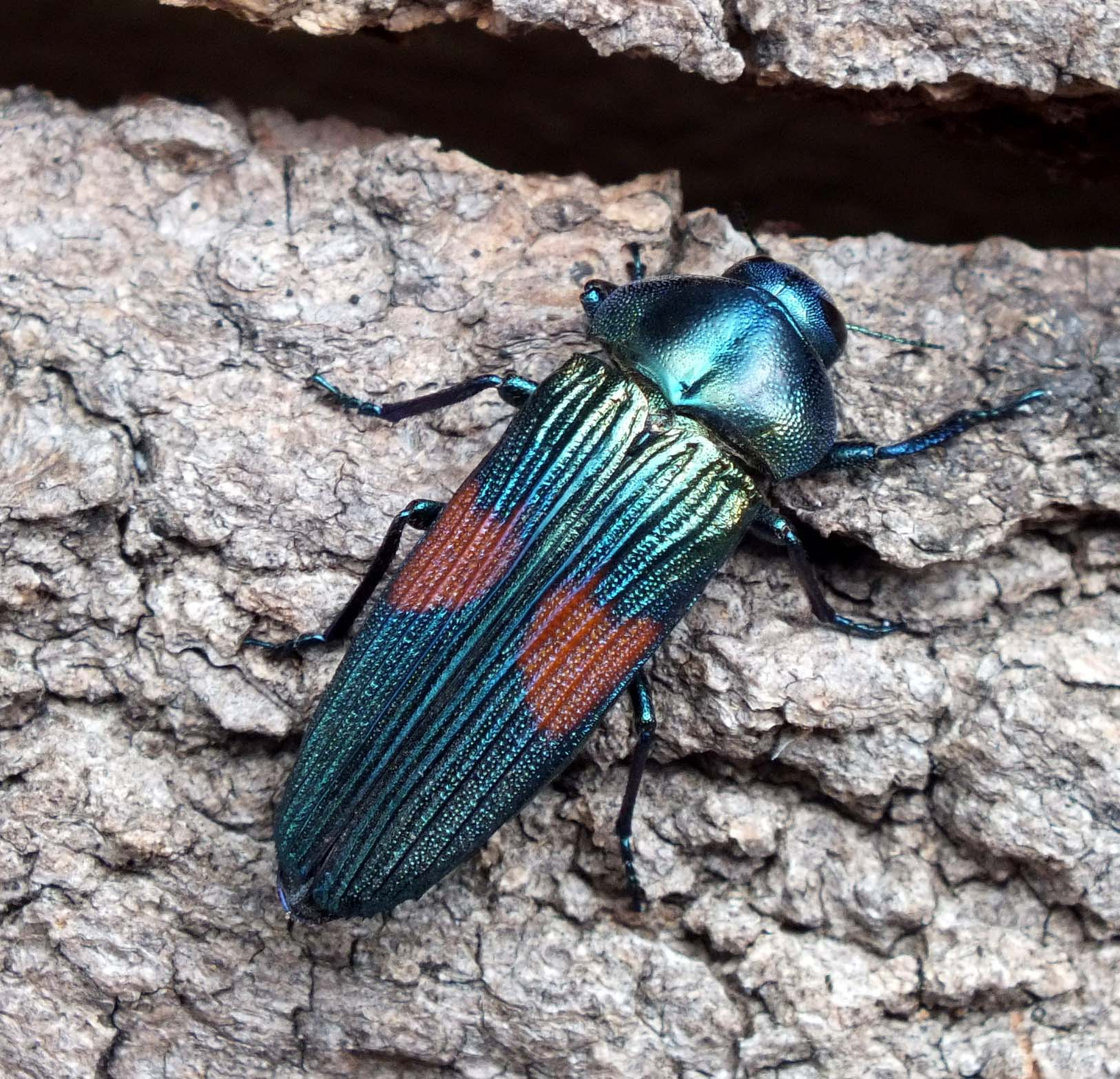
Strigoptera bimaculata

Authority: Lacordaire, 1857

- Agenjosiana Cobos, 1981
- Aldabrica Cobos, 1981
- Bilyesta Bellamy, 1999
- Castaliella Cobos, 1981
- Cobosesta Holm, 1982
- Jelinekia Cobos, 1981
- Kogania Cobos, 1981
- Madecacesta Descarpentries, 1975
- Madecastalia Descaprentries, 1975
- Micropolycesta Cobos, 1981
- Neopolycesta Kerremans, 1906
- Paracastalia Kerremans, 1902
- Paracmaeoderoides Bellamy & Westcott, 1996
- Parapolycesta Cobos, 1981
- Polycesta Dejean, 1833
- Polycestaxia Cobos, 1981
- Polycestaxis Obenberger, 1920
- Polycestella Kerremans, 1902
- Polycestina Cobos, 1981
- Polycestina Cobos, 1981
- Polycestoides Kerremans, 1902
- Pseudocastalia Kraatz, 1896
- Pseudopolycesta Cobos, 1981
- Strigoptera Dejean, 1833
- Strigopteroides Cobos, 1981
- Thurntaxisia Schatzmayr, 1929

subtribe Xenopseina Volkovitsh, 2008

- Kurosawaxia Descarpentries, 1986
- Theryola Nelson, 1997
- Sommaia Toyama, 1985
- Xenopsis Saunders, 1867 (synonym Paraxenopsis Cobos, 1980)

=== Polyctesini ===
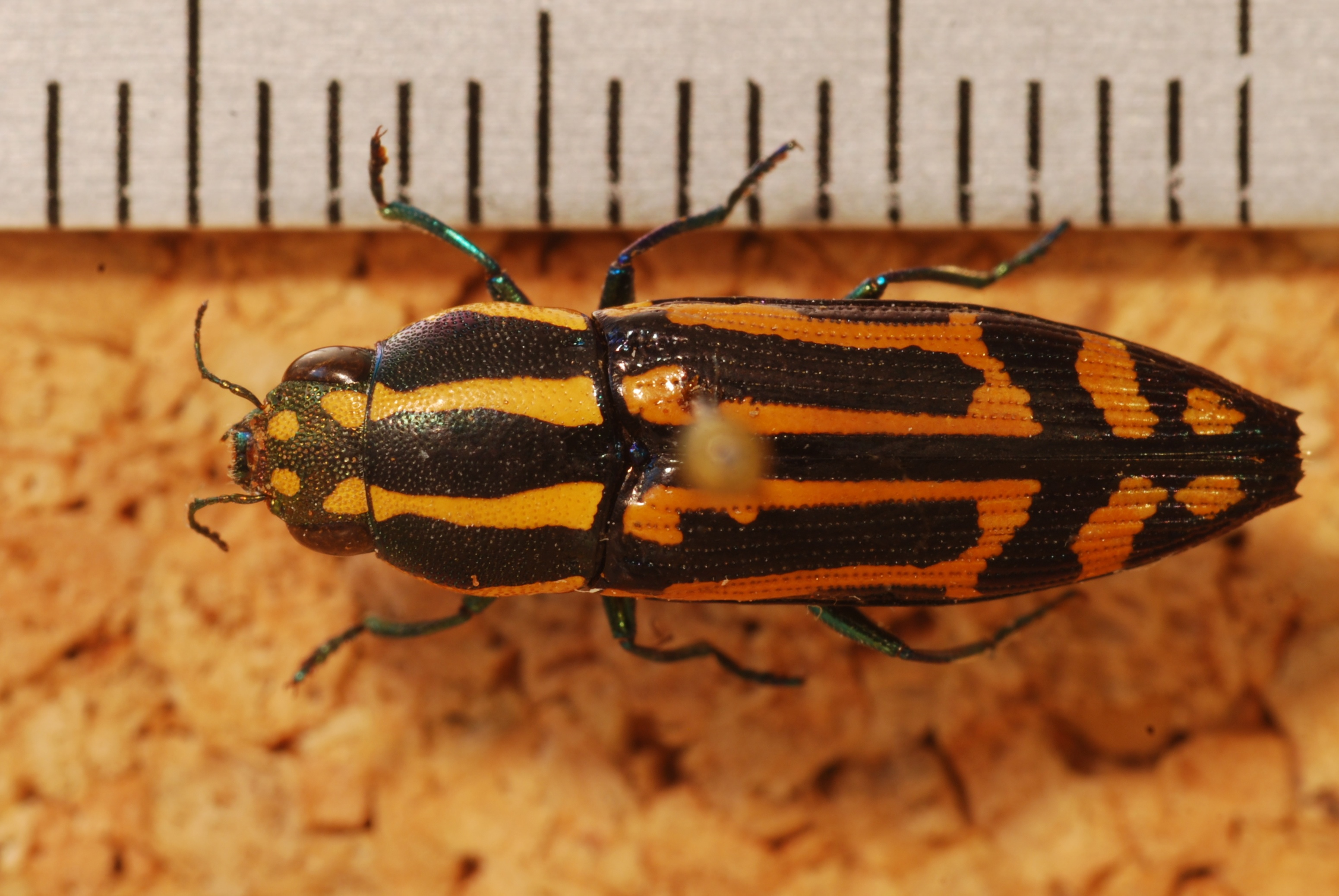
Schoutedeniastes ohkurai (Polyctesini)

Authority: Cobos, 1955

- Bellamyina Bily, 1994
- Polycestis Marseul, 1865
- Schoutedeniastes Burgeon, 1941
- Svatactesis Volkovitsh, 2016

=== Prospherini ===
Authority: Cobos, 1980

- Blepharum Thomson, 1878
- Hiperleptodema Bellamy, 1998
- Prospheres Saunders, 1868

=== Ptosimini ===
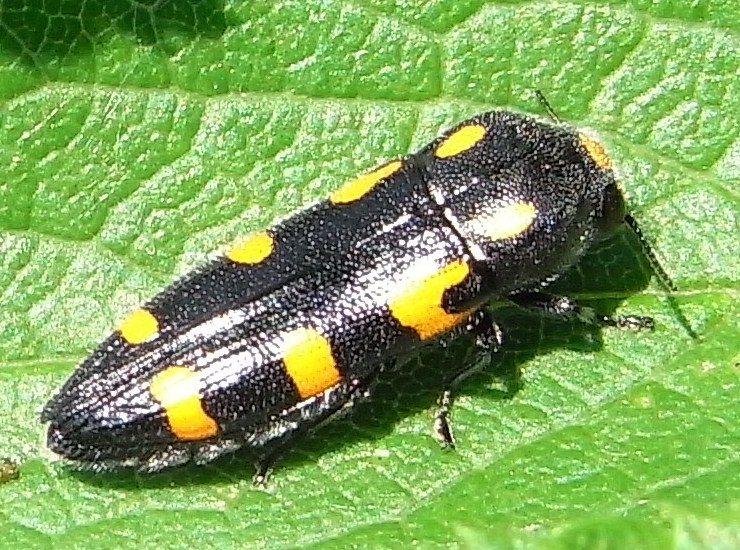
Ptosima undecimpunctata (Ptosimini)

Authority: Kerremans, 1902

- Ptosima Dejean, 1833
- Richtersveldia Bellamy, 2005

=== Thrincopygini ===
Authority: LeConte, 1861

- Beerellus Nelson, 1982
- Chrysophana LeConte, 1860
- Thrincopyge LeConte, 1858

=== Tyndarini ===
Authority: Cobos, 1955

- Ancylotela Waterhouse, 1882
- Neocypetes Cobos, 1973
- Ocypetes Saunders, 1871
- Bordonia Cobos, 1980
- Paraancylotela Cobos, 1959
- Paratyndaris Fisher, 1919
- Pelycothorax Bellamy & Westcott, 1996
- Tyndaris Thomson, 1857
- Hayekina Cobos, 1980
- Mimicoclytrina Bellamy, 2003
- Tyndarimorpha Moore & Dieguez, 2006
- Pseudacherusia Bellamy, 2005

=== Xyroscelini ===
Authority: Cobos, 1955

- Xyroscelis Saunders, 1868
