= Haplostethini =

Scientific classification
- Kingdom: Animalia
- Phylum: Arthropoda
- Class: Insecta
- Order: Coleoptera
- Suborder: Polyphaga
- Infraorder: Elateriformia
- Family: Buprestidae
- Subfamily: Polycestinae
- Tribe: Haplostethini; LeConte, 1861

Tribe of beetles

Haplostethini is a tribe of metallic wood-boring beetles in the family Buprestidae. There are at least 3 genera and more than 60 described species in Haplostethini.

== Genera ==
These genera belong to the tribe Haplostethini:

1. Ankareus Kerremans, 1894
2. Exaesthetus Waterhouse, 1889
3. Helferella Cobos, 1957
4. Mastogenius Solier, 1849
5. Micrasta Kerremans, 1893
6. Namibogenius Bellamy, 1996
7. Neomastogenius Toyama, 1983
8. Pseudotrigonogya Manley, 1986
9. Siamastogenius Toyama, 1983
10. Trigonogya Schaeffer, 1919
