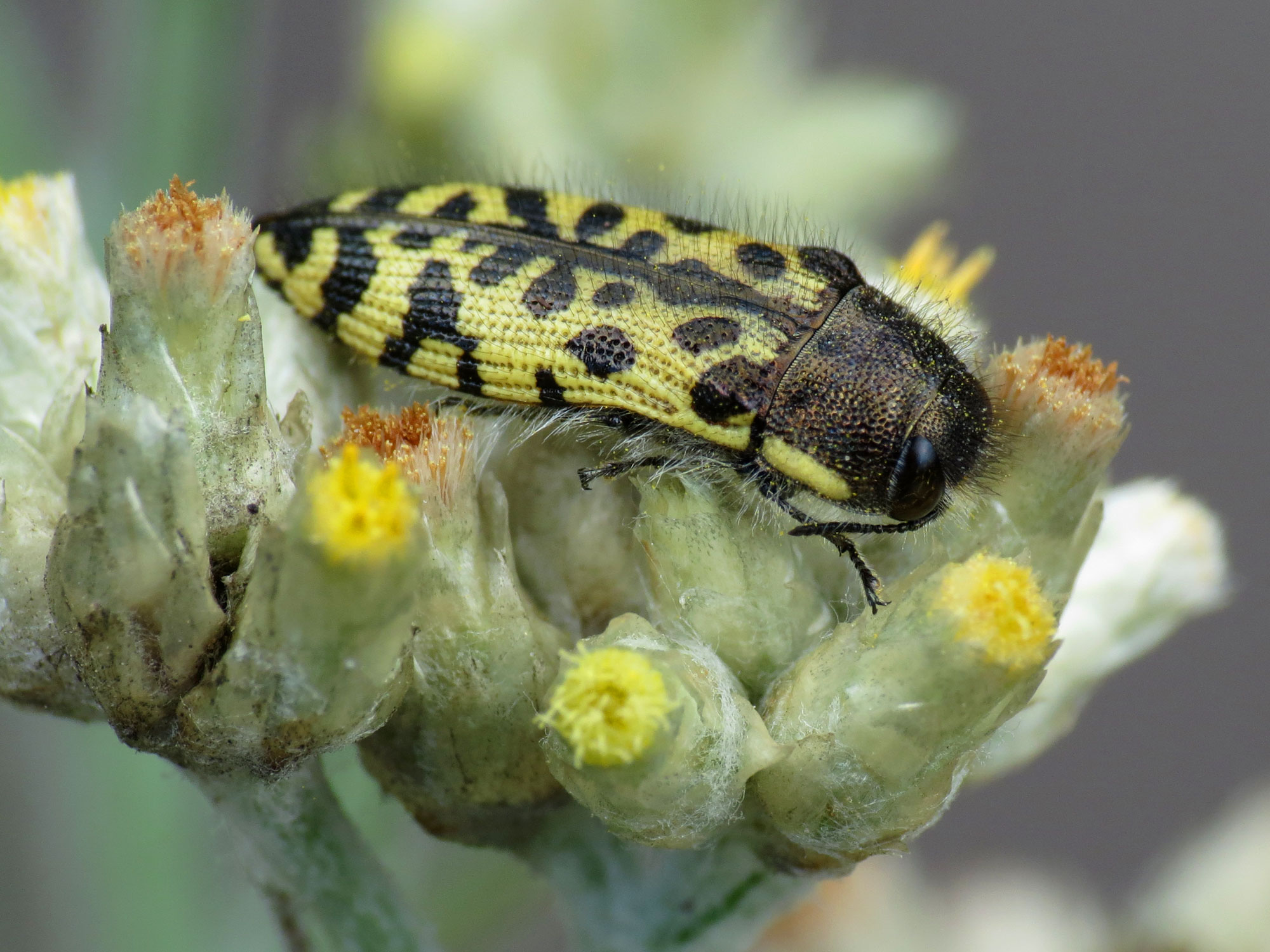
- Acmaeodera decipiens

Scientific classification
- Kingdom: Animalia
- Phylum: Arthropoda
- Clade: Pancrustacea
- Class: Insecta
- Order: Coleoptera
- Suborder: Polyphaga
- Infraorder: Elateriformia
- Family: Buprestidae
- Subfamily: Polycestinae
- Tribe: Acmaeoderini; Kerremans, 1893

= Acmaeoderini =

Tribe of beetles

Acmaeoderini is a tribe of metallic wood-boring beetles in the family Buprestidae. There are 15 genera and more than 700 described species in Acmaeoderini.

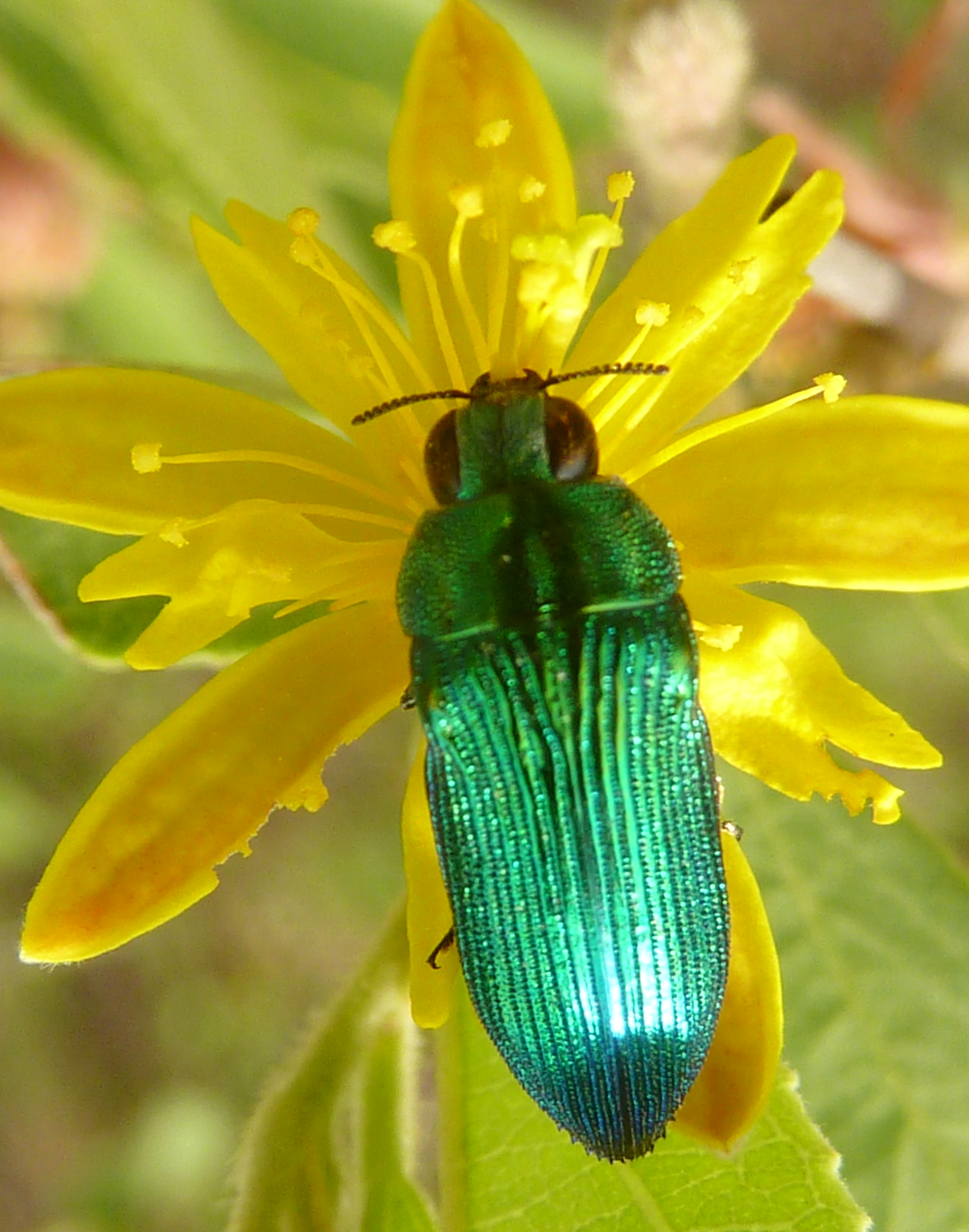
Acmaeodera viridaenea

== Genera ==
These genera belong to the tribe Acmaeoderini:

- Odettea Baudon, 1966
- Nothomorpha Saunders, 1871
- Nothomorphoides Holm, 1986
- Acmaeoderoides Van Dyke, 1942
- Paracmaeoderoides Bellamy & Westcott, 1996
- Acmaeodera Eschscholtz, 1829
- Acmaeoderella Cobos, 1955
- Acmaeoderopsis Barr, 1974
- Microacmaeodera Cobos, 1966
- Anambodera Barr, 1974
- Atacamita Moore, 1985
- Xantheremia Volkovitsh, 1979
- Brachmaeodera Volkovitsh & Bellamy, 1992
- Cochinchinula Volkovitsh, 1984
- Thaichinula Volkovitsh, 2008
