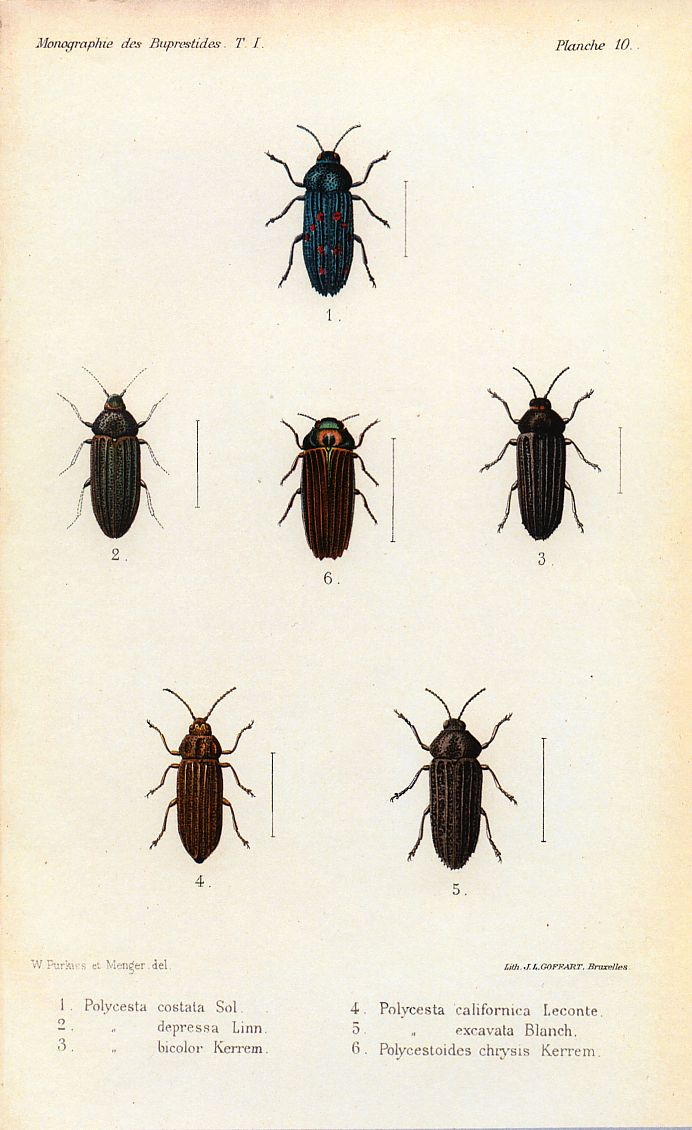
- Adults of 5 Polycesta species, with the close relative Polycestoides chrysis in center

Scientific classification
- Kingdom: Animalia
- Phylum: Arthropoda
- Clade: Pancrustacea
- Class: Insecta
- Order: Coleoptera
- Suborder: Polyphaga
- Infraorder: Elateriformia
- Family: Buprestidae
- Subfamily: Polycestinae
- Genus: Polycesta; Dejean, 1833

Type species
- Buprestis porcata Fabricius, 1775

Synonyms
- Lycaste Gistel, 1834

= Polycesta =

Genus of beetles

Polycesta is a widespread genus of jewel beetles (family Buprestidae) in the subfamily Polycestinae, containing the following species:

- Polycesta aequinoxialis Thomson, 1878
- Polycesta aethiops Saunders, 1870
- Polycesta afghanica Volkovitsh in Alexeev, et al., 1990
- Polycesta alternans Waterhouse, 1904
- Polycesta angulosa Jacqueline du Val, 1857
- Polycesta arizonica Schaeffer, 1906
- Polycesta aruensis Obenberger, 1924 (= P.deserticola)
- Polycesta bahamensis Moore & Diéguez, 2008
- Polycesta bicolor Kerremans, 1897
- Polycesta bilyi Cobos, 1990
- Polycesta brunneipennis Fisher, 1949
- Polycesta californica LeConte, 1857
- Polycesta cazieri Barr, 1949
- Polycesta constrictinotum Westcott, 1998
- Polycesta cortezii Thomson, 1878
- Polycesta costata (Solier, 1849)
- Polycesta crypta Barr, 1949
- Polycesta cubae Chevrolat, 1838
- Polycesta cuprofasciata Moore & Diéguez, 2008
- Polycesta cyanea Chamberlin, 1933
- Polycesta cyanipes (Fabricius, 1787)
- Polycesta decorata Moore & Diéguez, 2008
- Polycesta depressa (Linnaeus, 1771)
- Polycesta dominicana Cobos, 1990
- Polycesta elata LeConte, 1858
- Polycesta embriki Obenberger, 1936
- Polycesta excavata Blanchard, 1846
- Polycesta fisheri Obenberger, 1936
- Polycesta flavomaculata Nelson, 1960
- Polycesta fossulata (Péringuey, 1886)
- Polycesta garcetei Moore & Diéguez, 2008
- Polycesta goryi Saunders, 1871
- Polycesta gossei Waterhouse, 1904
- Polycesta guanacastensis Moore & Diéguez, 2008
- Polycesta hageni Barr, 1949
- Polycesta hermani Cobos, 1981
- Polycesta insulana Fisher, 1930
- Polycesta iranica (Obenberger, 1923)
- Polycesta mastersii Macleay, 1872
- Polycesta montezuma Gory & Laporte, 1838
- Polycesta olivieri Waterhouse, 1904
- Polycesta perfecta Kerremans, 1914
- Polycesta peringueyi Kerremans, 1909
- Polycesta perlucida Kerremans, 1897
- Polycesta plana Nelson, 2000
- Polycesta porcata (Fabricius, 1775)
- Polycesta regularis Waterhouse, 1904
- Polycesta strandi Obenberger, 1928
- Polycesta tamarugalis Moore & Diéguez, 2008
- Polycesta thomae Chevrolat, 1838
- Polycesta tonkinea Fairmaire, 1889
- Polycesta tularensis Chamberlin, 1938
- Polycesta variegata Waterhouse, 1904
- Polycesta velasco Gory & Laporte, 1838
- Polycesta viridicostata Neef de Sainval, 1998

Subgenera have been proposed as follows:

- Polycesta (Arizonica) – P.aruensis and relatives
- Polycesta (Jamaiquesia)
- Polycesta (Nelsonella)
- Polycesta (Polycesta)
- Polycesta (Tularensia) – P.tularensis and relatives

Polycesta (Theryola), containing only P.touzalini, turned out to be closer to Xenopsis and was elevated to a distinct genus Theryola.
