= Acmaeodera pinalorum =

Scientific classification
- Domain: Eukaryota
- Kingdom: Animalia
- Phylum: Arthropoda
- Class: Insecta
- Order: Coleoptera
- Suborder: Polyphaga
- Infraorder: Elateriformia
- Family: Buprestidae
- Subfamily: Polycestinae
- Tribe: Acmaeoderini
- Genus: Acmaeodera
- Species: A. pinalorum

Binomial name
- Acmaeodera pinalorum Knull, 1930

Species of beetle

Acmaeodera pinalorum is a species of metallic wood-boring beetle in the family Buprestidae. It is found in Central America and North America.
