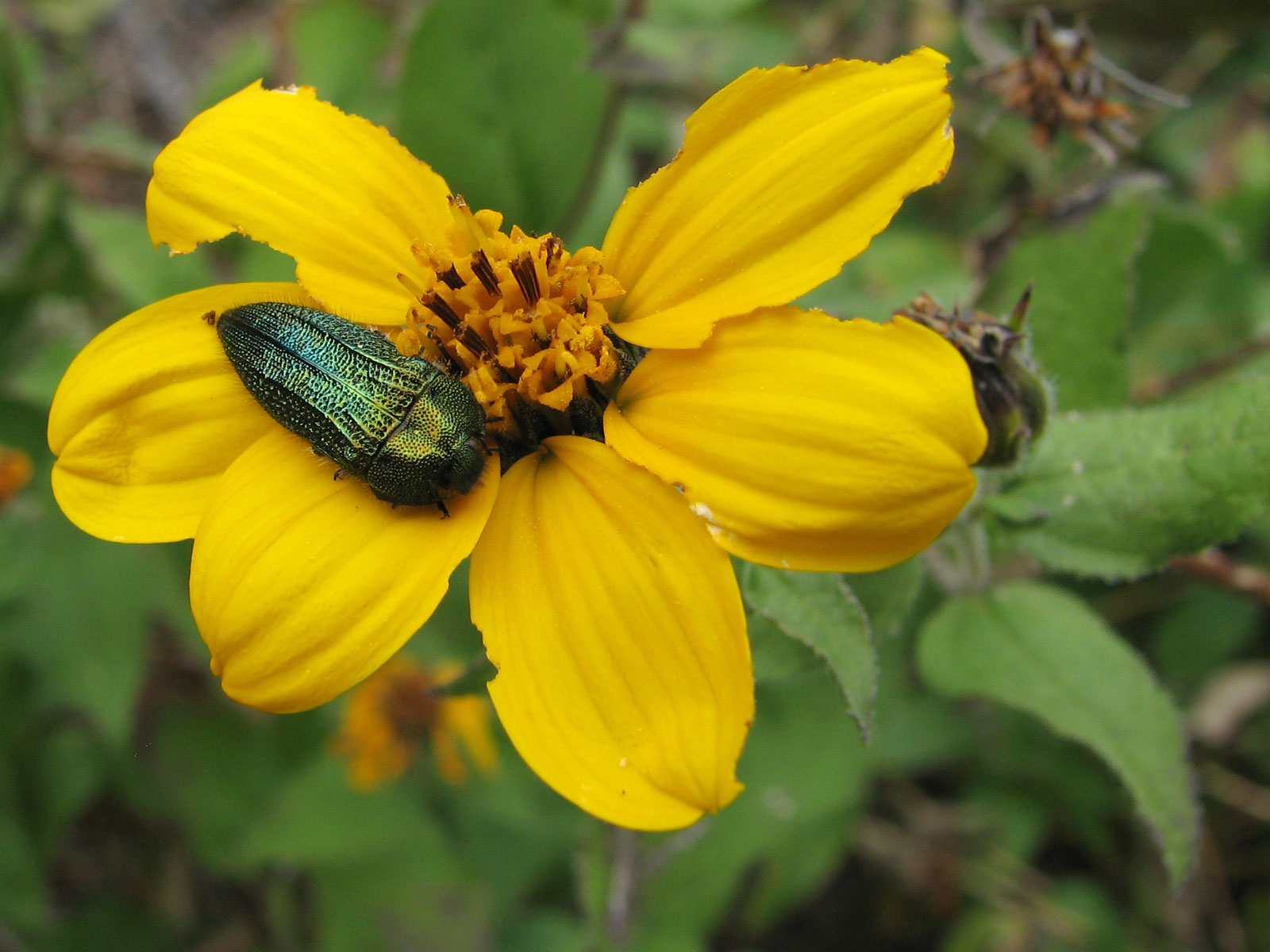
- Acmaeodera resplendens, Arizona

Scientific classification
- Domain: Eukaryota
- Kingdom: Animalia
- Phylum: Arthropoda
- Class: Insecta
- Order: Coleoptera
- Suborder: Polyphaga
- Infraorder: Elateriformia
- Family: Buprestidae
- Subfamily: Polycestinae
- Tribe: Acmaeoderini
- Genus: Acmaeodera
- Species: A. resplendens

Binomial name
- Acmaeodera resplendens Van Dyke, 1937

= Acmaeodera resplendens =

Species of beetle

Acmaeodera resplendens is a species of metallic wood-boring beetle in the family Buprestidae. It is found in North America.
