= Polycesta arizonica =

Scientific classification
- Domain: Eukaryota
- Kingdom: Animalia
- Phylum: Arthropoda
- Class: Insecta
- Order: Coleoptera
- Suborder: Polyphaga
- Infraorder: Elateriformia
- Family: Buprestidae
- Genus: Polycesta
- Species: P. arizonica

Binomial name
- Polycesta arizonica Schaeffer, 1906

Species of beetle

Polycesta arizonica is a species of metallic wood-boring beetle in the family Buprestidae. It is found in North America.

== Subspecies ==
These two subspecies belong to the species Polycesta arizonica:

- Polycesta arizonica acidota Cazier, 1951
- Polycesta arizonica arizonica Schaeffer, 1906
