= Polycesta aruensis =

Scientific classification
- Domain: Eukaryota
- Kingdom: Animalia
- Phylum: Arthropoda
- Class: Insecta
- Order: Coleoptera
- Suborder: Polyphaga
- Infraorder: Elateriformia
- Family: Buprestidae
- Genus: Polycesta
- Species: P. aruensis

Binomial name
- Polycesta aruensis Obenberger, 1924

Species of beetle

Polycesta aruensis is a species of metallic wood-boring beetle in the family Buprestidae. It is found in Central America and North America.
