= Thrincopyge =

Scientific classification
- Kingdom: Animalia
- Phylum: Arthropoda
- Class: Insecta
- Order: Coleoptera
- Suborder: Polyphaga
- Infraorder: Elateriformia
- Family: Buprestidae
- Tribe: Thrincopygini
- Genus: Thrincopyge; LeConte, 1858

Genus of beetles

Thrincopyge is a genus of "jewel beetles" in the subfamily Polycestinae, containing the following species:

- Thrincopyge alacris LeConte, 1858
- Thrincopyge ambiens (LeConte, 1854)
- Thrincopyge marginata Waterhouse, 1890
