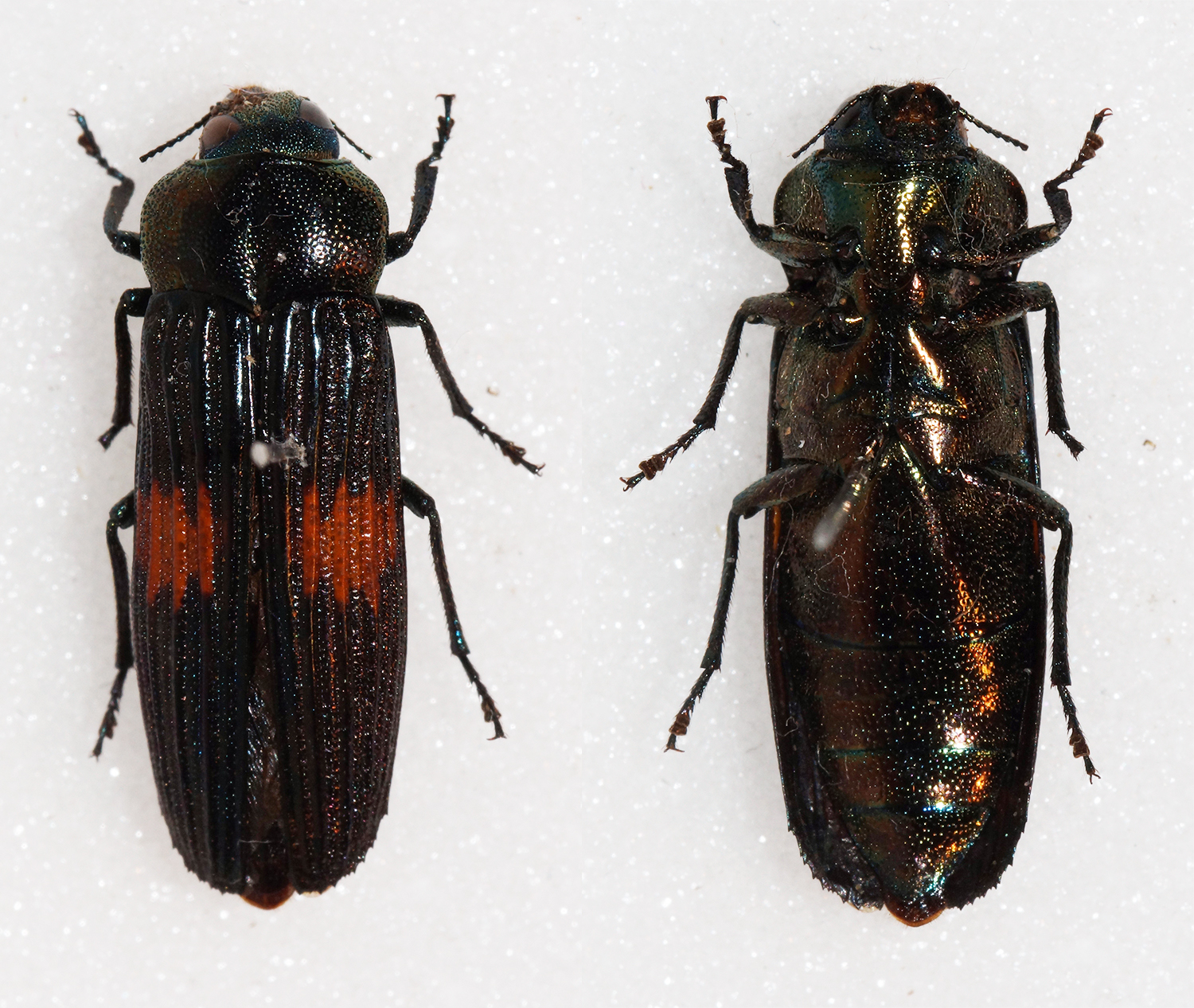
- Strigoptera bimaculata

Scientific classification
- Kingdom: Animalia
- Phylum: Arthropoda
- Class: Insecta
- Order: Coleoptera
- Suborder: Polyphaga
- Infraorder: Elateriformia
- Family: Buprestidae
- Tribe: Polycestini
- Genus: Strigoptera; Dejean, 1833

= Strigoptera =

Genus of beetles

Strigoptera is a genus of "jewel beetles" in the subfamily Polycestinae and tribe Polycestini.

== Species ==
Strigoptera includes the following:

- Strigoptera auromaculata (Saunders, 1867)
- Strigoptera bettoni (Waterhouse, 1904)
- Strigoptera bimaculata (Linnaeus, 1758)
- Strigoptera borneensis (Obenberger, 1924)
- Strigoptera cyanipennis (Deyrolle, 1864)
- Strigoptera fairmairei (Waterhouse, 1904)
- Strigoptera kubani Bellamy, 2006
- Strigoptera obsoleta (Chevrolat, 1841)
- Strigoptera pulchra (Waterhouse, 1904)
- Strigoptera rubripennis (Thery, 1923)
- Strigoptera socotra Zabransky, 2005
