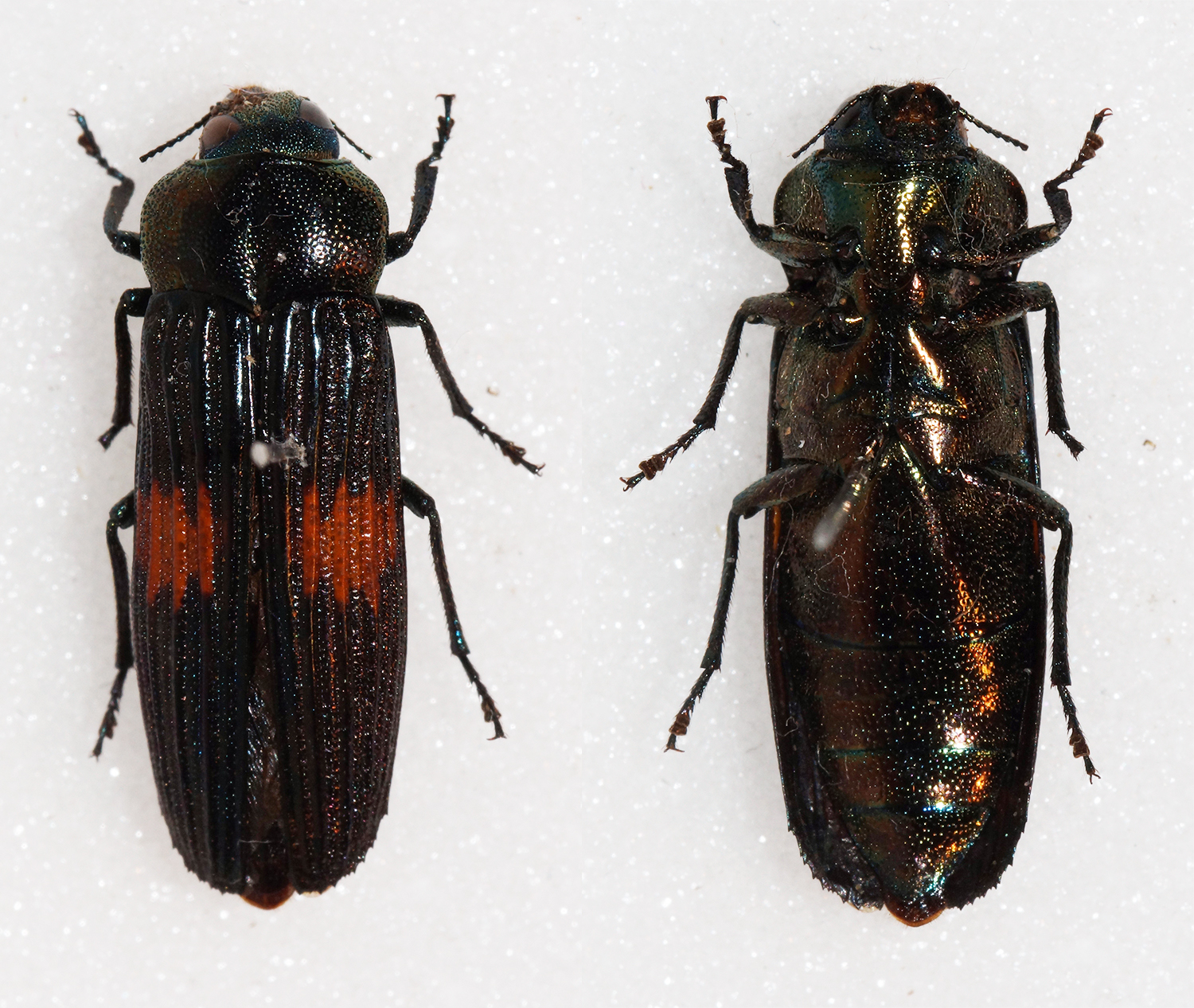
- Strigoptera bimaculata

Scientific classification
- Kingdom: Animalia
- Phylum: Arthropoda
- Clade: Pancrustacea
- Class: Insecta
- Order: Coleoptera
- Suborder: Polyphaga
- Infraorder: Elateriformia
- Family: Buprestidae
- Subfamily: Polycestinae
- Tribe: Polycestini
- Genus: Strigoptera
- Species: S. bimaculata

Binomial name
- Strigoptera bimaculata (Linnaeus, 1758)

Synonyms
- Buprestis bimaculata Linnaeus, 1758; Strigoptera annamica Nonfried, 1895; Strigoptera obscura Gestro, 1877; Strigoptera impustulata Gory, 1841; Strigoptera bipustulata Boisduval, 1835; Strigoptera pacifica Boisduval, 1835

= Strigoptera bimaculata =

Species of insect

Strigoptera bimaculata is the type species in its genus of jewel beetles: in the tribe Polycestini. Distribution records are from south-East Asia.
