= Acmaeoderoides humeralis =

Scientific classification
- Kingdom: Animalia
- Phylum: Arthropoda
- Class: Insecta
- Order: Coleoptera
- Suborder: Polyphaga
- Infraorder: Elateriformia
- Family: Buprestidae
- Genus: Acmaeoderoides
- Species: A. humeralis

Binomial name
- Acmaeoderoides humeralis (Cazier, 1938)

Species of beetle

Acmaeoderoides humeralis is a species of metallic wood-boring beetle in the family Buprestidae. It is found in North America.
