= Paratyndaris cincta =

Scientific classification
- Domain: Eukaryota
- Kingdom: Animalia
- Phylum: Arthropoda
- Class: Insecta
- Order: Coleoptera
- Suborder: Polyphaga
- Infraorder: Elateriformia
- Family: Buprestidae
- Genus: Paratyndaris
- Species: P. cincta

Binomial name
- Paratyndaris cincta (Horn, 1885)

Species of beetle

Paratyndaris cincta is a species of metallic wood-boring beetle in the family Buprestidae. It is found in Central America and North America.
