= Chrysophana =

Scientific classification
- Kingdom: Animalia
- Phylum: Arthropoda
- Class: Insecta
- Order: Coleoptera
- Suborder: Polyphaga
- Infraorder: Elateriformia
- Family: Buprestidae
- Tribe: Thrincopygini
- Genus: Chrysophana; LeConte, 1860

Genus of beetles

Chrysophana is a genus of beetles in the family Buprestidae, containing the following species:

- Chrysophana conicola Van Dyke, 1937
- Chrysophana holzschuhi Bily, 1984
- Chrysophana placida (LeConte, 1854)
