= Paratrachys =

Scientific classification
- Kingdom: Animalia
- Phylum: Arthropoda
- Class: Insecta
- Order: Coleoptera
- Suborder: Polyphaga
- Infraorder: Elateriformia
- Family: Buprestidae
- Genus: Paratrachys; Saunders, 1873

Genus of beetles

Paratrachys is a genus of "jewel beetles" in the subfamily Polycestinae and tribe Paratrachyini.

== Species ==
Paratrachys contains the following species:

- Paratrachys australius Bellamy & Williams, 1995
- Paratrachys bakeri Obenberger, 1924
- Paratrachys biroi Holynski, 1992
- Paratrachys chinensis Obenberger, 1958
- Paratrachys cornutus Bílý, 1994
- Paratrachys cuneiformis (Deyrolle, 1864)
- Paratrachys fergussonicus (Kerremans, 1900)
- Paratrachys fisheri Obenberger, 1924
- Paratrachys hederae Saunders, 1873
- Paratrachys hederoides Cobos, 1980
- Paratrachys hypocritus (Fairmaire, 1889)
- Paratrachys kannegieteri Obenberger, 1924
- Paratrachys kurosawai Holynski, 1992
- Paratrachys marylae Holynski, 1992
- Paratrachys mixtipubescens Kurosawa, 1985
- Paratrachys nadjus Cobos, 1980
- Paratrachys nigricans (Kerremans, 1890)
- Paratrachys nigritus (Deyrolle, 1864)
- Paratrachys pilifrons (Kerremans, 1900)
- Paratrachys princeps Kurosawa, 1976
- Paratrachys queenslandicus Bellamy & Williams, 1995
- Paratrachys sinicolus Obenberger, 1958
- Paratrachys srogli Obenberger, 1932
- Paratrachys strandi Obenberger, 1932
- Paratrachys tonyi Holynski, 1992
