= Thrincopyge ambiens =

Scientific classification
- Domain: Eukaryota
- Kingdom: Animalia
- Phylum: Arthropoda
- Class: Insecta
- Order: Coleoptera
- Suborder: Polyphaga
- Infraorder: Elateriformia
- Family: Buprestidae
- Genus: Thrincopyge
- Species: T. ambiens

Binomial name
- Thrincopyge ambiens (LeConte, 1854)

Species of beetle

Thrincopyge ambiens is a species of metallic wood-boring beetle in the family Buprestidae. It is found in Central America and North America.
