= Polycestis =

Scientific classification
- Kingdom: Animalia
- Phylum: Arthropoda
- Class: Insecta
- Order: Coleoptera
- Suborder: Polyphaga
- Infraorder: Elateriformia
- Family: Buprestidae
- Genus: Polycestis; Marseul, 1865

Genus of beetles

Polycestis is a genus of "jewel beetles" in the subfamily Polycestinae, containing the following species:

- Polycestis foveicollis Fairmaire, 1899
- Polycestis hauseri Obenberger, 1934
- Polycestis johanidesi Bily, 1997
- Polycestis rhois Marseul, 1865
- Polycestis strandi Obenberger, 1934
