= Sponsor (beetle) =

Scientific classification
- Domain: Eukaryota
- Kingdom: Animalia
- Phylum: Arthropoda
- Class: Insecta
- Order: Coleoptera
- Suborder: Polyphaga
- Infraorder: Elateriformia
- Family: Buprestidae
- Subfamily: Polycestinae
- Tribe: Paratrachyini
- Genus: Sponsor; Gory & Laporte, 1839

Genus of beetles

Sponsor is a genus of beetles in the family Buprestidae. It belongs within the tribe Paratrachyini within the subfamily Polycestinae,

== Species ==
These 120 species belong to the genus Sponsor:

- Sponsor aeneiventris Descarpentries, 1965
- Sponsor aeneolus Descarpentries, 1969
- Sponsor aeneus Guérin-Méneville, 1840
- Sponsor alluaudi Kerremans, 1894
- Sponsor ambiguus Lesne, 1937
- Sponsor androyensis Lesne, 1937
- Sponsor antamponensis Descarpentries, 1965
- Sponsor antanala Descarpentries, 1969
- Sponsor antelmei Lesne, 1918
- Sponsor anthracinus Descarpentries, 1965
- Sponsor antsihanaka Descarpentries, 1957
- Sponsor ater Descarpentries, 1965
- Sponsor auribasis Descarpentries, 1965
- Sponsor betsimisaraka Descarpentries, 1965
- Sponsor bicolor Descarpentries, 1965
- Sponsor burgeoni Théry in Lesne, 1937
- Sponsor caerulescens Guérin-Méneville, 1840
- Sponsor calo Descarpentries, 1965
- Sponsor carbonarius Théry, 1905
- Sponsor cariei Lesne, 1918
- Sponsor chalceus Descarpentries, 1965
- Sponsor chalybaeus Descarpentries, 1969
- Sponsor cobosi Bellamy, 1998
- Sponsor convexus Gory & Laporte, 1839
- Sponsor cupreoviolaceus Descarpentries, 1965
- Sponsor cupreoviridis Descarpentries, 1965
- Sponsor cupripennis Descarpentries, 1957
- Sponsor cyaneus Descarpentries, 1965
- Sponsor cyanipennis Descarpentries, 1965
- Sponsor deplanatus (Théry, 1905)
- Sponsor dermestoides Lesne, 1918
- Sponsor desjardinsii Guérin-Méneville, 1840
- Sponsor dissimilis Théry, 1931
- Sponsor distinctus Descarpentries, 1969
- Sponsor elegans Descarpentries, 1965
- Sponsor elongatus Descarpentries, 1965
- Sponsor emmaae Descarpentries, 1957
- Sponsor emmerezi Lesne, 1918
- Sponsor epicureus Descarpentries, 1965
- Sponsor epistomalis Descarpentries, 1957
- Sponsor fulgens Fairmaire, 1899
- Sponsor fusiformis Lesne, 1924
- Sponsor gagates Descarpentries, 1965
- Sponsor gemmatus Descarpentries, 1965
- Sponsor gianassoi Novak, 2002
- Sponsor grandis Lesne, 1937
- Sponsor granulicollis Descarpentries, 1965
- Sponsor gyrinoides Lesne, 1918
- Sponsor ignipennis Descarpentries, 1965
- Sponsor indicus Lesne, 1937
- Sponsor irideus Kerremans, 1902
- Sponsor janthinus (Fairmaire, 1886)
- Sponsor kerremansi (Théry, 1905)
- Sponsor lepidus Lesne, 1918
- Sponsor lesnei Théry, 1931
- Sponsor livens Descarpentries, 1965
- Sponsor macfadyeni Bellamy, 2004
- Sponsor malartici Lesne, 1922
- Sponsor mameti Descarpentries, 1957
- Sponsor mandraranus Lesne, 1924
- Sponsor marcsikae Holynski, 1997
- Sponsor melanopus Descarpentries, 1965
- Sponsor metallinus (Fairmaire, 1900)
- Sponsor mirabilis Descarpentries, 1969
- Sponsor montanus Descarpentries, 1969
- Sponsor monticola Descarpentries, 1969
- Sponsor montivagus Descarpentries, 1969
- Sponsor niger Descarpentries, 1969
- Sponsor nigricollis Descarpentries, 1965
- Sponsor nigroaeneus Descarpentries, 1965
- Sponsor nigrocyaneus Descarpentries, 1965
- Sponsor oblongus Kerremans, 1902
- Sponsor parilis Lesne, 1937
- Sponsor parvulus Guérin-Méneville, 1840
- Sponsor perrieri (Fairmaire, 1902)
- Sponsor pexipennis Lesne, 1937
- Sponsor peyrierasi Descarpentries, 1965
- Sponsor picea (Fisher, 1922)
- Sponsor pilosellus Kerremans, 1914
- Sponsor pinguis Guérin-Méneville, 1840
- Sponsor pseudelongatus Descarpentries, 1965
- Sponsor pseudepistomalis Descarpentries, 1965
- Sponsor pubescens Descarpentries, 1965
- Sponsor pulcher Lesne, 1937
- Sponsor pupa Lesne, 1924
- Sponsor purpureipennis Descarpentries, 1965
- Sponsor pygmaeus Lesne, 1922
- Sponsor raffrayi Théry, 1931
- Sponsor reunionensis Descarpentries, 1957
- Sponsor rodriganus Lesne, 1918
- Sponsor rufipes Descarpentries, 1965
- Sponsor rufitarsis Lesne, 1918
- Sponsor rutilans Descarpentries, 1965
- Sponsor satanas Descarpentries, 1965
- Sponsor semistrigosus (Fairmaire, 1902)
- Sponsor senescens Descarpentries, 1969
- Sponsor senilis Descarpentries, 1965
- Sponsor sericeus (Kerremans, 1894)
- Sponsor setosulus Lesne, 1937
- Sponsor seyrigi Descarpentries, 1957
- Sponsor similis Descarpentries, 1965
- Sponsor somaliensis Holm & Wentzel, 1991
- Sponsor splendens Guérin-Méneville, 1840
- Sponsor subparallelus Lesne, 1918
- Sponsor succinicola Descarpentries, 1969
- Sponsor theryi Lesne, 1937
- Sponsor tristis Descarpentries, 1965
- Sponsor vadoni Lesne, 1937
- Sponsor vadonianus Descarpentries, 1957
- Sponsor vetustus Descarpentries, 1965
- Sponsor viduus Descarpentries, 1969
- Sponsor viettei Descarpentries, 1965
- Sponsor vieui Descarpentries, 1965
- Sponsor villosus Lesne, 1922
- Sponsor vinsoni Lesne, 1937
- Sponsor violaceipennis Descarpentries, 1969
- Sponsor violaceus (Fairmaire, 1903)
- Sponsor viridiaenus Descarpentries, 1969
- Sponsor viridiauratus Descarpentries, 1965
- Sponsor viridicoerulans Descarpentries, 1965
