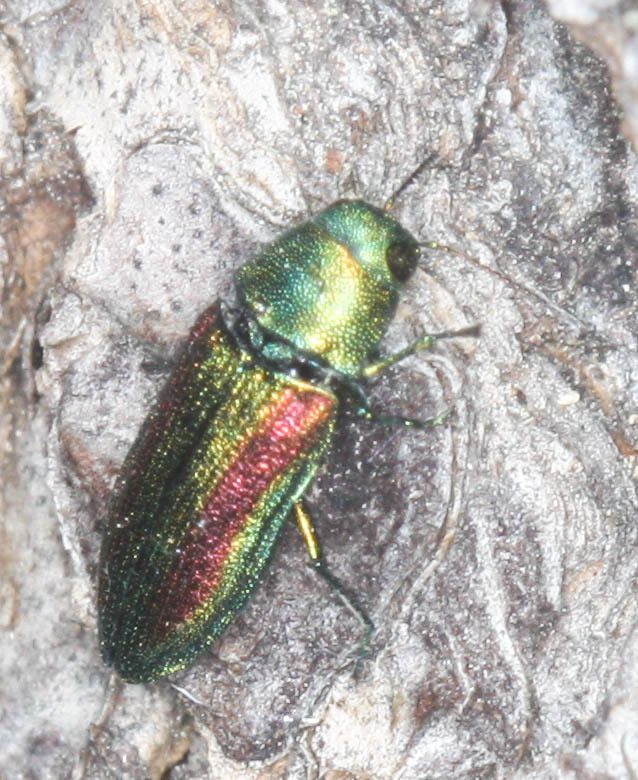

Scientific classification
- Kingdom: Animalia
- Phylum: Arthropoda
- Class: Insecta
- Order: Coleoptera
- Suborder: Polyphaga
- Infraorder: Elateriformia
- Family: Buprestidae
- Genus: Chrysophana
- Species: C. placida

Binomial name
- Chrysophana placida (LeConte, 1854)

= Chrysophana placida =

Species of beetle

Chrysophana placida is a species of metallic wood-boring beetle in the family Buprestidae. It is found in North America.
