= Paratyndaris =

Scientific classification
- Kingdom: Animalia
- Phylum: Arthropoda
- Class: Insecta
- Order: Coleoptera
- Suborder: Polyphaga
- Infraorder: Elateriformia
- Family: Buprestidae
- Tribe: Tyndarini
- Genus: Paratyndaris; Fisher, 1919

Genus of beetles

Paratyndaris is a genus of beetles in the family Buprestidae, containing the following species:

- Paratyndaris acaciae Knull, 1937
- Paratyndaris albofasciata Knull, 1937
- Paratyndaris anomalis Knull, 1937
- Paratyndaris antillarum Fisher, 1940
- Paratyndaris barberi (Skinner, 1903)
- Paratyndaris chamaeleonis (Skinner, 1903)
- Paratyndaris cincta (Horn, 1885)
- Paratyndaris costata Nelson & Bellamy, 2004
- Paratyndaris coursetiae Fisher, 1919
- Paratyndaris crandalli Knull, 1941
- Paratyndaris dozieri Nelson & Bellamy, 2004
- Paratyndaris equihuai Westcott, 2000
- Paratyndaris grassmani Parker, 1947
- Paratyndaris knulli (Barr, 1972)
- Paratyndaris lateralis (Barr, 1972)
- Paratyndaris mexicana Fisher, 1933
- Paratyndaris mimica Nelson & Bellamy, 2004
- Paratyndaris mojito (Bílý, 1987)
- Paratyndaris nelsoni (Barr, 1972)
- Paratyndaris olneyae (Skinner, 1903)
- Paratyndaris paralateralis Nelson & Bellamy, 2004
- Paratyndaris peninsularis Westcott, 2000
- Paratyndaris prosopis (Skinner, 1903)
- Paratyndaris pulchra Nelson & Bellamy, 2004
- Paratyndaris quadrinotata Knull, 1938
- Paratyndaris robusta (Dozier, 1988)
- Paratyndaris similis Nelson & Bellamy, 2004
- Paratyndaris subcostata (Barr, 1972)
- Paratyndaris suturalis Fall, 1934
- Paratyndaris trilobata Westcott, 2000
- Paratyndaris tucsoni Knull, 1938
- Paratyndaris turbida Nelson & Bellamy, 2004
- Paratyndaris uniformis Nelson & Bellamy, 2004
- Paratyndaris variabilis Westcott, 2000
- Paratyndaris verityi Nelson & Bellamy, 2004
- Paratyndaris westcotti Nelson & Bellamy, 2004
