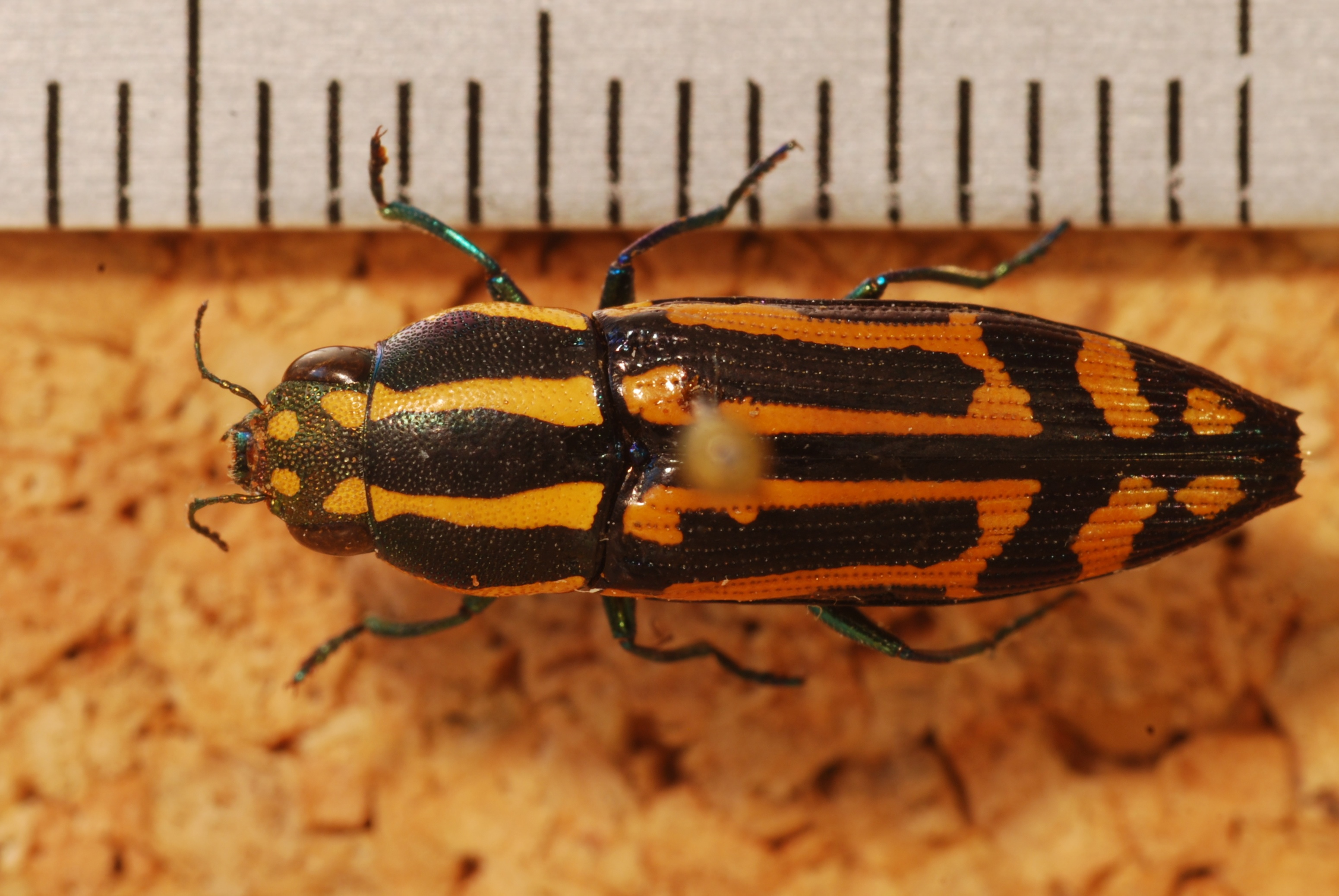
- Schoutedeniastes ohkurai

Scientific classification
- Kingdom: Animalia
- Phylum: Arthropoda
- Class: Insecta
- Order: Coleoptera
- Suborder: Polyphaga
- Infraorder: Elateriformia
- Family: Buprestidae
- Genus: Schoutedeniastes; Burgeon, 1941

= Schoutedeniastes =

Genus of beetles

Schoutedeniastes is a genus of "jewel beetles" in the subfamily Polycestinae, containing the following species:

- Schoutedeniastes amabilis (Laporte & Gory, 1835)
- Schoutedeniastes apicata (Waterhouse, 1882)
- Schoutedeniastes birmanica (Thery, 1947)
- Schoutedeniastes duaulti Baudon, 1962
- Schoutedeniastes hatai (Ohmomo & Akiyama, 1994)
- Schoutedeniastes heiroglyphica (Thery, 1904)
- Schoutedeniastes igorrota (Heller, 1891)
- Schoutedeniastes magnifica (Waterhouse, 1875)
- Schoutedeniastes ohkurai (Akiyama & Ohmomo, 1992)
- Schoutedeniastes vitalisi (Bourgoin, 1922)
