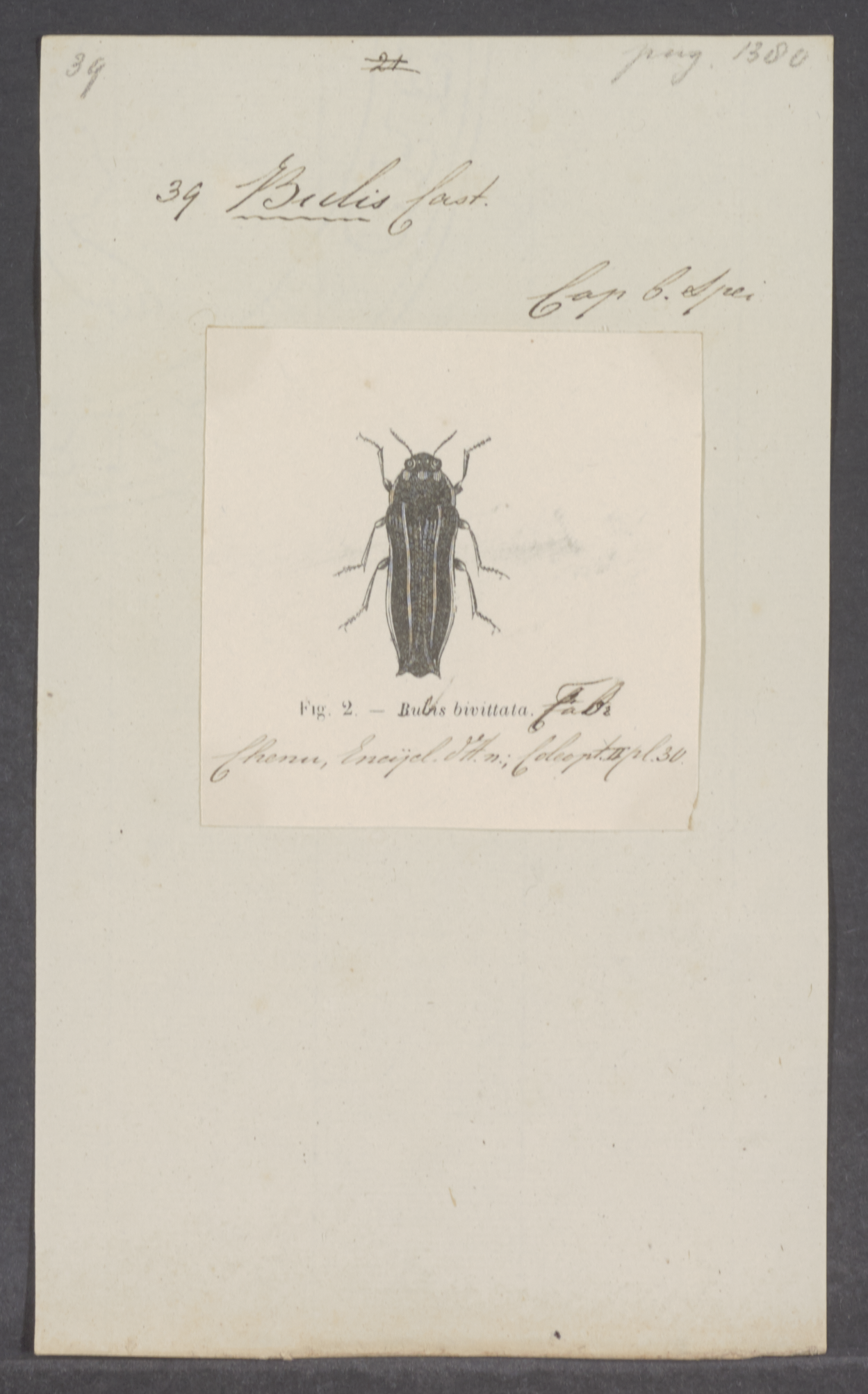
- Bulis bivittata

Scientific classification
- Kingdom: Animalia
- Phylum: Arthropoda
- Class: Insecta
- Order: Coleoptera
- Suborder: Polyphaga
- Infraorder: Elateriformia
- Family: Buprestidae
- Genus: Bulis laporte & Gory, 1837
- Species: B. bivittata

Binomial name
- Bulis bivittata (Fabricius, 1801)

= Bulis =

Bulis bivittata

Genus of beetles

Bulis bivittata is a species of "jewel beetles" in the subfamily Polycestinae, the only species in the genus Bulis.
