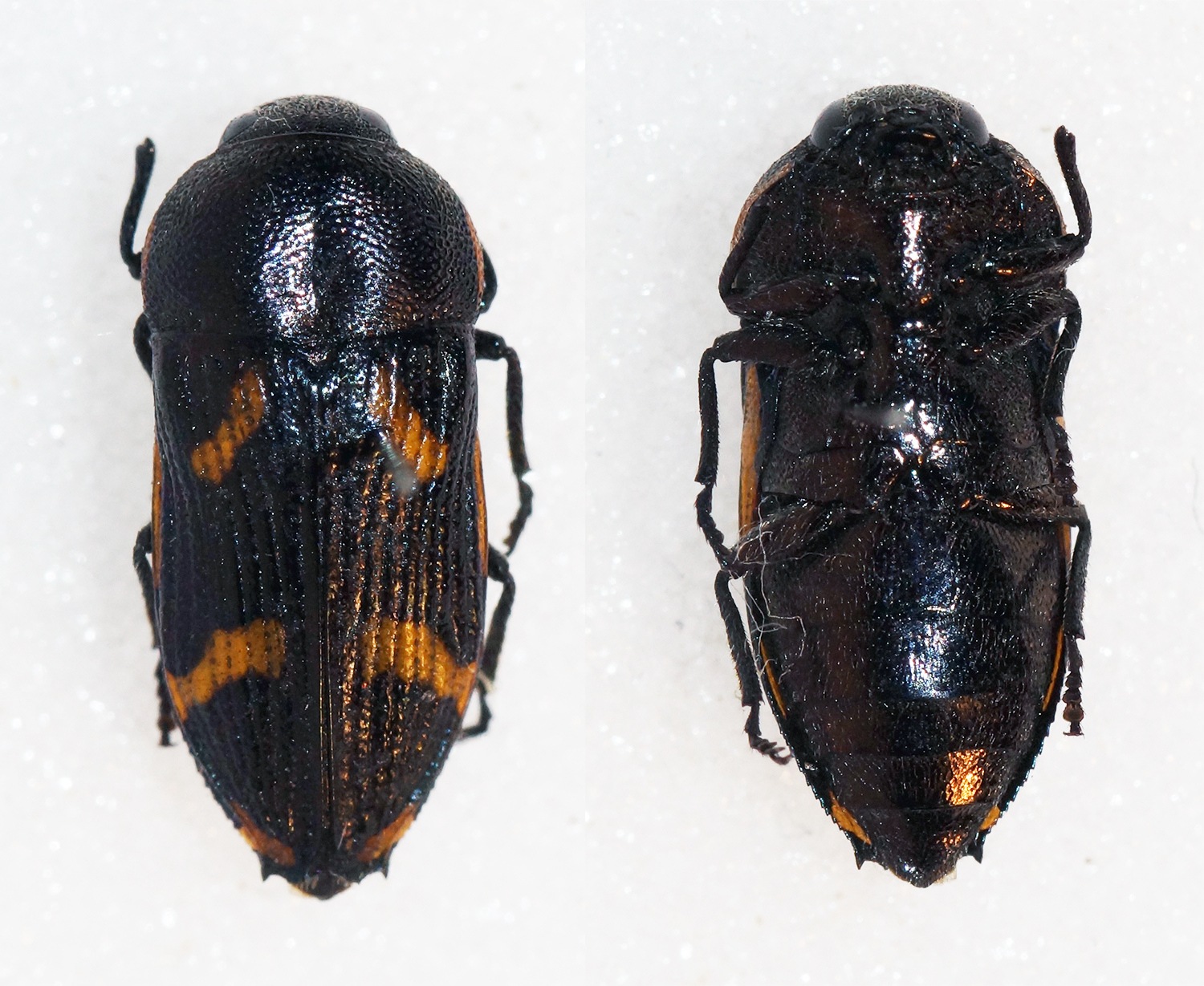
- Tyndaris planata

Scientific classification
- Kingdom: Animalia
- Phylum: Arthropoda
- Class: Insecta
- Order: Coleoptera
- Suborder: Polyphaga
- Infraorder: Elateriformia
- Family: Buprestidae
- Genus: Tyndaris; Thomson, 1857

Type species
- Tyndaris planata

= Tyndaris (beetle) =

Genus of beetles

Tyndaris is a genus of "jewel beetles" in the subfamily Polycestinae, containing the following species:

- Tyndaris marginella Fairmaire & Germain, 1858
- Tyndaris patagiata (Berg, 1885)
- Tyndaris planata (Laporte & Gory, 1835)
