= Perucola =

Perucola picturata

Scientific classification
- Kingdom: Animalia
- Phylum: Arthropoda
- Class: Insecta
- Order: Coleoptera
- Suborder: Polyphaga
- Infraorder: Elateriformia
- Family: Buprestidae
- Genus: Perucola; Thery, 1925
- Species: P. picturata

Binomial name
- Perucola picturata Thery, 1925

Genus of beetles

Perucola picturata is a species of "jewel beetles" in the subfamily Polycestinae, the only species in the genus Perucola.
