= Polycesta californica =

Scientific classification
- Domain: Eukaryota
- Kingdom: Animalia
- Phylum: Arthropoda
- Class: Insecta
- Order: Coleoptera
- Suborder: Polyphaga
- Infraorder: Elateriformia
- Family: Buprestidae
- Genus: Polycesta
- Species: P. californica

Binomial name
- Polycesta californica LeConte, 1857

Synonyms
- Polycesta bernardensis Obenberger, 1924; Polycesta cribrana Motschulsky, 1859

Species of beetle

Polycesta californica is a species of metallic wood-boring beetle in the family Buprestidae. It is found in North America.
