= Xyroscelis =

Scientific classification
- Kingdom: Animalia
- Phylum: Arthropoda
- Class: Insecta
- Order: Coleoptera
- Suborder: Polyphaga
- Infraorder: Elateriformia
- Family: Buprestidae
- Genus: Xyroscelis; Saunders, 1868

Genus of beetles

Xyroscelis is a genus of "jewel beetles" in the subfamily Polycestinae, containing the following species:

- Xyroscelis bumana Williams & Watkins, 1986
- Xyroscelis crocata (Gory & Laporte, 1839)
