= Polycesta tularensis =

Scientific classification
- Domain: Eukaryota
- Kingdom: Animalia
- Phylum: Arthropoda
- Class: Insecta
- Order: Coleoptera
- Suborder: Polyphaga
- Infraorder: Elateriformia
- Family: Buprestidae
- Genus: Polycesta
- Species: P. tularensis

Binomial name
- Polycesta tularensis Chamberlin, 1938

Species of beetle

Polycesta tularensis is a species of metallic wood-boring beetle in the family Buprestidae. It is found in North America.
