= Nothomorphoides =

Scientific classification
- Kingdom: Animalia
- Phylum: Arthropoda
- Class: Insecta
- Order: Coleoptera
- Suborder: Polyphaga
- Infraorder: Elateriformia
- Family: Buprestidae
- Subfamily: Polycestinae
- Tribe: Acmaeoderini
- Subtribe: Nothomorphina
- Genus: Nothomorphoides; Holm, 1986
- Species: N. irishi

Binomial name
- Nothomorphoides irishi Holm, 1986

Genus of beetles

Nothomorphoides irishi is a species of beetle in the family Buprestidae, the only species in the genus Nothomorphoides.
