= Polycestina =

Scientific classification
- Kingdom: Animalia
- Phylum: Arthropoda
- Class: Insecta
- Order: Coleoptera
- Suborder: Polyphaga
- Infraorder: Elateriformia
- Family: Buprestidae
- Genus: Polycestina; Cobos, 1981

Genus of beetles

Polycestina is a genus of beetles in the family Buprestidae, containing the following species:

- Polycestina damarana (Kerremans, 1906)
- Polycestina kameli Neef de Sainval, 2002
- Polycestina quaturodecimmaculata (Fahraeus, 1851)
