= Tyndarimorpha =

Tyndarimorpha areolata

Scientific classification
- Kingdom: Animalia
- Phylum: Arthropoda
- Class: Insecta
- Order: Coleoptera
- Suborder: Polyphaga
- Infraorder: Elateriformia
- Family: Buprestidae
- Genus: Tyndarimorpha; Moore & Dieguez, 2006
- Species: T. areolata

Binomial name
- Tyndarimorpha areolata (Perty, 1830)

Genus of beetles

Tyndarimorpha areolata is a species of beetles in the family Buprestidae, the only species in the genus Tyndarimorpha.
