= Strigopteroides =

Scientific classification
- Kingdom: Animalia
- Phylum: Arthropoda
- Class: Insecta
- Order: Coleoptera
- Suborder: Polyphaga
- Infraorder: Elateriformia
- Family: Buprestidae
- Genus: Strigopteroides; Cobos, 1981

Genus of beetles

Strigopteroides is a genus of beetles in the family Buprestidae, containing the following species:

- Strigopteroides aegyptiaca (Gmelin, 1790)
- Strigopteroides margotanae Novak, 1995
- Strigopteroides semenowi (Obenberger, 1934)
