= Hayekina =

Hayekina dispar

Scientific classification
- Kingdom: Animalia
- Phylum: Arthropoda
- Class: Insecta
- Order: Coleoptera
- Suborder: Polyphaga
- Infraorder: Elateriformia
- Family: Buprestidae
- Genus: Hayekina; Cobos, 1980
- Species: H. dispar

Binomial name
- Hayekina dispar (Kerremans, 1899)

Genus of beetles

Hayekina dispar is a species of beetles in the family Buprestidae, the only species in the genus Hayekina.
