= Acmaeoderoides =

Scientific classification
- Kingdom: Animalia
- Phylum: Arthropoda
- Class: Insecta
- Order: Coleoptera
- Suborder: Polyphaga
- Infraorder: Elateriformia
- Family: Buprestidae
- Tribe: Acmaeoderini
- Genus: Acmaeoderoides; Van Dyke, 1942

Genus of beetles

Acmaeoderoides is a genus of beetles in the family Buprestidae, containing the following species:

- Acmaeoderoides cazieri Nelson, 1968
- Acmaeoderoides confusus Nelson, 1999
- Acmaeoderoides depressus Nelson, 1968
- Acmaeoderoides distinctus Nelson, 1968
- Acmaeoderoides ferruginis Wellso & Nelson in Nelson, 1968
- Acmaeoderoides humeralis (Cazier, 1938)
- Acmaeoderoides insignis (Horn, 1894)
- Acmaeoderoides knulli Nelson, 1968
- Acmaeoderoides rossi (Cazier, 1937)
- Acmaeoderoides rufescens Nelson, 1968
- Acmaeoderoides stramineus Nelson, 1968
- Acmaeoderoides verityi Nelson, 1968
