= Pelycothorax =

Pelycothorax tylauchenioides

Scientific classification
- Kingdom: Animalia
- Phylum: Arthropoda
- Class: Insecta
- Order: Coleoptera
- Suborder: Polyphaga
- Infraorder: Elateriformia
- Family: Buprestidae
- Genus: Pelycothorax; Bellamy & Westcott, 1996
- Species: P. tylauchenioides

Binomial name
- Pelycothorax tylauchenioides Bellamy & Westcott, 1996

Genus of beetles

Pelycothorax tylauchenioides is a species of beetles in the family Buprestidae, the only species in the genus Pelycothorax.
