= Ancylotela =

Ancylotela oculata

Scientific classification
- Kingdom: Animalia
- Phylum: Arthropoda
- Class: Insecta
- Order: Coleoptera
- Suborder: Polyphaga
- Infraorder: Elateriformia
- Family: Buprestidae
- Genus: Ancylotela; Waterhouse, 1882
- Species: A. oculata

Binomial name
- Ancylotela oculata Waterhouse, 1882

Genus of beetles

Ancylotela oculata is a species of beetles in the family Buprestidae, the only species in the genus Ancylotela.
