= Pseudopolycesta =

Pseudopolycesta tigrina

Scientific classification
- Kingdom: Animalia
- Phylum: Arthropoda
- Class: Insecta
- Order: Coleoptera
- Suborder: Polyphaga
- Infraorder: Elateriformia
- Family: Buprestidae
- Genus: Pseudopolycesta; Cobos, 1981
- Species: P. tigrina

Binomial name
- Pseudopolycesta tigrina (Gory & Laporte, 1838)

Genus of beetles

Pseudopolycesta tigrina is a species of beetles in the family Buprestidae, the only species in the genus Pseudopolycesta.
