= Micropolycesta =

Micropolycesta sirgueyi

Scientific classification
- Kingdom: Animalia
- Phylum: Arthropoda
- Class: Insecta
- Order: Coleoptera
- Suborder: Polyphaga
- Infraorder: Elateriformia
- Family: Buprestidae
- Genus: Micropolycesta; Cobos, 1981
- Species: M. sirgueyi

Binomial name
- Micropolycesta sirgueyi (Thery, 1926)

Genus of beetles

Micropolycesta sirgueyi is a species of beetles in the family Buprestidae, the only species in the genus Micropolycesta.
