= Polycestella =

Polycestella curta

Scientific classification
- Kingdom: Animalia
- Phylum: Arthropoda
- Class: Insecta
- Order: Coleoptera
- Suborder: Polyphaga
- Infraorder: Elateriformia
- Family: Buprestidae
- Genus: Polycestella; Kerremans, 1902
- Species: P. curta

Binomial name
- Polycestella curta (Kerremans, 1892)

Genus of beetles

Polycestella curta is a species of beetles in the family Buprestidae, the only species in the genus Polycestella.
