= Jelinekia =

Scientific classification
- Kingdom: Animalia
- Phylum: Arthropoda
- Class: Insecta
- Order: Coleoptera
- Suborder: Polyphaga
- Infraorder: Elateriformia
- Superfamily: Buprestoidea
- Family: Buprestidae
- Genus: Jelinekia; Cobos, 1981
- Species: J. barri

Binomial name
- Jelinekia barri (Nelson, 1975)

Genus of beetles

Jelinekia barri is a species of beetles in the family Buprestidae, the only species in the genus Jelinekia.
