= Polycestaxia =

Polycestaxia howas

Scientific classification
- Kingdom: Animalia
- Phylum: Arthropoda
- Class: Insecta
- Order: Coleoptera
- Suborder: Polyphaga
- Infraorder: Elateriformia
- Family: Buprestidae
- Genus: Polycestaxia; Cobos, 1981
- Species: P. howas

Binomial name
- Polycestaxia howas (Kerremans, 1894)

Genus of beetles

Polycestaxia howas is a species of beetle in the family Buprestidae, the only species in the genus Polycestaxia.
