= Pseudacherusia =

Scientific classification
- Kingdom: Animalia
- Phylum: Arthropoda
- Class: Insecta
- Order: Coleoptera
- Suborder: Polyphaga
- Infraorder: Elateriformia
- Family: Buprestidae
- Genus: Pseudacherusia; Kerremans, 1905

Genus of beetles

Pseudacherusia is a genus of beetles in the family Buprestidae, containing the following species:

- Pseudacherusia bartoni Obenberger, 1940
- Pseudacherusia theryi Kerremans, 1905
