= Hiperleptodema =

Hiperleptodema enigmatica

Scientific classification
- Kingdom: Animalia
- Phylum: Arthropoda
- Class: Insecta
- Order: Coleoptera
- Suborder: Polyphaga
- Infraorder: Elateriformia
- Family: Buprestidae
- Genus: Hiperleptodema; Bellamy, 1998
- Species: H. enigmatica

Binomial name
- Hiperleptodema enigmatica Bellamy, 1998

Genus of beetles

Hiperleptodema enigmatica is a species of beetle in the family Buprestidae, the only species in the genus Hiperleptodema.
