= Kogania =

Kogania hyleae

Scientific classification
- Kingdom: Animalia
- Phylum: Arthropoda
- Class: Insecta
- Order: Coleoptera
- Suborder: Polyphaga
- Infraorder: Elateriformia
- Family: Buprestidae
- Genus: Kogania; Cobos, 1981
- Species: K. hyleae

Binomial name
- Kogania hyleae (Kogan, 1961)

Genus of beetles

Kogania hyleae is a species of beetles in the family Buprestidae, the only species in the genus Kogania.
