= Bellamyina =

Bellamyina huanensis

Scientific classification
- Kingdom: Animalia
- Phylum: Arthropoda
- Class: Insecta
- Order: Coleoptera
- Suborder: Polyphaga
- Infraorder: Elateriformia
- Family: Buprestidae
- Genus: Bellamyina; Bily, 1994
- Species: B. huanensis

Binomial name
- Bellamyina huanensis (Zhong-liang, 1992)

Genus of beetles

Bellamyina huanensis is a species of beetles in the family Buprestidae, the only species in the genus Bellamyina.
