= Madecacesta =

Madecacesta gaudroni

Scientific classification
- Kingdom: Animalia
- Phylum: Arthropoda
- Class: Insecta
- Order: Coleoptera
- Suborder: Polyphaga
- Infraorder: Elateriformia
- Family: Buprestidae
- Genus: Madecacesta; Descarpentries, 1975
- Species: M. gaudroni

Binomial name
- Madecacesta gaudroni Descarpentries, 1975

Genus of beetles

Madecacesta gaudroni is a species of beetle in the family Buprestidae, the only species in the genus Madecacesta.
