= Sommaia =

Scientific classification
- Kingdom: Animalia
- Phylum: Arthropoda
- Class: Insecta
- Order: Coleoptera
- Suborder: Polyphaga
- Infraorder: Elateriformia
- Family: Buprestidae
- Genus: Sommaia; Toyama, 1985

Genus of beetles

Sommaia is a genus of beetles in the family Buprestidae, containing the following species:

- Sommaia gibber Toyama, 1985
- Sommaia kalabi Volkovitsh, 2008
