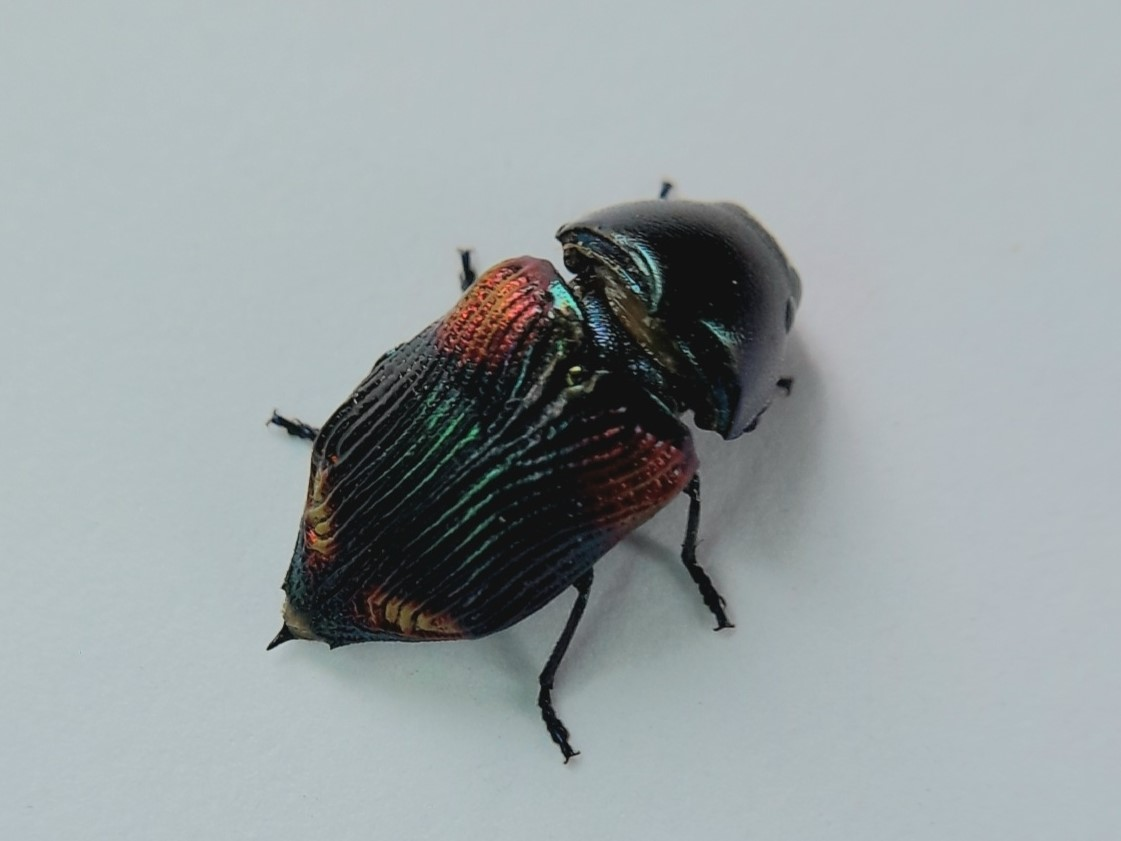
- Mimicoclytrina childreni

Scientific classification
- Kingdom: Animalia
- Phylum: Arthropoda
- Class: Insecta
- Order: Coleoptera
- Suborder: Polyphaga
- Infraorder: Elateriformia
- Family: Buprestidae
- Genus: Mimicoclytrina; Bellamy, 2003

= Mimicoclytrina =

Genus of beetles

Mimicoclytrina is a genus of beetles in the family Buprestidae. It contains the following species:

- Mimicoclytrina childreni (Laporte & Gory, 1835)
- Mimicoclytrina parrii (Saunders, 1869)
- Mimicoclytrina piliventris (Saunders, 1869)
- Mimicoclytrina saundersii (Waterhouse, 1904)
- Mimicoclytrina tristis (Thomson, 1878)
