= Beerellus =

Beerellus taxodii

Scientific classification
- Kingdom: Animalia
- Phylum: Arthropoda
- Class: Insecta
- Order: Coleoptera
- Suborder: Polyphaga
- Infraorder: Elateriformia
- Family: Buprestidae
- Genus: Beerellus; Nelson, 1982
- Species: B. taxodii

Binomial name
- Beerellus taxodii Nelson, 1982

Genus of beetles

Beerellus taxodii is a species of beetles in the family Buprestidae, the only species in the genus Beerellus.
