= Blepharum =

Scientific classification
- Kingdom: Animalia
- Phylum: Arthropoda
- Class: Insecta
- Order: Coleoptera
- Suborder: Polyphaga
- Infraorder: Elateriformia
- Family: Buprestidae
- Genus: Blepharum; Thomson, 1878

Genus of beetles

The unscientific moth genus name Blepharum refers to the genus Catocala.

Blepharum is a genus of beetles in the family Buprestidae, containing the following species:

- Blepharum bivittatum Kerremans, 1891
- Blepharum coeruleipes Fairmaire, 1878
- Blepharum leopardum Fisher, 1930
- Blepharum nigrum Thomson, 1878
- Blepharum sainvali (Bily, 2000)
