= Parapolycesta =

Parapolycesta cobosi

Scientific classification
- Kingdom: Animalia
- Phylum: Arthropoda
- Clade: Pancrustacea
- Class: Insecta
- Order: Coleoptera
- Suborder: Polyphaga
- Infraorder: Elateriformia
- Family: Buprestidae
- Genus: Parapolycesta; Cobos, 1981
- Species: P. cobosi

Binomial name
- Parapolycesta cobosi (Descarpentries, 1975)

Genus of beetles

Parapolycesta cobosi is a species of beetle in the family Buprestidae, the only species in the genus Parapolycesta.
