= Richtersveldia =

Richtersveldia insperata

Scientific classification
- Kingdom: Animalia
- Phylum: Arthropoda
- Class: Insecta
- Order: Coleoptera
- Suborder: Polyphaga
- Infraorder: Elateriformia
- Family: Buprestidae
- Genus: Richtersveldia; Bellamy, 2005
- Species: R. insperata

Binomial name
- Richtersveldia insperata Bellamy, 2005

Genus of beetles

Richtersveldia insperata is a species of beetles in the family Buprestidae, the only species in the genus Richtersveldia.
