= Paraancylotela =

Paraancylotela amplidorsa

Scientific classification
- Kingdom: Animalia
- Phylum: Arthropoda
- Class: Insecta
- Order: Coleoptera
- Suborder: Polyphaga
- Infraorder: Elateriformia
- Family: Buprestidae
- Genus: Paraancylotela; Cobos, 1959
- Species: P. amplidorsa

Binomial name
- Paraancylotela amplidorsa (Kerreman, 1914)

Genus of beetles

Paraancylotela amplidorsa is a species of beetles in the family Buprestidae, the only species in the genus Paraancylotela.
