= Kurosawaxia =

Kurosawaxia iris

Scientific classification
- Kingdom: Animalia
- Phylum: Arthropoda
- Class: Insecta
- Order: Coleoptera
- Suborder: Polyphaga
- Infraorder: Elateriformia
- Family: Buprestidae
- Genus: Kurosawaxia; Descarpentries, 1986
- Species: K. iris

Binomial name
- Kurosawaxia iris Descarpentries, 1986

Genus of beetles

Kurosawaxia iris is a species of beetles in the family Buprestidae, the only species in the genus Kurosawaxia.
