= Paracastalia =

Scientific classification
- Kingdom: Animalia
- Phylum: Arthropoda
- Class: Insecta
- Order: Coleoptera
- Suborder: Polyphaga
- Infraorder: Elateriformia
- Family: Buprestidae
- Genus: Paracastalia; Kerremans, 1902

Genus of beetles

Paracastalia is a genus of beetles in the family Buprestidae, containing the following species:

- Paracastalia bettoni Waterhouse, 1904
- Paracastalia duvivieri (Kerremans, 1898)
- Paracastalia gebhardti (Hoscheck, 1931)
- Paracastalia inornata (Kerremans, 1906)
- Paracastalia louwi Hohn, 1982
- Paracastalia minima Kerremans, 1905
- Paracastalia plagiata (Kerremans, 1899)
- Paracastalia scholtzi Holm, 1982
