= Aldabrica =

Aldabrica fryeri

Scientific classification
- Kingdom: Animalia
- Phylum: Arthropoda
- Class: Insecta
- Order: Coleoptera
- Suborder: Polyphaga
- Infraorder: Elateriformia
- Family: Buprestidae
- Genus: Aldabrica; Cobos, 1981
- Species: A. fryeri

Binomial name
- Aldabrica fryeri (Kerremans, 1914)

Genus of beetles

Aldabrica fryeri is a species of beetles in the family Buprestidae, the only species in the genus Aldabrica.
