= Madecastalia =

Madecastalia albignaci

Scientific classification
- Kingdom: Animalia
- Phylum: Arthropoda
- Class: Insecta
- Order: Coleoptera
- Suborder: Polyphaga
- Infraorder: Elateriformia
- Family: Buprestidae
- Genus: Madecastalia; Descarpentries, 1975
- Species: M. albignaci

Binomial name
- Madecastalia albignaci Descarpentries, 1975

Genus of beetles

Madecastalia albignaci is a species of beetle in the family Buprestidae, the only species in the genus Madecastalia.
