= Agenjosiana =

Agenjosiana manni

Scientific classification
- Kingdom: Animalia
- Phylum: Arthropoda
- Class: Insecta
- Order: Coleoptera
- Suborder: Polyphaga
- Infraorder: Elateriformia
- Family: Buprestidae
- Genus: Agenjosiana; Cobos, 1981
- Species: A. manni

Binomial name
- Agenjosiana manni (Fisher, 1925)

Genus of beetles

Agenjosiana manni is a species of beetles in the family Buprestidae, the only species in the genus Agenjosiana.
