= Bilyesta =

Bilyesta dactylozoides

Scientific classification
- Kingdom: Animalia
- Phylum: Arthropoda
- Class: Insecta
- Order: Coleoptera
- Suborder: Polyphaga
- Infraorder: Elateriformia
- Family: Buprestidae
- Genus: Bilyesta; Bellamy, 1999
- Species: B. dactylozoides

Binomial name
- Bilyesta dactylozoides (Bellamy, 1998)

Genus of beetles

Bilyesta dactylozoides is a species of beetles in the family Buprestidae, the only species in the genus Bilyesta.
