= Neocypetes =

Scientific classification
- Kingdom: Animalia
- Phylum: Arthropoda
- Class: Insecta
- Order: Coleoptera
- Suborder: Polyphaga
- Infraorder: Elateriformia
- Family: Buprestidae
- Genus: Neocypetes; Cobos, 1973

Genus of beetles

Neocypetes is a genus of beetles in the family Buprestidae, containing the following species:

- Neocypetes compactus (Berg, 1889)
- Neocypetes guttulatus (Farimaire & Germain, 1858)
- Neocypetes lethierryi (Thery, 1896)
