= Cobosesta =

Cobosesta mandli

Scientific classification
- Kingdom: Animalia
- Phylum: Arthropoda
- Class: Insecta
- Order: Coleoptera
- Suborder: Polyphaga
- Infraorder: Elateriformia
- Family: Buprestidae
- Genus: Cobosesta; Holm, 1982
- Species: C. mandli

Binomial name
- Cobosesta mandli (Cobos, 1981)

Genus of beetles

Cobosesta mandli is a species of beetles in the family Buprestidae, the only species in the genus Cobosesta.
