= Pseudocastalia =

Scientific classification
- Kingdom: Animalia
- Phylum: Arthropoda
- Class: Insecta
- Order: Coleoptera
- Suborder: Polyphaga
- Infraorder: Elateriformia
- Family: Buprestidae
- Genus: Pseudocastalia; Kraatz, 1896

Genus of beetles

Pseudocastalia is a genus of beetles in the family Buprestidae, containing the following species:

- Pseudocastalia arabica (Gestro, 1877)
- Pseudocastalia bennigseni Kraatz, 1896
- Pseudocastalia mattheei Holm, 1982
- Pseudocastalia penrithae Holm, 1982
