= Neopolycesta =

Scientific classification
- Kingdom: Animalia
- Phylum: Arthropoda
- Class: Insecta
- Order: Coleoptera
- Suborder: Polyphaga
- Infraorder: Elateriformia
- Family: Buprestidae
- Genus: Neopolycesta; Kerremans, 1906

Genus of beetles

Neopolycesta is a genus of beetles in the family Buprestidae, containing the following species:

- Neopolycesta caffra (Thunberg, 1787)
- Neopolycesta inornata (Peringuey, 1888)
- Neopolycesta kerremansella Obenberger, 1931
