= Thurntaxisia =

Scientific classification
- Kingdom: Animalia
- Phylum: Arthropoda
- Class: Insecta
- Order: Coleoptera
- Suborder: Polyphaga
- Infraorder: Elateriformia
- Family: Buprestidae
- Genus: Thurntaxisia; Schatzmayr, 1929

Genus of beetles

Thurntaxisia is a genus of beetles in the family Buprestidae, containing the following species:

- Thurntaxisia alexandri Schatzmayr, 1929
- Thurntaxisia cottyi (Fairmairei, 1866)
- Thurntaxisia schoemani (Holm, 1982)
