= Ocypetes =

Scientific classification
- Kingdom: Animalia
- Phylum: Arthropoda
- Class: Insecta
- Order: Coleoptera
- Suborder: Polyphaga
- Infraorder: Elateriformia
- Family: Buprestidae
- Genus: Ocypetes; Saunders, 1871

Genus of beetles

Ocypetes is a genus of beetles in the family Buprestidae, containing the following species:

- Ocypetes crassicollis (Laporte & Gory, 1837)
- Ocypetes descarpentriesi (Cobos, 1973)
- Ocypetes golbachi (Cobos, 1973)
- Ocypetes irroratus (Gory, 1840)

== Appearance ==
Medium-sized, usually matte, dark. The secondary covering wings are pulled out to a "tail" behind.

== Habits ==
The adult beetles like to visit flowers similar to most other species of beetles.

== Prevalence ==
The genus lives in southern South America (specifically Argentina).
