= Prospheres =

Scientific classification
- Kingdom: Animalia
- Phylum: Arthropoda
- Class: Insecta
- Order: Coleoptera
- Suborder: Polyphaga
- Infraorder: Elateriformia
- Family: Buprestidae
- Genus: Prospheres; Saunders, 1868

Genus of beetles

Prospheres is a genus of beetles in the family Buprestidae, containing the following species:

- Prospheres alternecostata Levey, 1978
- Prospheres aurantiopicta (Laporte & Gory, 1837)
- Prospheres chrysocoma Fauvel, 1891
- Prospheres norfolkensis Levey, 1978
