= Polycestaxis =

Polycestaxis carinicollis

Scientific classification
- Kingdom: Animalia
- Phylum: Arthropoda
- Class: Insecta
- Order: Coleoptera
- Suborder: Polyphaga
- Infraorder: Elateriformia
- Family: Buprestidae
- Genus: Polycestaxis; Obenberger, 1920
- Species: P. carinicollis

Binomial name
- Polycestaxis carinicollis Obenberger, 1920

Genus of beetles

Polycestaxis carinicollis is a species of beetles in the family Buprestidae, the only species in the genus Polycestaxis.
