= Neomastogenius =

Neomastogenius hatayamai

Scientific classification
- Kingdom: Animalia
- Phylum: Arthropoda
- Class: Insecta
- Order: Coleoptera
- Suborder: Polyphaga
- Infraorder: Elateriformia
- Family: Buprestidae
- Genus: Neomastogenius; Toyama, 1983
- Species: N. hatayamai

Binomial name
- Neomastogenius hatayamai Toyama, 1983

Genus of beetles

Neomastogenius hatayamai is a species of beetles in the family Buprestidae, the only species in the genus Neomastogenius.
