= Micrasta =

Scientific classification
- Kingdom: Animalia
- Phylum: Arthropoda
- Class: Insecta
- Order: Coleoptera
- Suborder: Polyphaga
- Infraorder: Elateriformia
- Family: Buprestidae
- Genus: Micrasta; Kerremans, 1893

Genus of beetles

Micrasta is a genus of beetles in the family Buprestidae, containing the following species:

- Micrasta alvarengai Cobos, 1959
- Micrasta amplithorax Kerremans, 1893
- Micrasta bucki Cobos, 1961
- Micrasta creola Obenberger, 1936
- Micrasta cubensis Fisher, 1930
- Micrasta cyanipennis Kerremans, 1893
- Micrasta fisheri Théry, 1927
- Micrasta gyleki Obenberger, 1917
- Micrasta hispaniolae Fisher, 1940
- Micrasta meligethoides Kerremans, 1893
- Micrasta minuta Kerremans, 1896
- Micrasta monticola Fisher, 1940
- Micrasta negrei Cobos, 1961
- Micrasta oakleyi Fisher, 1935
- Micrasta ornata Fisher, 1935
- Micrasta parallela Kerremans, 1896
- Micrasta peruviana Fisher, 1949
- Micrasta puertoricensis Fisher, 1940
- Micrasta pygmaeola Obenberger, 1917
- Micrasta strandi Obenberger, 1936
- Micrasta subcylindrica Fisher, 1940
- Micrasta typica Kerremans, 1893
- Micrasta uniformis (Waterhouse, 1896)
- Micrasta viridis Kerremans, 1896
