= Odettea =

Odettea laosensis

Scientific classification
- Kingdom: Animalia
- Phylum: Arthropoda
- Class: Insecta
- Order: Coleoptera
- Suborder: Polyphaga
- Infraorder: Elateriformia
- Family: Buprestidae
- Genus: Odettea; Baudon, 1966
- Species: O. laosensis

Binomial name
- Odettea laosensis Baudon, 1966

Species of beetle

Odettea laosensis is a species of beetle in the family Buprestidae, the only species in the genus Odettea.
