= Polycestoides =

Scientific classification
- Kingdom: Animalia
- Phylum: Arthropoda
- Class: Insecta
- Order: Coleoptera
- Suborder: Polyphaga
- Infraorder: Elateriformia
- Family: Buprestidae
- Genus: Polycestoides; Kerremans, 1902

Genus of beetles

Polycestoides is a genus of beetles in the family Buprestidae, containing the following species:

- Polycestoides chrysis Kerremans, 1902
- Polycestoides nishimawai Toyama, 1985
