= Cochinchinula =

Scientific classification
- Kingdom: Animalia
- Phylum: Arthropoda
- Class: Insecta
- Order: Coleoptera
- Suborder: Polyphaga
- Infraorder: Elateriformia
- Family: Buprestidae
- Genus: Cochinchinula; Volkovitsh, 1984

Genus of beetles

Cochinchinula is a genus of beetles in the family Buprestidae, containing the following species:

- Cochinchinula bilyi Volkovitsh, 2008
- Cochinchinula quadriareolata (Obenberger, 1924)
- Cochinchinula thailandica Volkovitsh, 2008
