= Paracmaeoderoides =

Paracmaeoderoides callyntromorion

Scientific classification
- Kingdom: Animalia
- Phylum: Arthropoda
- Class: Insecta
- Order: Coleoptera
- Suborder: Polyphaga
- Infraorder: Elateriformia
- Family: Buprestidae
- Genus: Paracmaeoderoides; Bellamy & Westcott, 1996
- Species: P. callyntromorion

Binomial name
- Paracmaeoderoides callyntromorion Bellamy & Westcott, 1996

Genus of beetles

Paracmaeoderoides callyntromorion is a species of beetles in the family Buprestidae, the only species in the genus Paracmaeoderoides.
