= Anambodera =

Scientific classification
- Kingdom: Animalia
- Phylum: Arthropoda
- Class: Insecta
- Order: Coleoptera
- Suborder: Polyphaga
- Infraorder: Elateriformia
- Family: Buprestidae
- Subtribe: Acmaeoderina
- Genus: Anambodera; Barr, 1974

Genus of beetles

Anambodera is a genus of beetles in the family Buprestidae, containing the following species:

- Anambodera clarki Westcott, 2001
- Anambodera gemina (Horn, 1878)
- Anambodera lucernae (Knull, 1973)
- Anambodera lucksani Walters, 1982
- Anambodera nebulosa (Horn, 1894)
- Anambodera palmarum (Timberlake, 1939)
- Anambodera santarosae (Knull, 1960)
