= Exaesthetus =

Exaesthetus dastyoides

Scientific classification
- Kingdom: Animalia
- Phylum: Arthropoda
- Class: Insecta
- Order: Coleoptera
- Suborder: Polyphaga
- Infraorder: Elateriformia
- Family: Buprestidae
- Genus: Exaesthetus; Waterhouse, 1889
- Species: E. dastyoides

Binomial name
- Exaesthetus dastyoides Waterhouse, 1889

Genus of beetles

Exaesthetus dastyoides is a species of beetles in the family Buprestidae, the only species in the genus Exaesthetus.
