= Trigonogya =

Trigonogya reticulaticollis

Scientific classification
- Kingdom: Animalia
- Phylum: Arthropoda
- Class: Insecta
- Order: Coleoptera
- Suborder: Polyphaga
- Infraorder: Elateriformia
- Family: Buprestidae
- Genus: Trigonogya; Schaeffer, 1919
- Species: T. reticulaticollis

Binomial name
- Trigonogya reticulaticollis (Schaeffer, 1904)

Genus of beetles

Trigonogya reticulaticollis is a species of beetles in the family Buprestidae, the only species in the genus Trigonogya.
