= Ankareus =

Scientific classification
- Kingdom: Animalia
- Phylum: Arthropoda
- Class: Insecta
- Order: Coleoptera
- Suborder: Polyphaga
- Infraorder: Elateriformia
- Family: Buprestidae
- Genus: Ankareus; Kerremans, 1894

Genus of beetles

Ankareus is a genus of beetles in the family Buprestidae, containing the following species:

- Ankareus aeneus Kerremans, 1894
- Ankareus afer (Holynski, 1993)
- Ankareus alluaudi Kerremans, 1914
- Ankareus ashanti (Holynski, 1993)
- Ankareus capensis Bellamy, 1987
- Ankareus ceylonicus (Holynski, 1984)
- Ankareus cyanicollis Kerremans, 1894
- Ankareus felix (Waterhouse, 1896)
- Ankareus gomyi Descarpentries, 1973
- Ankareus indicus (Holynski, 1984)
- Ankareus kenyensis Bellamy, 1991
- Ankareus luciphilus Bílý, Curletti & Van Harten, 2003
- Ankareus mameti Descarpentries, 1973
- Ankareus mascarenicus Lesne, 1918
- Ankareus micrastoides (Théry, 1912)
- Ankareus natalensis Bellamy, 1987
- Ankareus opacus (Théry, 1912)
- Ankareus ruficornis Théry, 1912
- Ankareus rufitarsis (Théry, 1912)
- Ankareus somalicus Bellamy, 1991
- Ankareus subcyaneus Kerremans, 1894
- Ankareus tenebrosus (Fairmaire, 1901)
- Ankareus transvaalensis Bellamy, 1991
- Ankareus tristis (Théry, 1909)
- Ankareus tsavoensis Bellamy, 1991
- Ankareus vinsoni Descarpentries, 1973
