= Nothomorpha =

Scientific classification
- Kingdom: Animalia
- Phylum: Arthropoda
- Class: Insecta
- Order: Coleoptera
- Suborder: Polyphaga
- Infraorder: Elateriformia
- Family: Buprestidae
- Genus: Nothomorpha; Saunders, 1871

Genus of beetles

Nothomorpha is a genus of beetles in the family Buprestidae, containing the following species:

- Nothomorpha latifrons Holm, 1976
- Nothomorpha major Kerremans, 1899
- Nothomorpha minima Kerremans, 1899
- Nothomorpha pauperata Thomson, 1878
- Nothomorpha rudis (Wiedemann, 1821)
- Nothomorpha rugosa (Thunberg, 1787)
- Nothomorpha verrucosa (Gory & Laporte, 1839)
