= Brachmaeodera =

Brachmaeodera tantilla

Scientific classification
- Kingdom: Animalia
- Phylum: Arthropoda
- Class: Insecta
- Order: Coleoptera
- Suborder: Polyphaga
- Infraorder: Elateriformia
- Family: Buprestidae
- Genus: Brachmaeodera; Volkovitsh & Bellamy, 1992
- Species: B. tantilla

Binomial name
- Brachmaeodera tantilla (Kerremans, 1907)

Genus of beetles

Brachmaeodera tantilla is a species of beetles in the family Buprestidae, the only species in the genus Brachmaeodera.
