= Xantheremia =

Scientific classification
- Kingdom: Animalia
- Phylum: Arthropoda
- Class: Insecta
- Order: Coleoptera
- Suborder: Polyphaga
- Infraorder: Elateriformia
- Family: Buprestidae
- Genus: Xantheremia; Volkovitsh, 1979

Genus of beetles

Xantheremia is a genus of beetles in the family Buprestidae, containing the following species:

- Xantheremia brancsiki (Obenberger, 1935)
- Xantheremia chivensis (Volkovitsh, 1978)
- Xantheremia convoluta (Klug, 1829)
- Xantheremia fasciata (Roth, 1851)
- Xantheremia flavipennis (Klug, 1829)
- Xantheremia freidbergi Volkovitsh, 2004
- Xantheremia jelineki Bílý, 1983
- Xantheremia kaplini Volkovitsh, 1984
- Xantheremia koenigi (Ganglbauer, 1888)
- Xantheremia mazandaranica (Bílý, 1983)
- Xantheremia pantherina (Bílý, 1979)
- Xantheremia philistina (Marseul, 1866)
- Xantheremia steinbergi (Volkovitsh, 1978)
- Xantheremia straminea (Abeille de Perrin, 1895)
- Xantheremia volkovitshi Bílý, 1983
