= Microacmaeodera =

Scientific classification
- Kingdom: Animalia
- Phylum: Arthropoda
- Class: Insecta
- Order: Coleoptera
- Suborder: Polyphaga
- Infraorder: Elateriformia
- Family: Buprestidae
- Genus: Microacmaeodera; Cobos, 1966

Genus of beetles

Microacmaeodera is a genus of beetles in the family Buprestidae, containing the following species:

- Microacmaeodera aruensis (Théry, 1923)
- Microacmaeodera belli (Kerremans, 1893)
- Microacmaeodera cuneiformis Volkovitsh, 2007
- Microacmaeodera grootaerti Holynski, 1995
- Microacmaeodera kubani Volkovitsh & Bellamy, 1995
- Microacmaeodera kucerai Volkovitsh, 2007
- Microacmaeodera longicornis (Cobos, 1966)
- Microacmaeodera macgregori Bellamy & Volkovitsh, 1992
- Microacmaeodera ohmomoi Volkovitsh, 2007
- Microacmaeodera rolciki Volkovitsh, 2007
- Microacmaeodera thailandica Volkovitsh & Bellamy, 1995
- Microacmaeodera wittmeri Volkovitsh, 1986
