= Helferella =

Scientific classification
- Kingdom: Animalia
- Phylum: Arthropoda
- Class: Insecta
- Order: Coleoptera
- Suborder: Polyphaga
- Infraorder: Elateriformia
- Family: Buprestidae
- Genus: Helferella; Cobos, 1957

Genus of beetles

Helferella is a genus of beetles in the family Buprestidae, containing the following species:

- Helferella abbreviata (Carter, 1926)
- Helferella dianae Cobos, 1957
- Helferella elata (Carter, 1926)
- Helferella fiji Bellamy, 1991
- Helferella frenchi (Théry, 1928)
- Helferella gothmogoides, named after Gothmog of The Lord of the Rings Williams & Weir, 1988
- Helferella macalpinei Williams & Weir, 1987
- Helferella manningensis Williams & Weir, 1987
- Helferella miyal Williams & Weir, 1987
- Helferella oborili Bílý & Nakládal, 2010
- Helferella papuae Bellamy, 1991
- Helferella philippinensis Bellamy, 1991
- Helferella tolgae Williams & Weir, 1988
- Helferella vanuae Bellamy, 1991
- Helferella viti Bellamy, 1991
- Helferella webbensis Williams & Weir, 1987
