= Xenopsis =

Scientific classification
- Kingdom: Animalia
- Phylum: Arthropoda
- Class: Insecta
- Order: Coleoptera
- Suborder: Polyphaga
- Infraorder: Elateriformia
- Family: Buprestidae
- Genus: Xenopsis; Saunders, 1867

Genus of beetles

Xenopsis is a genus of beetles in the family Buprestidae, containing the following species:

- Xenopsis akiyamai Volkovitsh, 2009
- Xenopsis boschmai Thery, 1935
- Xenopsis kubani Volkovitsh, 2009
- Xenopsis laevis Saunders, 1867
- Xenopsis pacholatkoi Volkovitsh, 2008
- Xenopsis violaceocyanea Volkovitsh, 2008
- Xenopsis woodleyi Volkovitsh, 2008
