= Thaichinula =

Thaichinula ohmomoi

Scientific classification
- Kingdom: Animalia
- Phylum: Arthropoda
- Class: Insecta
- Order: Coleoptera
- Suborder: Polyphaga
- Infraorder: Elateriformia
- Family: Buprestidae
- Genus: Thaichinula; Volkovitsh, 2008
- Species: T. ohmomoi

Binomial name
- Thaichinula ohmomoi Volkovitsh, 2008

Genus of beetles

Thaichinula ohmomoi is a species of beetle in the family Buprestidae, the only species in the genus Thaichinula.
