= Siamastogenius =

Siamastogenius cyaneus

Scientific classification
- Kingdom: Animalia
- Phylum: Arthropoda
- Class: Insecta
- Order: Coleoptera
- Suborder: Polyphaga
- Infraorder: Elateriformia
- Family: Buprestidae
- Genus: Siamastogenius; Toyama, 1983
- Species: S. cyaneus

Binomial name
- Siamastogenius cyaneus Toyama, 1983

Genus of beetles

Siamastogenius cyaneus is a species of beetles in the family Buprestidae, the only species in the genus Siamastogenius.
