= Atacamita =

Scientific classification
- Kingdom: Animalia
- Phylum: Arthropoda
- Class: Insecta
- Order: Coleoptera
- Suborder: Polyphaga
- Infraorder: Elateriformia
- Family: Buprestidae
- Genus: Atacamita; Moore, 1985

Genus of beetles

Atacamita is a genus of beetles in the family Buprestidae, containing the following species:

- Atacamita arriagadai Moore, 2001
- Atacamita biimpressa (Philippi & Philippi, 1860)
- Atacamita chiliensis (Laporte & Gory, 1835)
