= Theryola =

Theryola touzalini

Scientific classification
- Kingdom: Animalia
- Phylum: Arthropoda
- Class: Insecta
- Order: Coleoptera
- Suborder: Polyphaga
- Infraorder: Elateriformia
- Family: Buprestidae
- Genus: Theryola; Nelson, 1997
- Species: T. touzalini

Binomial name
- Theryola touzalini (Thery, 1923)

Genus of beetles

Theryola touzalini is a species of beetles in the family Buprestidae, the only species in the genus Theryola.
