= Pseudotrigonogya =

Scientific classification
- Kingdom: Animalia
- Phylum: Arthropoda
- Class: Insecta
- Order: Coleoptera
- Suborder: Polyphaga
- Infraorder: Elateriformia
- Family: Buprestidae
- Genus: Pseudotrigonogya; Manley, 1986

Genus of beetles

Pseudotrigonogya is a genus of beetles in the family Buprestidae, containing the following species:

- Pseudotrigonogya ecuadorensis Manley, 1986
- Pseudotrigonogya insularis (Fisher, 1949)
- Pseudotrigonogya obscurinegro Manley, 1986
- Pseudotrigonogya valdenbroi Manley, 1986
