= Namibogenius =

Namibogenius confusus

Scientific classification
- Kingdom: Animalia
- Phylum: Arthropoda
- Class: Insecta
- Order: Coleoptera
- Suborder: Polyphaga
- Infraorder: Elateriformia
- Family: Buprestidae
- Genus: Namibogenius; Bellamy, 1996
- Species: N. confusus

Binomial name
- Namibogenius confusus Bellamy, 1996

Genus of beetles

Namibogenius confusus is a species of beetles in the family Buprestidae, the only species in the genus Namibogenius.
