= A. amabilis =

A. amabilis is a scientific abbreviation. It may refer to one of the following species:

== Insects ==
- Acanthoscelides amabilis, a leaf beetle
- Achmonia amabilis, an insect
- Acmaeodera amabilis, a beetle
- Acrolocha amabilis, a beetle
- Aedes amabilis, a mosquito
- Afrosphinx amabilis, a moth
- Amblystomus amabilis, a beetle
- America amabilis, a beetle
- Amphicnemis amabilis, a damselfly
- Anajapyx amabilis, a bristletail
- Anomopsocus amabilis, a barklouse
- Aphaena amabilis, a lanternbug
- Aptenoperissus amabilis, an extinct species of wasp
- Astylus amabilis, an insect
- Asura amabilis, a moth
- Austroargiolestes amabilis, a damselfly
- Austrocardiophorus amabilis, a beetle

== Spiders ==
- Alcmena amabilis, a jumping spider
- Araneus amabilis, a spider
- Asceua amabilis, an ant spider

== Other animals ==
- Amazilia amabilis, the blue-crested hummingbird
- Aretopsis amabilis, a shrimp
- Aretopsis amabilis, a shrimp
- Auriglobus amabilis, a pufferfish

== Plants ==
- Abies amabilis, a fir
- Alstroemeria amabilis, a plant
- Arachniodes amabilis, a plant
- Aristida amabilis, a synonym of Stipagrostis amabilis, a grass
- Asclepias amabilis, a plant
