= Parajapyx unidentatus =

Scientific classification
- Domain: Eukaryota
- Kingdom: Animalia
- Phylum: Arthropoda
- Order: Diplura
- Family: Parajapygidae
- Genus: Parajapyx
- Species: P. unidentatus

Binomial name
- Parajapyx unidentatus (Ewing, 1941)

Species of two-pronged bristletail

Parajapyx unidentatus is a species of two-pronged bristletail in the family Parajapygidae. It is found in North America.
