= Symphylurinus almedai =

Scientific classification
- Domain: Eukaryota
- Kingdom: Animalia
- Phylum: Arthropoda
- Order: Diplura
- Family: Projapygidae
- Genus: Symphylurinus
- Species: S. almedai

Binomial name
- Symphylurinus almedai Wygodzinsky, 1946

Species of two-pronged bristletail

Symphylurinus almedai is a species of two-pronged bristletail in the family Projapygidae.
