= Parajapyx intermedius =

Scientific classification
- Domain: Eukaryota
- Kingdom: Animalia
- Phylum: Arthropoda
- Order: Diplura
- Family: Parajapygidae
- Genus: Parajapyx
- Species: P. intermedius

Binomial name
- Parajapyx intermedius Silvestri, 1948

Species of two-pronged bristletail

Parajapyx intermedius is a species of two-pronged bristletail in the family Parajapygidae. It is found in Central America.
