= Parajapyx isabellae =

Scientific classification
- Domain: Eukaryota
- Kingdom: Animalia
- Phylum: Arthropoda
- Order: Diplura
- Family: Parajapygidae
- Genus: Parajapyx
- Species: P. isabellae

Binomial name
- Parajapyx isabellae (Grassi, 1886)

Species of two-pronged bristletail

Parajapyx isabellae is a species of two-pronged bristletail in the family Parajapygidae. It is found in Africa, Europe and Northern Asia (excluding China), North America, Oceania, South America, and Southern Asia.

== Subspecies ==
These two subspecies belong to the species Parajapyx isabellae:

- Parajapyx isabellae azteca Silvestri, 1948
- Parajapyx isabellae isabellae (Grassi, 1886)
