= Projapyx imperfectus =

Scientific classification
- Domain: Eukaryota
- Kingdom: Animalia
- Phylum: Arthropoda
- Order: Diplura
- Family: Projapygidae
- Genus: Projapyx
- Species: P. imperfectus

Binomial name
- Projapyx imperfectus Pages, 1958

Species of two-pronged bristletail

Projapyx imperfectus is a species of two-pronged bristletail in the family Projapygidae.
