= Parajapyx pauliani =

Scientific classification
- Domain: Eukaryota
- Kingdom: Animalia
- Phylum: Arthropoda
- Order: Diplura
- Family: Parajapygidae
- Genus: Parajapyx
- Species: P. pauliani

Binomial name
- Parajapyx pauliani Pages, 1959

Species of two-pronged bristletail

Parajapyx pauliani is a species of two-pronged bristletail in the family Parajapygidae.
