= Bronze pufferfish =

Bronze pufferfish or bronze puffer may refer to two southeast Asian species of fish:

- Auriglobus modestus
- Chonerhinos naritus
