= Parajapyx emeryanus =

Scientific classification
- Kingdom: Animalia
- Phylum: Arthropoda
- Class: Entognatha
- Order: Diplura
- Family: Parajapygidae
- Genus: Parajapyx
- Species: P. emeryanus

Binomial name
- Parajapyx emeryanus Silvestri, 1928

Species of two-pronged bristletail

Parajapyx emeryanus is a species of two-pronged bristletail in the family Parajapygidae.
