= Symphylurinus strangei =

Scientific classification
- Kingdom: Animalia
- Phylum: Arthropoda
- Class: Entognatha
- Order: Diplura
- Family: Projapygidae
- Genus: Symphylurinus
- Species: S. strangei

Binomial name
- Symphylurinus strangei Smith, 1960

Species of two-pronged bristletail

Symphylurinus strangei is a species of two-pronged bristletail in the family Projapygidae. It is found in Central America.
