= Ectasjapyx =

Scientific classification
- Kingdom: Animalia
- Phylum: Arthropoda
- Class: Entognatha
- Order: Diplura
- Family: Japygidae
- Genus: Ectasjapyx; Silvestri, 1929

Genus of two-pronged bristletails

Ectasjapyx is a genus of diplurans in the family Parajapygidae.

== Species ==
- Ectasjapyx bolivari Silvestri, 1929
- Ectasjapyx machadoi Pagés, 1952
- Ectasjapyx microdontus Pagés, 1952
- Ectasjapyx simulator Pagés, 1952
- Ectasjapyx vilhenai Pagés, 1952
