= Japygoidea =

Scientific classification
- Kingdom: Animalia
- Phylum: Arthropoda
- Clade: Pancrustacea
- Class: Entognatha
- Order: Diplura
- Suborder: Dicellurata; Cook, 1896
- Superfamily: Japygoidea; Lubbock, 1873

Superfamily of arthropods

Dicellurata is a suborder of two-pronged bristletails in the order Diplura. There are at least 4 families and more than 170 described species in Dicellurata. Japygoidea is the only superfamily in the suborder.

== Families ==
These four families belong to the suborder Dicellurata:

- Dinjapygidae Womersley, 1939
- Heterojapygidae
- Japygidae Lubbock, 1873 (forcepstails)
- Parajapygidae Womersley, 1939
- †Sinojapygidae Wang, Cai, Sánchez-García, Sendra and Huang, 2026
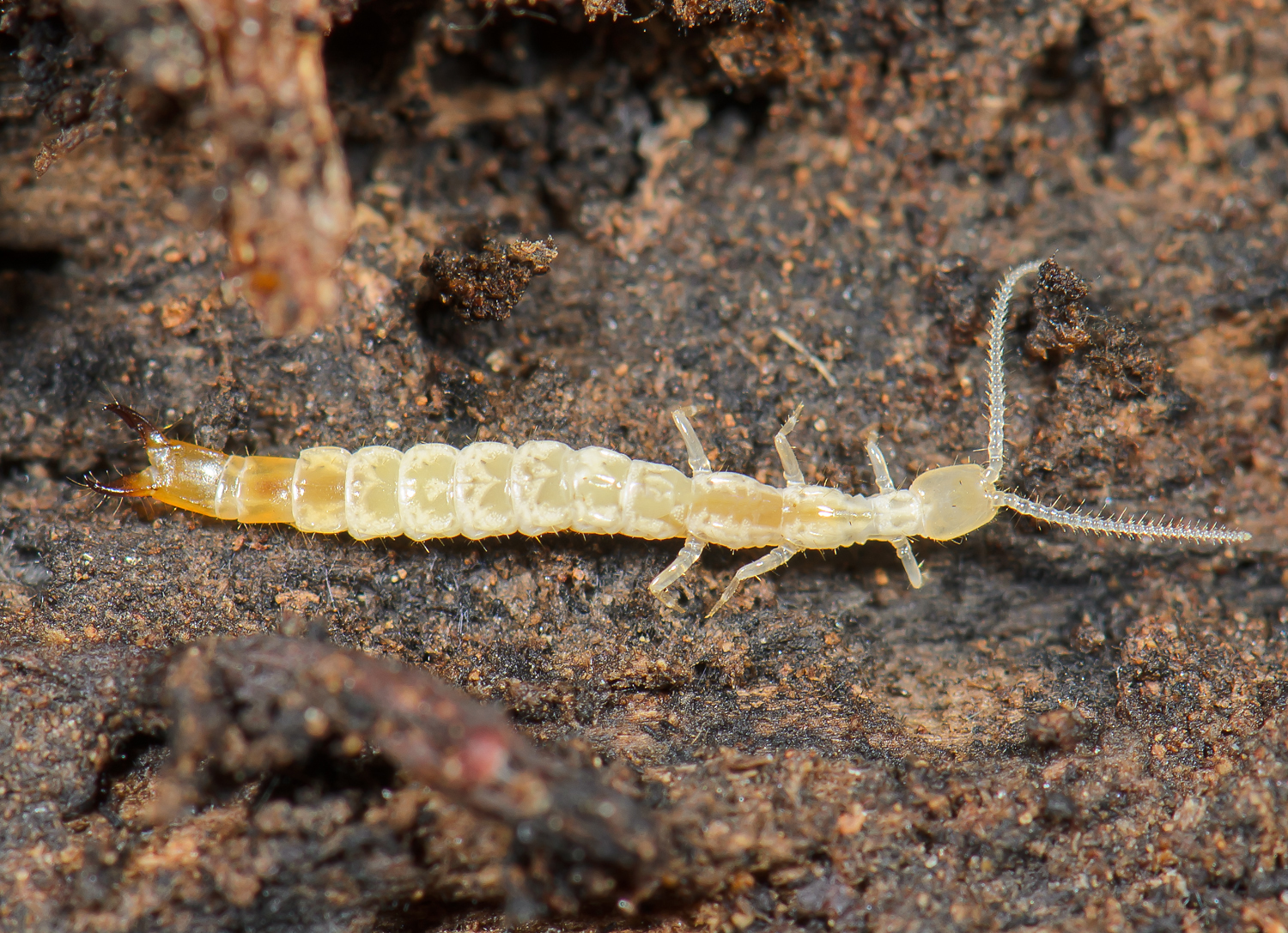
Japygidae

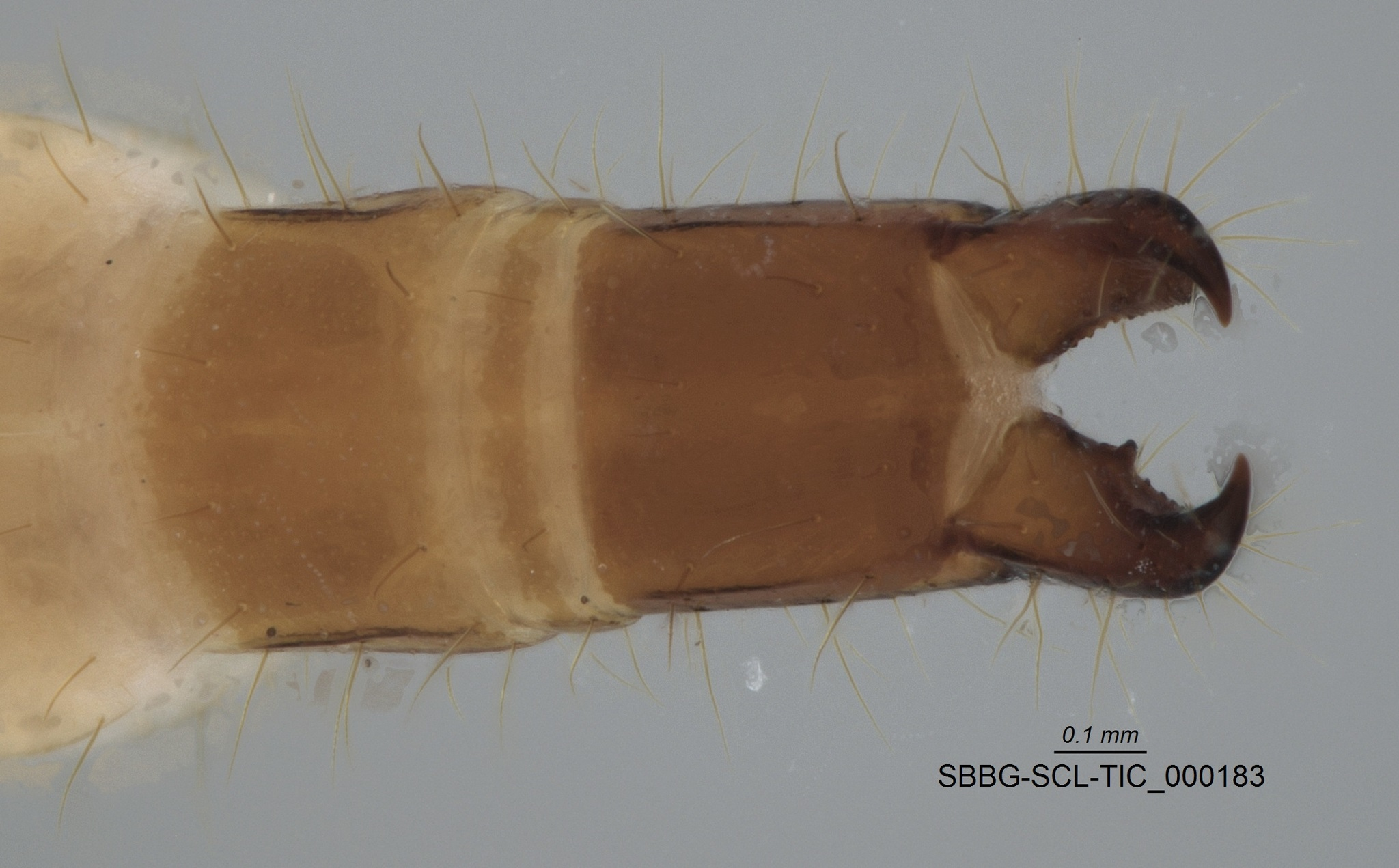
Characteristic cerci of Japygoidea
