= Parajapyx =

Scientific classification
- Domain: Eukaryota
- Kingdom: Animalia
- Phylum: Arthropoda
- Order: Diplura
- Family: Parajapygidae
- Genus: Parajapyx; Silvestri, 1903

Genus of two-pronged bristletails

Parajapyx is a genus of diplurans in the family Parajapygidae.

== Species ==
- Parajapyx adisi Pagés, 2000
- Parajapyx alienus Pagés, 1982
- Parajapyx bonetianus Silvestri, 1948
- Parajapyx botosaneanui Pagés, 1975
- Parajapyx calvinianus Silvestri, 1929
- Parajapyx condei Pagés, 1953
- Parajapyx dorianus Silvestri, 1929
- Parajapyx emeryanus Silvestri, 1928
- Parajapyx feaianus Silvestri, 1929
- Parajapyx genavensium Pagés, 1977
- Parajapyx gerlachi Pagés, 1967
- Parajapyx gestrianus Silvestri, 1929
- Parajapyx hauseri Pagés, 1998
- Parajapyx intermedius Silvestri, 1948
- Parajapyx isabellae (Grassi, 1886)
- Parajapyx kocheri Pagés, 1953
- Parajapyx normandi Pagés, 1952
- Parajapyx paucidentis Xie, Yang & Yin, 1990
- Parajapyx pauliani Pagés, 1959
- Parajapyx remyi Pagés, 1953
- Parajapyx strinatii Pagés, 1975
- Parajapyx swani Womersley, 1934
- Parajapyx tristanianus Silvestri, 1929
- Parajapyx unidentatus (Ewing, 1941)
