= Heterojapyx gallardi =

Scientific classification
- Domain: Eukaryota
- Kingdom: Animalia
- Phylum: Arthropoda
- Order: Diplura
- Family: Heterojapygidae
- Genus: Heterojapyx
- Species: H. gallardi

Binomial name
- Heterojapyx gallardi Tillyard, 1924

Species of two-pronged bristletail

Heterojapyx gallardi is a species of two-pronged bristletail in the family Heterojapygidae.
