= Dinjapyx rossi =

Scientific classification
- Domain: Eukaryota
- Kingdom: Animalia
- Phylum: Arthropoda
- Order: Diplura
- Family: Dinjapygidae
- Genus: Dinjapyx
- Species: D. rossi

Binomial name
- Dinjapyx rossi Smith, 1959

Species of two-pronged bristletail

Dinjapyx rossi is a species of two-pronged bristletail in the family Dinjapygidae.
