= Biclavula =

Scientific classification
- Domain: Eukaryota
- Kingdom: Animalia
- Phylum: Arthropoda
- Order: Diplura
- Family: Projapygidae
- Genus: Biclavula; San Martín, 1963

Genus of two-pronged bristletails

Biclavula is a genus of diplurans in the family Projapygidae.

== Species ==
- Biclavula wygodzinskyi San Martín, 1963
