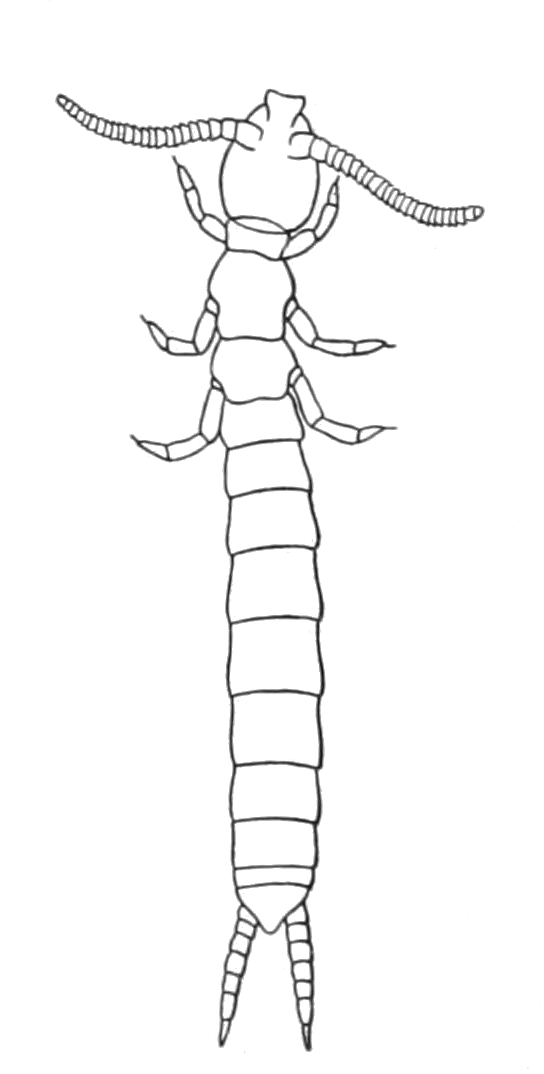
- Anajapyx vesiculosus

Scientific classification
- Domain: Eukaryota
- Kingdom: Animalia
- Phylum: Arthropoda
- Order: Diplura
- Family: Anajapygidae
- Genus: Anajapyx
- Species: A. vesiculosus

Binomial name
- Anajapyx vesiculosus Silvestri, 1903

= Anajapyx vesiculosus =

Species of two-pronged bristletail

Anajapyx vesiculosus is a species of two-pronged bristletail in the family Anajapygidae.
