= Golden puffer =

Golden puffer or golden pufferfish is a common name for several fishes and may refer to:

- Arothron meleagris, native to the Pacific and Indian oceans
- Auriglobus modestus, native to freshwater habitats in Southeast Asia
