= Grassjapyx =

Scientific classification
- Kingdom: Animalia
- Phylum: Arthropoda
- Class: Entognatha
- Order: Diplura
- Family: Parajapygidae
- Genus: Grassjapyx; Silvestri, 1903

Genus of two-pronged bristletails

Grassjapyx is a genus of diplurans in the family Parajapygidae.

== Species ==
- Grassjapyx afra (Silvestri, 1913)
- Grassjapyx ambiguus (Pagés, 1952)
- Grassjapyx bahianus (Silvestri, 1948)
- Grassjapyx birket-smithi (Pagés, 1958)
- Grassjapyx bolivarianus (Silvestri, 1929)
- Grassjapyx brasilianus (Silvestri, 1948)
- Grassjapyx chichinii (Pagés, 1953)
- Grassjapyx coiffaiti (Pagés, 1955)
- Grassjapyx dahli (Pagés, 1958)
- Grassjapyx dentata (Delamare-Deboutteville, 1947)
- Grassjapyx dissimilis (Pagés, 1953)
- Grassjapyx dundoanus (Pagés, 1952)
- Grassjapyx grandianus (Silvestri, 1929)
- Grassjapyx grassianus (Silvestri, 1911)
- Grassjapyx hwashanensis (Chou, 1966)
- Grassjapyx indica (Silvestri, 1913)
- Grassjapyx jinghongensis (Xie & Yang, 1990)
- Grassjapyx luachimoanus (Pagés, 1952)
- Grassjapyx mexicanus (Silvestri, 1948)
- Grassjapyx priesneri (Pagés, 1953)
- Grassjapyx queenslandica (Womersley, 1945)
- Grassjapyx reniformis (Pagés, 1998)
- Grassjapyx russianus (Silvestri, 1948)
- Grassjapyx sabahnus (Pagés, 1987)
- Grassjapyx samoanus (Silvestri, 1930)
- Grassjapyx scalpellus (Fox, 1941)
- Grassjapyx sensillatus (Pagés, 1954)
- Grassjapyx sepilok (Pagés, 1987)
- Grassjapyx temburong (Pagés, 1998)
- Grassjapyx vinciguerranus (Silvestri, 1929)
- Grassjapyx yangi (Chou, 1966)
