= Anajapyx menkei =

Scientific classification
- Kingdom: Animalia
- Phylum: Arthropoda
- Class: Entognatha
- Order: Diplura
- Family: Anajapygidae
- Genus: Anajapyx
- Species: A. menkei

Binomial name
- Anajapyx menkei Smith, 1960

Species of two-pronged bristletail

Anajapyx menkei is a species of two-pronged bristletail in the family Anajapygidae. It is found in Central America.
