= Auriglobus silus =

Conservation status
- Near Threatened (IUCN 3.1)

Scientific classification
- Kingdom: Animalia
- Phylum: Chordata
- Class: Actinopterygii
- Order: Tetraodontiformes
- Family: Tetraodontidae
- Genus: Auriglobus
- Species: A. silus

Binomial name
- Auriglobus silus (Roberts, 1982)
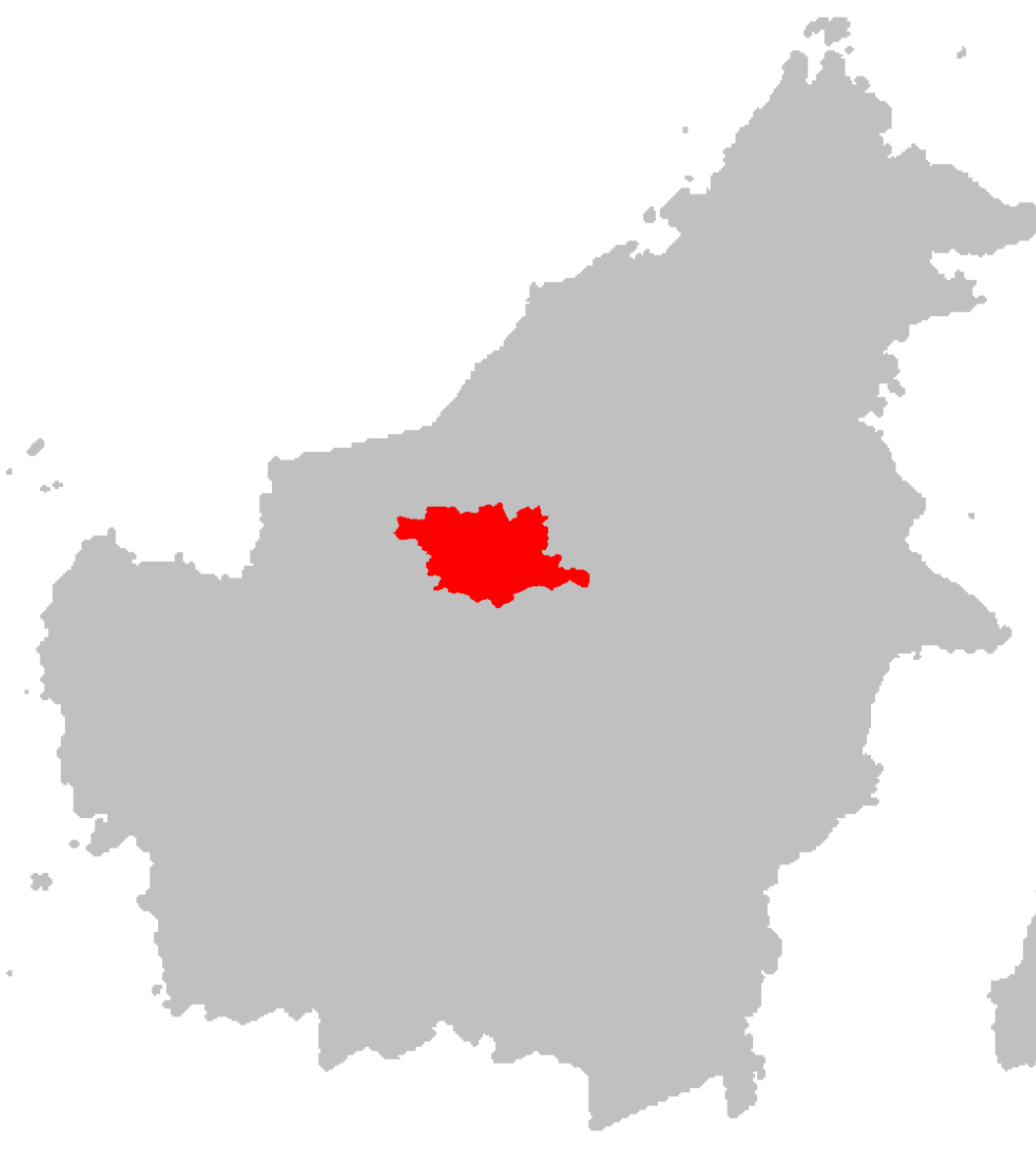

Synonyms
- Chonerhinos silus

Species of fish

Auriglobus silus is a species of pufferfish in the family Tetraodontidae. It is a tropical freshwater fish known only from Indonesia that reaches 8.2 cm (3.2 inches) SL. Like the other four members of Auriglobus, it was previously classified as a species of Chonerhinos.
