= Miojapyx =

Scientific classification
- Kingdom: Animalia
- Phylum: Arthropoda
- Class: Entognatha
- Order: Diplura
- Family: Parajapygidae
- Genus: Miojapyx; Ewing, 1941

Genus of two-pronged bristletails

Miojapyx is a genus of diplurans in the family Parajapygidae.

== Species ==
- Miojapyx americanus Ewing, 1941
