= Pentacladiscus =

Scientific classification
- Domain: Eukaryota
- Kingdom: Animalia
- Phylum: Arthropoda
- Order: Diplura
- Family: Projapygidae
- Genus: Pentacladiscus; San Martín, 1963

Genus of two-pronged bristletails

Pentacladiscus is a genus of diplurans in the family Projapygidae.

== Species ==
- Pentacladiscus manegarzoni San Martín, 1963
- Pentacladiscus schubarti San Martín, 1963
