= Symphylurinus =

Scientific classification
- Domain: Eukaryota
- Kingdom: Animalia
- Phylum: Arthropoda
- Order: Diplura
- Family: Projapygidae
- Genus: Symphylurinus; Silvestri, 1909

Genus of two-pronged bristletails

Symphylurinus is a genus of diplurans in the family Projapygidae.

== Species ==
- Symphylurinus almedai Wygodzinsky, 1946
- Symphylurinus antenofloridus San Martín, 1964
- Symphylurinus arlei Wygodzinsky, 1941
- Symphylurinus blanguernoni Pagés, 1951
- Symphylurinus carbonelli Mañé-Garzon & San Martín, 1960
- Symphylurinus cuelloi San Martín, 1962
- Symphylurinus dhiralankara Fernando, 1959
- Symphylurinus discretus Silvestri, 1938
- Symphylurinus fuquesi San Martín, 1967
- Symphylurinus grassi Silvestri, 1909
- Symphylurinus indicus Silvestri, 1937
- Symphylurinus kelanitissa Fernando, 1959
- Symphylurinus klappenbachi San Martín, 1962
- Symphylurinus legrandi Mañé-Garzon & San Martín, 1960
- Symphylurinus lutzi Silvestri, 1937
- Symphylurinus marcuzzii Pagés, 1955
- Symphylurinus monnei San Martín, 1966
- Symphylurinus monoglandularis San Martín & Sandulski, 1963
- Symphylurinus occidentalis Silvestri, 1938
- Symphylurinus orientalis Silvestri, 1937
- Symphylurinus palermi San Martín, 1967
- Symphylurinus paratus Silvestri, 1938
- Symphylurinus perceptus Silvestri, 1938
- Symphylurinus peregrinus Silvestri, 1938
- Symphylurinus remyi Pagés, 1953
- Symphylurinus simplex Silvestri, 1938
- Symphylurinus spinidentatus San Martín, 1966
- Symphylurinus strangei Smith, 1960
- Symphylurinus swani Womersley, 1945
- Symphylurinus travassosi Silvestri, 1938
- Symphylurinus tristani Silvestri, 1938
