= Projapyx =

Scientific classification
- Domain: Eukaryota
- Kingdom: Animalia
- Phylum: Arthropoda
- Order: Diplura
- Family: Projapygidae
- Genus: Projapyx; Cook, 1899

Genus of two-pronged bristletails

Projapyx is a genus of diplurans in the family Projapygidae.

== Species ==
- Projapyx brasiliensis Silvestri, 1938
- Projapyx congruens Silvestri, 1938
- Projapyx eburneus (Paulian & Delamare-Deboutteville, 1948)
- Projapyx imperfectus Pagés, 1958
- Projapyx incomprehensus Silvestri, 1909
- Projapyx jeanneli Delamare-Deboutteville, 1947
- Projapyx stylifer Cook, 1899
