= Auriglobus remotus =

Conservation status
- Data Deficient (IUCN 3.1)

Scientific classification
- Kingdom: Animalia
- Phylum: Chordata
- Class: Actinopterygii
- Order: Tetraodontiformes
- Family: Tetraodontidae
- Genus: Auriglobus
- Species: A. remotus

Binomial name
- Auriglobus remotus (Roberts, 1982)
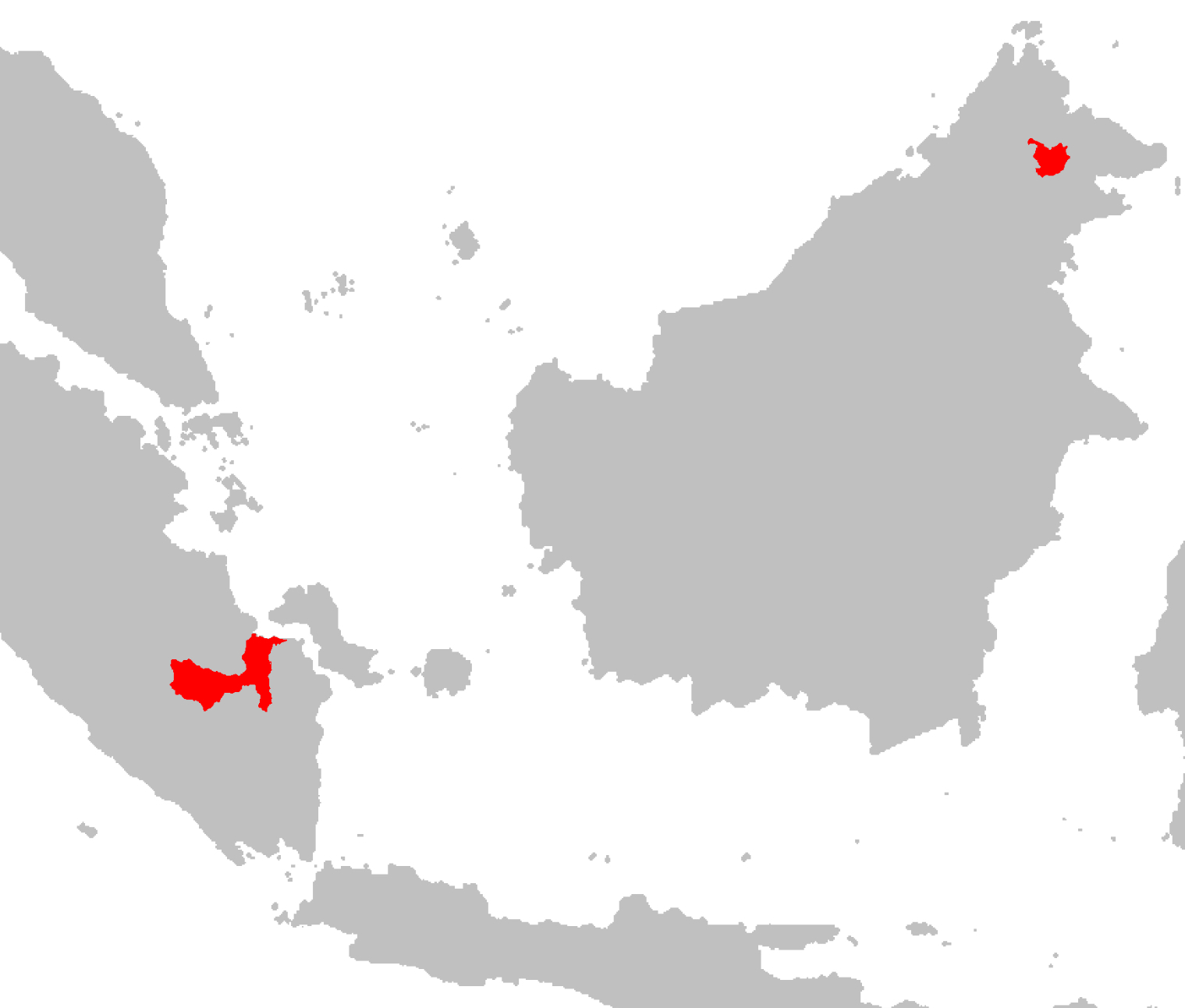

Synonyms
- Chonerhinos remotus

Species of fish

Auriglobus remotus is a species of pufferfish in the family Tetraodontidae. It is a tropical freshwater species known only from Indonesia that reaches 6.2 cm (2.4 inches) SL. Like the other four members of Auriglobus, it was previously classified in the genus Chonerhinos.
