= Auriglobus nefastus =

Conservation status
- Least Concern (IUCN 3.1)

Scientific classification
- Kingdom: Animalia
- Phylum: Chordata
- Class: Actinopterygii
- Order: Tetraodontiformes
- Family: Tetraodontidae
- Genus: Auriglobus
- Species: A. nefastus

Binomial name
- Auriglobus nefastus (Roberts, 1982)
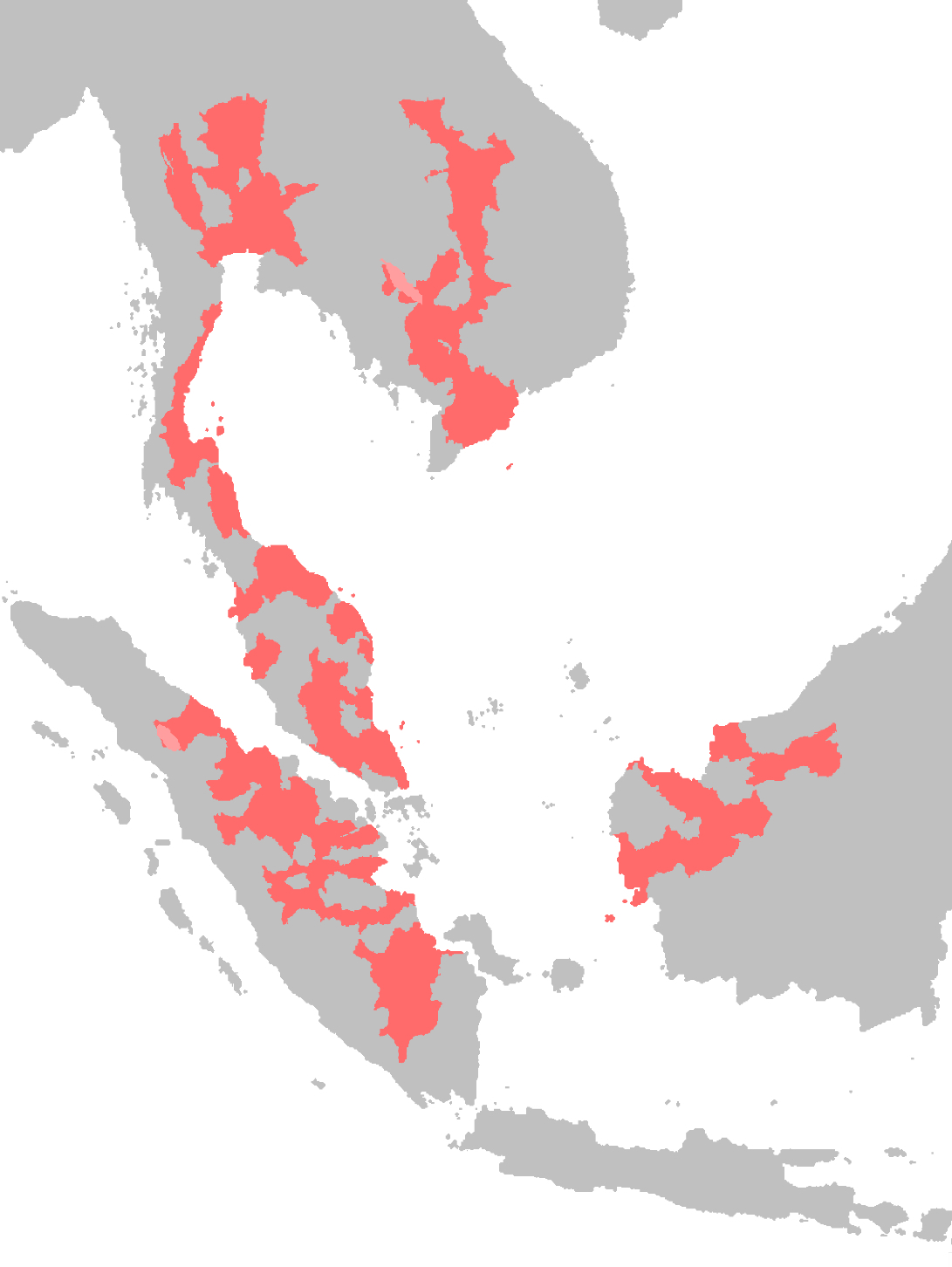
- Possibly extant range

Synonyms
- Chonerhinos nefastus

Species of fish

Auriglobus nefastus, known as the greenbottle pufferfish, is a species of pufferfish in the family Tetraodontidae. It is a freshwater species native to Asia, where it may be found from the Mekong basin to Indonesia. It occurs in fast-flowing waters of rivers and streams, although it is known to enter flooded forests and plains when river water levels rise. It feeds on the scales and fins of other fish and reaches 13 cm (5.1 inches) SL. The common name of the species comes from its coloration, which ranges from light green to golden.
