= Auriglobus amabilis =

Conservation status
- Least Concern (IUCN 3.1)

Scientific classification
- Kingdom: Animalia
- Phylum: Chordata
- Class: Actinopterygii
- Order: Tetraodontiformes
- Family: Tetraodontidae
- Genus: Auriglobus
- Species: A. amabilis

Binomial name
- Auriglobus amabilis (Roberts, 1982)
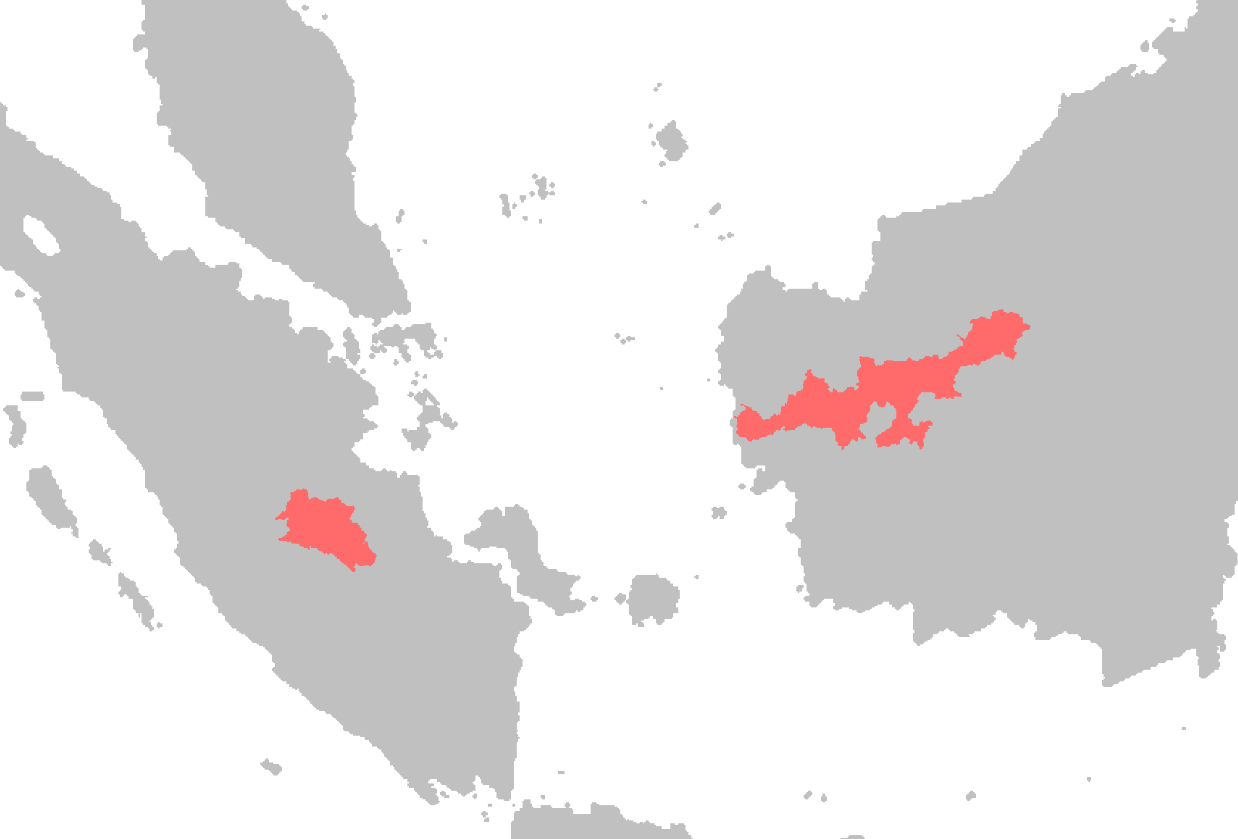

Synonyms
- Chonerhinos amabilis

Species of pufferfish

Auriglobus amabilis is a species of pufferfish in the family Tetraodontidae. It is a tropical freshwater species known only from Indonesia. The species reaches 7 cm (2.8 inches) SL and feeds almost exclusively on large aquatic insect larvae. It was originally included in the genus Chonerhinos alongside the four other species now included in Auriglobus, although the only remaining member of the former genus, C. naritus, differs from Auriglobus by being larger and not an exclusively freshwater fish.
