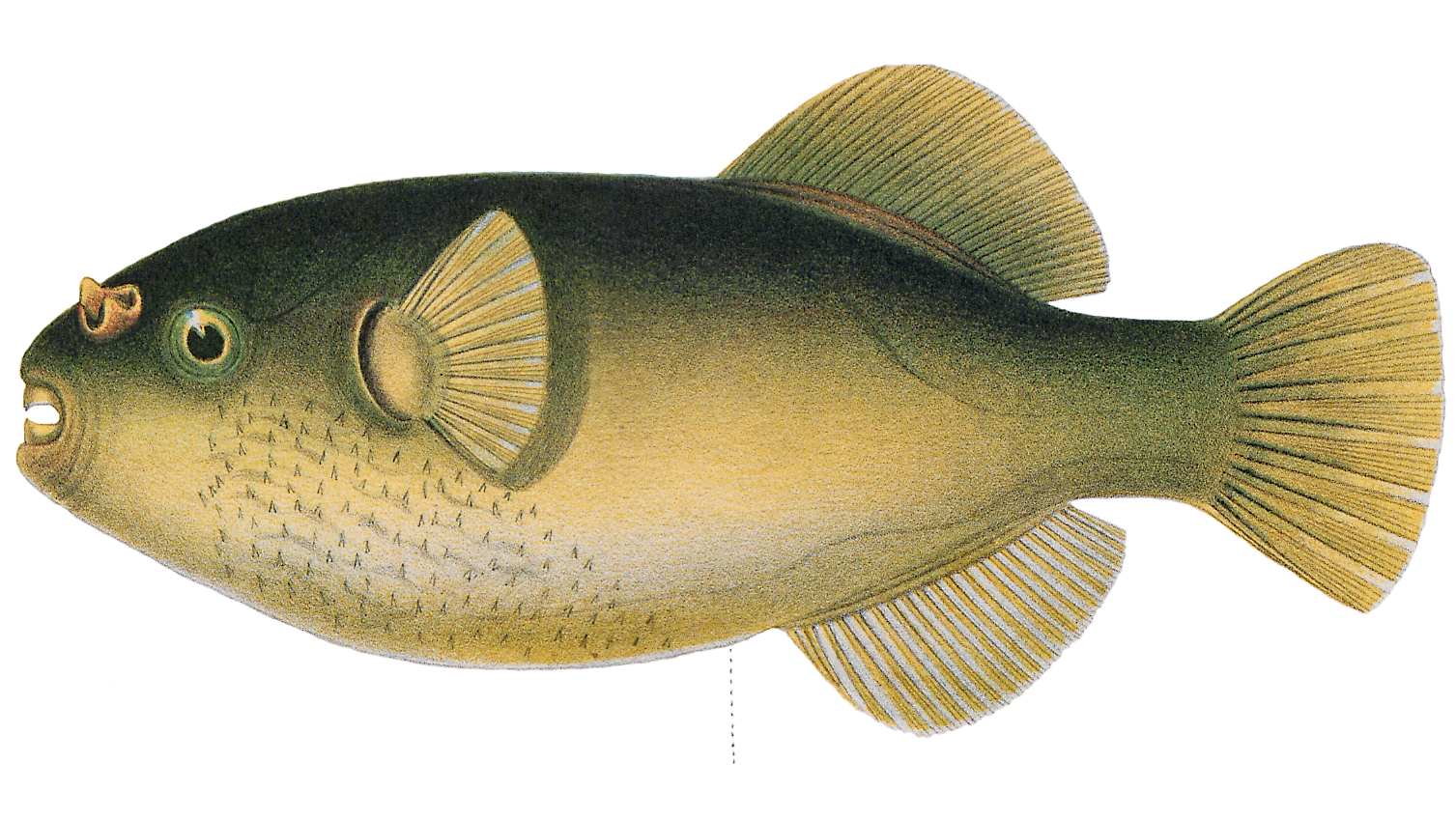
- Auriglobus modestus

Scientific classification
- Kingdom: Animalia
- Phylum: Chordata
- Class: Actinopterygii
- Order: Tetraodontiformes
- Family: Tetraodontidae
- Subfamily: Tetraodontinae
- Genus: Auriglobus; Kottelat, 1999

Species
- 5 species (see text)
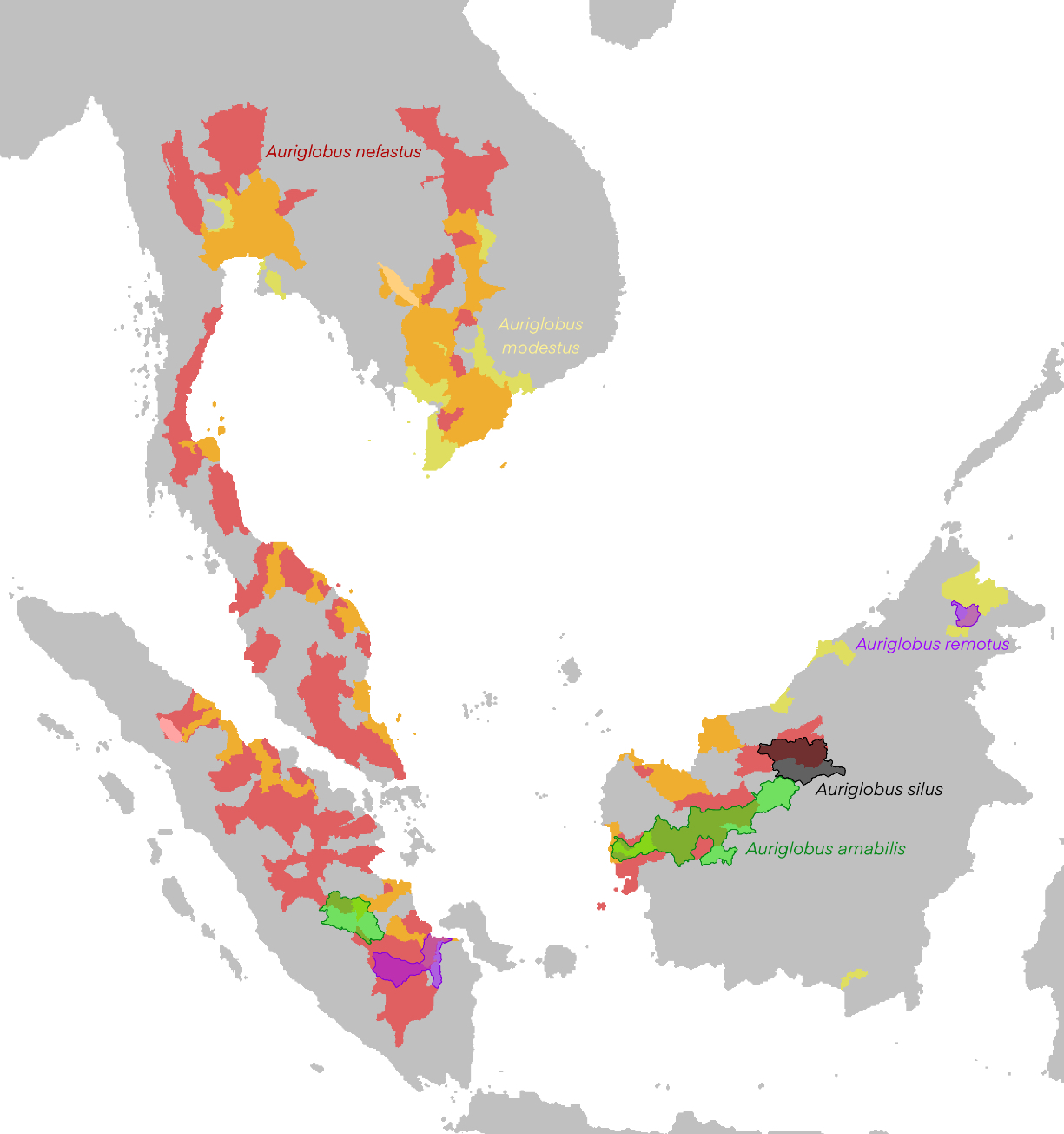

= Auriglobus =

Genus of fishes

Auriglobus is a genus of freshwater pufferfishes native to Southeast Asia. They generally resemble Chonerhinos, but are considerably smaller, only reaching up to 13 cm (5.1 in) in length, and are more strongly associated with freshwater. The different Auriglobus species are very similar in appearance — greenish-golden or yellowish-golden above and pale below — but can be separated by morphometrics and meristics. Until 1999, the Auriglobus species were included in Chonerhinos.

== Species ==
There are five recognized species in this genus:

- Auriglobus amabilis (T. R. Roberts, 1982)
- Auriglobus modestus (Bleeker, 1850) (bronze puffer or golden puffer)
- Auriglobus nefastus (T. R. Roberts, 1982) (greenbottle pufferfish)
- Auriglobus remotus (T. R. Roberts, 1982)
- Auriglobus silus (T. R. Roberts, 1982)
