= Dinjapygidae =

Scientific classification
- Domain: Eukaryota
- Kingdom: Animalia
- Phylum: Arthropoda
- Order: Diplura
- Superfamily: Japygoidea
- Family: Dinjapygidae; Womersley, 1939
- Genus: Dinjapyx; Silvestri, 1930

Genus of two-pronged bristletails

The Dinjapygidae family of diplurans contains one genus, with six recognized species:

- Genus Dinjapyx Silvestri, 1930
  - Dinjapyx barbatus Silvestri, 1930
  - Dinjapyx manni Silvestri, 1948
  - Dinjapyx marcusi Silvestri, 1948
  - Dinjapyx michelbacheri (Smith, 1959)
  - Dinjapyx rossi (Smith, 1959)
  - Dinjapyx weyrauchi González, 1964
