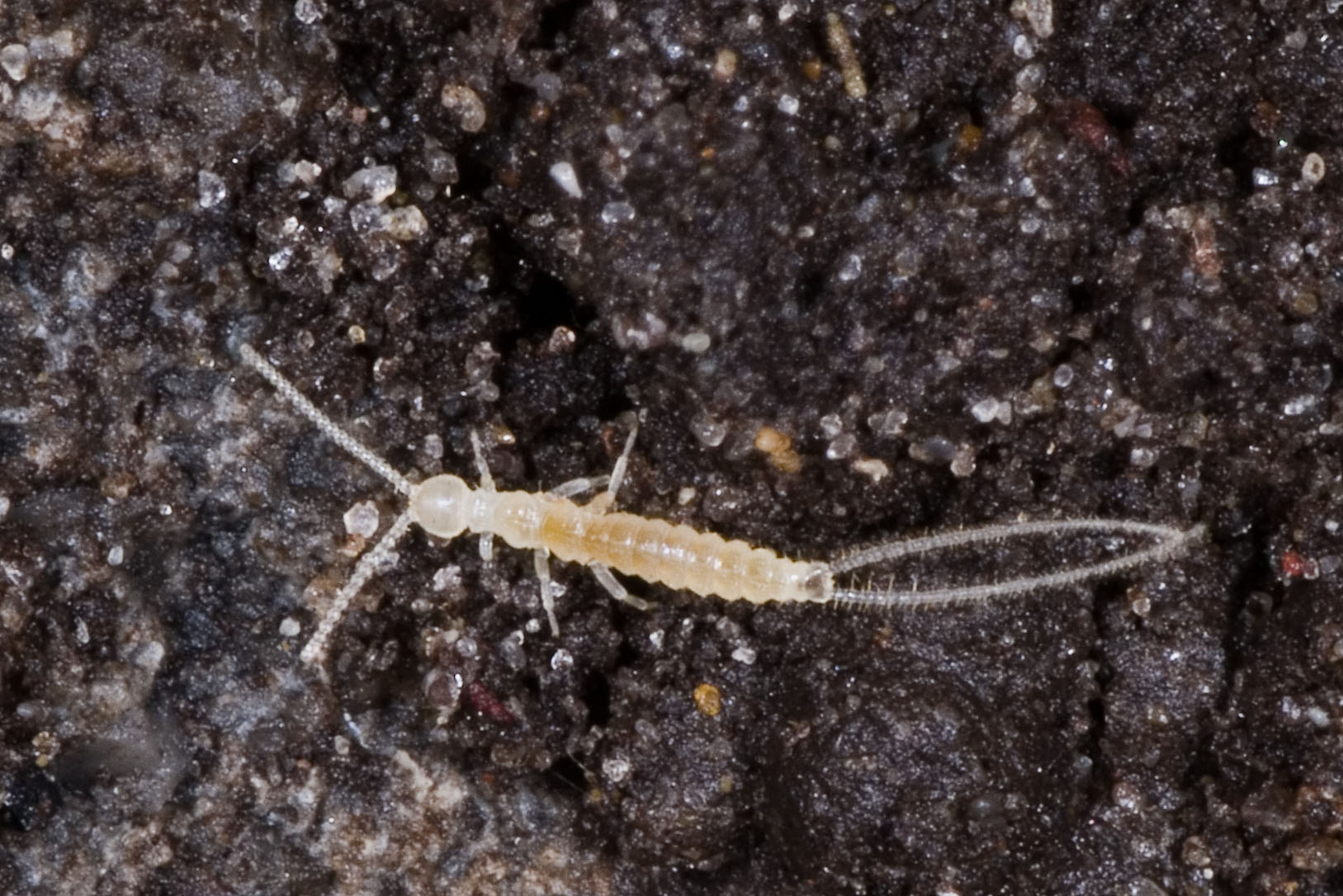
- Campodea staphylinus

Scientific classification
- Domain: Eukaryota
- Kingdom: Animalia
- Phylum: Arthropoda
- Order: Diplura
- Suborder: Rhabdura; Cook, 1896

= Rhabdura =

Suborder of two-pronged bristletails

Rhabdura is a suborder of two-pronged bristletails in the order Diplura. There are about 5 families and more than 290 described species in Rhabdura.

== Families ==
These five families belong to the suborder Rhabdura:

- Campodeoidea Lubbock, 1873
  - Campodeidae Lubbock, 1873
  - Procampodeidae Silvestri, 1948
- Projapygoidea Cook, 1896
  - Anajapygidae Paclt, 1957
  - Octostigmatidae Rusek, 1982
  - Projapygidae Cook, 1896
