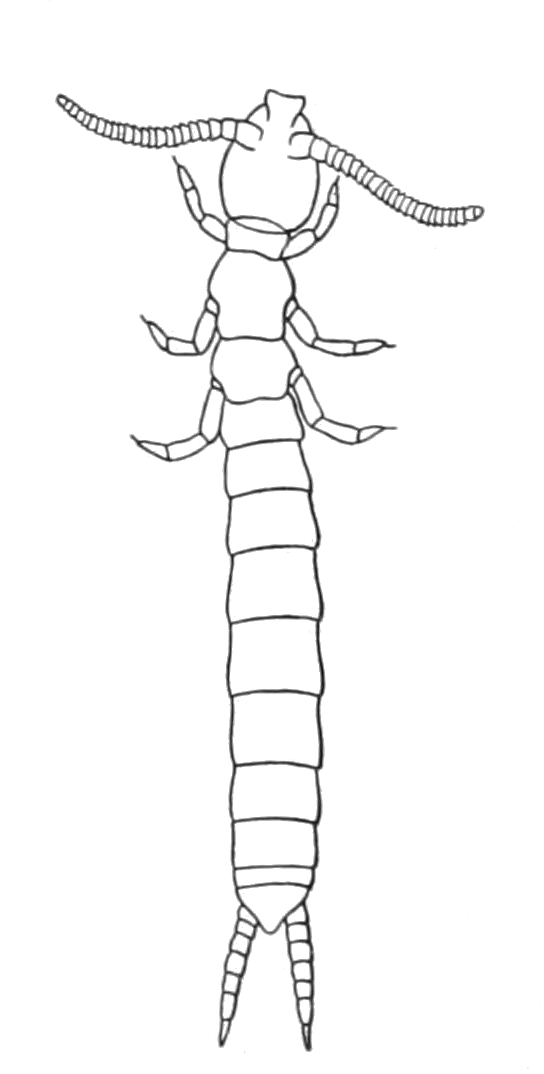

Scientific classification
- Kingdom: Animalia
- Phylum: Arthropoda
- Clade: Pancrustacea
- Class: Entognatha
- Order: Diplura
- Superfamily: Projapygoidea
- Family: Anajapygidae; Bagnall, 1918

= Anajapygidae =

Family of two-pronged bristletails

The Anajapygidae are a small family of diplurans. They can be distinguished by their relatively short, stout cerci, which discharge abdominal secretions. Unlike most diplurans, which are largely predatory, these are scavengers.

== Species ==
The family Anajapygidae contains two genera, with eight recognized species:

- Anajapyx Silvestri, 1903
  - Anajapyx amabilis Smith, 1960
  - Anajapyx carli Pagés, 1997
  - Anajapyx guineensis Silvestri, 1938
  - Anajapyx menkei Smith, 1960
  - Anajapyx mexicanus Silvestri, 1909
  - Anajapyx stangei Smith, 1960
  - Anajapyx vesiculosus Silvestri, 1903
- Paranajapyx Pagés, 1997
  - Paranajapyx hermosus (L.Smith, 1960)
- Eoanajapyx Wang, Y., Sánchez-García, A., Sendra, A. et al. 2026
  - Eoanajapyx yinae Wang, 2026
