= Octostigma =

Scientific classification
- Domain: Eukaryota
- Kingdom: Animalia
- Phylum: Arthropoda
- Order: Diplura
- Superfamily: Campodeoidea
- Family: Octostigmatidae; Rusek, 1982
- Genus: Octostigma; Rusek, 1982

Genus of two-pronged bristletails

Octostigma is a small genus of diplurans, placed in its own family, Octostigmatidae. It contains three recognized species:

- Octostigma herbivora Rusek, 1982
- Octostigma sinensis Xie & Yang, 1991
- Octostigma spiniferum Pagés, 2001
