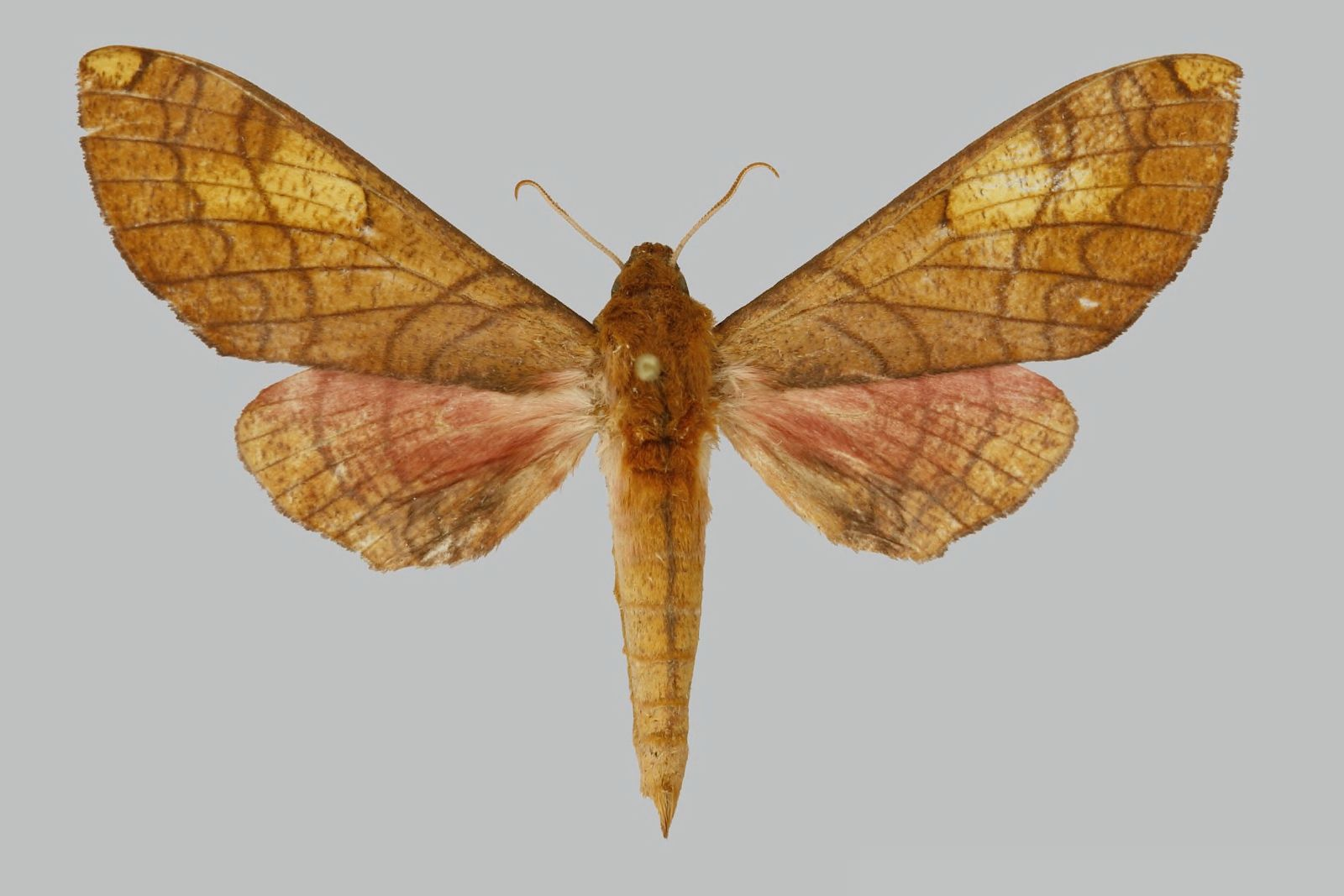

Scientific classification
- Kingdom: Animalia
- Phylum: Arthropoda
- Class: Insecta
- Order: Lepidoptera
- Family: Sphingidae
- Tribe: Smerinthini
- Genus: Afrosphinx; Carcasson, 1968
- Species: A. amabilis

Binomial name
- Afrosphinx amabilis (Jordan, 1911)

Synonyms
- Polyptychus amabilis Jordan, 1911; Polyptychus amabilis occidens Clark, 1927

= Afrosphinx =

Genus of moths

Afrosphinx is a genus of moths in the family Sphingidae, containing one species, Afrosphinx amabilis, which is known from Zambia and the Democratic Republic of the Congo. The habitat consists of Brachystegia woodland.
