= Heterojapyx =

Scientific classification
- Kingdom: Animalia
- Phylum: Arthropoda
- Class: Entognatha
- Order: Diplura
- Family: Heterojapygidae; Womersley, 1939
- Genus: Heterojapyx; Verhoeff, 1904

Species
- See text

Genus of two-pronged bristletails

Heterojapyx is a genus of diplurans in the family Heterojapygidae.

== Species ==
- Heterojapyx dux Skorikov, 1911
- Heterojapyx evansi Womersley, 1934
- Heterojapyx gallardi Tillyard, 1924
- Heterojapyx novaezeelandiae Verhoeff, 1903
- Heterojapyx pauliani Pagés, 1955
- Heterojapyx tambourinensis Womersley, 1934
- Heterojapyx souliei Bouvier, 1905
- Heterojapyx victoriae Silvestri, 1911
