= Asclepias amabilis =

Scientific classification
- Kingdom: Plantae
- Clade: Tracheophytes
- Clade: Angiosperms
- Clade: Eudicots
- Clade: Asterids
- Order: Gentianales
- Family: Apocynaceae
- Genus: Asclepias
- Species: A. amabilis

Binomial name
- Asclepias amabilis N.E.Br.

Species of flowering plant

Asclepias amabilis is a species of perennial milkweed endemic to southwest Tanzania to Zambia. It grows in the seasonally dry tropic biome and grows October through December. It is in the family Apocynaceae.
