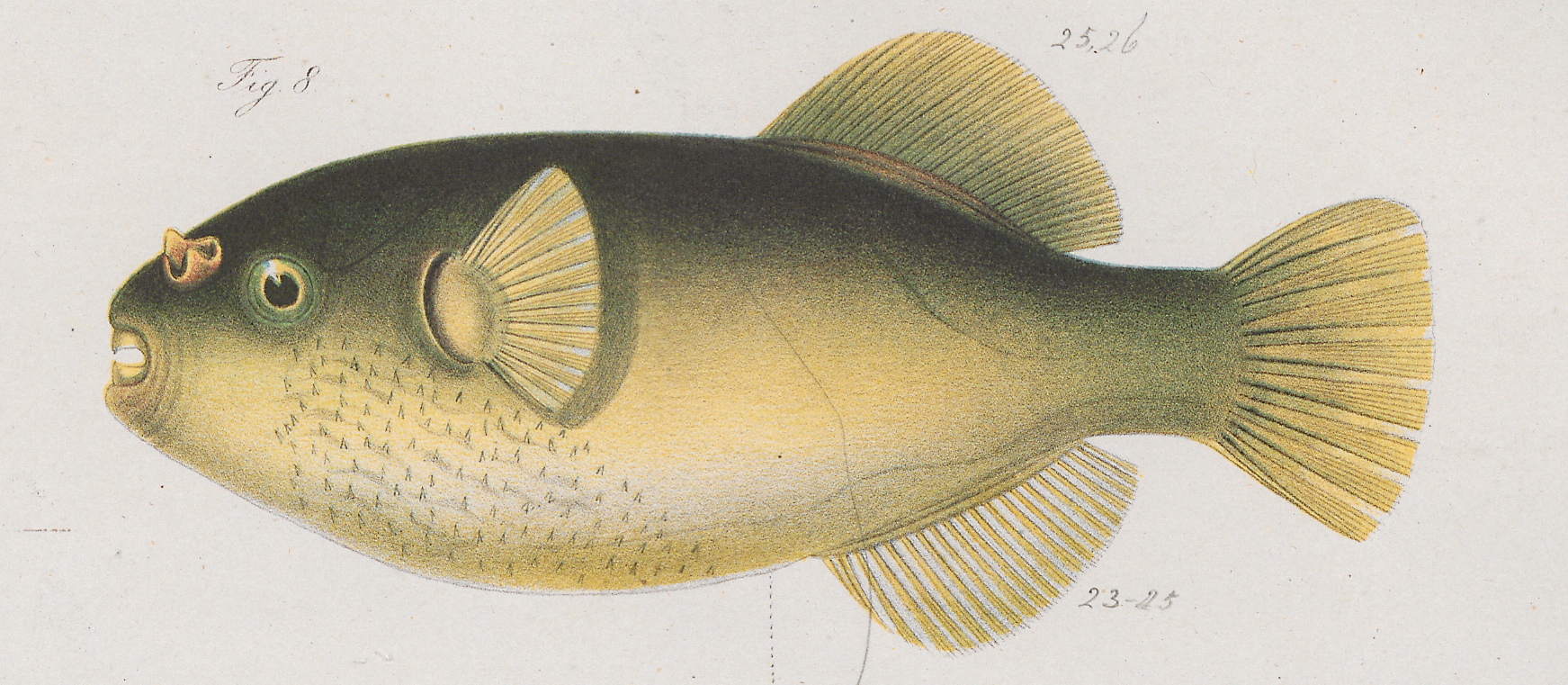

Conservation status
- Least Concern (IUCN 3.1)

Scientific classification
- Kingdom: Animalia
- Phylum: Chordata
- Class: Actinopterygii
- Order: Tetraodontiformes
- Family: Tetraodontidae
- Genus: Auriglobus
- Species: A. modestus

Binomial name
- Auriglobus modestus (Bleeker, 1850)
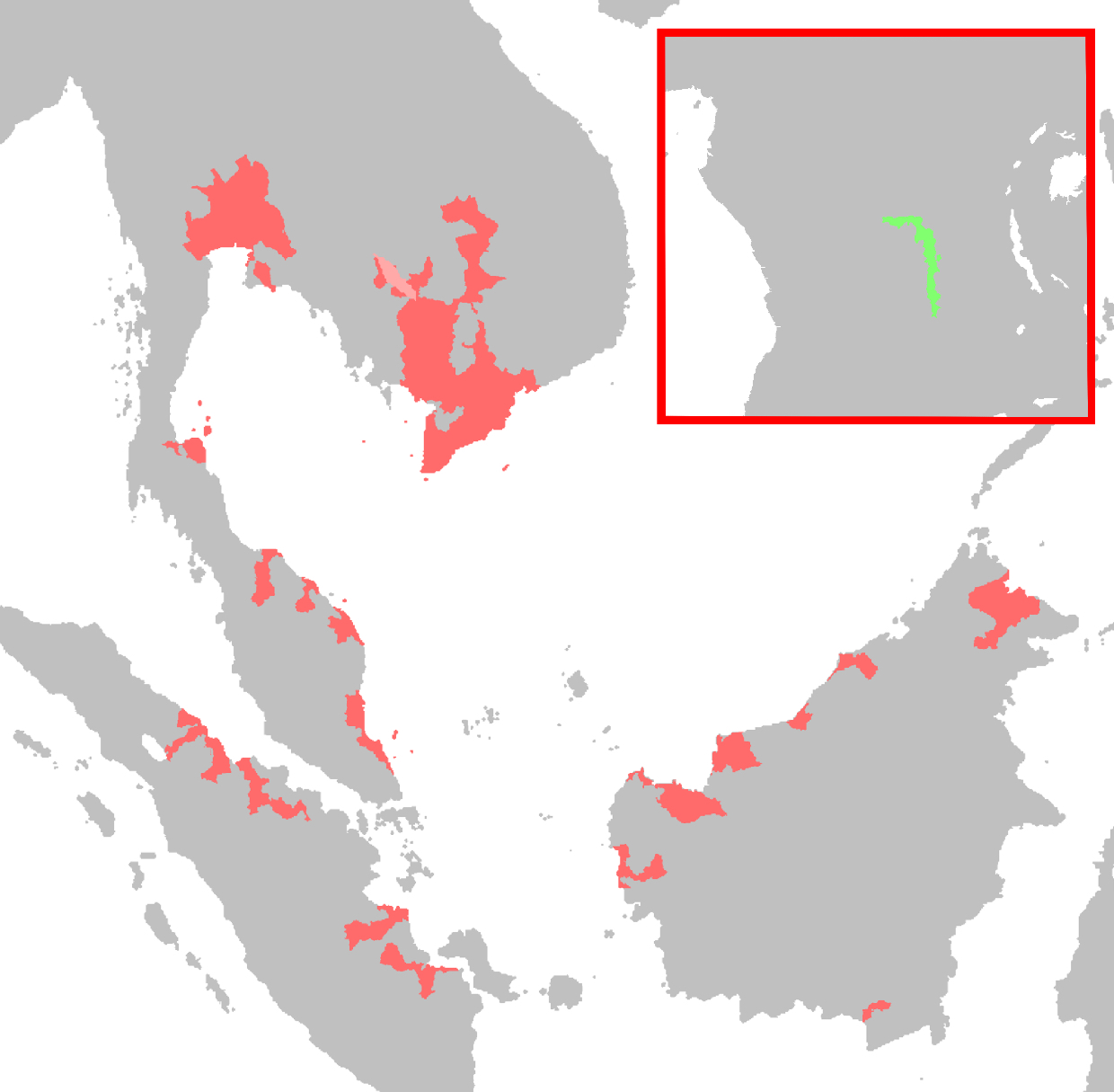
- Light red: possibly extant Light green:possibly extant & unknown origin (possibly introduced)

Synonyms
- Chonerhinos modestus Xenopterus modestus

= Auriglobus modestus =

Species of fish

Auriglobus modestus, the bronze puffer or golden puffer, is a ray-finned fish in the family Tetraodontidae. It is found in the middle parts of rivers to their estuaries in southeast Asia, including Cambodia, Laos, Thailand, Vietnam, Malaysia and Indonesia. It grows to a maximum length of 10.6 cm (4.2 in) and feeds on small invertebrates, seeds, fish scales and small fish.
