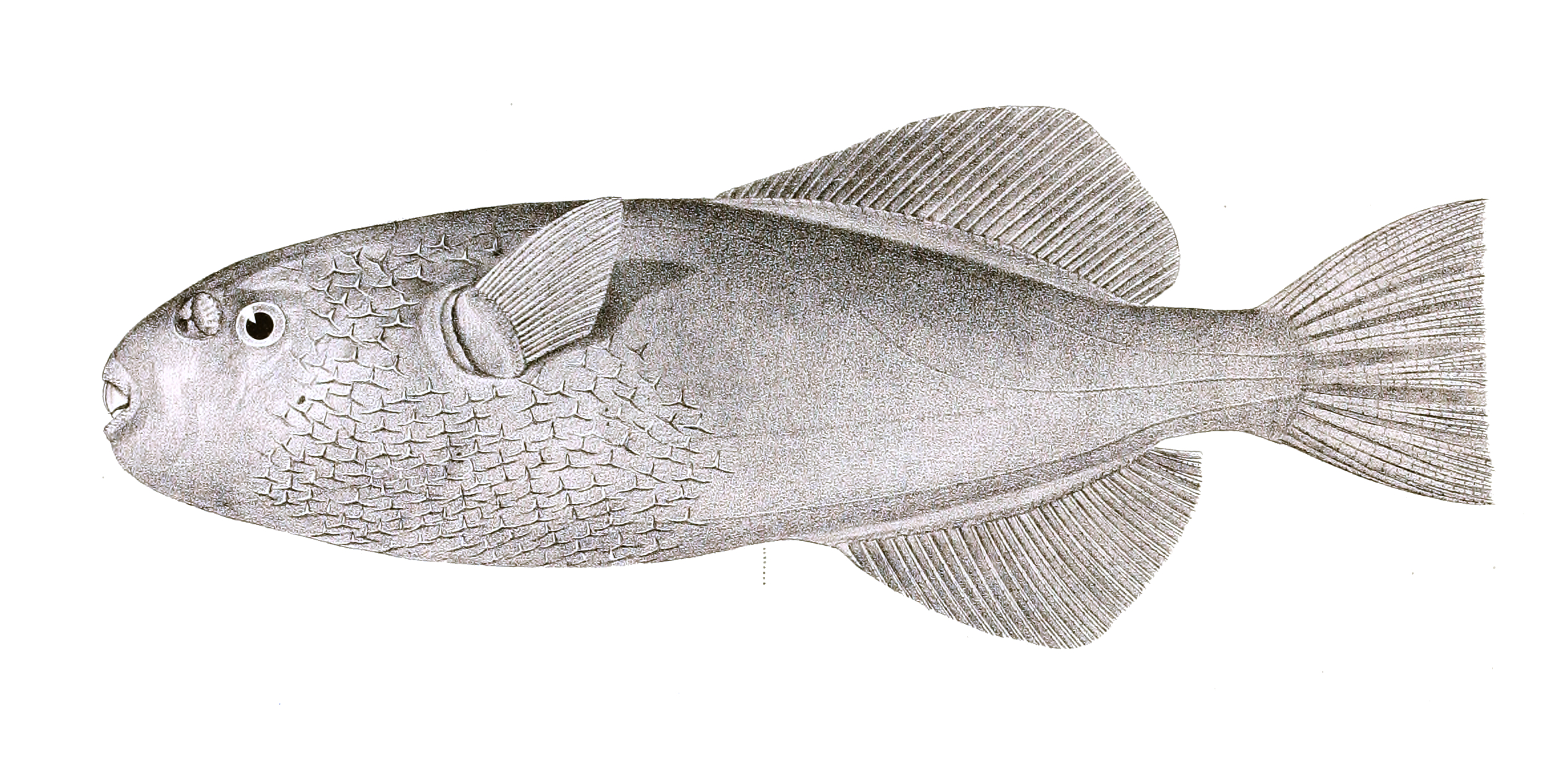

Scientific classification
- Kingdom: Animalia
- Phylum: Chordata
- Class: Actinopterygii
- Order: Tetraodontiformes
- Family: Tetraodontidae
- Genus: Chonerhinos; Bleeker, 1854
- Species: C. naritus

Binomial name
- Chonerhinos naritus (J. Richardson, 1848)

Synonyms
- Tetrodon naritus Richardson, 1848; Tetraodon naritus Richardson, 1848; Xenopterus naritus (Richardson, 1848)

= Chonerhinos =

Genus of fishes

Chonerhinos is a monotypic genus of pufferfish, family Tetraodontidae. The only species is Chonerhinos naritus, the bronze pufferfish or yellow pufferfish. It is native to Southeast Asia, where it is mainly found in estuarine and coastal habitats. This species grows to a length of 28.5 centimetres (11.2 in) TL, but otherwise it generally resembles the smaller and more strictly freshwater Auriglobus pufferfish. This predatory species feeds on other fish, crustaceans (both crabs and shrimp) and snails.

== Taxonomy ==
Chonerhinos naritus is the only species in the genus Chonerhinos, but the synonym Xenopterus was formerly used instead. At that point the genus name Chonerhinos was used for the species modestus and its relatives, but this was incorrect and they were moved to Auriglobus in 1999.
