= Projapygidae =

Scientific classification
- Domain: Eukaryota
- Kingdom: Animalia
- Phylum: Arthropoda
- Order: Diplura
- Superfamily: Projapygoidea
- Family: Projapygidae; Cook, 1896

Family of two-pronged bristletails

The Projapygidae are a family of hexapods in the order Diplura.

== Genera ==
- Biclavula San Martín, 1963
- Pentacladiscus San Martín, 1963
- Projapyx Cook, 1899
- Symphylurinus Silvestri, 1909
