= Parajapygidae =

Scientific classification
- Domain: Eukaryota
- Kingdom: Animalia
- Phylum: Arthropoda
- Order: Diplura
- Superfamily: Japygoidea
- Family: Parajapygidae; Womersley, 1939

Family of two-pronged bristletails

Parajapygidae is a family of hexapods in the order Diplura.

== Genera ==
- Ectasjapyx Silvestri, 1929
- Miojapyx Ewing, 1941
- Grassjapyx Silvestri, 1903
- Parajapyx Silvestri, 1903
