= Mastogenius castlei =

Scientific classification
- Domain: Eukaryota
- Kingdom: Animalia
- Phylum: Arthropoda
- Class: Insecta
- Order: Coleoptera
- Suborder: Polyphaga
- Infraorder: Elateriformia
- Family: Buprestidae
- Genus: Mastogenius
- Species: M. castlei

Binomial name
- Mastogenius castlei Champlain & Knull, 1922

Synonyms
- Mastogenius antennatus Cazier, 1952

Species of beetle

Mastogenius castlei is a species of metallic wood-boring beetle in the family Buprestidae. It is found in the Caribbean Sea and North America.
