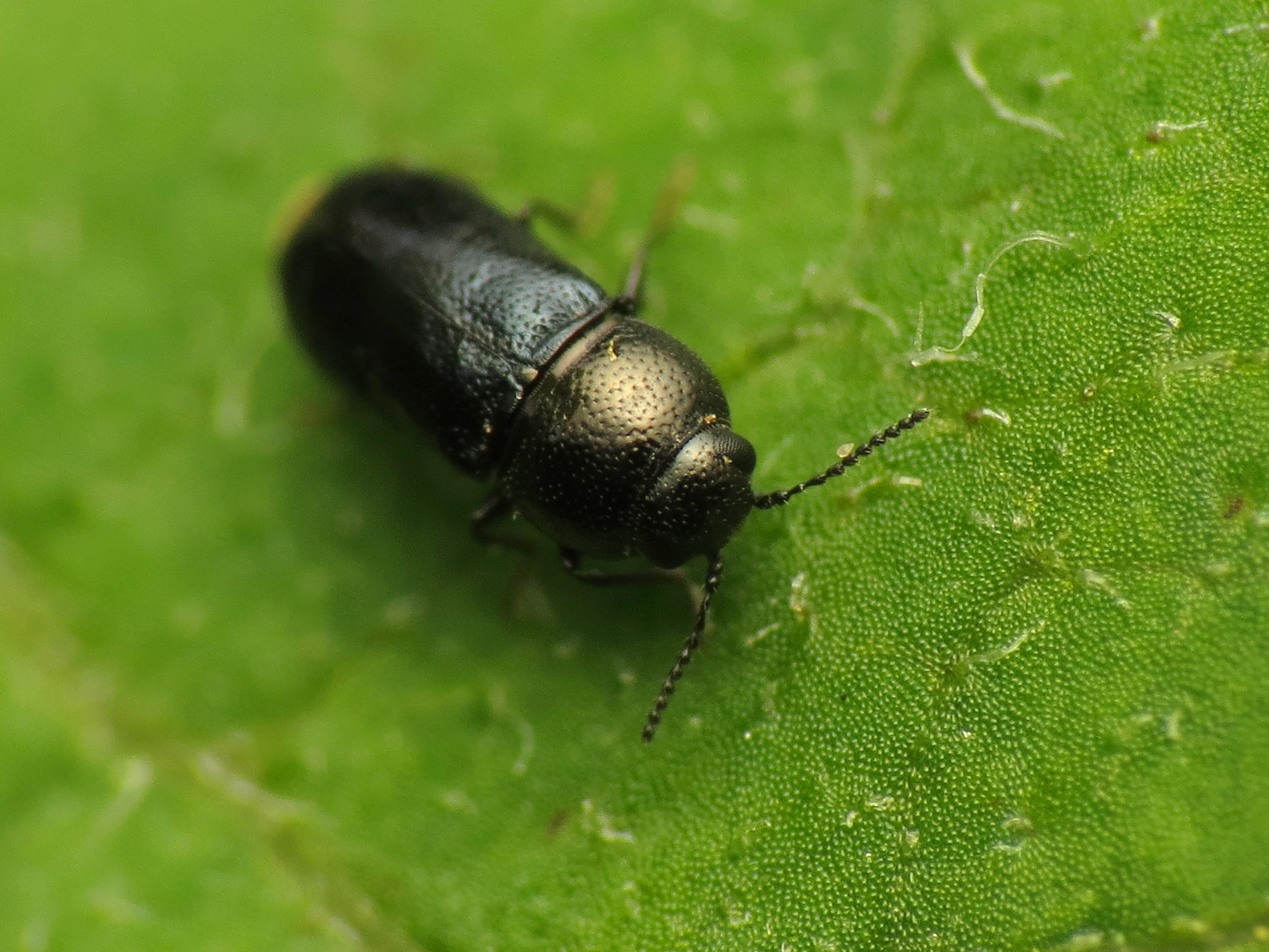
- Mastogenius subcyaneus

Scientific classification
- Kingdom: Animalia
- Phylum: Arthropoda
- Class: Insecta
- Order: Coleoptera
- Suborder: Polyphaga
- Infraorder: Elateriformia
- Family: Buprestidae
- Tribe: Haplostethini
- Genus: Mastogenius; Solier, 1849

= Mastogenius =

Genus of beetles

Mastogenius is a genus of beetles in the family Buprestidae, containing the following species:

- Mastogenius aeneus Kerremans, 1897
- Mastogenius aliciae Westcott, 2005
- Mastogenius arizonicus Bellamy, 2002
- Mastogenius barrigai Moore, 1994
- Mastogenius castlei Champlain & Knull, 1922
- Mastogenius cedralensis Manley, 1987
- Mastogenius changonensis Manley, 1986
- Mastogenius coyolensis Manley, 1987
- Mastogenius crenulatus Knull, 1934
- Mastogenius cuneaticollis Van Dyke, 1953
- Mastogenius cyanelytron Westcott, 2008
- Mastogenius cyaneous Fisher, 1922
- Mastogenius elinarae Manley, 1986
- Mastogenius eruleus Obenberger, 1939
- Mastogenius galapagoensis Van Dyke, 1953
- Mastogenius guayasensis Manley, 1986
- Mastogenius guayllabambensis MacRae, 2003
- Mastogenius howdenorum Manley, 1990
- Mastogenius impressipennis Fall, 1906
- Mastogenius insperatus Kurosawa, 1972
- Mastogenius jipijapa Manley, 1986
- Mastogenius laevifrons Germain & Kerremans, 1906
- Mastogenius lizaleriae Moore, 1998
- Mastogenius manglaraltoensis Manley, 1986
- Mastogenius martinezi Cobos, 1956
- Mastogenius pacacua Manley, 1987
- Mastogenius parallelus Solier, 1849
- Mastogenius peruvianus Fisher, 1949
- Mastogenius primaevus Obenberger, 1957
- Mastogenius proximus Cobos, 1981
- Mastogenius puncticollis Schaeffer, 1919
- Mastogenius relictus Bílý, 1979
- Mastogenius reticulicollis Cobos, 1981
- Mastogenius robustus Schaeffer, 1905
- Mastogenius simulans Cobos, 1981
- Mastogenius solieri Thomson, 1878
- Mastogenius subcyaneus (LeConte, 1860)
- Mastogenius sulcicollis Philippi in Philippi & Philippi, 1864
- Mastogenius taoi (Tôyama, 1983)
- Mastogenius testaceipes Obenberger, 1941
- Mastogenius texanus Bellamy, 2002
