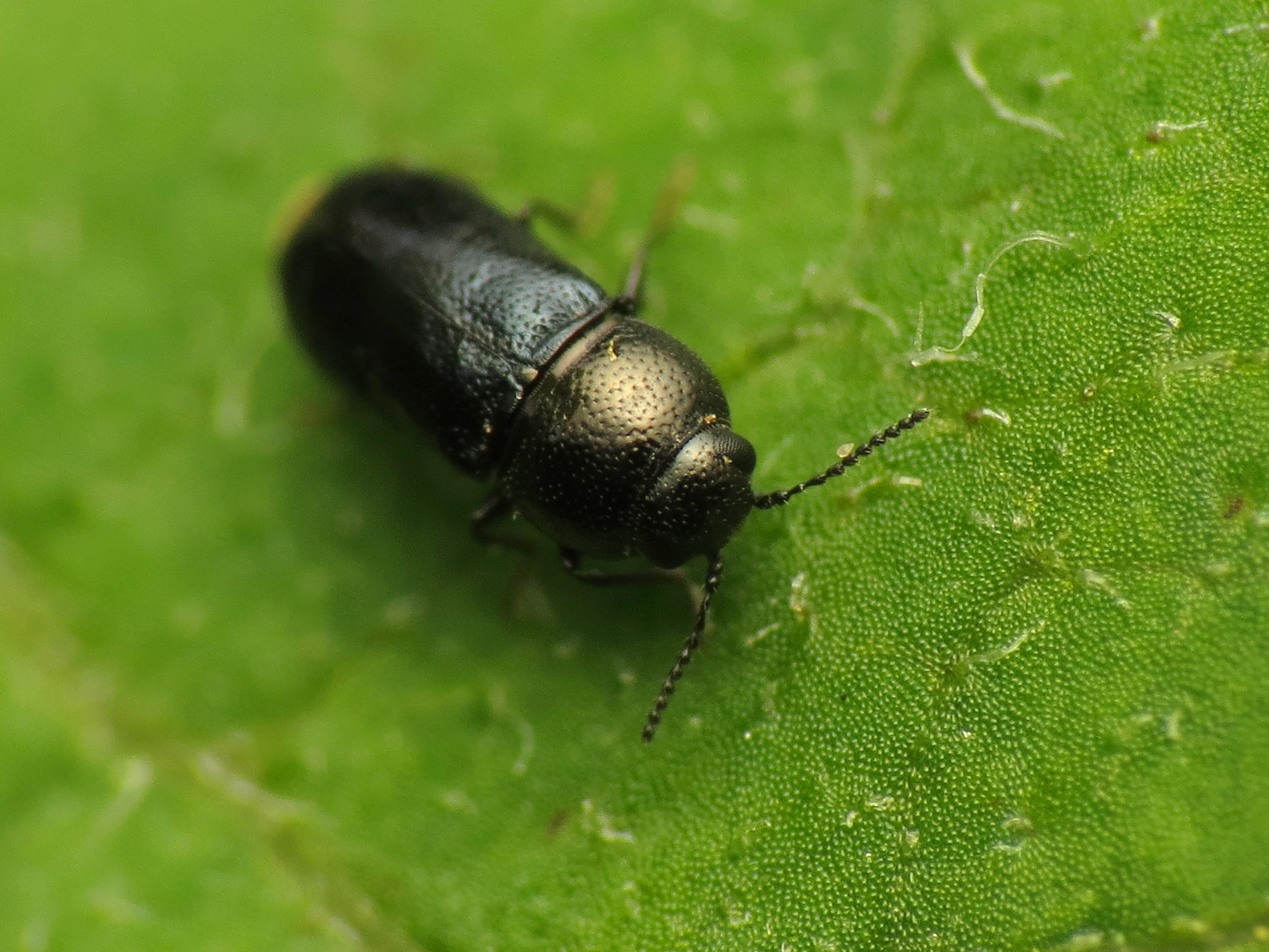

Scientific classification
- Domain: Eukaryota
- Kingdom: Animalia
- Phylum: Arthropoda
- Class: Insecta
- Order: Coleoptera
- Suborder: Polyphaga
- Infraorder: Elateriformia
- Family: Buprestidae
- Genus: Mastogenius
- Species: M. subcyaneus

Binomial name
- Mastogenius subcyaneus (LeConte, 1860)

= Mastogenius subcyaneus =

Species of beetle

Mastogenius subcyaneus is a species of metallic wood-boring beetle in the family Buprestidae. It is found in North America.
