= Mastogenius crenulatus =

Scientific classification
- Domain: Eukaryota
- Kingdom: Animalia
- Phylum: Arthropoda
- Class: Insecta
- Order: Coleoptera
- Suborder: Polyphaga
- Infraorder: Elateriformia
- Family: Buprestidae
- Genus: Mastogenius
- Species: M. crenulatus

Binomial name
- Mastogenius crenulatus Knull, 1934

Synonyms
- Mastogenius knulli Obenberger, 1939

Species of beetle

Mastogenius crenulatus is a species of metallic wood-boring beetle in the family Buprestidae. It is found in North America.
