= A. amplicollis =

A. amplicollis may refer to:

- Abacetus amplicollis, a ground beetle found in India and Myanmar
- Acmaeodera amplicollis, a jewel beetle found in Central and North America
