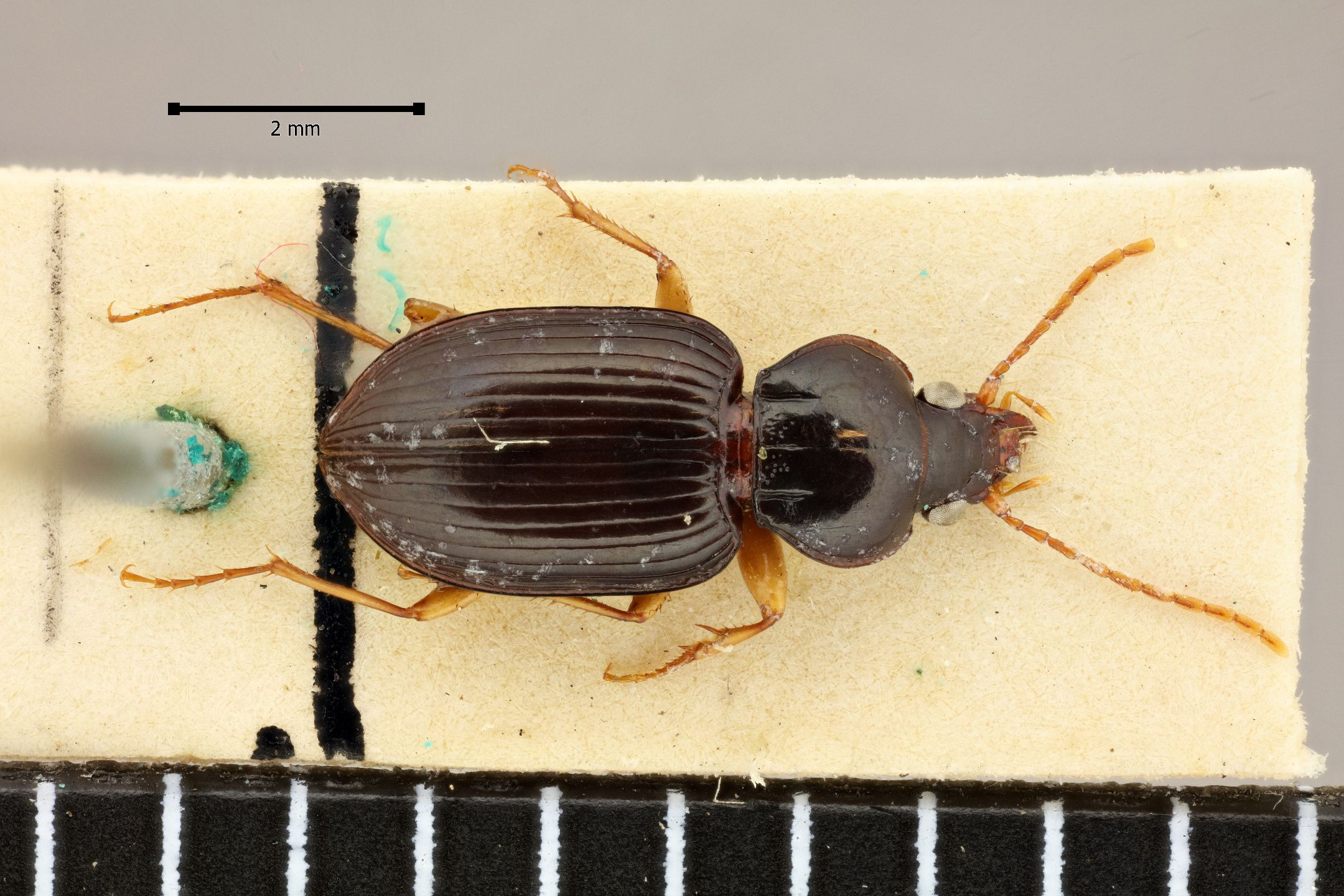

Scientific classification
- Kingdom: Animalia
- Phylum: Arthropoda
- Class: Insecta
- Order: Coleoptera
- Suborder: Adephaga
- Family: Carabidae
- Genus: Abacetus
- Species: A. amplicollis

Binomial name
- Abacetus amplicollis Bates, 1890

= Abacetus amplicollis =

Species of beetle

Abacetus amplicollis is a species of ground beetle in the subfamily Pterostichinae. It was described by Henry Walter Bates in 1890 and is found in India and Myanmar.
