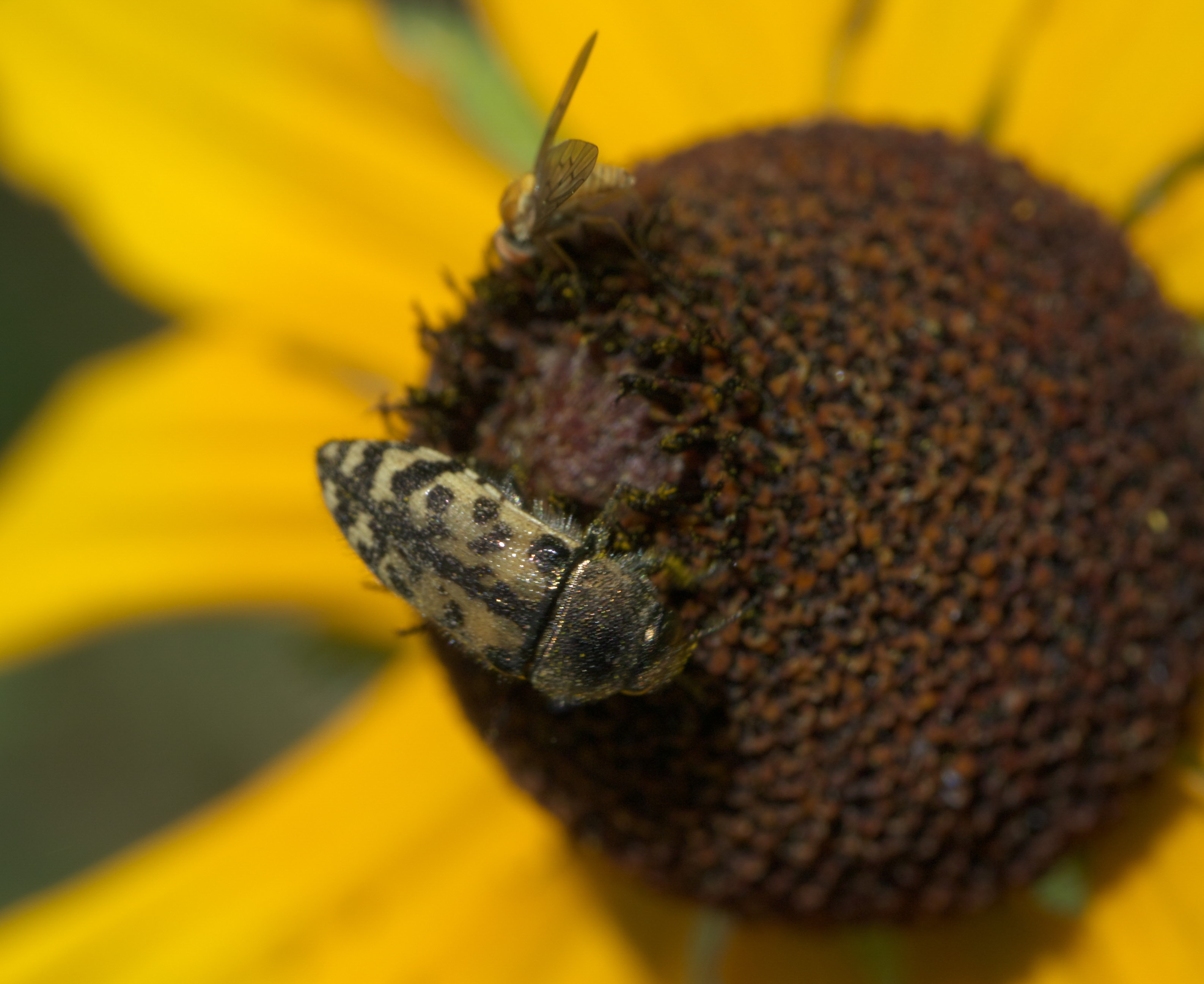

Scientific classification
- Domain: Eukaryota
- Kingdom: Animalia
- Phylum: Arthropoda
- Class: Insecta
- Order: Coleoptera
- Suborder: Polyphaga
- Infraorder: Elateriformia
- Family: Buprestidae
- Genus: Acmaeodera
- Species: A. mixta

Binomial name
- Acmaeodera mixta LeConte, 1860

Synonyms
- Acmaeodera arizonae Horn, 1878; Acmaeodera obesa Kerremans, 1910

= Acmaeodera mixta =

Species of beetle

Acmaeodera mixta is a species of metallic wood-boring beetle in the family Buprestidae. It is found in Central America and North America.
