= Acmaeodera vanduzeei =

Scientific classification
- Domain: Eukaryota
- Kingdom: Animalia
- Phylum: Arthropoda
- Class: Insecta
- Order: Coleoptera
- Suborder: Polyphaga
- Infraorder: Elateriformia
- Family: Buprestidae
- Genus: Acmaeodera
- Species: A. vanduzeei

Binomial name
- Acmaeodera vanduzeei Van Dyke, 1934

Synonyms
- Acmaeodera fisheri Cazier, 1940; Acmaeodera nanbrownae Figg-Hoblyn, 1953; Acmaeodera vermiculata Knull, 1947

Species of beetle

Acmaeodera vanduzeei is a species of metallic wood-boring beetle in the family Buprestidae. It is found in Central America and North America.
