= Acmaeodera rubrocuprea =

Scientific classification
- Kingdom: Animalia
- Phylum: Arthropoda
- Clade: Pancrustacea
- Class: Insecta
- Order: Coleoptera
- Suborder: Polyphaga
- Infraorder: Elateriformia
- Family: Buprestidae
- Genus: Acmaeodera
- Species: A. rubrocuprea

Binomial name
- Acmaeodera rubrocuprea Westcott and Nelson, 2000

Species of beetle

Acmaeodera rubrocuprea is a species in the family Buprestidae ("metallic wood-boring beetles"), in the suborder Polyphaga ("water, rove, scarab, long-horned, leaf and snout beetles"). The distribution range of Acmaeodera rubrocuprea includes Central America and North America.
