= Acmaeodera convicta =

Scientific classification
- Domain: Eukaryota
- Kingdom: Animalia
- Phylum: Arthropoda
- Class: Insecta
- Order: Coleoptera
- Suborder: Polyphaga
- Infraorder: Elateriformia
- Family: Buprestidae
- Genus: Acmaeodera
- Species: A. convicta

Binomial name
- Acmaeodera convicta Fall, 1899

Synonyms
- Acmaeodera papagonis Duncan, 1934

Species of beetle

Acmaeodera convicta is a species of metallic wood-boring beetle in the family Buprestidae. It is found in Central America and North America.
