= Acmaeodera immaculata =

Scientific classification
- Kingdom: Animalia
- Phylum: Arthropoda
- Class: Insecta
- Order: Coleoptera
- Suborder: Polyphaga
- Infraorder: Elateriformia
- Family: Buprestidae
- Genus: Acmaeodera
- Species: A. immaculata

Binomial name
- Acmaeodera immaculata Horn, 1878

Synonyms
- Acmaeodera eburna Van Dyke, 1949

Species of beetle

Acmaeodera immaculata is a species of metallic wood-boring beetle in the family Buprestidae. It is found in North America.
