= Acmaeodera uvaldensis =

Scientific classification
- Domain: Eukaryota
- Kingdom: Animalia
- Phylum: Arthropoda
- Class: Insecta
- Order: Coleoptera
- Suborder: Polyphaga
- Infraorder: Elateriformia
- Family: Buprestidae
- Genus: Acmaeodera
- Species: A. uvaldensis

Binomial name
- Acmaeodera uvaldensis Knull, 1936

Species of beetle

Acmaeodera uvaldensis is a species of metallic wood-boring beetle in the family Buprestidae. It is found in Central America and North America.
