= Acmaeodera nexa =

Scientific classification
- Domain: Eukaryota
- Kingdom: Animalia
- Phylum: Arthropoda
- Class: Insecta
- Order: Coleoptera
- Suborder: Polyphaga
- Infraorder: Elateriformia
- Family: Buprestidae
- Genus: Acmaeodera
- Species: A. nexa

Binomial name
- Acmaeodera nexa Fall, 1922

Species of beetle

Acmaeodera nexa is a species of metallic wood-boring beetle in the family Buprestidae. It is found in North America.
