= Lobster (disambiguation) =

A lobster is a clawed marine crustacean in the family Nephropidae/Homaridae, the "true lobsters", which includes both the large species commonly called lobsters in commerce and small species often called scampi.

The best-known true lobsters are:

- Genus Homarus, including the European and American lobsters
  - Species H. gammarus, the European lobster or common lobster
  - Species H. americanus, the American/Atlantic/Canadian/northern/Maine lobster
- Genus Nephrops
  - Species N. norvegicus, the Norway lobster, langoustine, Dublin Bay prawn or scampi
- Other Nephropidae called lobsters
  - Homarinus capensis (Herbst, 1792) – Cape lobster
  - Metanephrops spp.
    - M. andamanicus (Wood-Mason, 1892) – Andaman lobster
    - M. binghami (Boone, 1927) – Caribbean lobster
    - M. boschmai (Holthuis, 1964) – Bight lobster
    - M. japonicus (Tapparone-Canefri, 1873) – Japanese lobster
    - M. sinensis (Bruce, 1966) – China lobster

Lobster may also refer to:

== Other crustaceans ==
- Furry lobster
- Slipper lobster
- Spiny lobster or rock lobster, found worldwide
- Squat lobster
- Crayfish, also known as freshwater lobster, mountain lobster, rock lobster
  - Astacopsis gouldi, the Tasmanian giant freshwater lobster or crayfish

== Entertainment ==
- Lobster (novel), an erotic novel by Guillaume Lecasble
- The Lobster, a 2015 science fiction movie
- Lobsters (film), a 1936 British documentary
- Lobster (magazine), a British parapolitics publication
- Lobster Johnson, a Dark Horse Comics character who appears in Hellboy and his own series
- Lobster Random, a 2000 AD character
- "Lobsters", a short story by Charles Stross, subsequently incorporated into his novel Accelerando

== Other uses ==
- Lobster emoji, a character in Unicode that represents the crustacean
- Lobster clasp, a type of jewelry fastener
- Lobster mushroom, an edible North American mushroom resembling lobster meat
- Lobster graph in graph theory
- A historical derogatory term for British soldiers
- Lobster Lake, a lake in Minnesota
- LOBSTER, a network monitoring system
- Australian twenty-dollar note, as a slang term
- Red Lobster (disambiguation)

== See also ==
- Lobsterette, various small species in the Nephropidae/Homaridae family
