= Lobsterette =

Lobsterette may refer to various small species in the family Nephropidae/Homaridae:

- Metanephrops spp.
  - M. binghami, the Caribbean lobsterette
- Nephropides spp.
  - N. caribaeus, the mitten lobsterette
- Nephropsis spp.
  - N. acanthura, the spinetail lobsterette
  - N. aculeata, the Florida lobsterette
  - N. agassizii, the prickly lobsterette
  - N. atlantica, the scarlet lobsterette
  - N. carpenteri, the ridge-back lobsterette
  - N. ensirostris, the gladiator lobsterette
  - N. neglecta, the ruby lobsterette
  - N. occidentalis, the Pacific lobsterette
  - N. rosea, the two-toned lobsterette
  - N. stewarti, the Indian Ocean lobsterette
  - N. suhmi, the red and white lobsterette
  - N. sulcata, the grooved lobsterette
- Thaumastocheles spp.
  - T. dochmiodon
  - T. japonicus, the Pacific pincer lobster
  - T. zaleucus, the Atlantic pincer lobster
- Thymopides spp.
  - T. grobovi, the Bellator lobster
- Thymops spp.
  - T. birsteini, the Patagonian lobsterette
- Thymopsis (crustacean) spp.
  - T. nilenta, the Nilenta lobsterette
