= Jagtia =

Jagtia Temporal range: Maastrichtian

Scientific classification
- Kingdom: Animalia
- Phylum: Arthropoda
- Class: Malacostraca
- Order: Decapoda
- Suborder: Pleocyemata
- Family: Nephropidae
- Genus: †Jagtia; Tshudy & Sorhannus, 2000
- Species: †J. kunradensis

Binomial name
- †Jagtia kunradensis Tshudy & Sorhannus, 2000

Genus of lobsters

Jagtia kunradensis – the only species in the genus Jagtia – is a species of lobster that lived in the Upper Maastrichtian age of the Cretaceous period. It was described in 1998 by Dale Tshudy and Ulf Sorhannus of Edinboro University of Pennsylvania in the Journal of Paleontology, based on material from the type locality of the Maastricht Formation. Jagtia differs from other genera of fossil and extant lobsters by no single feature, but by a combination of characteristics, mostly based on the patterns of grooves on the carapace. The genus is named after John J. M. Jagt, curator at the Natuurhistorisch Museum Maastricht ("Maastricht Natural History Museum"), while the specific epithet kunradensis records the type locality, Kunrade, Limburg, south-eastern Netherlands. An initial morphological analysis suggested that the closest relatives of Jagtia might be the extant genera Thymops and Thymopides.
