= Jesse H. Ausubel =

American ecologist

Jesse Huntley Ausubel is an American environmental scientist and program manager of a variety of global biodiversity and ecology research programs. Ausubel serves as director and senior research associate of the Program for the Human Environment of The Rockefeller University. He was also a science advisor (2011–2019) and program manager (1994–2011) at the Alfred P. Sloan Foundation where his main area of responsibility was supporting basic research in science and technology.

== Career ==
Ausubel received his bachelor's degree from Harvard College and two master's degrees from Columbia University. He began his career in 1977 as a resident fellow in the office of the president of the National Academy of Sciences, later became a staff officer of the National Research Council Board on Atmospheric Sciences and Climate, and from 1983-1988 director of programs for the National Academy of Engineering (NAE). From 1989-1993 he served as director of studies for the Carnegie Commission on Science, Technology, and Government, which aimed to improve use of scientific expertise in the executive, legislative, and judicial branches of the U.S. government, as well as international organizations.

== Activities and research projects ==
Ausubel played a major role in the formulation of the US and world climate research programs. He was instrumental in organising the first UN World Climate Conference which was held in Geneva in 1979. This led to the elevation of the global warming issue on scientific and political agendas. Later, he led the Climate Task of the Resources and Environment Program of the International Institute for Applied Systems Analysis, near Vienna, Austria, an East-West think-tank created by the U.S. and Soviet academies of sciences. Beginning with a 1989 book on "Technology and Environment" (National Academy Press, JH Ausubel and HE Sladovich, eds.), Mr. Ausubel was one of the founders of the field of industrial ecology. With Arnulf Gruebler, Cesare Marchetti, and Nebojsa Nakicenovic he developed the concept of decarbonization, and with Robert Herman and Paul Waggoner the concept of dematerialization.

Ausubel also participated in the creation of and served as founding chair of the Encyclopedia of Life, a biodiversity web site modeled on Wikipedia, aimed at cataloging all known and named species on Earth. The project harnesses the resources of contributors worldwide to become the world's most comprehensive resource aimed at helping the scientific community, and others, gain a better understanding of the wide variety of life forms with which we share the planet.

Under the auspices of the Sloan Foundation, Ausubel participated in the development of an international program, titled the Census of Marine Life, to assess the diversity, distribution, and abundance of marine life—a task never before attempted on this scale. As an outcome of his deep involvement in the project, Ausubel also co-founded the movement in environmental genomics to develop very short DNA sequences for species identification, popularly referred to as the "Barcode of Life," championed by the Consortium for the Barcode of Life. Mr Ausubel has in recent years been involved with the establishment of the international Deep Carbon Observatory. He has also fostered the initiation of an International Quiet Ocean Experiment.

With William Massy, Trevor Chan, and Ben Sawyer, he developed and released in 2000 the first interactive simulation model of the US university, Virtual U.

== Recognition ==
A new genus and species of deep sea lobster discovered off the coast of Luzon, Philippines during the Census of Marine Life, was given the scientific name Dinochelus ausubeli and the common epithet of "Ausubel's Mighty Clawed Lobster" in his honour. For his contributions to environmental research, Dalhousie University (Canada) awarded him an honorary doctorate in 2009 and St. Andrews University (Scotland) in 2012. For his participation in the leadership of the Census of Marine Life, he shared the International Cosmos Prize in 2011. In 2012, The Urban Coast Institute at Monmouth University honored Ausubel with its National Ocean Champion Award.

In 2014, Ausubel was awarded the Paradigm Award by the Breakthrough Institute in recognition for his groundbreaking work on how humans liberate the environment. In April 2014 the Roman publisher Di Renzo published Ausubel's short autobiography in Italian, La liberazione dell'ambiente.

Also named for Mr. Ausubel is a new genus of Bryozoans, the Jessethoa, discovered and described by Dennis P. Gordon, taxonomist at New Zealand's National Institute of Water & Atmospheric Research. Small aquatic invertebrates with exoskeletons that typically sieve food particles out of the water with a crown of tentacles, the new Jessethoa Bryozoans are included in the World Registry of Marine Species. In 2022 the University of California at San Diego awarded Ausubel the Nierenberg Prize for Science in the Public Interest for conceiving, developing, and leading numerous projects to observe and better understand the environment.
