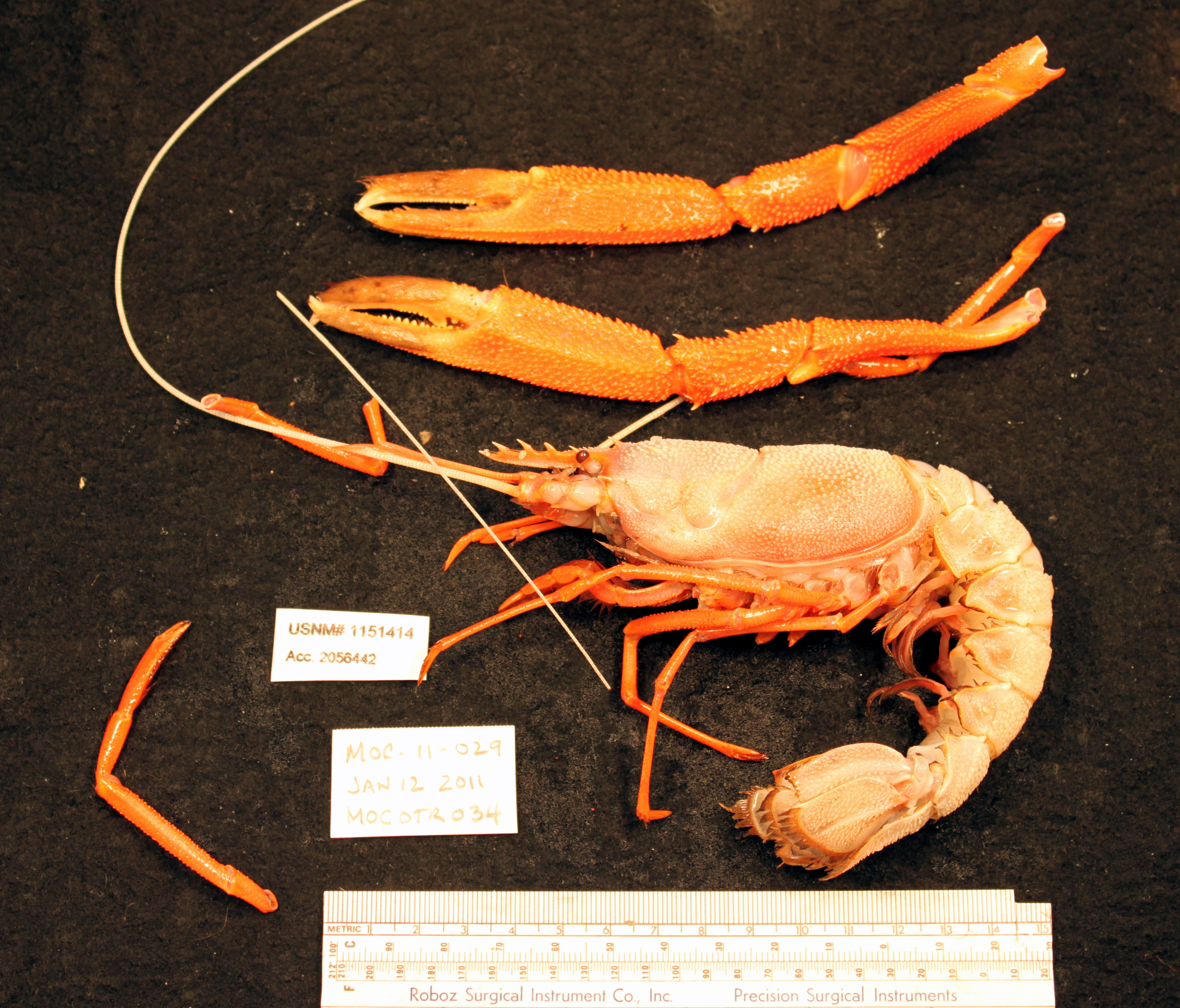
- Specimen of Nephropides caribaeus

Conservation status
- Data Deficient (IUCN 3.1)

Scientific classification
- Kingdom: Animalia
- Phylum: Arthropoda
- Class: Malacostraca
- Order: Decapoda
- Suborder: Pleocyemata
- Family: Nephropidae
- Genus: Nephropides; Manning, 1969
- Species: N. caribaeus

Binomial name
- Nephropides caribaeus Manning, 1969

= Nephropides =

Species of crustacean

Nephropides caribaeus is a species of lobster, the only species in the genus Nephropides. It is found in western parts of the Caribbean Sea, from Belize to Colombia. It grows to a total length of around 170 mm (6.7 in), and is covered in conspicuous tubercles.

== Description ==
Nephropides caribaeus is a narrow lobster, resembling Nephropsis or Nephrops. Adults of N. caribaeus are typically 155–170 millimetres (6.1–6.7 in) in total length, or 51–58 mm (2.0–2.3 in) in carapace length. It differs from Nephropsis in that the eyes contain pigment, which is lacking in Nephropsis. The rostrum has 2–3 lateral spines, but no spines on the lower edge. The whole body is covered in large tubercles, including the first pereiopods with their large chelae, and the other, smaller pereiopods.

== Distribution and ecology ==
Nephropides caribaeus is found in the western Caribbean Sea, and has been recorded from Belize to Colombia. It is a deep-water species, living on muddy bottoms at depths of 455–728 metres (1,493–2,388 ft).

== Taxonomic history ==
The genus Nephropides and the species N. caribaeus were both erected in 1969 by Raymond B. Manning. A second species later described in the genus has since been transferred to Thymops as Thymops birsteini. The Food and Agriculture Organization has assigned the species an English name of "mitten lobsterette". The type locality is at 12°25′N 82°15′W, off the coast of Nicaragua, at a depth of 546–582 metres (1,791–1,909 ft). The generic name Nephropides alludes to a close relationship with the genus Nephrops, while the specific epithet caribaeus is a reference to the Caribbean Sea.
