= Dinochelus =

Scientific classification
- Kingdom: Animalia
- Phylum: Arthropoda
- Clade: Pancrustacea
- Class: Malacostraca
- Order: Decapoda
- Suborder: Pleocyemata
- Family: Nephropidae
- Genus: Dinochelus; Ahyong, Chan & Bouchet, 2010
- Species: D. ausubeli

Binomial name
- Dinochelus ausubeli Ahyong, Chan & Bouchet, 2010

Deep sea lobster known from the Philippines

Type site- Luzon,

Dinochelus ausubeli is a small deep sea lobster discovered in 2007 in the Philippines during the Census of Marine Life and described in 2010 in the new genus Dinochelus. Its two claws are very different in size, are elongated, and bear many long teeth on the inner surface. It is sometimes dubbed the terrible claw lobster because of its claws.

== Description ==
Dinochelus ausubeli has a carapace length of around 31 millimetres (1.2 in), and is in life mostly translucent white, with reddish pink colouring near the middle of the carapace, on the tail fan, on the antennae, and on the first pereiopods (including the claws). Its two claws are very different in size.

== Distribution and discovery ==
Dinochelus ausubeli is only known from its type locality, 15°56′N 121°45′E, off the coast of Luzon in the Philippines. It was found by trawling at a depth of around 250 metres (820 ft) in 2007, as part of the Census of Marine Life, a major effort to document marine life in the first decade of the 21st century. It was described in 2010 by an international team of scientists.

== Taxonomy ==
The new species was placed in a separate genus, Dinochelus, whose name derives from the Greek roots δεινός (dinos), meaning "terrible" or "fearful", and χηλή (chela), meaning "claw". The specific epithet "ausubeli" honours Jesse H. Ausubel, the sponsor of the Census of Marine Life, "in recognition of his vision and support for marine biodiversity exploration".

Dinochelus belongs to a group of lobsters previously recognised as the separate family, Thaumastochelidae, which also includes the genera Thaumastocheles and Thaumastochelopsis. These genera all show very long, toothed claws with a bulbous base, with one claw much longer than the other. Dinochelus has features in common with each of those genera; on the basis of DNA sequencing using cytochrome oxidase I, Dinochelus is thought to be the sister taxon to Thaumostocheles + Thaumastochelopsis. It is distinguished from either genus by the unusual, T-shaped form of the epistome.
