= Homarus morrisi =

Homarus morrisi Temporal range: Ypresian–Bartonian

Scientific classification
- Kingdom: Animalia
- Phylum: Arthropoda
- Class: Malacostraca
- Order: Decapoda
- Suborder: Pleocyemata
- Family: Nephropidae
- Genus: Homarus
- Species: H. morrisi

Binomial name
- Homarus morrisi Quayle, 1987

Species of lobster

Homarus morrisi is a species of fossil lobster from the Eocene of southern England.

== Taxonomy ==
Specimens of H. morrisi were described as early as 1849, but were assigned to Hoploparia gammaroides rather than Homarus by scientists that included Frederick M'Coy and Thomas Bell. In 1987, W. J. Quayle recognised that the material then ascribed to Hoploparia gammaroides represented two species, and described the new species Homarus morrisi for those that didn't match the description of Hoploparia gammaroides. The specific epithet honours S. F. Morris of the Department of Palaeontology at the "British Museum (Natural History)" (now the Natural History Museum).

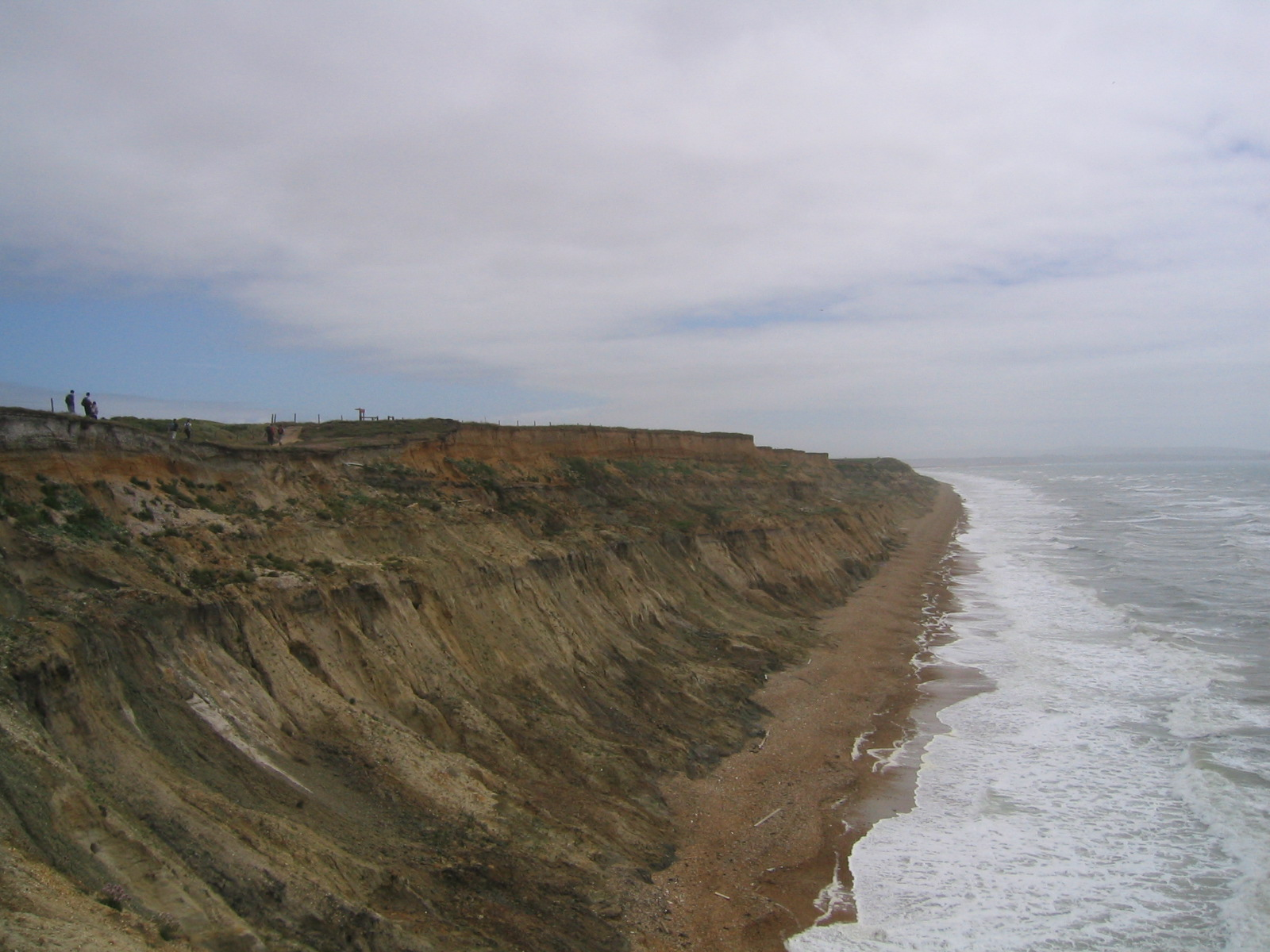
The Barton Beds at New Milton, Hampshire have yielded fossils of Homarus morrisi.

== Stratigraphy ==
Homarus morrisi has been found at a range of sites across Southern England. It occurs in the Ypresian London Clay at Bognor Regis, the Isle of Sheppey, London and sites across Essex, the Ypresian–Lutetian Bracklesham Group at Bracklesham Bay, Selsey and Whitecliff Bay (Isle of Wight), and in the Bartonian Barton Beds of Christchurch Bay, Hampshire.

== See also ==
- Hampshire Basin
- London Basin
