= Thaumastochelopsis wardi =

Scientific classification
- Kingdom: Animalia
- Phylum: Arthropoda
- Class: Malacostraca
- Order: Decapoda
- Suborder: Pleocyemata
- Family: Thaumastochelidae
- Genus: Thaumastochelopsis
- Species: T. wardi

Binomial name
- Thaumastochelopsis wardi Bruce, 1988

Species of blind lobster

Thaumastochelopsis wardi is a species of blind deep-sea lobster found in the Coral Sea.
