= List of halal fish =

Various types of fish are considered halal under sharia, Islamic law.

== Sunni views ==
In Sunni Islam, there are two general schools of thought. Most Sunni Muslim schools of jurisprudence (Shafi'i, Hanbali, and Maliki) hold as a general rule that all "sea game" (animals of the sea) are permissible to eat with a few minor exceptions. Thus, for example, the local dish Laksa (which includes meats such as shrimp and squid with a soup base made from shrimp paste), is deemed permissible in the Shafi'i Sunni Muslim majority nations of Indonesia and Malaysia where it is commonly consumed.

=== Hanafi views ===
In the Hanafi school, one of the four Sunni schools, only "fish" (as opposed to all "sea game") are permissible, including eel, croaker and hagfish.

Any other sea (or water) creatures that are not fish, therefore, are also makruh tahrimi (forbidden but not as the same level as haram) whether they breathe oxygen from water through gills (such as prawns, lobsters and crabs, which are crustaceans), molluscs such as clams, octopus, mussels and squid, especially if they breathe oxygen from air through lungs (such as sea turtles and sea snakes, which are reptiles, dolphins and whales, which are mammals, or semi-aquatic animals like penguins, which are birds, saltwater crocodiles, which are reptiles, seals, which are mammals, and frogs, which are amphibians).

In the Hanafi school of thought, there is a difference of opinion if shrimp and prawns are fish. Those who say they are halal say that the Arabs used to consider them fish, thus permissible. By contrast, others argue that prawns and shrimps are not actually fish, nor do they look like fish, so shrimps and prawns are not permissible. Additionally, the Hanafi scholars prohibit fish that died of natural causes and start to float on the surface of the water (also known as Samak-al-Tafi).

== Shia views ==
Under the Ja'fari jurisprudence followed by most Shia Muslims (including most Twelvers and Ismailis, the largest extant Shia sects), only certain fish are considered permissible for consumption. Any fish without scales are haram (forbidden) but fish that do have scales are permissible. Shia scholars tend to teach that no other aquatic creatures are halal, with the exception of certain edible aquatic crustaceans (e.g. shrimp but not crab), which are also Halal like scaled fish.

Ja'fari traditions require true fish scales. Specifically, Jafari Shia Islam excludes octopus.

The rules are relaxed in some Islamic schools of thought, both Shia and Sunni. Some have looser definitions that include the exoskeleton of crustaceans as "scales", others yet include the softer exoskeletons of prawns as "scales" but exclude the harder exoskeletons of lobsters. They also differ in the definition of fish, some adopting a loose definition to include all water life ("sea game").

== List of permitted fish ==
Type of sea creature	Hanafi	Shafi‘i	Maliki	Hanbali	Ja‘fari (Shia)
True fish	Halal (provided the animal is recognized as "fish", if possessing scales and fins)	Halal	Halal	Halal	Halal (only if it has scales)
Shellfish/Crustaceans	Generally not considered "true fish" and thus impermissible or at best makruh; nonetheless, there is a minority view among some Hanafi scholars that permits shrimp based on traditional usage.	Halal (sea creatures are included under "sea game")	Halal (a broad permissibility is maintained)	Halal (similar to the Shafi‘i and Maliki view)	Haram (with debate on shrimp)
Mollusks	Impermissible (not classified as "fish").	Halal	Halal	Halal	Impermissible (only true fish with scales are accepted).
Marine mammals	Generally avoided or deemed non-permissible since they do not fit the traditional definition of "fish".	Halal (the general ruling "what comes from the sea is lawful" applies)	Halal	Halal	Haram (not classified as fish with scales)
Amphibians	Haram (explicitly forbidden in hadith).	Haram	Haram	Haram	Haram
Reptiles	Haram (not considered part of the "sea game")	Haram	Haram	Haram	Haram
