= Thymopides =

Scientific classification
- Kingdom: Animalia
- Phylum: Arthropoda
- Class: Malacostraca
- Order: Decapoda
- Suborder: Pleocyemata
- Family: Nephropidae
- Genus: Thymopides; Burukovsky & Averin, 1977

Species
- Thymopides grobovi (Burukovsky & Averin, 1976); Thymopides laurentae Segonzac & Macpherson, 2003

Synonyms
- Bellator Burukovsky & Averin, 1976

Genus of lobsters

Thymopides is a genus of deep-water lobsters, comprising the two species Thymopides grobovi and Thymopides laurentae.

== Distribution ==
Two species are included in the genus Thymopides.

- Thymopides grobovi is found around Heard Island and the Kerguelen Archipelago in the southern Indian Ocean at depths of 525–1,220 metres (1,722–4,003 ft).
- Thymopides laurentae is only known from a single hydrothermal vent on the Mid-Atlantic Ridge at a depth of 3,480 m (11,420 ft) (23°22.94′N 44°56.09′W).

== Description ==
Thymopides differs from related genera such as Homarus, Homarinus and Nephrops in having the first pair of pereiopods of similar size and shape, rather than one "crusher" and one "cutter" claw. It differs from others, such as Metanephrops and Eunephrops by the lack of a carina behind the antennal spine, by the smaller size of some spines and by the smaller, unpigmented eyes.

== Taxonomy ==
The genus was first described by R. N. Burukovsky and B. S. Averin in 1976 under the name Bellator, the Latine word for "warrior", in a paper in the Russian Journal of Zoology (Зоологический Журнал, Zoologicheskij Zhurnal). After Lipke Holthuis informed the authors that a genus already existed called Bellator, they published a replacement name in a paper in the journal Crustaceana. That new name was Thymopides, referring to the close resemblance between the new genus and the genus Thymops.

In 2003, a second species was described, T. laurentae, commemorating Michèle de Saint Laurent.
