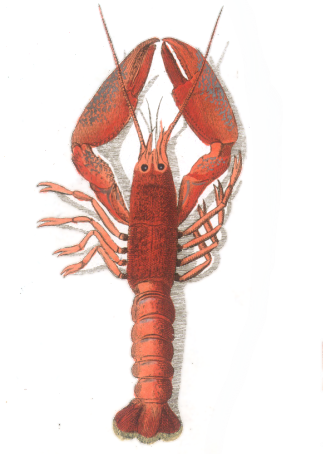
- Herbst's 1792 illustration (Note: Johann Friedrich Wilhelm Herbst reported that the Cape lobster has five pairs of claws, based on an illustration sent to him from Copenhagen. Later authors, including Thomas Roscoe Rede Stebbing, concluded that the illustrator must have made the error.)

Conservation status
- Data Deficient (IUCN 3.1)

Scientific classification
- Kingdom: Animalia
- Phylum: Arthropoda
- Class: Malacostraca
- Order: Decapoda
- Suborder: Pleocyemata
- Family: Nephropidae
- Genus: Homarinus; Kornfield, Williams & Steneck, 1995
- Species: H. capensis

Binomial name
- Homarinus capensis (Herbst, 1792)

Synonyms
- Cancer (Astacus) capensis Herbst, 1792; Astacus fulvus Fabricius, 1793; Homarus fulvus Weber, 1795; Astacus capensis Latreille, 1802; Cancer (Astacus) fulvusTurton, 1806

= Cape lobster =

Species of crustacean

The Cape lobster (Homarinus capensis) is a species of small lobster that lives off the coast of South Africa, from Dassen Island to Haga Haga. Only a few dozen specimens are known, mostly regurgitated by reef-dwelling fish. It lives in rocky reefs, and is thought to lay large eggs that have a short larval phase, or that hatch directly as a juvenile. The species grows to a total length of 10 cm (3.9 in), and resembles a small European or American lobster; it was previously included in the same genus, Homarus, although it is not very closely related to those species, and is now considered to form a separate, monotypic genus – Homarinus. Its closest relatives are the genera Thymops and Thymopides.

== Distribution and ecology ==
Extreme points of the range of Homarinus capensis in South Africa

The Cape lobster is endemic to South Africa. It occurs from Dassen Island, Western Cape in the west to Haga Haga, Eastern Cape in the east, a range of 900 kilometres (560 mi). Most of the known specimens were regurgitated by fish caught on reefs at depths of 20–40 metres (66–131 ft). This suggests that the Cape lobster inhabits rocky substrates, and may explain its apparent rarity, since such areas are not amenable to dredging or trawling, and the species may be too small to be retained by lobster traps.

== Description ==
Homarinus capensis is considerably smaller than the large northern lobsters of the Atlantic Ocean, Homarus gammarus (the European lobster) and Homarus americanus (the American lobster), at 8–10 centimetres (3.1–3.9 in) total length, or 4–5 cm (1.6–2.0 in) carapace length. Accounts of the colouration of H. capensis are very variable, from tawny, red or yellow to "a rather dark olive", similar to Homarus gammarus.

Homarinus and Homarus are considered to be the most plesiomorphic genera in the family Nephropidae. Nonetheless, the Cape lobster differs from Homarus in a number of characters. The rostrum of the Cape lobster is flattened, while that of Homarus is rounded in section, and curves upwards at the tip. The three pairs of claws are covered with hairs in Homarinus, while those of Homarus are hairless. The telson tapers along its length in Homarus, but has sides which are nearly parallel in Homarinus. Although no egg-bearing females have been collected, the gonopores (openings of the oviducts) of female Cape lobsters are much larger than those of Homarus gammarus and Homarus americanus. This is thought to indicate that Homarinus bears fewer, larger eggs than Homarus, and that either the larvae develop quickly into juveniles after hatching, or that the eggs hatch directly into juveniles.

== Taxonomy and evolution ==
Cape lobsters are elusive and rare, with only fourteen specimens having been collected between 1792 (the date of its first description) and 1992. These include five males in the collections of the South African Museum (Cape Town), two in the Natural History Museum (London), one in each of the East London Museum, the Rijksmuseum van Natuurlijke Historie (Leiden) and the Albany Museum (Grahamstown), and one male and one female in the Muséum national d'histoire naturelle (Paris). In 1992, a Cape lobster was discovered at Dassen Island, and the publicity the find generated resulted in more than 20 additional specimens being reported.

The Cape lobster was first described by Johann Friedrich Wilhelm Herbst in 1792 as Cancer (Astacus) capensis. It was independently described in 1793 by Johan Christian Fabricius as Astacus flavus, possibly based on the same type specimen. When Friedrich Weber erected the genus Homarus in 1795, he included Fabricius' species in it, but this placement was not followed by later authors. The species reached its current classification in 1995, when the monotypic genus Homarinus was erected by Irv Kornfield, Austin B. Williams and Robert S. Steneck.

While analyses of morphology suggest a close relationship between Homarinus and Homarus, molecular analyses using mitochondrial DNA reveal that they are not sister taxa. Both genera lack ornamentation such as spines and carinae, but are thought to have reached that state independently, through convergent evolution. The closest living relative of Homarus is Nephrops norvegicus, while the closest relatives of Homarinus are Thymops and Thymopides.
