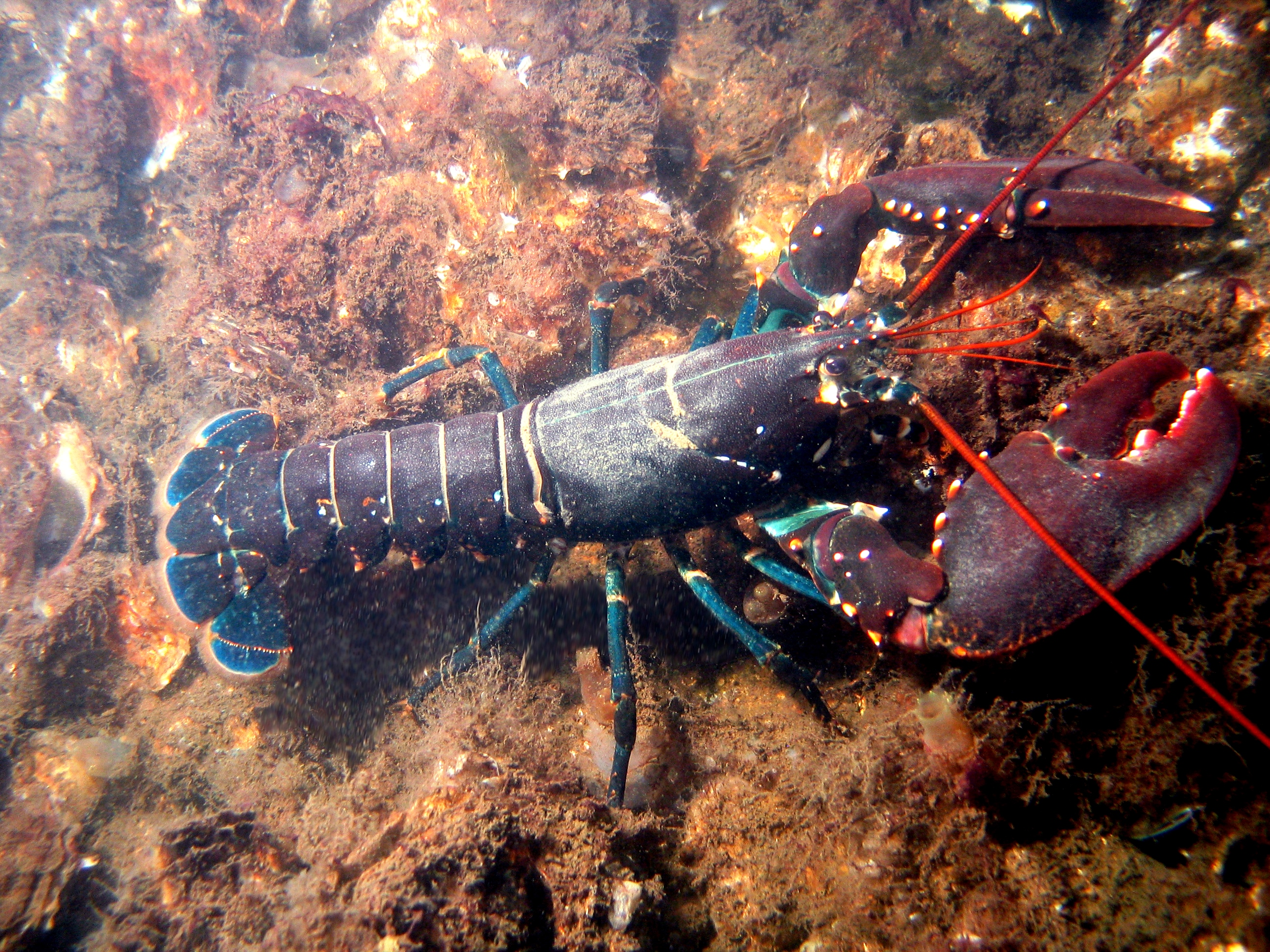
- Homarus gammarus

Scientific classification
- Kingdom: Animalia
- Phylum: Arthropoda
- Clade: Pancrustacea
- Class: Malacostraca
- Order: Decapoda
- Suborder: Pleocyemata
- Family: Nephropidae
- Genus: Homarus; Weber, 1795

Type species
- Astacus marinus Fabricius, 1775

Extant species
- H. americanus – American lobster H. gammarus – European lobster

= Homarus =

Homarus Temporal range: Albian–Recent

Genus of large lobsters

Homarus is a genus of lobsters which includes the common and commercially significant species Homarus americanus (the American lobster) and Homarus gammarus (the European lobster). The Cape lobster, which was formerly in this genus as H. capensis, was moved in 1995 to the new genus Homarinus.

== Description ==
Homarus is one of three extant genera of clawed lobsters to show dimorphism between claws – a specialisation into a crushing claw and a cutting claw. The other similar genera are Nephrops, which is much more slender, and has grooves along the claws and the abdomen, and Homarinus, the Cape lobster from South Africa, which is even smaller, and has hairy claws.

While analyses of morphology suggest a close relationship between Homarinus and Homarus, molecular analyses using mitochondrial DNA reveal that they are not sister taxa. Both genera lack ornamentation such as spines and carinae, but are thought to have reached that state independently, through convergent evolution. The closest living relative of Homarus is Nephrops norvegicus, while the closest relatives of Homarinus are Thymops and Thymopides.

== Species ==
Eight extinct species are known from the fossil record, which stretches back to the Cretaceous, but only two species survive. These two species, the American lobster and the European lobster, are very similar and may have speciated as recently as the Pleistocene, during climatic fluctuations. The best characters for distinguishing them are the geographic distribution, with the American lobster in the western Atlantic and the European lobster in the eastern Atlantic, and by the presence of one or more teeth on the underside of the rostrum in H. americanus but not in H. gammarus.

Image	Scientific name	Common name	Description	Distribution
	Homarus gammarus Linnaeus, 1758	European lobster or common lobster	may grow to a length of 60 cm (24 in) and a mass of 6 kilograms (13 lb), and bears a conspicuous pair of claws. In life, the lobsters are most of the time blue, only becoming "lobster red" on cooking. Homarus gammarus is a highly esteemed food, and is widely caught using lobster pots,	Mostly around the British Isles.
	Homarus americanus H. Milne-Edwards, 1837	Atlantic lobster, Canadian lobster, true lobster, northern lobster, Canadian Reds, or Maine lobster.	commonly ranges from 20–60 cm (8–24 in) in length and 0.5–4.1 kg (1.1–9.0 lb) in weight, but have been known to reach lengths of 64 cm (25 in) and weigh as much as 20 kg (44 lb) or more, making this the heaviest marine crustacean in the world. An average adult is about 23 cm (9 in) long and weighs 700–900 g (25–32 oz).	Atlantic coast of North America, from Labrador in the north to Cape Hatteras, North Carolina in the south

=== Fossil species ===
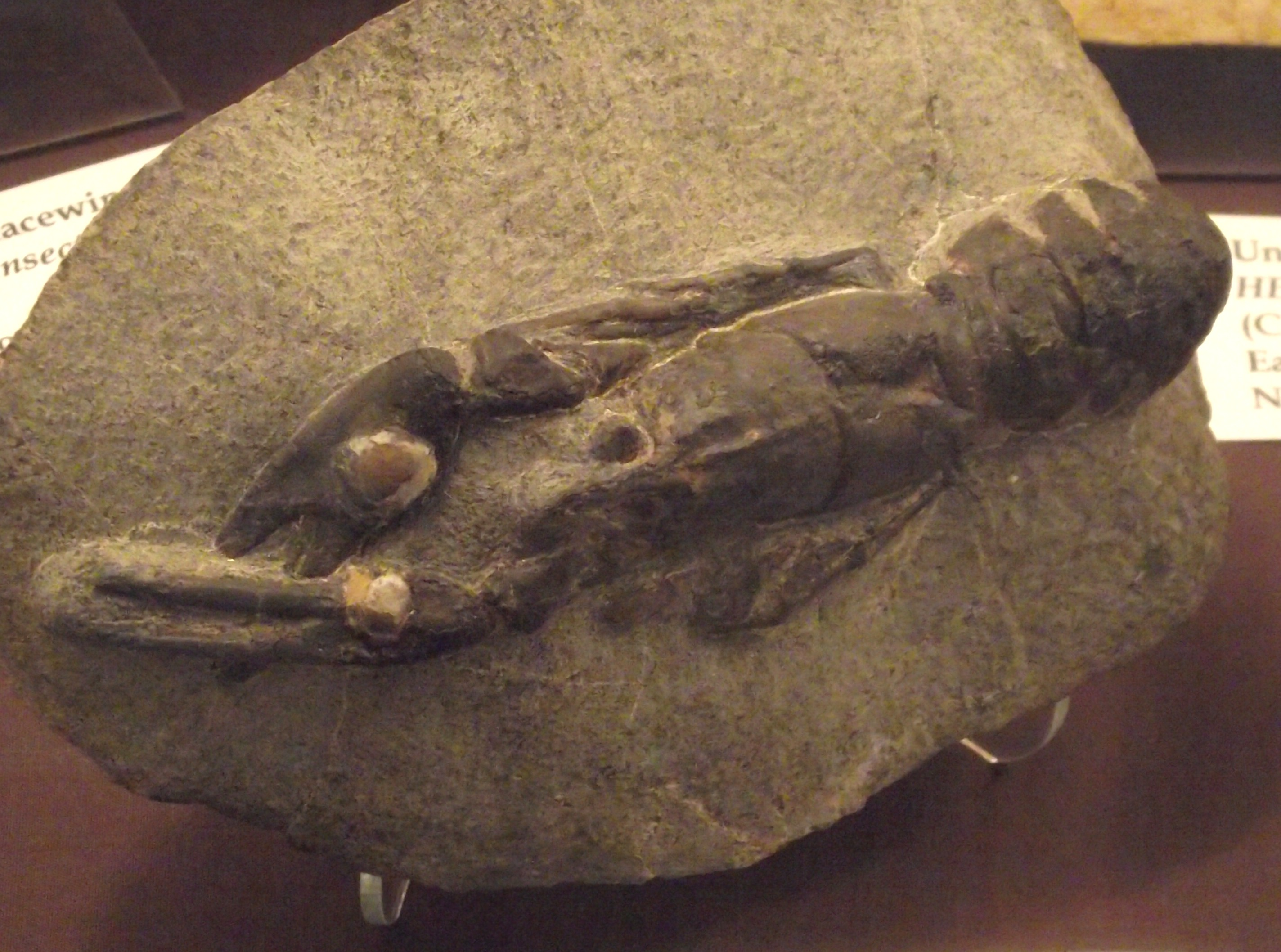
Fossil of Hoploparia bearpawensis; the relationships between Homarus and Hoploparia remain unclear.

The boundaries between Homarus and the extinct genus Hoploparia are unclear, and some species, such as Hoploparia benedeni have been transferred between the two genera. Eight species have been assigned to Homarus from the fossil record. They are: (Note: Stratigraphic ranges are from Tschudy (2003) and Polkowsky (2004).)

- Homarus brittonestris Stenzel, 1945 – lower Turonian
- Homarus davisi Stenzel, 1945 – lower Turonian
- Homarus fami Garassino, Pasini, Nyborg, Haggart, 2021 – Albian
- Homarus lehmanni Haas, 1889 – Rupelian
- Homarus mickelsoni (Bishop, 1985) – lower Campanian
- Homarus morrisi Quayle, 1987 – Eocene
- Homarus neptunianus Polkowsky, 2004 – Oligocene
- Homarus travisensis Stenzel, 1945 – middle Albian

== Distribution ==
The two extant species of Homarus are both found in the North Atlantic Ocean. H. americanus is found from Labrador to North Carolina in the western North Atlantic, while H. gammarus is found from Arctic Norway to Morocco, including the British Isles and the Mediterranean Sea.

== Life cycle ==
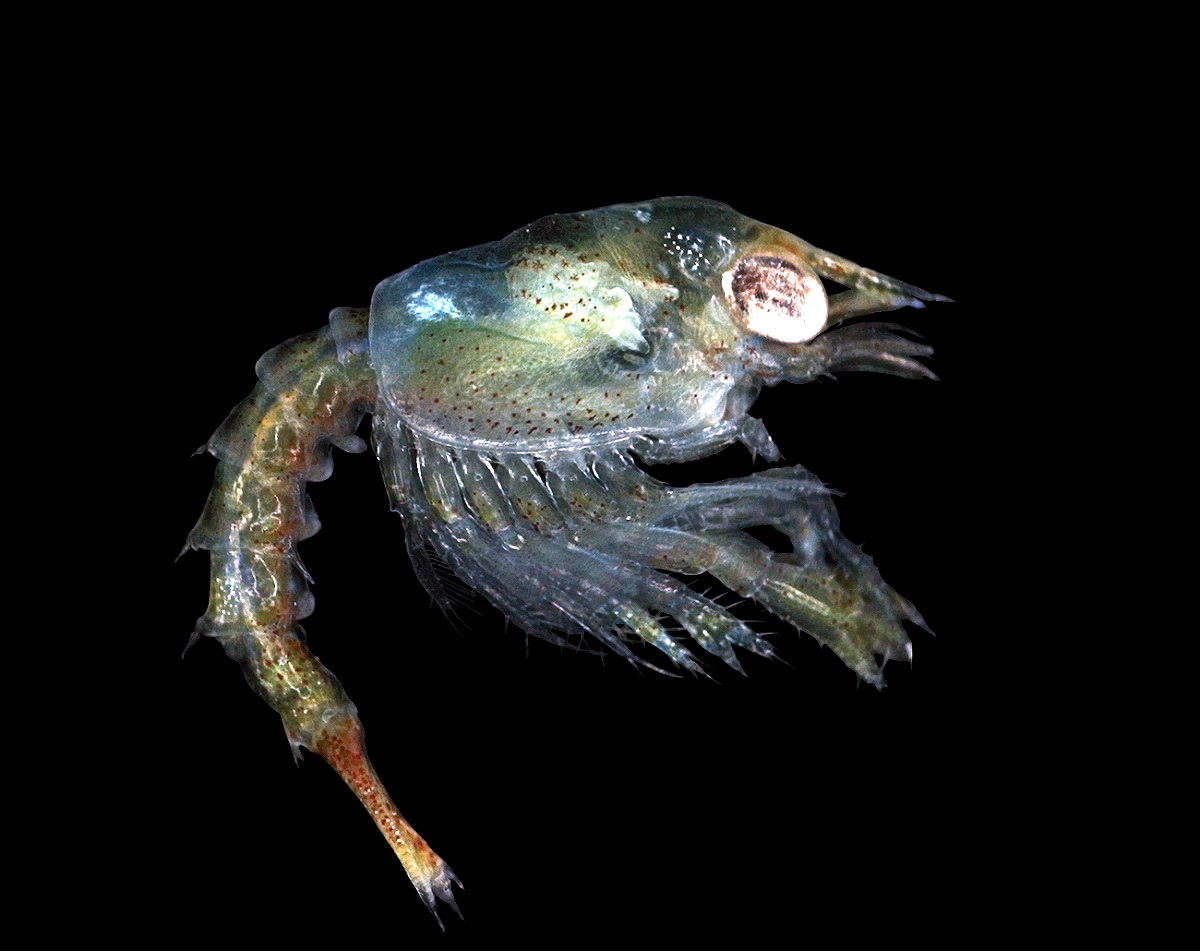
Zoea larva of H. gammarus

Mating in Homarus is complex and is accompanied by a number of courtship behaviours. Males build mating shelters or burrows, and larger males can attract more females, producing a polygynous mating system. A few days before moulting, a female will choose a mate, and will remain in his shelter until the moult. The male will then insert a spermatophore into the female's seminal vesicle, where it may be stored for several years. The eggs of Homarus species are laid in the autumn, being fertilised externally as they exit, and are carried by the female on her pleopods.

The eggs generally hatch in the spring as a pre-larva, which rapidly develops into the first larval phase. This is followed by three zoeal phases, the total duration of which can vary from two weeks to two months, depending on the temperature. At the following moult, the young animal becomes a post-larva, with a gross form resembling the adult lobster. Although it can swim, using its pleopods, the post-larva soon settles to the bottom and lives as a juvenile for 3–5 years.

As adults, Homarus species moult increasingly infrequently. The size at sexual maturity varies with temperature; it is around 70 mm (2.8 in) for female H. americanus in southern New England, but 100 mm (3.9 in) around the Bay of Fundy. In H. gammarus, the size at sexual maturity is less well defined, but is in the range 80–140 mm (3.1–5.5 in).
