= Lobster Lake =

Lake in the state of Minnesota, United States

- Location within Minnesota
- Location: Douglas County, Minnesota
- Coordinates: 45°52.5′N 95°32′W
- Type: lake

Lobster Lake is a lake in Douglas County, Minnesota, in the United States.

Lobster Lake was named from the resemblance of its outline to a lobster.

== See also ==
- List of lakes in Minnesota
