= Thymopsis nilenta =

Conservation status
- Least Concern (IUCN 3.1)

Scientific classification
- Kingdom: Animalia
- Phylum: Arthropoda
- Class: Malacostraca
- Order: Decapoda
- Suborder: Pleocyemata
- Family: Nephropidae
- Genus: Thymopsis; Holthuis, 1974
- Species: T. nilenta

Binomial name
- Thymopsis nilenta Holthuis, 1974

Species of lobster

Thymopsis nilenta is a species of lobster and the only species in the genus Thymopsis. It is found around the Falkland Islands and South Georgia at depths of 1,976 to 3,040 metres (6,483 to 9,974 ft). It reaches a total length of 15 centimetres (5.9 in), of which the carapace makes up about 5 to 6 cm (2.0 to 2.4 in). It is known from a total of four specimens collected from two localities.
