= Lobster (novel) =

2003 novella by Guillaume Lecasble

- Author: Guillaume Lecasble
- Publisher: Éditions du Seuil
- Publication date: 2003
- Media type: Print
- ISBN: 9782020557658

Lobster is a French novella by Guillaume Lecasble. It was published in Paris by Les Éditions du Seuil in 2003, and has been translated into English and Spanish.

== Reception ==
Nicholas Lezard, in The Guardian, said of the English translation: "there was a Lobster-shaped hole in world literature which has now been neatly filled by this remarkable work". In The Daily Telegraph, Sam Leith put it in a list of 'Mad Stuff'. Kirkus Reviews called it a "brief, bizarre, boiling broth of surrealism, romantic fatalism and slapstick", and Publishers Weekly said it was "both tender and appalling".
