= Nephropsis atlantica =

Conservation status
- Least Concern (IUCN 3.1)

Scientific classification
- Kingdom: Animalia
- Phylum: Arthropoda
- Class: Malacostraca
- Order: Decapoda
- Suborder: Pleocyemata
- Family: Nephropidae
- Genus: Nephropsis
- Species: N. atlantica

Binomial name
- Nephropsis atlantica Norman, 1882

Species of lobster

Nephropsis atlantica, sometimes called the scarlet lobsterette or scarlet clawed lobster, is a species of lobster from the Atlantic Ocean.

== Description ==
Nephropsis atlantica is relatively small for a lobster, growing to a maximum total length of 103 millimetres (4.1 in). The eyes are unpigmented, in contrast to shallow-water species, and the carapace, abdomen and chelae are covered in setae (bristles).

== Distribution ==
Nephropsis atlantica is found on muddy substrates in deep waters of the eastern Atlantic Ocean, from the Faroe Islands to Namibia. (Note: Records of N. atlantica from the Indo-Pacific are thought to be misidentifications of Nephropsis sulcata.) It has been recorded at depths of 470–1,804 metres (1,500–5,900 ft), but is most frequent at 900–1,000 m (3,000–3,300 ft). It is one of only three clawed lobsters in the north-east Atlantic Ocean (the others being Homarus gammarus and Nephrops norvegicus), and the only one which is not the subject of commercial fishery.

== Taxonomy ==
Nephropsis atlantica was first described by the Reverend Canon Alfred Merle Norman in a report sent to Charles Wyville Thomson in 1880, and published in the Proceedings of the Royal Society of Edinburgh in 1882. The report was one of several published simultaneously on the various organisms dredged up by the ship Knight Errant in the Faroe–Shetland Channel. Norman's report opens "I send a list; it is a very interesting one", and goes on to detail species known from previous expeditions to the North Atlantic and three new species – Ampelisca compacta (Amphipoda: Ampeliscidae), Halirages elegans (Amphipoda: Calliopiidae) and Nephropsis atlantica. The type specimens were collected on August 10, 1880 at 59°33′N 7°14′W at a depth of 555 fathoms (3,330 ft; 1,015 m); they are presumed to have been lost since.
