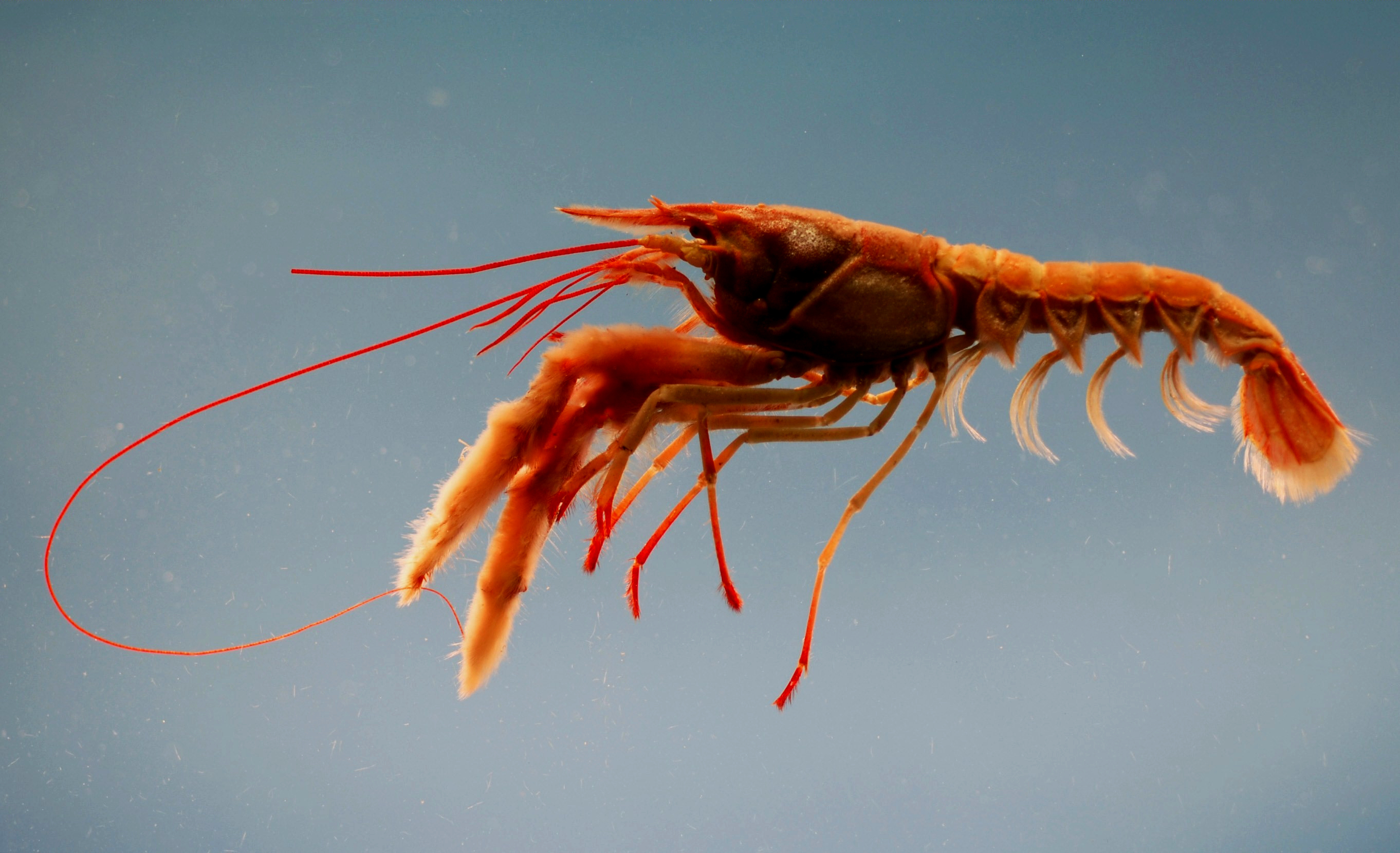

Conservation status
- Least Concern (IUCN 3.1)

Scientific classification
- Kingdom: Animalia
- Phylum: Arthropoda
- Class: Malacostraca
- Order: Decapoda
- Suborder: Pleocyemata
- Family: Nephropidae
- Genus: Nephropsis
- Species: N. rosea

Binomial name
- Nephropsis rosea Bate, 1888

= Nephropsis rosea =

Species of lobster

Nephropsis rosea, sometimes called the rosy lobsterette or two-toned lobsterette, is a species of lobster.

== Distribution and habitat ==
It is found in the Caribbean Sea and Gulf of Mexico, and as far north in the western Atlantic Ocean as Bermuda, and as far south as Guiana. It mostly lives at depths of 500–800 metres (1,600–2,600 ft), but has been observed between 420 and 1,280 metres (1,380 and 4,200 ft).

== Size ==
N. rosea reaches a carapace length of 1–6 centimetres (0.39–2.36 in), or a total length of 2–13 centimetres (0.79–5.12 in).
