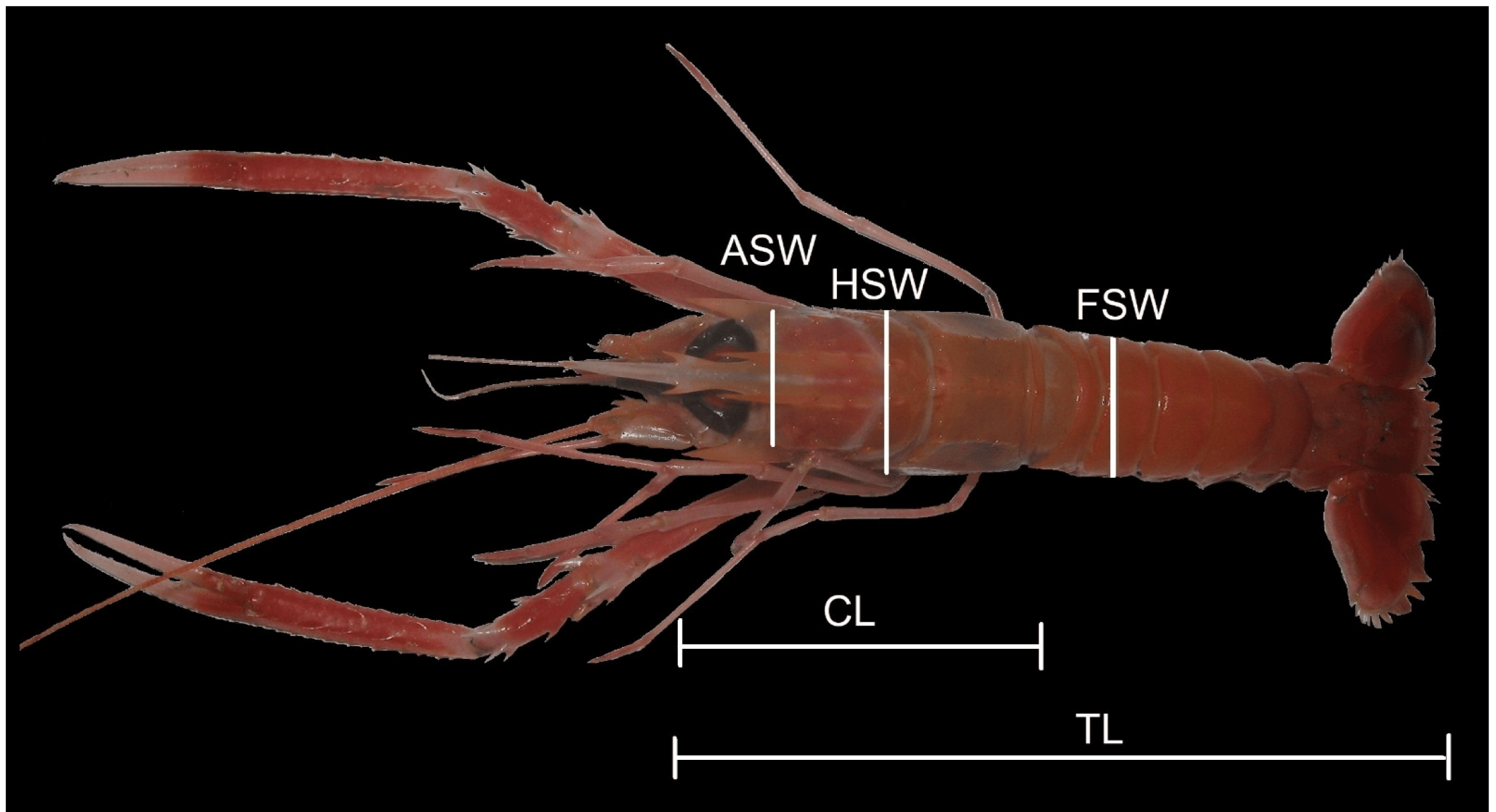

Conservation status
- Least Concern (IUCN 3.1)

Scientific classification
- Kingdom: Animalia
- Phylum: Arthropoda
- Class: Malacostraca
- Order: Decapoda
- Suborder: Pleocyemata
- Family: Nephropidae
- Genus: Metanephrops
- Species: M. binghami

Binomial name
- Metanephrops binghami (Boone, 1927)

Synonyms
- Nephrops binghami Boone, 1927

= Metanephrops binghami =

Species of lobster

Metanephrops binghami, the Caribbean lobster or Caribbean lobsterette, is a lobster that inhabits the western Atlantic region: from the Bahamas and southern Florida to French Guiana, including the Gulf of Mexico and the Caribbean Sea.
