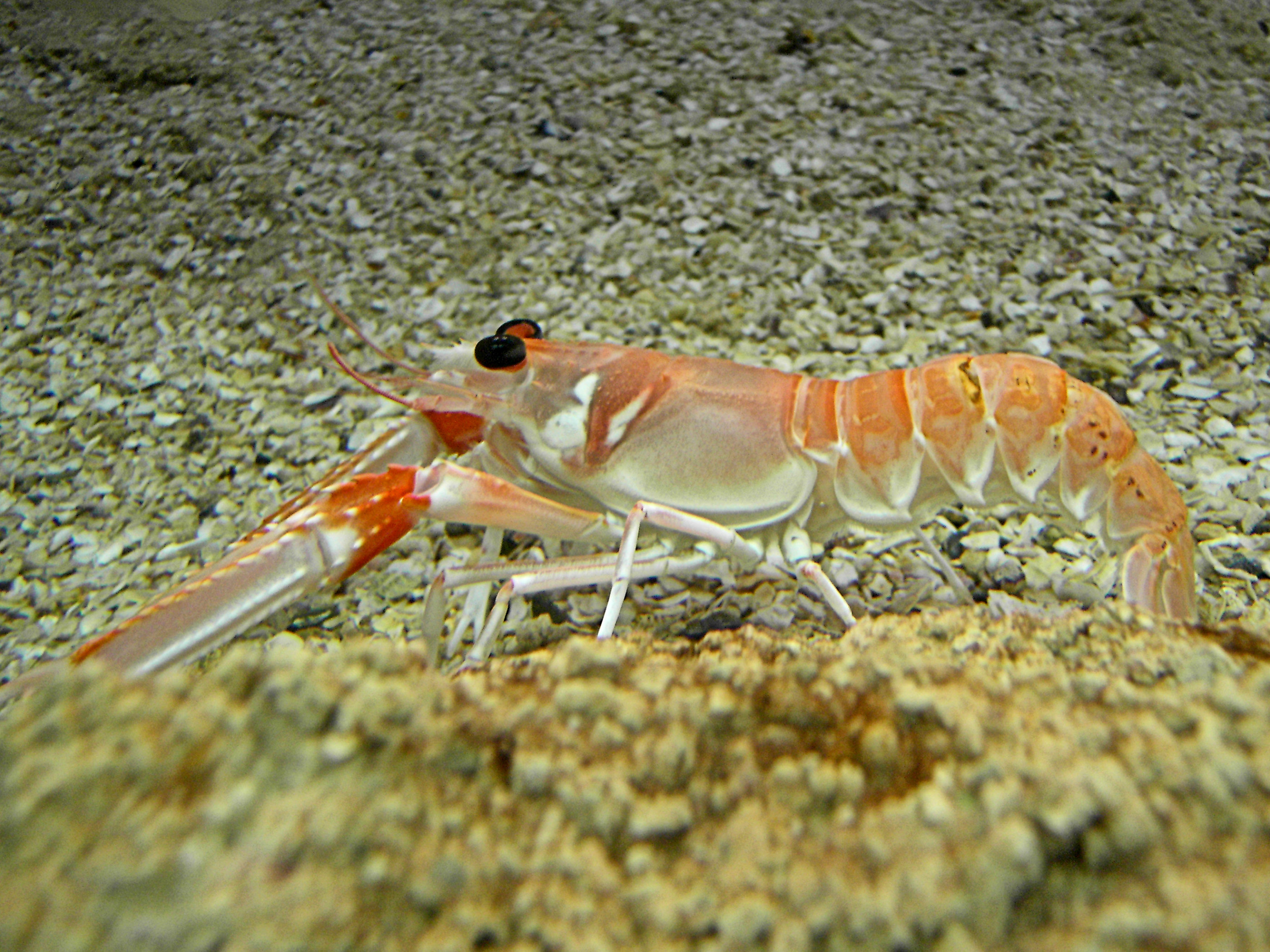
- Nephrops norvegicus

Scientific classification
- Kingdom: Animalia
- Phylum: Arthropoda
- Clade: Pancrustacea
- Class: Malacostraca
- Order: Decapoda
- Suborder: Pleocyemata
- Family: Nephropidae
- Genus: Nephrops; Leach, 1814

Type species
- Nephrops norvegicus Linnaeus, 1758

= Nephrops =

Nephrops Temporal range: Oligocene–Recent

Genus of lobsters

Nephrops is a genus of lobsters comprising a three extant species and several fossil species. The best known is Nephrops norvegicus, the Norway lobster or Dublin Bay prawn. It was erected by William Elford Leach in 1814, to accommodate N. norvegicus alone, which had previously been placed in genera such as Cancer, Astacus or Homarus. The genus name Nephrops comes from Ancient Greek νεφρός (nephrós) 'kidney', and ὄψ (óps) 'eye', and refers to the shape of the animal's compound eye.

Although the species in the genus Metanephrops were previously included in Nephrops, molecular phylogenetics suggests that the two genera are not sister taxa, Nephrops being more closely related to Homarus than either is to Metanephrops.

The extant species with taxonomic authority and common name:

- Nephrops japonicus Tapparone Canefri, 1873
- Nephrops norvegicus (Linnaeus, 1758) — Norway lobster
- Nephrops thompsoni (Bate, 1888)

Most of the fossil species assigned to the genus Nephrops are known only from partial remains, and their affinities are not certain. They include:

- Nephrops reedi Carter, 1898 – Pliocene, England
- Nephrops costatus Rathbun, 1918 – Pleistocene, Panama
- Nephrops maoensis Rathbun, 1920 – Oligocene or Miocene, Dominican Republic
- Nephrops aequus Rathbun, 1920 – Oligocene or Miocene, Dominican Republic
- Nephrops shastensis Rathbun, 1929 – Cretaceous, California (possibly belongs in Hoploparia)
- Nephrops americanus Rathbun, 1935 – Cretaceous, Texas (not similar to Nephrops or Metanephrops)
