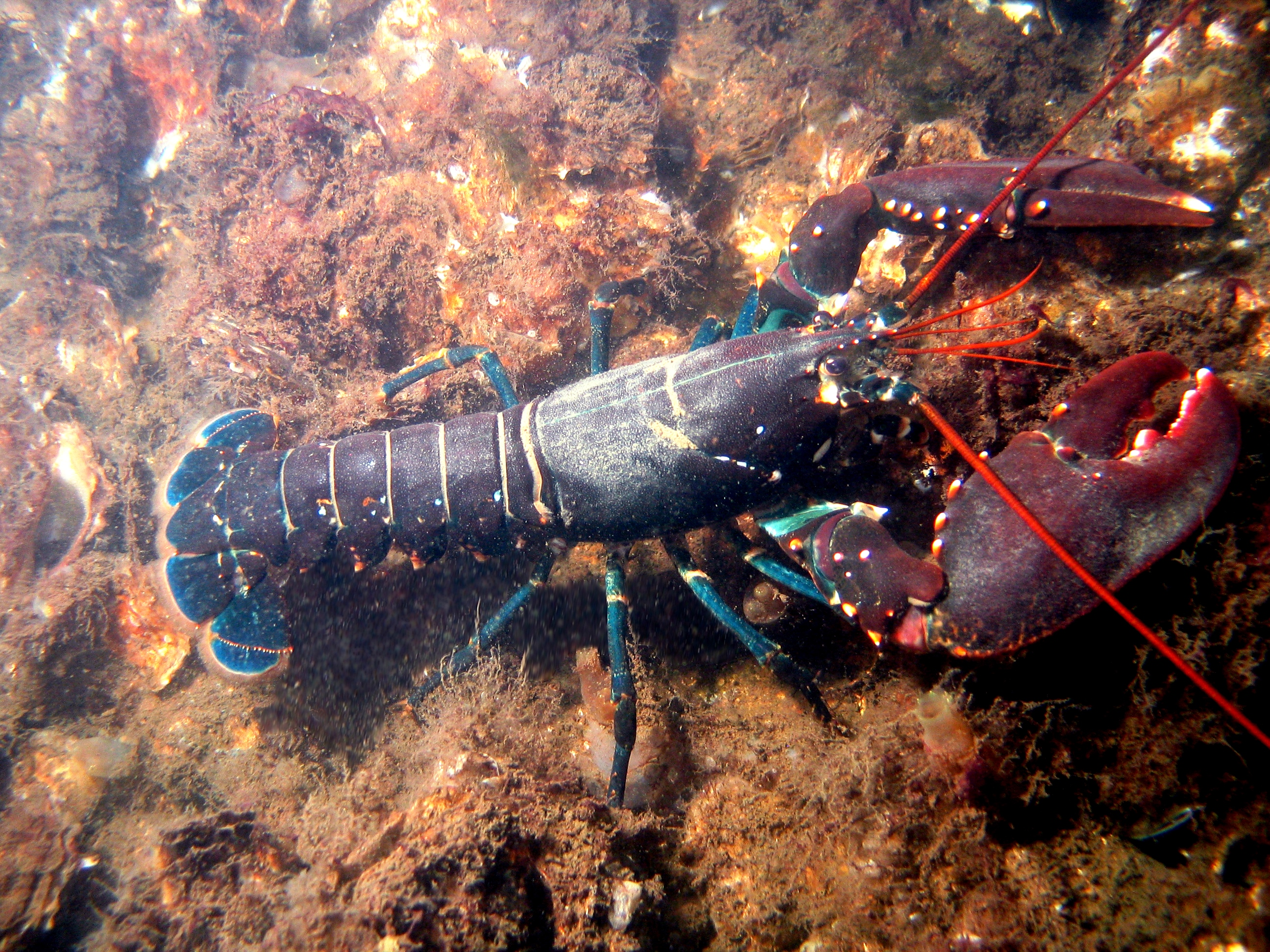
- European lobster (Homarus gammarus)

Scientific classification
- Kingdom: Animalia
- Phylum: Arthropoda
- Clade: Pancrustacea
- Class: Malacostraca
- Order: Decapoda
- Suborder: Pleocyemata
- Superfamily: Nephropoidea
- Family: Nephropidae; Dana, 1852

Genera
- List: Acanthacaris Bate, 1888; Dinochelus Ahyong, Chan & Bouchet, 2010; Eunephrops Smith, 1885; Homarinus Kornfield, Williams & Steneck, 1995; Homarus Weber, 1795; Hoploparia † M'Coy, 1849; Jagtia † Tshudy & Sorhannus, 2000; Metanephrops Jenkins, 1972; Nephropides Manning, 1969; Nephrops Leach, 1814; Nephropsis Wood-Mason, 1873; Oncopareia † Bosquet, 1854; Palaeonephrops † Mertin, 1941; Paraclythia † Fritsch & Kafka, 1887; Pseudohomarus † van Hoepen, 1962; Thaumastocheles Wood-Mason, 1874; Thaumastochelopsis Bruce, 1988; Thymopides Burukovsky & Averin, 1977; Thymops Holthuis, 1974; Thymopsis Holthuis, 1974

Synonyms
- Homaridae

= Lobster =

Lobster Temporal range: Valanginian–Recent

Family of clawed marine crustaceans

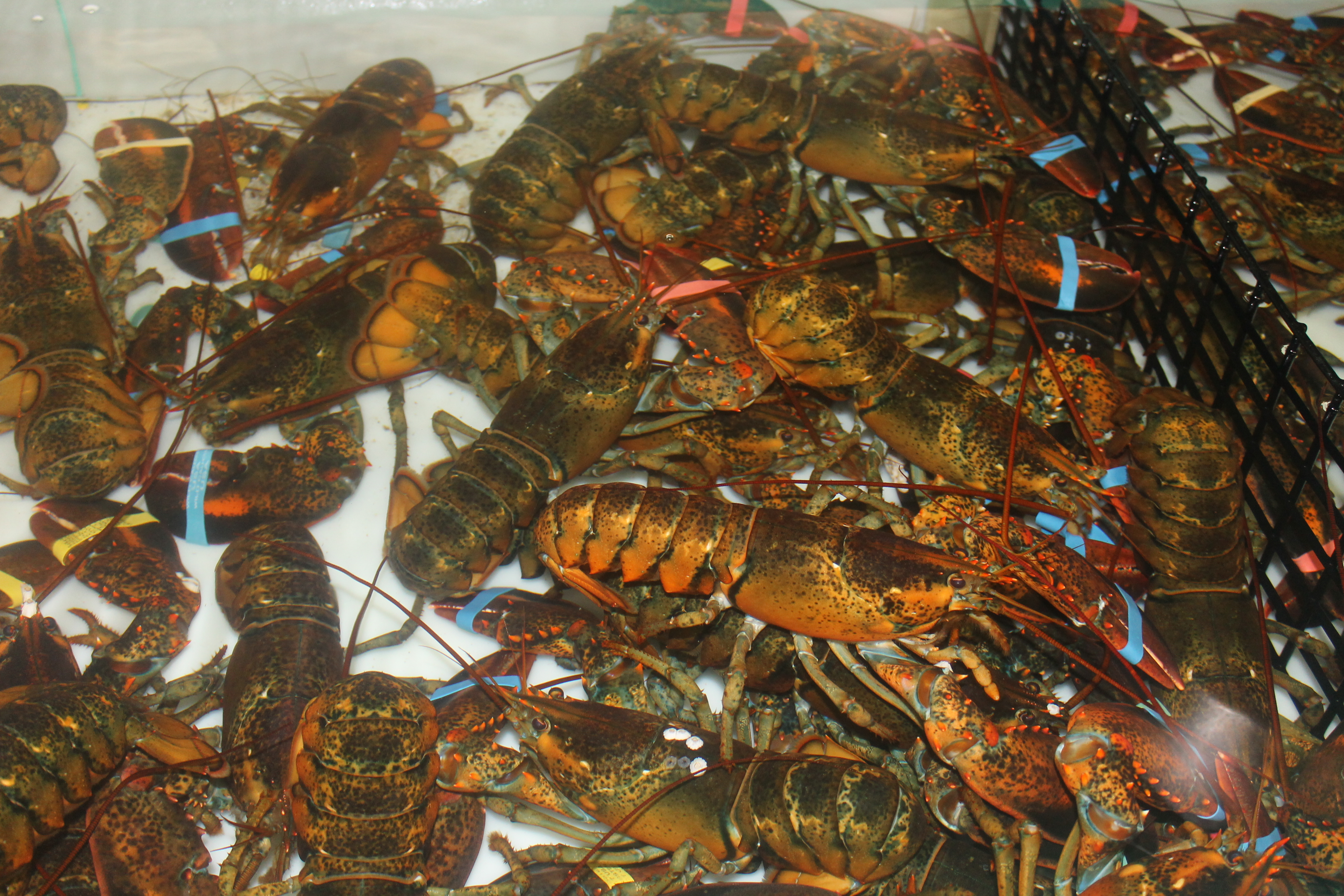
Lobsters awaiting purchase in Trenton, Maine

Lobsters are malacostracan decapod crustaceans of the family Nephropidae or its synonym Homaridae. They have long bodies with muscular tails and live in crevices or burrows on the sea floor. Three of their five pairs of legs have claws, including the first pair, which are usually much larger than the others. Highly prized as seafood, lobsters are economically important and are often one of the most profitable commodities in the coastal areas they populate.

Commercially important species include two species of Homarus from the northern Atlantic Ocean; the smaller Nephrops norvegicus, known as true scampi, Norway lobster, or langoustine; and multiple small species in the genus Metanephrops, commonly called Pacific scampi.

== Distinction ==
Although several other groups of crustaceans have the word "lobster" in their names, the unqualified term "lobster" generally refers to the clawed lobsters of the family Nephropidae. Clawed lobsters are not closely related to langustas (spinys and slipper lobsters), which have no claws (chelae), or to squat lobsters. The most similar living relatives of clawed lobsters are the reef lobsters and the three families of freshwater crayfish.

In the United States, the only species whose Acceptable Market Names are "lobster" with no qualification are the Homarus species: H. gammarus (European Lobster) and H. americanus (American lobster).

In culinary contexts, the unqualified term "lobster" almost always means the American lobster in North America and the European lobster in Great Britain. Qualified names are used for other species, whether they are clawed lobsters in the Nephropidae family (like Norway lobster, Nephrops norvegicus) or not (like spiny lobster).

In the Caribbean, Panulirus argus is formally called the spiny lobster, but informally simply "lobster".

In other English-speaking areas, the unqualified term "lobster" is rarely used.

== Description ==
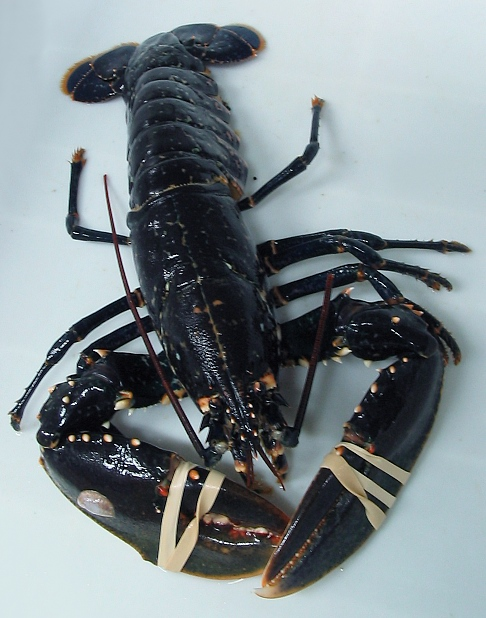
European lobster with cut antennae

=== Body ===
Lobsters are invertebrates with a hard protective exoskeleton. Like most arthropods, lobsters must shed to grow, which leaves them vulnerable. During the shedding process, several species change color. Lobsters have eight walking legs; the front three pairs bear claws, the first of which are larger than the others. The front pincers are also biologically considered legs, so they belong in the order Decapods ("ten-footed"). Although lobsters are largely bilaterally symmetrical like most other arthropods, some genera possess unequal, specialized claws.

Lobster anatomy includes two main body parts: the cephalothorax and the abdomen. The cephalothorax fuses the head and the thorax, both of which are covered by a chitinous carapace. The lobster's head bears antennae, antennules, mandibles, the first and second maxillae. The head also bears the (usually stalked) compound eyes. Because lobsters live in murky environments at the bottom of the ocean, they mostly use their antennae as sensors. The lobster eye has a reflective structure above a convex retina. In contrast, most complex eyes use refractive ray concentrators (lenses) and a concave retina. The lobster's thorax is composed of maxillipeds, appendages that function primarily as mouthparts, and pereiopods, appendages that serve for walking and for gathering food. The abdomen includes pleopods (also known as swimmerets), used for swimming, as well as the tail fan, composed of uropods and the telson.

Lobsters, like snails and spiders, have blue blood due to the presence of hemocyanin, which contains copper. In contrast, vertebrates, and many other animals have red blood from iron-rich hemoglobin. Lobsters possess a green hepatopancreas, called the tomalley in culinary usage, which functions as the animal's liver and pancreas.

Lobsters of the family Nephropidae are similar in overall form to several other related groups. They differ from freshwater crayfish in lacking the joint between the last two segments of the thorax, and they differ from the reef lobsters of the family Enoplometopidae in having full claws on the first three pairs of legs, rather than just one. The distinctions from fossil families such as the Chilenophoberidae are based on the pattern of grooves on the carapace.

Analysis of the neural gene complement revealed extraordinary development of the chemosensory machinery, including a profound diversification of ligand-gated ion channels and secretory molecules.

== Longevity ==
Lobsters live up to an estimated 45 to 50 years in the wild, although determining age is difficult: it is typically estimated from size and other variables. Newer techniques may lead to more accurate age estimates.

Research suggests that lobsters may not slow down, weaken, or lose fertility with age and that older lobsters may be more fertile than younger lobsters. This longevity may be due to telomerase, an enzyme that repairs long repetitive sections of DNA sequences at the ends of chromosomes, the telomeres. Telomerase is expressed by most vertebrates during embryonic stages but is generally absent from adult stages of life. However, unlike most vertebrates, lobsters express telomerase as adults through most tissue, which has been suggested to be related to their longevity. Lobster longevity is limited by their size. Moulting requires metabolic energy, and the larger the lobster, the more energy is needed; 10 to 15% of lobsters die of exhaustion during moulting, while in older lobsters, moulting ceases and the exoskeleton degrades or collapses entirely, leading to death.

Like many decapod crustaceans, lobsters grow throughout life and can add new muscle cells at each moult. Lobster longevity allows them to reach impressive sizes. According to Guinness World Records, the largest lobster ever caught was in Nova Scotia, Canada, in 1977, weighing 20.15 kilograms (44.4 lb).

== Ecology ==
Lobsters live in all oceans, on rocky, sandy, or muddy bottoms from the shoreline to beyond the edge of the continental shelf, contingent largely on size and age. Smaller, younger lobsters are typically found in crevices or in burrows under rocks and do not typically migrate. Larger, older lobsters are more likely to be found in deeper seas, migrating back to shallow waters seasonally.

Lobsters are omnivores and typically eat live prey such as fish, mollusks, other crustaceans, worms, and some plant life. They scavenge if necessary and are known to resort to cannibalism in captivity. However, when lobster skin is found in lobster stomachs, this is not necessarily evidence of cannibalism because lobsters eat their shed skin after moulting. While cannibalism was thought to be nonexistent among wild lobster populations, it was observed in 2012 by researchers studying wild lobsters in Maine. These first known instances of lobster cannibalism in the wild are theorized to be attributed to a local population explosion among lobsters caused by the disappearance of many of the Maine lobsters' natural predators.

In general, lobsters are 25–50 cm (10–20 in) long and move by slowly walking on the sea floor. However, they swim backward quickly when they flee by curling and uncurling their abdomens. A speed of 5 m/s (11 mph) has been recorded. This is known as the caridoid escape reaction.

Symbiotic animals of the genus Symbion, the only known member of the phylum Cycliophora, live exclusively on lobster gills and mouthparts. Different species of Symbion have been found on the three commercially important lobsters of the North Atlantic Ocean: Nephrops norvegicus, Homarus gammarus, and Homarus americanus.

== As food ==
Lobster is commonly served boiled or steamed in the shell. Diners crack the shell with lobster crackers and fish out the meat with lobster picks. The meat is often eaten with melted butter and lemon juice. Lobster is also used in soup, bisque, lobster rolls, cappon magro, and dishes such as lobster Newberg and lobster Thermidor.

Cooks primarily boil or steam live lobsters. When a lobster is cooked, its shell's color changes from brown to orange because the heat from cooking breaks down a protein called crustacyanin, which suppresses the orange hue of the chemical astaxanthin, which is also found in the shell.

According to the United States Food and Drug Administration (FDA), the mean level of mercury in American lobster between 2005 and 2007 was 0.107 ppm. (The FDA has set a maximum permissible level of methylmercury in seafood to 1 ppm.)

As a crustacean, lobster remains a taboo food in the dietary laws of Judaism and certain streams of Islam. (Note: See also: Kashrut, Halal, List of halal fish, and Kosher animals#Water creatures)

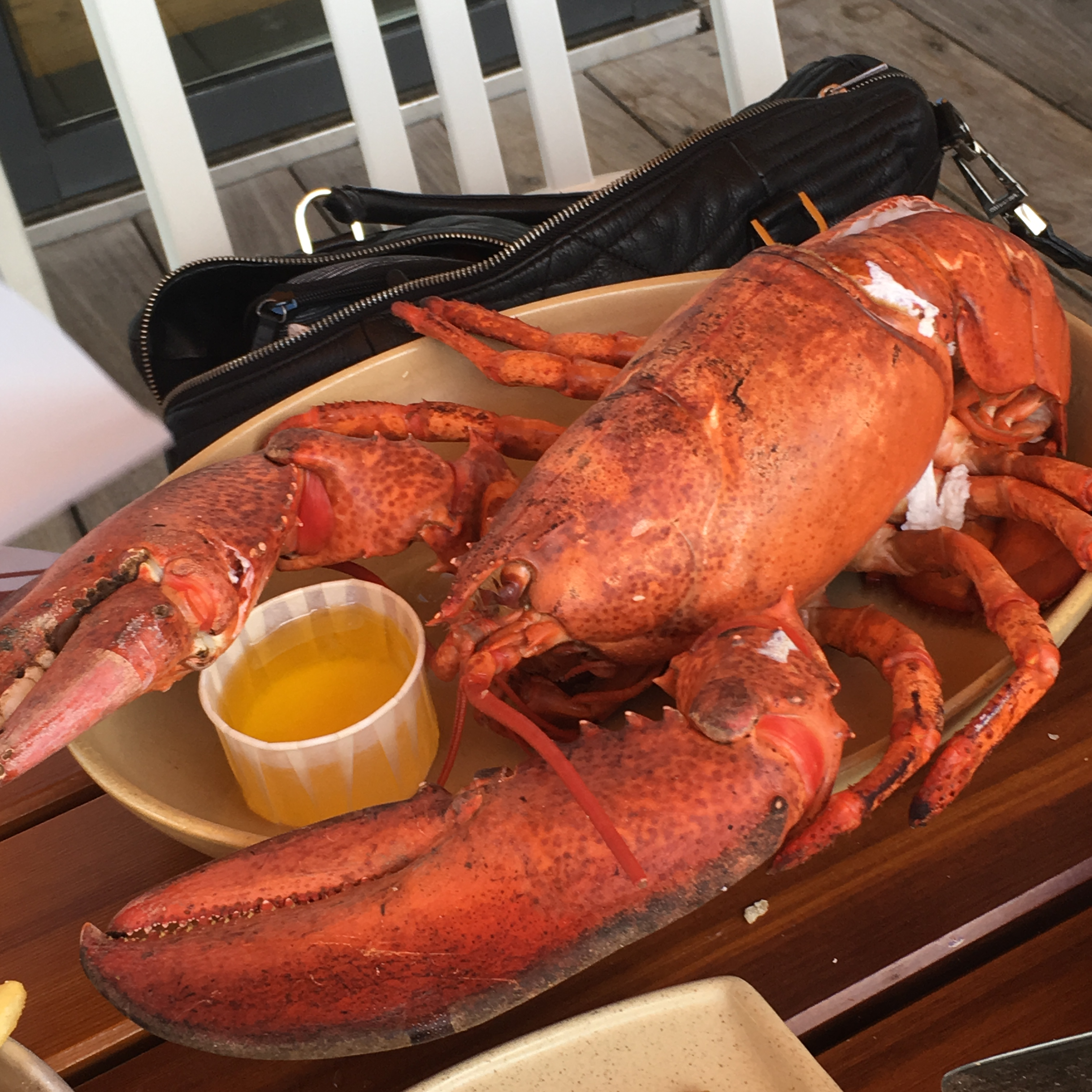
Boiled lobster ready for eating

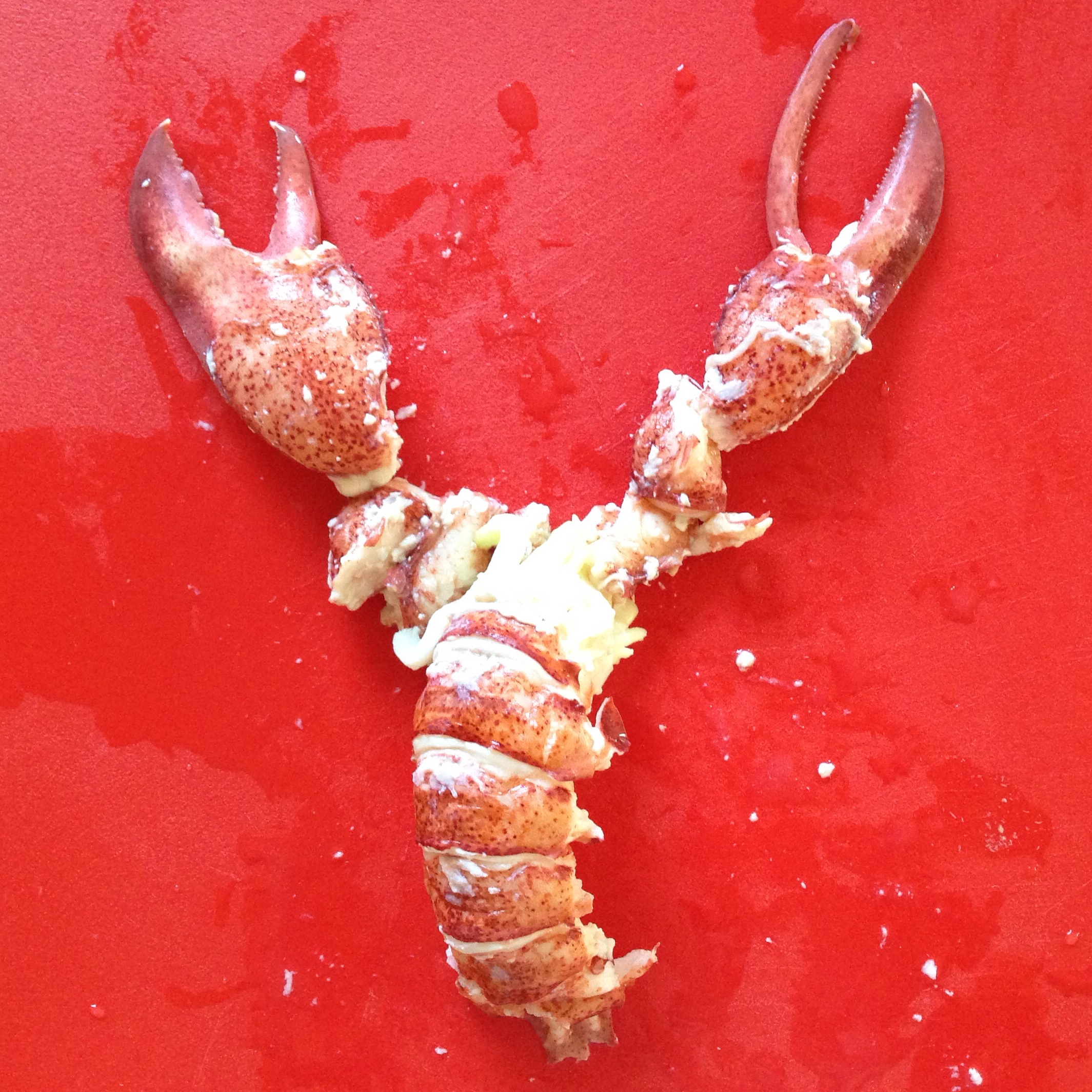
Lobster meat

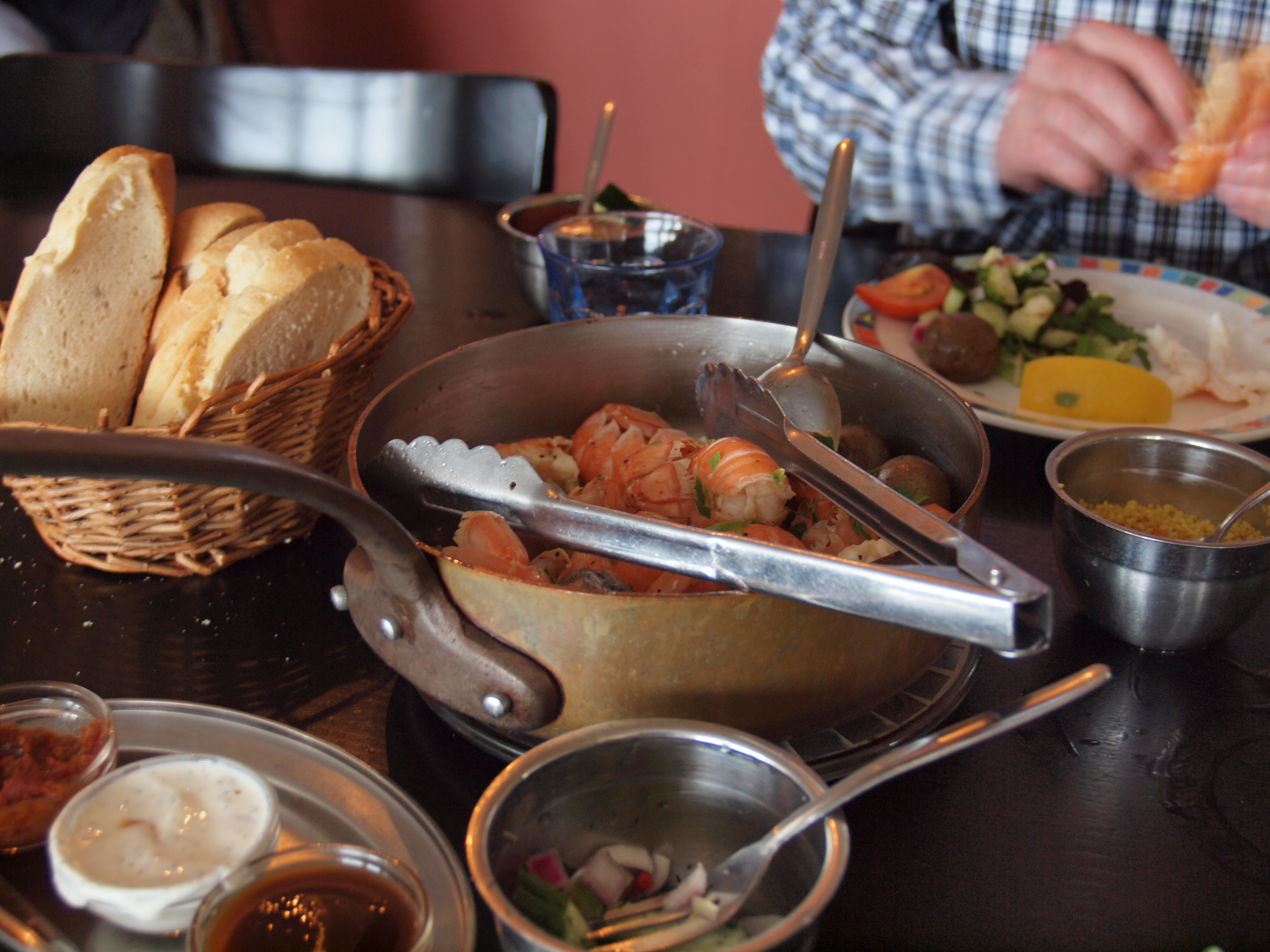
Lobster served in Stokkseyri, Iceland

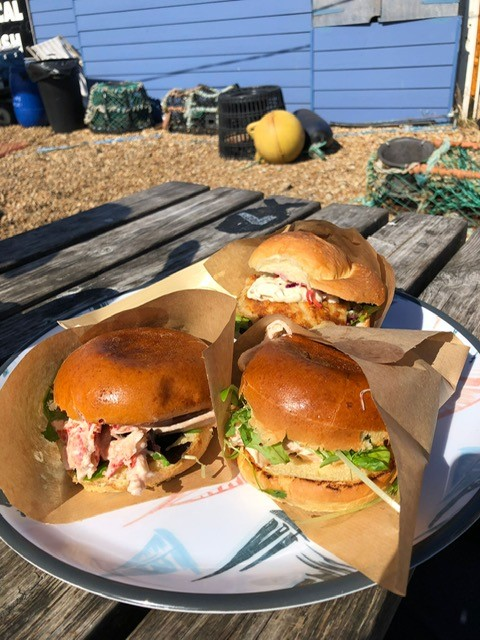
Lobster rolls in Kent, England

=== History ===
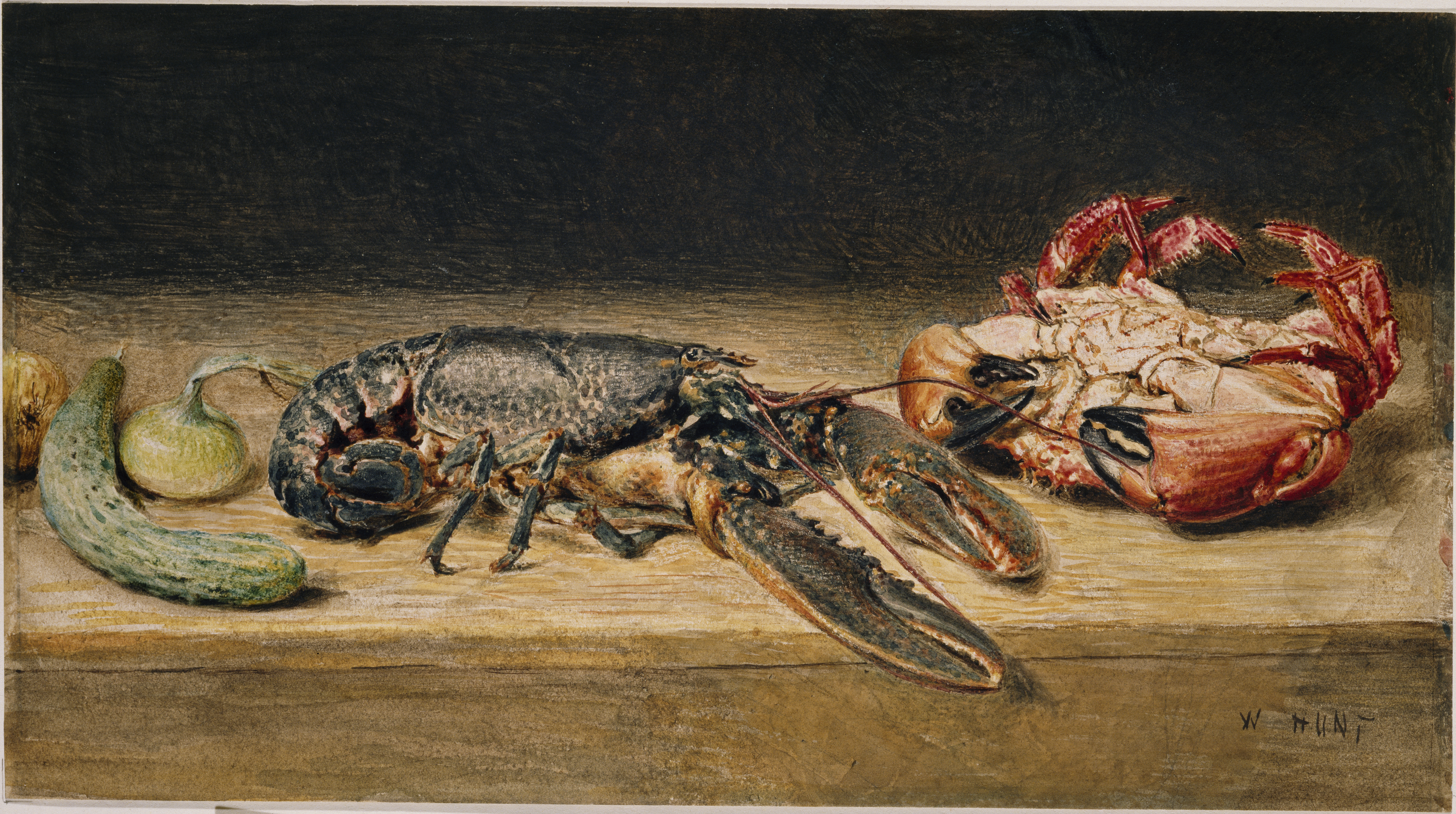
Lobster, Crab, and a Cucumber by William Henry Hunt (watercolour, 1826 or 1827)

Humans have eaten lobster since prehistory, as shown by large piles of lobster shells. It was being consumed as a regular food product in fishing communities along the shores of Britain, the Mediterranean, South Africa, Australia, Peru, and Papua New Guinea during the Stone Age. It was an important secondary food source and source of nutrients for European coastal dwellers, and sometimes a primary food source.

Lobster became a popular mid-range delicacy during the mid to late Roman period. The price of lobster varied, but lobster was regularly transported inland over long distances to meet demand. A mosaic found in the ruins of Pompeii suggests that the spiny lobster was eaten during the early imperial period. It was a popular food among the Moche people of Peru between 50 CE and 800 CE. Lobster shells were also used to create a light pink dye, ornaments, and tools. A mass-produced lobster-shaped effigy vessel dated to this period attests to lobster's popularity at this time, though the purpose of this vessel has not been identified.

The Viking period saw an increase in lobster and other shellfish consumption among northern Europeans. This can be attributed to the overall increase in marine activity due to the development of better boats and the increasing cultural investment in building ships and training sailors. The consumption of marine life went up overall in this period, and the consumption of lobster went up in accordance with this general trend. Unlike fish, however, lobster had to be cooked within two days of leaving salt water, limiting the availability of lobster for inland dwellers. Thus lobster, more than fish, became a food primarily available to the relatively well-off, at least among non-coastal dwellers.

Lobster is first mentioned in cookbooks during the medieval period. Le Viandier de Taillevent, a French recipe collection written around 1300, suggests that lobster (also called saltwater crayfish) be "Cooked in wine and water, or in the oven; eaten in vinegar." Le Viandier de Taillevent is considered to be one of the first "haute cuisine" cookbooks, advising on how to cook meals that would have been quite elaborate for the period and making usage of expensive and hard to obtain ingredients. Though the original edition, which includes the recipe for lobster, was published before the birth of French court cook Guillaume Tirel, Tirel later expanded and republished this recipe collection, suggesting that the recipes included in both editions were popular among the highest circles of French nobility, including King Philip VI. The inclusion of a lobster recipe in this cookbook, especially one which does not make use of other more expensive ingredients, attests to the popularity of lobster among the wealthy.

The French household guidebook Le Ménagier de Paris, published in 1393, includes no less than five recipes including lobster, which vary in elaboration. A guidebook intended to provide advice for women running upper-class households, Le Ménagier de Paris is similar to its predecessor in that it indicates the popularity of lobster as a food among the upper classes.

During the early 1400s, lobster was still a popular dish among the upper classes. During this time, influential households used the variety and variation of species served at feasts to display wealth and prestige. Lobster was commonly found among these spreads, indicating that it continued to be held in high esteem among the wealthy. In one notable instance, the Bishop of Salisbury offered at least 42 kinds of crustaceans and fish at his feasts over nine months, including several varieties of lobster. However, lobster was not a food exclusively accessed by the wealthy. The general population living on the coasts made use of the various food sources provided by the ocean, and shellfish especially became a more popular source of nutrition. Among the general population, lobster was generally eaten boiled during the mid-15th century, but the influence of the cuisine of higher society can be seen in that it was now also regularly eaten cold with vinegar. The inland peasantry would still have generally been unfamiliar with lobster during this time.

Lobster continued to be eaten as a delicacy and a general staple food among coastal communities until the late 17th century. During this time, the influence of the Church and the government regulating and sometimes banning meat consumption during certain periods continued to encourage the popularity of seafood, especially shellfish, as a meat alternative among all classes. Throughout this period, lobster was eaten fresh, pickled, and salted. From the late 17th century onward, developments in fishing, transportation, and cooking technology allowed lobster to more easily make its way inland, and the variety of dishes involving lobster and cooking techniques used with the ingredient expanded. However, these developments coincided with a decrease in the lobster population, and lobster increasingly became a delicacy food, valued among the rich as a status symbol and less likely to be found in the diet of the general population.

The American lobster was not originally popular among European colonists in North America. This was partially due to the European inlander's association of lobster with barely edible salted seafood and partially due to a cultural opinion that seafood was a lesser alternative to meat that did not provide the taste or nutrients desired.

The extreme abundance of lobster contributed to a perception of lobster as a poverty food or as a food for indentured servants or lower members of society in coastal New England and the Canadian Maritimes. Various legends claim that servants' employment agreements or local laws or prison regulations forbade serving lobster more than twice per week, but there is no evidence of that. Another story claims that lobster was spread on fields as fertilizer, but it was lobster shells, which were refuse from lobster canneries, that was used as fertilizer. Lobster was often used as fish bait, and until well into the 20th century, it was not viewed as more than a low-priced canned staple food.

In the mid-19th century, New Yorkers and Bostonians developed a taste for lobster. Commercial lobster fisheries only flourished after the development of the lobster smack, a custom-made boat with open holding tanks on the deck to keep the lobsters alive during transport.

Canned lobster from Nova Scotia

The first US lobster cannery opened in Eastport, Maine in the 1840s. By 1880, Maine had 23; of the total lobster catch of 14.2 million pounds, about 2/3 was canned. Canning shifted to the Canadian Maritime Provinces in the 1870s. The Maritimes were too far from major markets to support a live lobster trade, so most of their catch was canned. In Prince Edward Island in 1879, 35 canneries canned 2.3 million pounds, mostly shipped to Great Britain. In Maine, overfishing led to stricter legal restrictions on lobstering, and shipping live lobsters became more practical using ice, so by 1895, the Maine lobster canning industry had disappeared. In Canada, by 1921, about 6.6m pounds of lobster were canned. Through the 1950s, the number of Canadian canneries declined as refrigerated rail, truck, and air freight made shipping live lobster easier and faster: live lobster could efficiently reach markets throughout North America, especially after airline deregulation in 1977.

=== Grading ===
Caught lobsters are graded as new-shell, hard-shell, or old-shell. Because lobsters that have recently shed their shells are the most delicate, an inverse relationship exists between the price of American lobster and its flavor. New-shell lobsters have paper-thin shells and a worse meat-to-shell ratio, but the meat is very sweet. However, the lobsters are so delicate that even transport to Boston almost kills them, making the market for new-shell lobsters strictly local to the fishing towns where they are offloaded. Hard-shell lobsters with firm shells but less sweet meat can survive shipping to Boston, New York, and even Los Angeles, so they command a higher price than new-shell lobsters. Meanwhile, old-shell lobsters, which have not shed since the previous season and have a coarser flavor, can be shipped by air anywhere in the world and arrive alive, making them the most expensive.

=== Killing methods and animal welfare ===
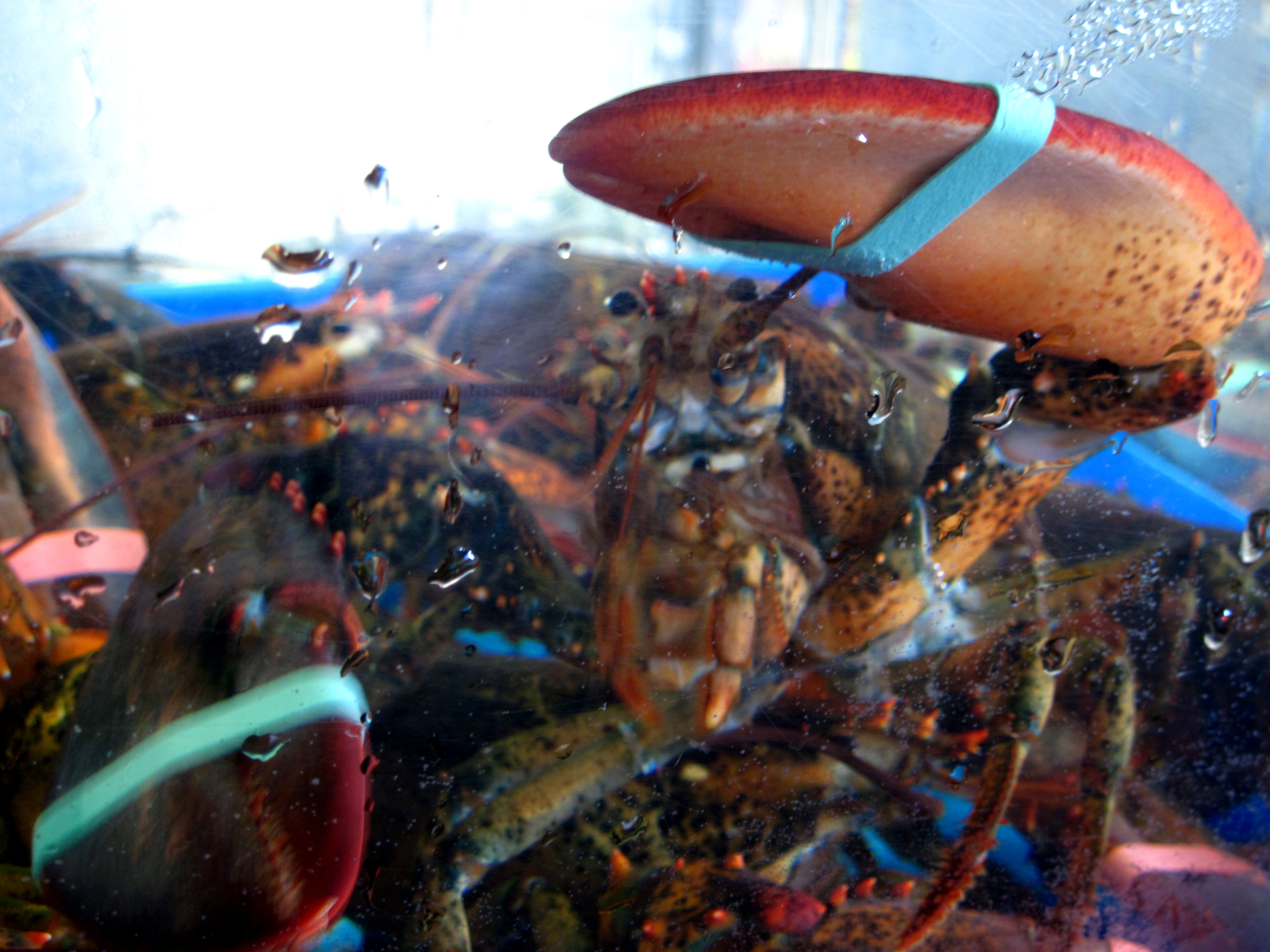
Lobsters in a tank at a fish market

Several methods are used for killing lobsters. The most common way of killing lobsters is by placing them live in boiling water, sometimes after being placed in a freezer for a period. Boiling lobsters has been banned in several jurisdictions, including Switzerland, New Zealand, and parts of Italy. In Italy, offenders face fines of up to €495.

Another method is to split the lobster or sever the body in half lengthwise. To effectively kill the lobster quickly, the whole lobster must be split in two (not just its head, as is the practice in some restaurants). Lobsters may also be killed or immobilized immediately before boiling by a stab into the brain (pithing), in the belief that this will stop suffering. However, a lobster's brain operates from not one but several ganglia, and disabling only the frontal ganglion does not usually result in death. Lobsters can be killed by electrocution prior to cooking. Another method of rendering a lobster unconscious is by chilling, but this method lacks evidence and needs further study.

==== Boiled alive ====
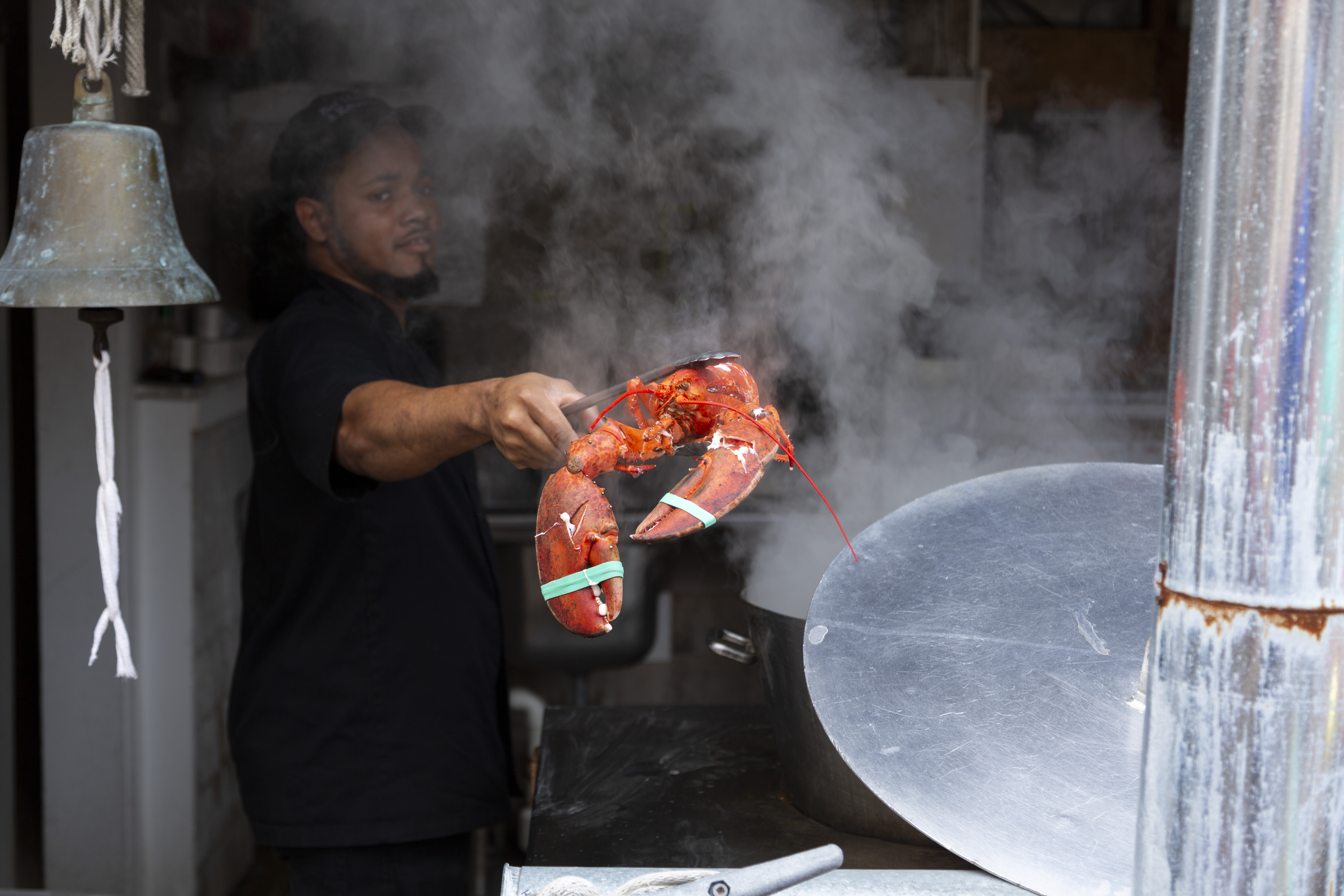
A lobster with its claws bound after being boiled alive

Boiling has been deemed to cause extreme suffering in lobsters, which continue to show intense brain activity for 30 to 150 seconds after immersion in boiling water. Slowly raising the water temperature may also cause pain in crustaceans over a longer period of time.

In 2021, a study conducted by experts from the London School of Economics concluded there was "strong scientific evidence decapod crustaceans and cephalopod molluscs are sentient". As of 2025, boiling lobsters alive remains common practice in the UK, although lawyers have argued that it could be considered illegal under animal welfare legislation. Lobsters in the UK have been legally recognized as sentient beings since the introduction of the Animal Welfare (Sentience) Act 2022.

===== Legal status =====
Norway, Austria, New Zealand and some Australian territories also place restrictions on the inhumane treatment of lobsters. Cities in Germany and Italy also have explicitly banned the practice of boiling lobsters alive.

In 2018, Switzerland was the first country to ban the live boiling of lobsters. In Switzerland lobsters need to be knocked out, or killed instantly, before they are boiled. They also receive other forms of protection while in transit.

== Fishery and aquaculture ==
Lobsters are caught using baited one-way traps with a color-coded marker buoy to mark cages. Lobster is fished in water between 2 and 900 metres (1 and 500 fathoms), although some lobsters live at 3,700 metres (2,000 fathoms). Cages are of plastic-coated galvanized steel or wood. A lobster fisher may tend to as many as 2,000 traps.

In the United States, conservation measures include a federal law prohibiting the purchase, sale, transport, shipment, or possession of any lobster whose carapace length is less than 3 1/4 inches or more than 5 inches, or that are egg-bearing. American lobstermen are required to mark egg-bearing female lobsters with a V-notch, a small, painless slit made to the tail that indicates to future trappers that fertile lobsters must always be thrown back into the sea upon capture.

Around the year 2000, owing to overfishing and high demand, lobster aquaculture expanded.

== Species ==
Examples of Nephropidae

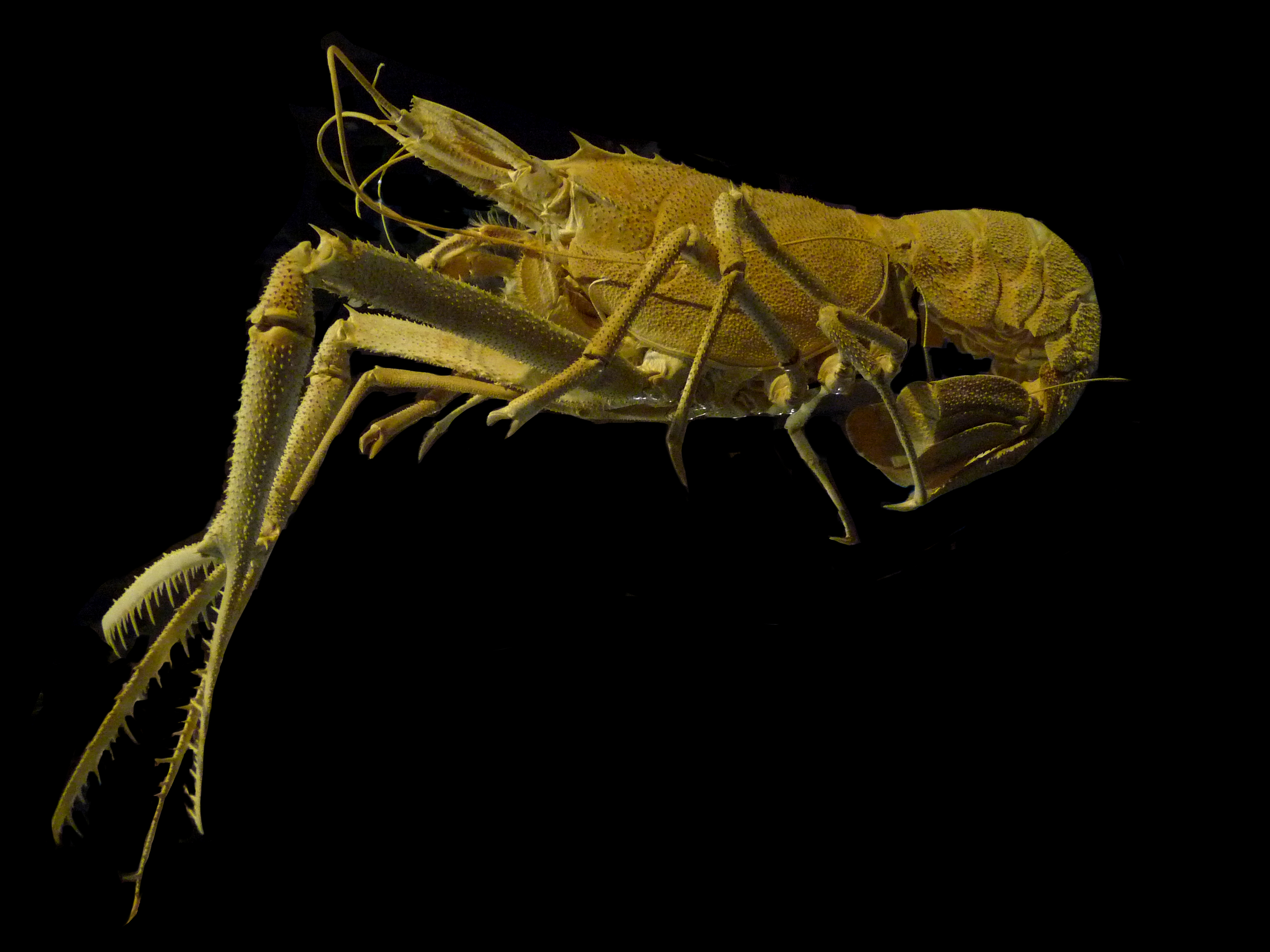
Acanthacaris tenuimana

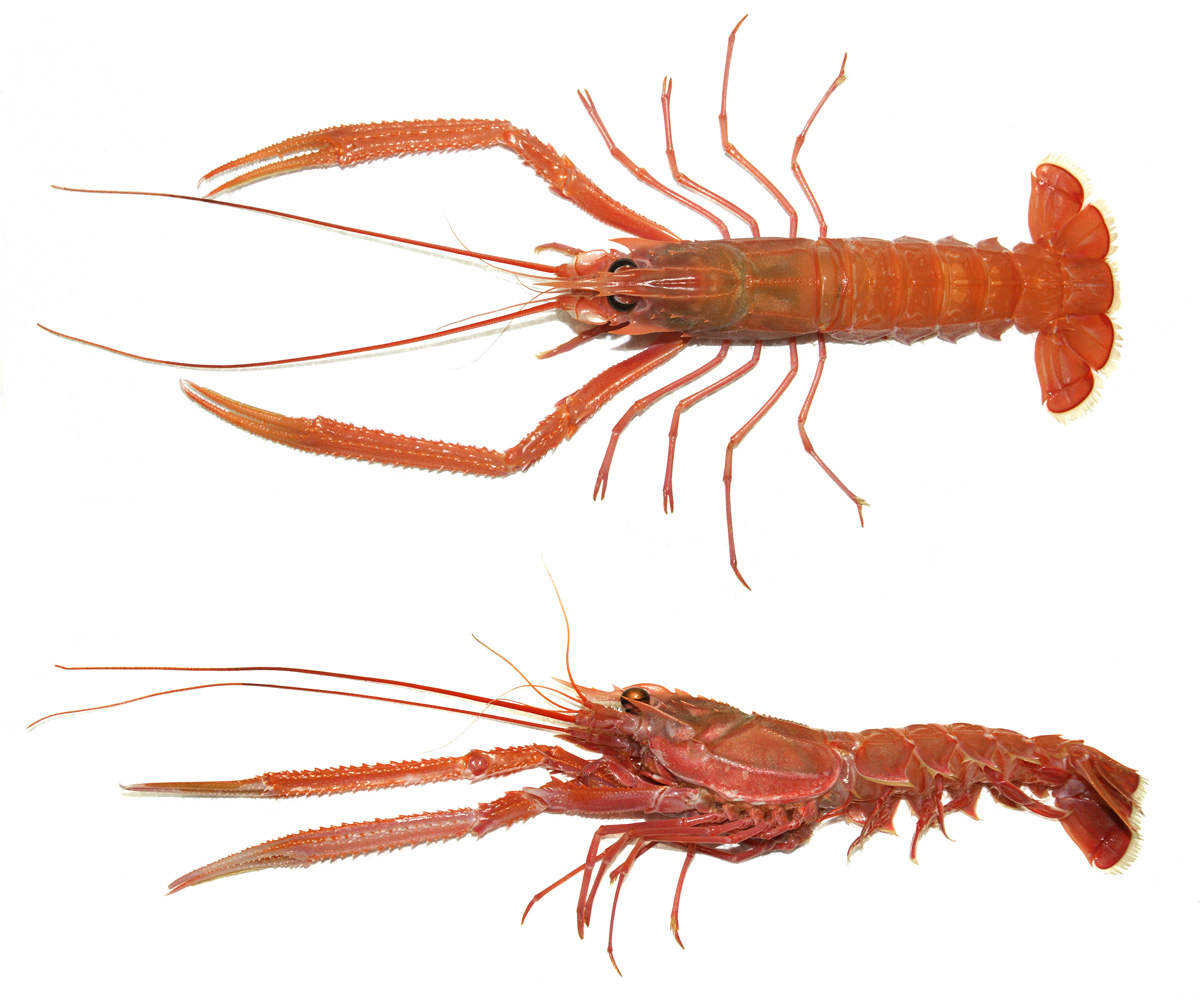
Metanephrops japonicus

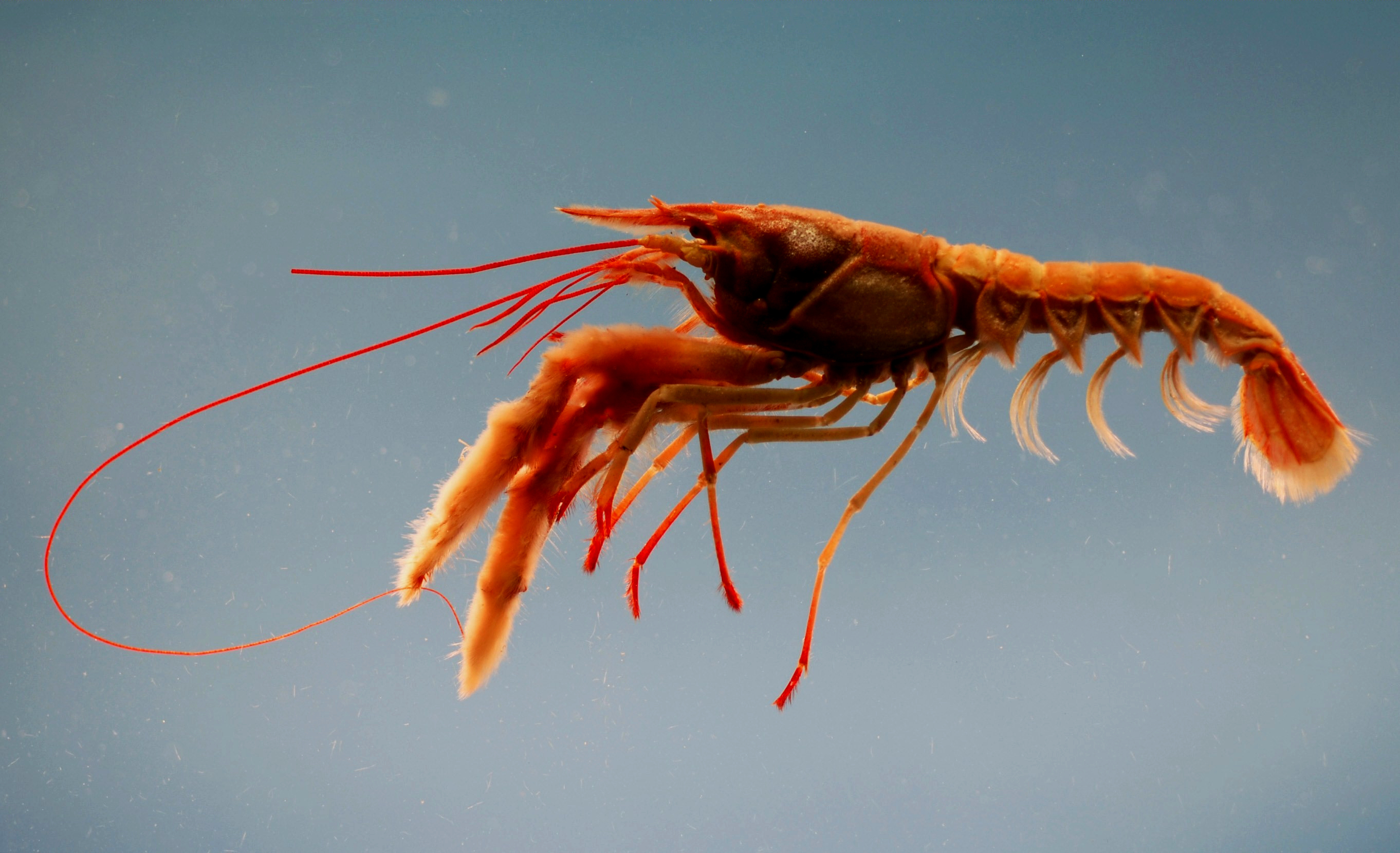
Nephropsis rosea

The fossil record of clawed lobsters extends back at least to the Valanginian age of the Cretaceous (140 million years ago). This list contains all 54 extant species in the family Nephropidae:

- Acanthacaris

- Acanthacaris caeca A. Milne-Edwards, 1881
- Acanthacaris tenuimana Bate, 1888

- Dinochelus Ahyong, Chan & Bouchet, 2010

- Dinochelus ausubeli Ahyong, Chan & Bouchet, 2010

- Eunephrops Smith, 1885

- Eunephrops bairdii Smith, 1885
- Eunephrops cadenasi Chace, 1939
- Eunephrops luckhursti Manning, 1997
- Eunephrops manningi Holthuis, 1974

- Homarinus Kornfield, Williams & Steneck, 1995

- Homarinus capensis (Herbst, 1792) – Cape lobster

- Homarus Weber, 1795

- Homarus americanus H. Milne-Edwards, 1837 – American lobster
- Homarus gammarus (Linnaeus, 1758) – European lobster

- Metanephrops Jenkins, 1972

- Metanephrops andamanicus (Wood-Mason, 1892) – Andaman lobster
- Metanephrops arafurensis (De Man, 1905)
- Metanephrops armatus Chan & Yu, 1991
- Metanephrops australiensis (Bruce, 1966) – Australian scampi
- Metanephrops binghami (Boone, 1927) – Caribbean lobster
- Metanephrops boschmai (Holthuis, 1964) – Bight lobster
- Metanephrops challengeri (Balss, 1914) – New Zealand scampi
- Metanephrops formosanus Chan & Yu, 1987
- Metanephrops japonicus (Tapparone-Canefri, 1873) – Japanese lobster
- Metanephrops mozambicus Macpherson, 1990
- Metanephrops neptunus (Bruce, 1965)
- Metanephrops rubellus (Moreira, 1903)
- Metanephrops sagamiensis (Parisi, 1917)
- Metanephrops sibogae (De Man, 1916)
- Metanephrops sinensis (Bruce, 1966) – China lobster
- Metanephrops taiwanicus (Hu, 1983)
- Metanephrops thomsoni (Bate, 1888)
- Metanephrops velutinus Chan & Yu, 1991

- Nephropides Manning, 1969

- Nephropides caribaeus Manning, 1969

- Nephrops Leach, 1814

- Nephrops norvegicus (Linnaeus, 1758) – Norway lobster, Dublin Bay prawn, langoustine

- Nephropsis Wood-Mason, 1872

- Nephropsis acanthura Macpherson, 1990
- Nephropsis aculeata Smith, 1881 – Florida lobsterette
- Nephropsis agassizii A. Milne-Edwards, 1880
- Nephropsis atlantica Norman, 1882
- Nephropsis carpenteri Wood-Mason, 1885
- Nephropsis ensirostris Alcock, 1901
- Nephropsis holthuisii Macpherson, 1993
- Nephropsis malhaensis Borradaile, 1910
- Nephropsis neglecta Holthuis, 1974
- Nephropsis occidentalis Faxon, 1893
- Nephropsis rosea Bate, 1888
- Nephropsis serrata Macpherson, 1993
- Nephropsis stewarti Wood-Mason, 1872
- Nephropsis suhmi Bate, 1888
- Nephropsis sulcata Macpherson, 1990

- Thaumastocheles Wood-Mason, 1874

- Thaumastocheles dochmiodon Chan & Saint Laurent, 1999
- Thaumastocheles japonicus Calman, 1913
- Thaumastocheles zaleucus (Thomson, 1873)

- Thaumastochelopsis Bruce, 1988

- Thaumastochelopsis brucei Ahyong, Chu & Chan, 2007
- Thaumastochelopsis wardi Bruce, 1988

- Thymopides Burukovsky & Averin, 1977

- Thymopides grobovi (Burukovsky & Averin, 1976)
- Thymopides laurentae Segonzac & Macpherson, 2003

- Thymops Holthuis, 1974

- Thymops birsteini (Zarenkov & Semenov, 1972)

- Thymopsis Holthuis, 1974

- Thymopsis nilenta Holthuis, 1974

== See also ==
- Gérard de Nerval, a French writer who kept a lobster as a pet
- Lobster War, an early-1960s diplomatic conflict between Brazil and France over spiny lobster fishing territories
- Lobstering, an innate escape mechanism in marine and freshwater crustaceans
- Lobster emoji, a character in Unicode depicting a lobster
- Crawfish
