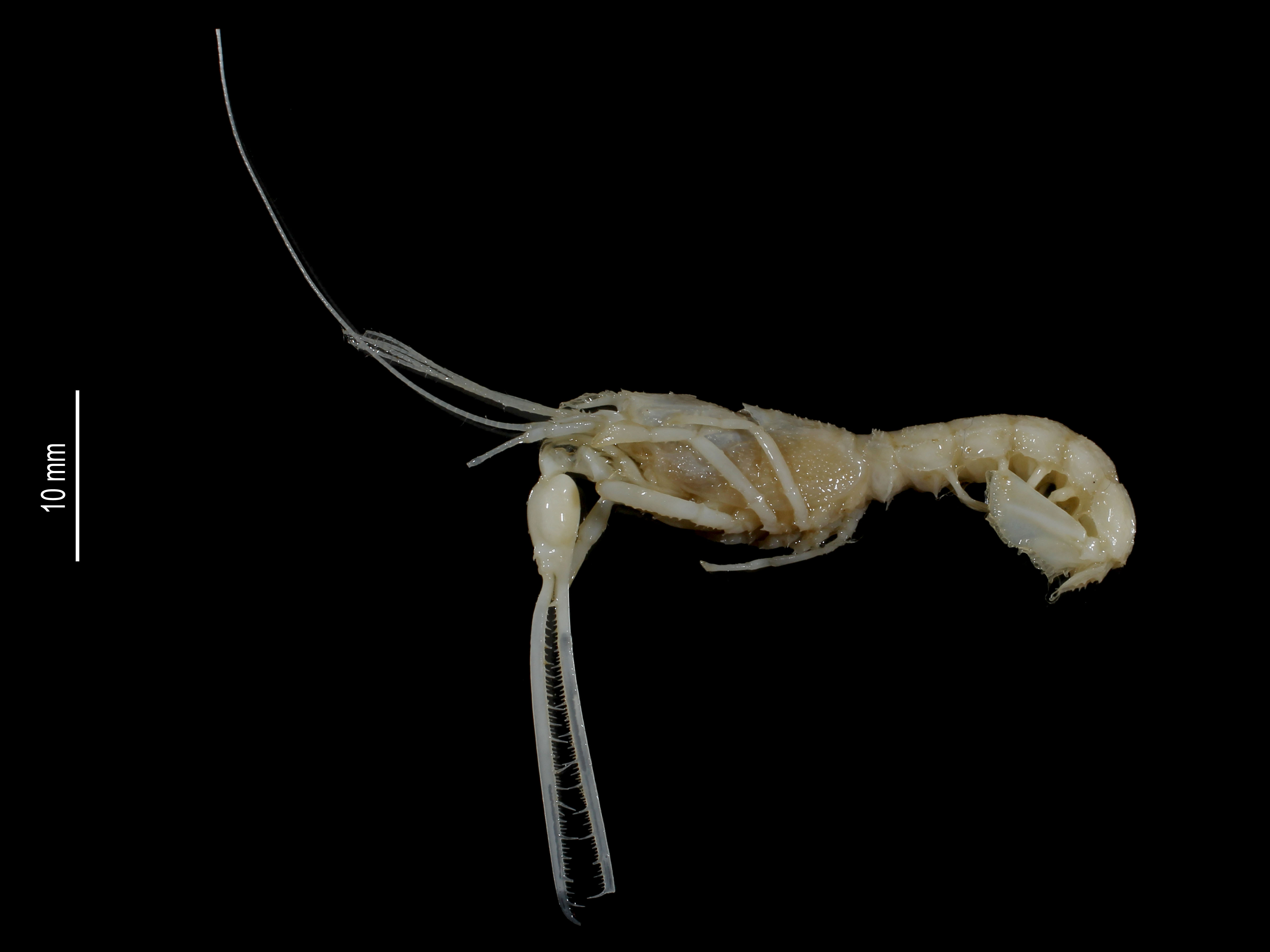
- Thaumastocheles massonktenos

Scientific classification
- Kingdom: Animalia
- Phylum: Arthropoda
- Class: Malacostraca
- Order: Decapoda
- Suborder: Pleocyemata
- Superfamily: Nephropoidea
- Family: Thaumastochelidae; Bate, 1888

Genera
- Thaumastocheles Wood-Mason, 1874; Thaumastochelopsis Bruce, 1988

= Thaumastochelidae =

Family of lobsters

The family Thaumastochelidae contains five known species of deep-sea lobsters, three in the genus Thaumastocheles, and two in the genus Thaumastochelopsis. The fifth species was discovered in the ten–year Census of Marine Life. These creatures are distinguished from other clawed lobsters by their blindness (an adaptation to deep-sea life), and by their single elongated, spiny chela.

The family Thaumastochelidae is now more usually subsumed into the lobster family Nephropidae.

== Species ==
The five species are as follows:

- Thaumastocheles
  - Thaumastocheles dochmiodon Chan & de Saint Laurent, 1999 is found in the Timor Sea.
  - Thaumastocheles japonicus Calman, 1913, the "Pacific pincer lobster", is endemic to the Sea of Japan.

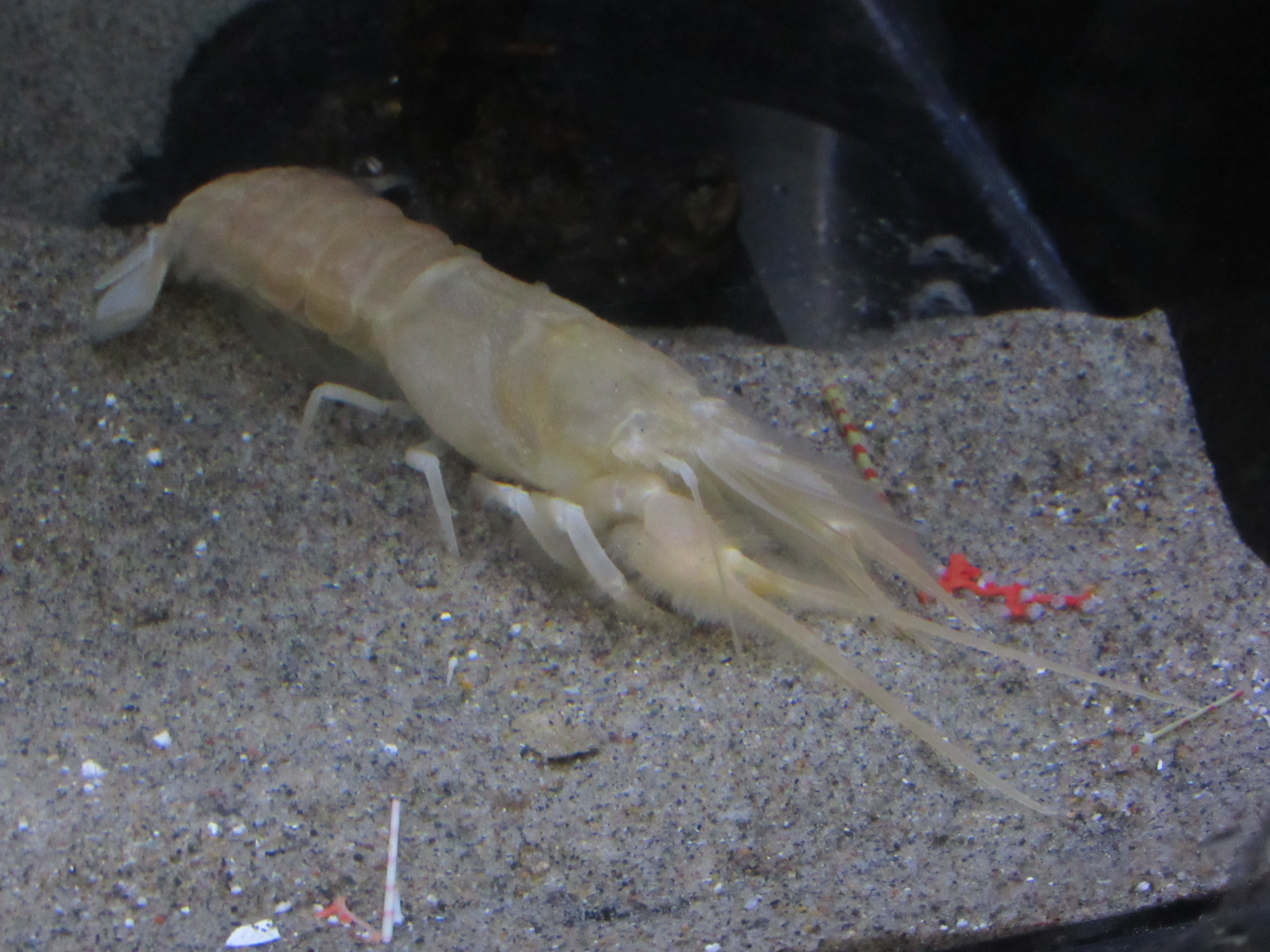
T. japonicus

  - Thaumastocheles zaleucus Thomson, 1873, the "Atlantic pincer lobster" or "Atlantic deep-sea lobster", is endemic to the Caribbean region.

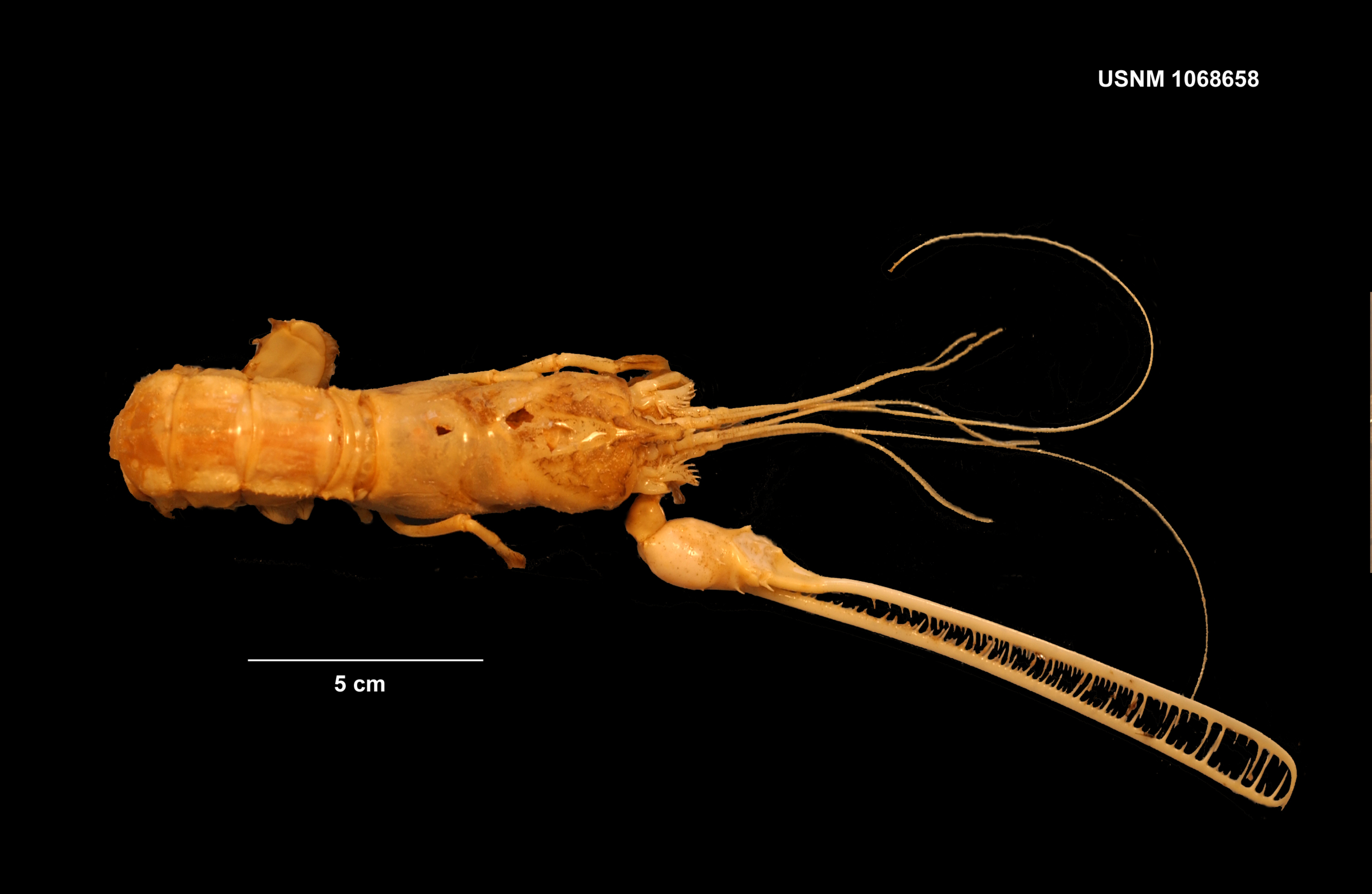
Specimen of T. zaleucus

- Thaumastochelopsis
  - Thaumastochelopsis brucei Ahyong, Chu & Chan, 2007 lives in the Coral Sea.
  - Thaumastochelopsis wardi Bruce, 1988, the "Australian pincer lobster", lives in the Coral Sea.
