= Thymops =

Thymops birsteini

Conservation status
- Least Concern (IUCN 3.1)

Scientific classification
- Kingdom: Animalia
- Phylum: Arthropoda
- Clade: Pancrustacea
- Class: Malacostraca
- Order: Decapoda
- Suborder: Pleocyemata
- Family: Nephropidae
- Genus: Thymops; Holthuis, 1974
- Species: T. birsteini

Binomial name
- Thymops birsteini (Zarenkov & Semenov, 1972)

Synonyms
- Nephropides birsteini Zarenkov & Semenov, 1972

Species of lobster

Thymops birsteini, the Patagonian lobsterette, is a species of lobster found around the coasts of South America, particularly the South Atlantic. It belongs to the monotypic genus Thymops.

== Distribution ==
T. birsteini is found on the continental shelf around South America, particularly in the Argentine Sea. In the Atlantic Ocean, it is found south of 37° south, with Uruguay representing the northern extremity of its distribution; on the Chilean (Pacific) side, it is found south of 51° south. Its range includes the areas around the Falkland Islands (Islas Malvinas) and areas near South Georgia, extending as far south as 57°, close to the Antarctic Peninsula. It lives at depths of 120–1,500 metres (390–4,920 ft).

== Description ==
T. birsteini resembles a typical lobster, with two large claws, four other pairs of pereiopods, and a long pleon (tail). The carapace is granular, especially in the front half, and it bears a rostrum which divides into two points at its tip. The total length may range from 8 to 25 centimetres (3.1 to 9.8 in), with the carapace being 2–10 cm (0.79–3.94 in) long. Smaller individuals are found in shallower waters, and larger individuals are found at greater depths (up to 1,400 m or 4,600 ft). There is also latitudinal variation in colour, with northern individuals being pale yellow, while those from further south are maroon.

== Ecology ==
Little is known about the biological interactions of T. birsteini. It is occasionally eaten by the Patagonian toothfish Dissostichus eleginoides. It seems to prefer muddy bottoms, and has been observed entering and exiting burrows.

== Life cycle ==
As in other pleocyemates, T. birsteini broods its eggs on the female's pleopods. One female may carry up to 380 eggs, each 1.5–1.9 millimetres (0.059–0.075 in) in diameter. The eggs grow as they develop to a size of 2.9–3.3 mm (0.11–0.13 in). Newly hatched larvae have a carapace length of 1.7–2.2 mm (0.067–0.087 in), and are present in smaller numbers than the eggs, with a maximum of 43 observed on a single female. This extended larval release has previously been found in other sub-Antarctic decapods, and is an adaptation to the low temperature, the long time taken for brooding, and the low overall fecundity.

== Edibility ==
The meat of T. birsteini is reported to be excellent, and it is thought that the species could be commercially exploited if sufficient concentrations could be discovered. The average weight of a caught individual is about 150 grams (5.3 oz), of which 30% (45 g or 1.6 oz) is the meaty tail. Daily yields of 19 kilograms (42 lb) are typical.
