= Jasus caveorum =

Conservation status
- Data Deficient (IUCN 3.1)

Scientific classification
- Kingdom: Animalia
- Phylum: Arthropoda
- Class: Malacostraca
- Order: Decapoda
- Suborder: Pleocyemata
- Family: Palinuridae
- Genus: Jasus
- Species: J. caveorum

Binomial name
- Jasus caveorum Webber & Booth, 1995

Species of crustacean

Jasus caveorum is a species of spiny lobster found on a single seamount in the southeastern Pacific Ocean, discovered in 1995 by fishermen from New Zealand. It is most similar to Jasus frontalis from the nearby Juan Fernández Islands, but is more closely related to species from the Atlantic and Indian Oceans.

== Distribution ==
Location of the Foundation Seamounts in the Pacific Ocean

Jasus caveorum is known from a single seamount in the Foundation Seamounts chain, around 35°S 120°W, approximately 2,100 kilometres (1,300 mi) south-east of Pitcairn Island, and 4,500 km (2,800 mi) west of the Juan Fernández Islands, Chile. The seamount has two peaks at a depth of 140 metres (460 ft), separated by a col at a depth of 320 m (1,050 ft). J. caveorum is the only species in the genus whose range is not associated with any land that rises above sea level.

J. caveorum was discovered in 1995 by the New Zealand fishing vessel FV David Baker, owned by Southern Seafoods. Commercial lobster traps were laid at various depths, down to 300 m (980 ft); specimens of J. caveorum were recovered from depths down to 180 m (590 ft), but mostly less than 150 m (490 ft).

== Ecology and conservation ==
The ecology of Jasus caveorum is poorly known. Its diet is assumed to be made up chiefly of invertebrates. Most adult individuals are infested with a small stalked barnacle of unknown identity; the same barnacle infests crabs of the genus Chaceon in the same locality.

Since it occurs in international waters, there are no restrictions on fishing J. caveorum. It is occasionally caught by fishermen from New Zealand, and may have been fished more intensively in the 1960s. The state of the stock is unknown, and the species is listed as Data Deficient on the IUCN Red List.

== Description ==
The specimens of Jasus caveorum examined for the species description varied in carapace length from 104 to 129 millimetres (4.1 to 5.1 in). Morphologically, J. caveorum is most similar to J. frontalis, which lives around the Juan Fernández and Desventuradas Islands. It is, however, more closely related to J. tristani and J. paulensis from Tristan da Cunha and the islands of the southern Indian Ocean, respectively. The two species differ in that J. frontalis has sculpturing on the second to sixth abdominal tergae, which is missing in J. caveorum, and in the presence of a row of setae and small spines on the second pereiopod of J. caveorum, but not on that of J. frontalis.

== Taxonomy ==
Jasus caveorum was described in 1995 by W. R. Webber of the Museum of New Zealand Te Papa Tongarewa, and J. D. Booth of the National Institute of Water and Atmospheric Research. The specific epithet caveorum commemorates Joe Cave, Helen Cave and Ernie Cave; it is also a play on the word "cave", since the species occurs in a hidden area, with no above-ground presence.
