= Lobster fishing =

Aspect of the fishing industry

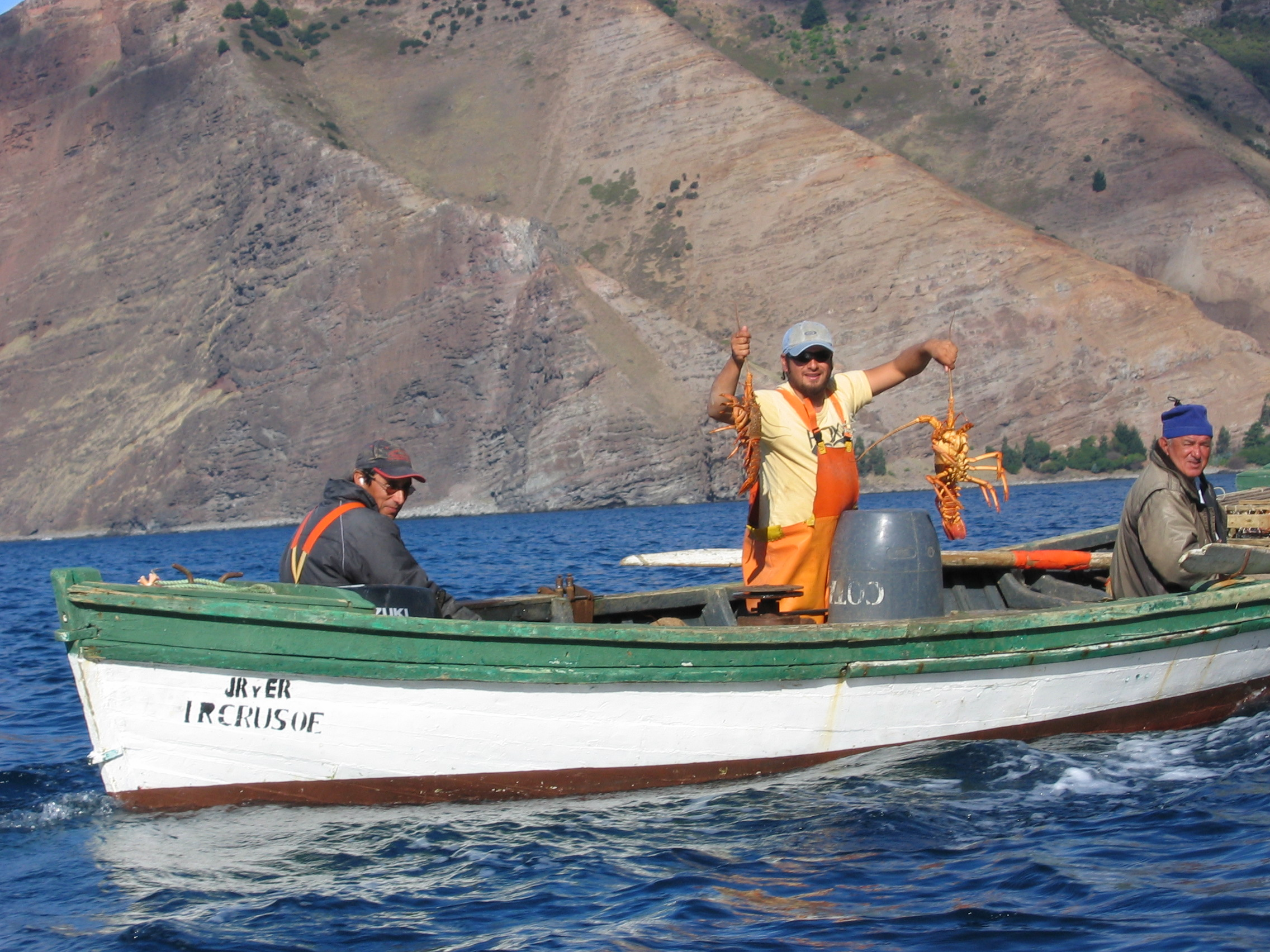
Fishermen with their catch of the spiny lobster Jasus frontalis in the Juan Fernández Islands, Chile

Lobsters (Note: For the purposes of fisheries, the term "lobster" includes clawed lobsters (Nephropidae), spiny lobsters (Palinuridae), slipper lobsters (Scyllaridae), and several other groups of large long-bodied decapod crustaceans.) are widely fished around the world for their meat. They are often hard to catch in large numbers, but their large size can make them a profitable catch. Although the majority of the targeted species are tropical, the majority of the global catch is in temperate waters.

Methods of fishing include handfishing and spearfishing or using lobster traps (pots), trawling, gill nets and trammel nets.

Legal restrictions apply to the catching of lobsters in many parts of the world, combat overfishing and allow recruitment to the next generation. Common restrictions include the provision of a minimum landing size, preventing fishermen from catching berried lobsters (females carrying eggs), closed seasons and limiting catches with individual fishing quotas.

== Methods ==
Several methods are used to catch lobsters, with the method depending largely on the species being targeted.

=== Lobster pots ===
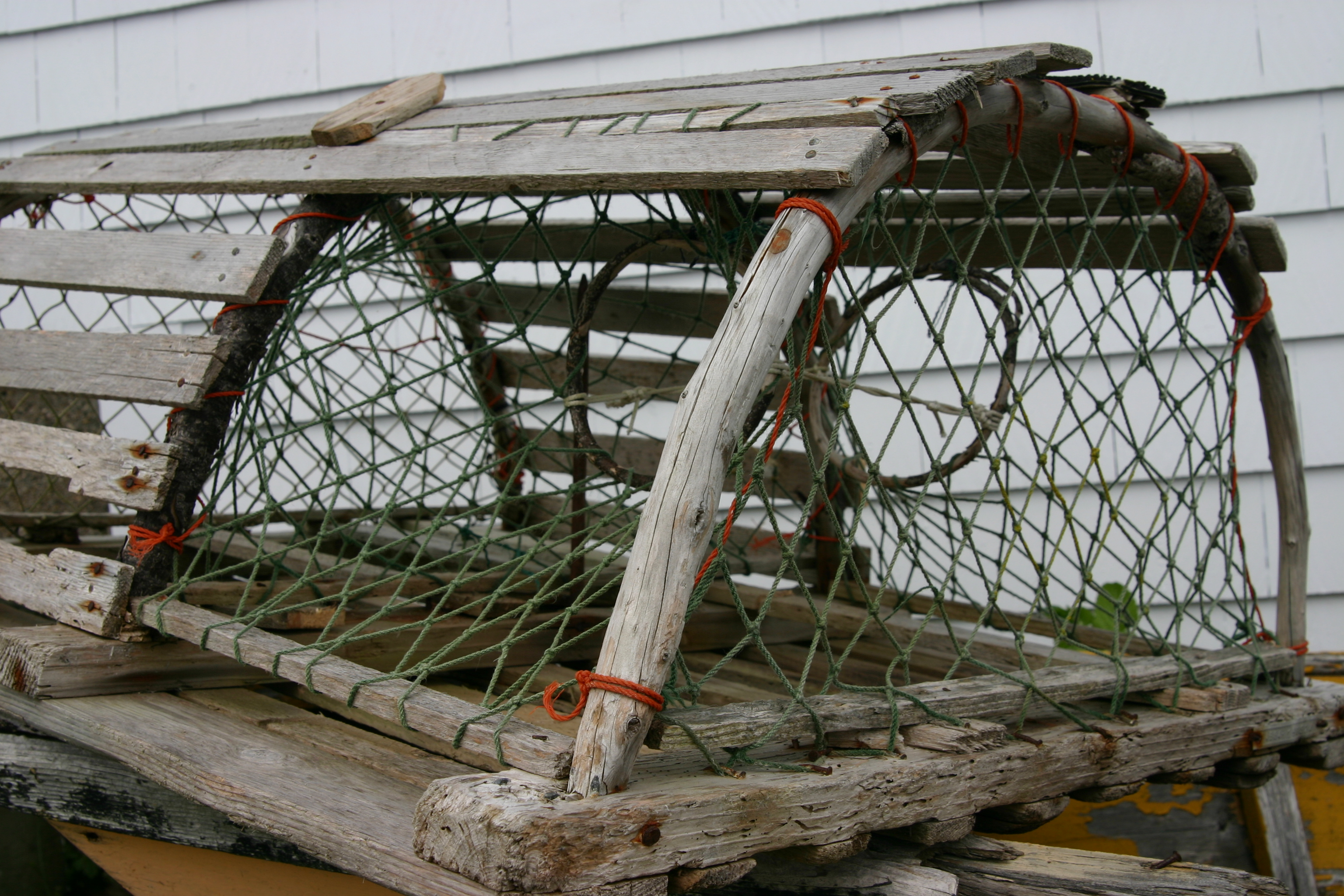
A lobster pot

The large Homarus lobsters are caught almost exclusively with lobster pots (also called "lobster traps"). These are large rigid objects which the lobster enters voluntarily, often to reach bait, and which it then cannot escape. Traps are also used in some spiny lobster fisheries, such as the fishery for the California spiny lobster, Panulirus interruptus, in the eastern Pacific Ocean.

Lobster traps can either be wire or wooden. Today, fishermen are straying from the wooden traps as they can be heavier than the wire. Traditionally, a lobster trap has two compartments. The outside, or “kitchen”, has nylon netting leading inside the trap to the “parlour” where the lobsters are caught.

=== Trawling ===
Trawling is the main method used for the Norway lobster or Dublin Bay prawn, Nephrops norvegicus, and for those slipper lobsters that prefer soft substrates, such as Thenus and Ibacus. It has also become more frequently used in the fishery for Homarus americanus.

=== Gill nets and trammel nets ===
Gill nets and trammel nets are used for the Caribbean spiny lobster, Panulirus argus.

=== Hand-fishing and spearfishing ===
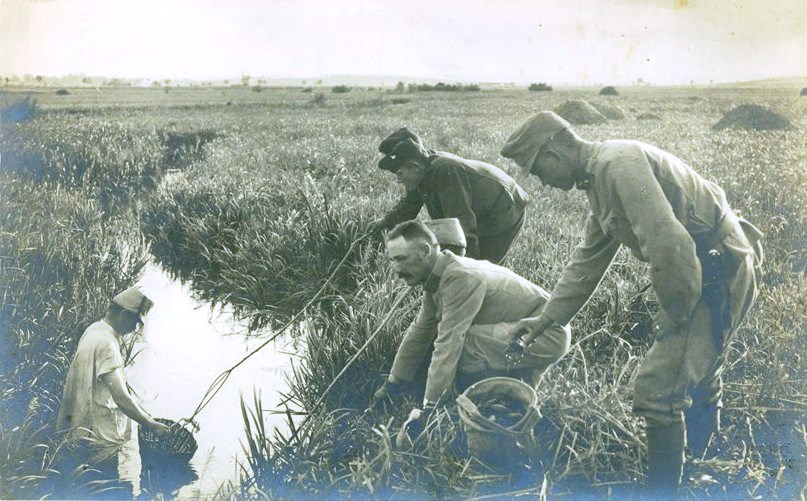
Austro-Hungarian soldiers catching crayfish, WWI

Slipper lobsters that prefer crevices, caves and reefs (including Scyllarides, Arctides and Parribacus species) are usually caught by SCUBA divers.

== Restrictions ==
Legal restrictions apply to the catching of lobsters in many parts of the world, in order to prevent overfishing and allow recruitment to the next generation. Common restrictions include the provision of a minimum landing size, preventing fishermen from catching "berried" females (females carrying eggs), closed seasons and limiting catches with individual fishing quotas.

Commercial fishing regulators in the United States, such as the Atlantic States Marine Fisheries Commission and the National Marine Fisheries Service, enforce restrictions through the use of lobster fishing licenses and lobster pot tags that correspond to the fisher's permit number. Tag manufacturers also maintain databases for each state's licensed fisheries, tracking how many tags each fisher purchases every year.

== Distribution and species ==
Principal commercial lobster species

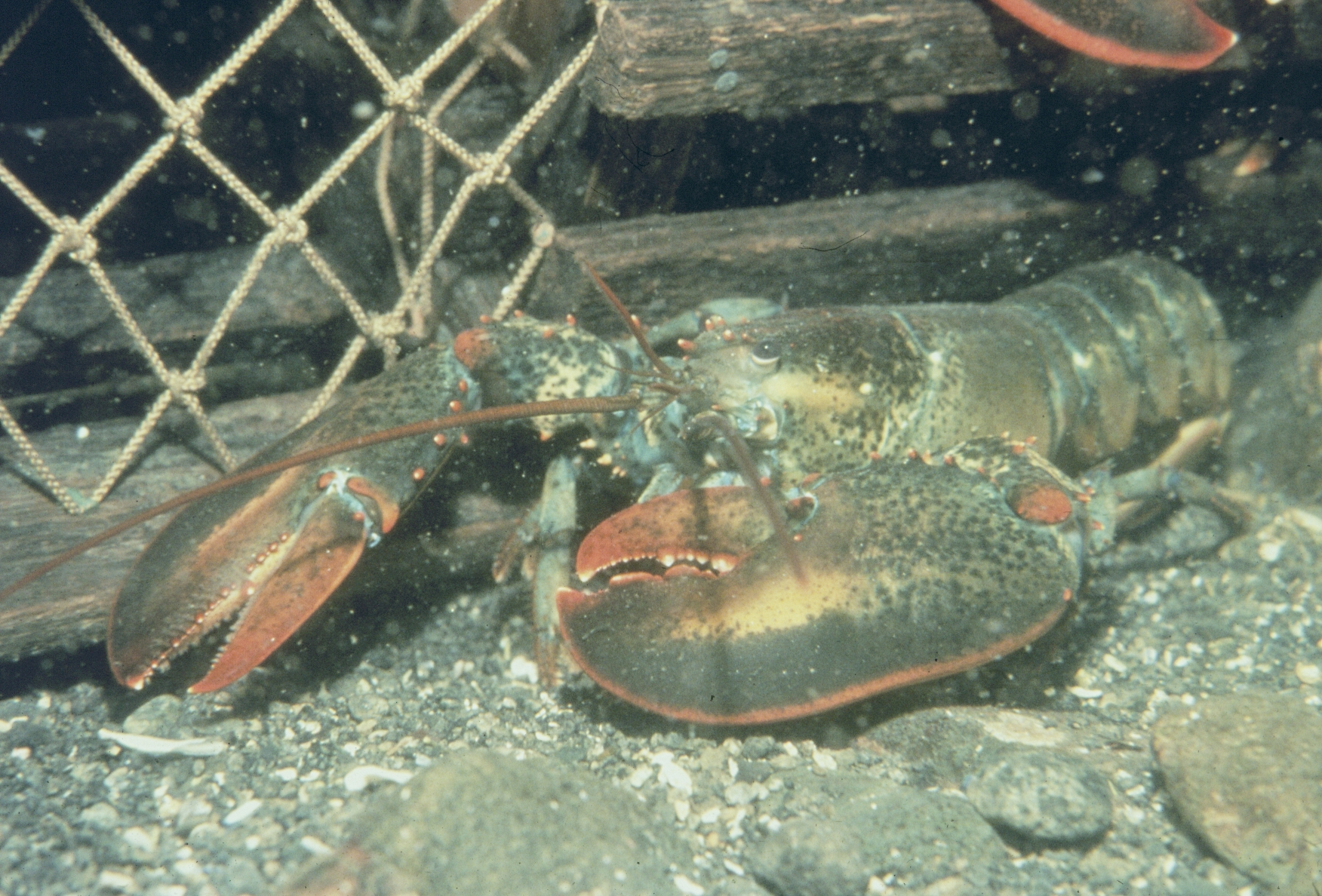
Homarus americanus (American or Maine lobster)

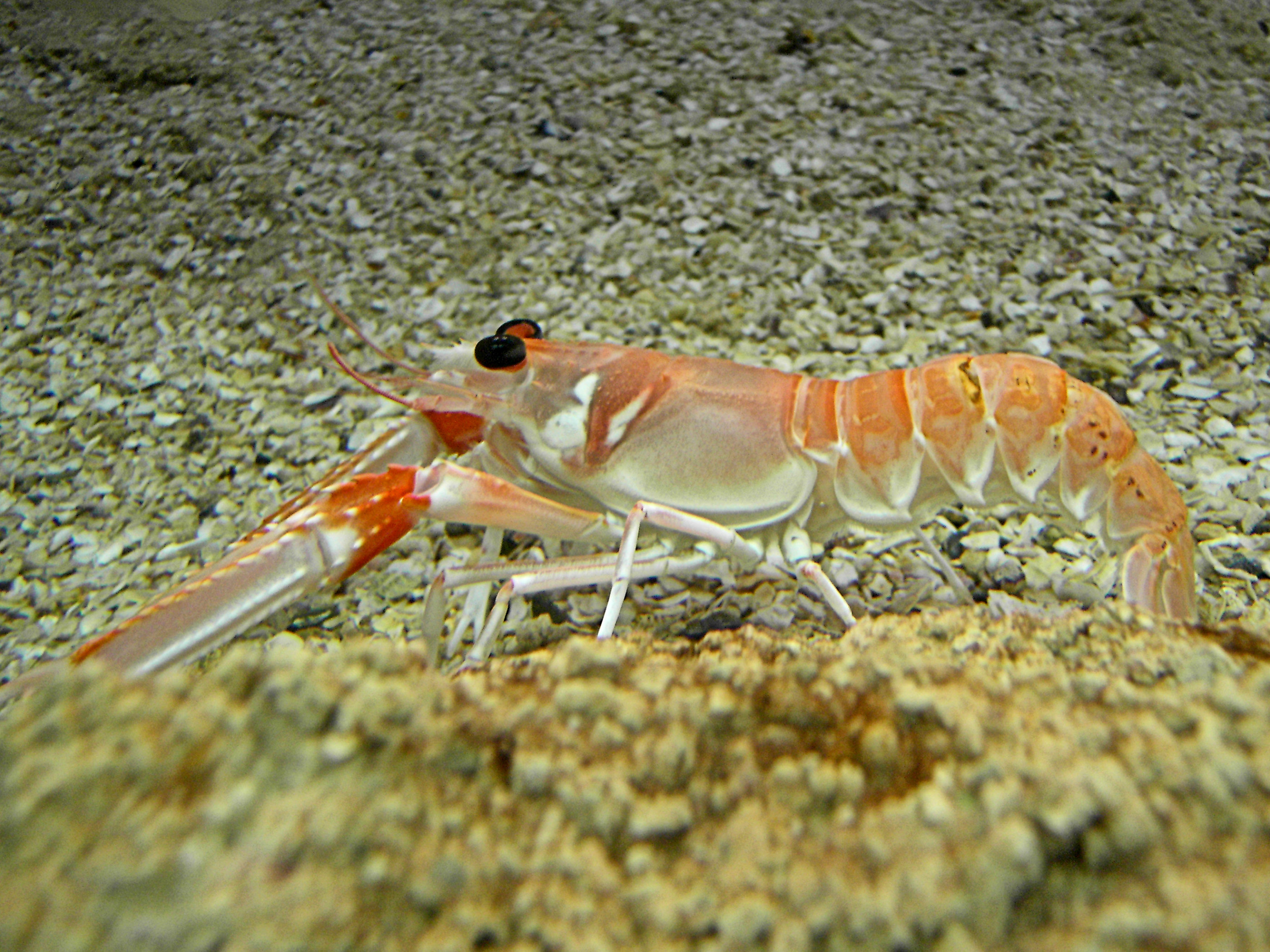
Nephrops norvegicus (Norway lobster, Dublin Bay prawn, langoustine or scampi)

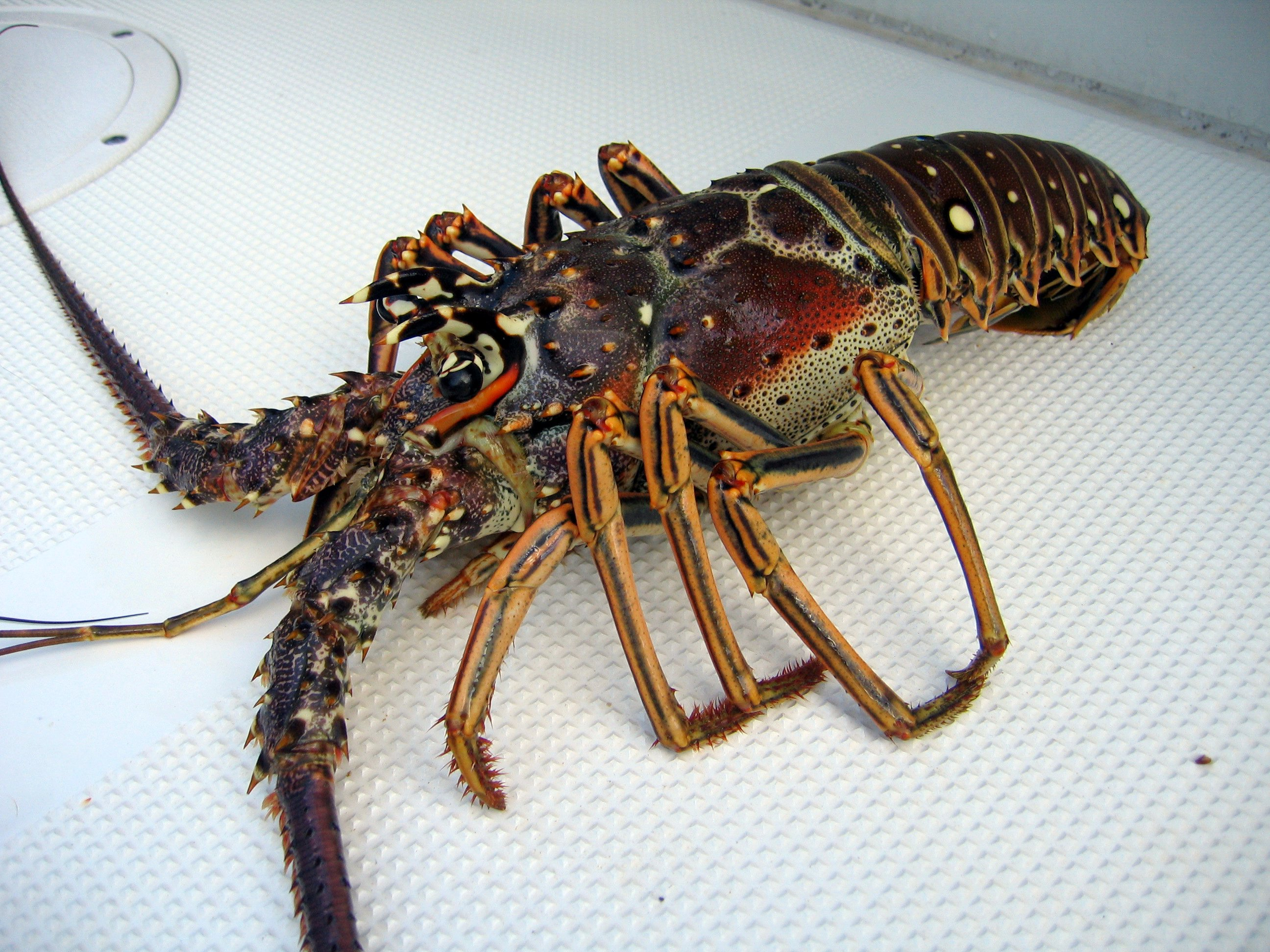
Panulirus argus (Caribbean spiny lobster)

Of the 280,000 tons of lobster catches reported to the Food and Agriculture Organization for the year 2010, 188,000 t (67%) was of true lobsters (family Nephropidae), 80,000 t (28%) was of spiny lobsters (Palinuridae) and about 10,000 t (4%) was of slipper lobsters (Scyllaridae).

FAO common name	Scientific name	Catch in 2010 (t)
American lobster	Homarus americanus	115,651
Norway lobster	Nephrops norvegicus	66,544
Caribbean spiny lobster	Panulirus argus	35,642
Tropical spiny lobsters nei (Note: "Nei" = not elsewhere included.)	Panulirus	22,128
Japanese fan lobster	Ibacus ciliatus	9,114
Australian spiny lobster	Panulirus cygnus	5,502
European lobster	Homarus gammarus	5,083
Southern rock lobster	Jasus novaehollandiae	4,368
Cape rock lobster	Jasus lalandii	3,418
Red rock lobster	Jasus edwardsii	2,871
Lobsters nei	Reptantia	2,577
Longlegged spiny lobster	Panulirus longipes	2,303
Palinurid spiny lobsters nei	Palinurus	1,132
Flathead lobster	Thenus orientalis	924
New Zealand lobster	Metanephrops challengeri	825
Southern spiny lobster	Palinurus gilchristi	734
Common spiny lobster	Palinurus elephas	449
Tristan da Cunha rock lobster	Jasus tristani	403
St. Paul rock lobster	Jasus paulensis	390
Spiny lobsters nei	Palinuridae	306

=== Atlantic Ocean ===
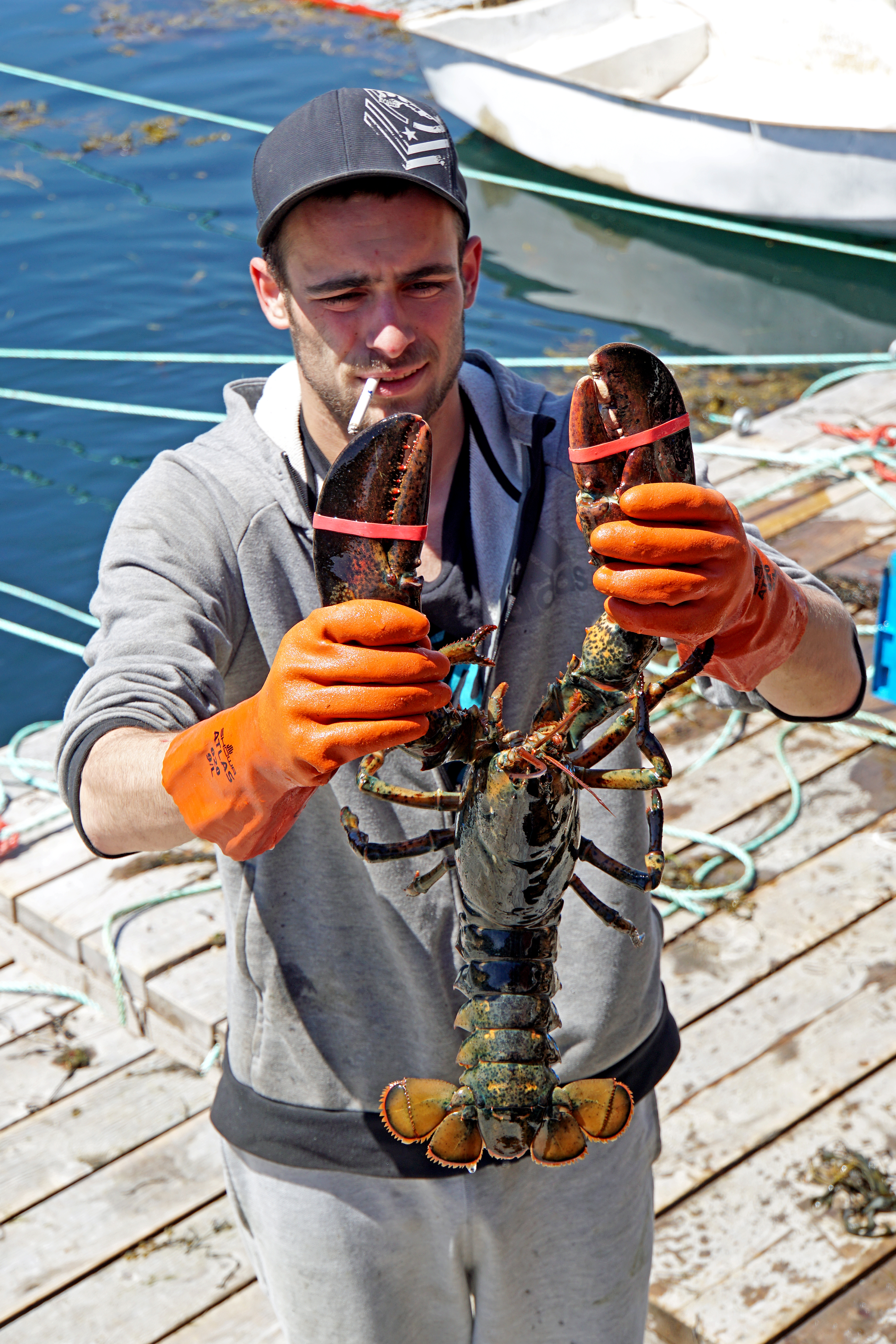
Nova Scotia man with a big one in New Harbour

About 122,000 t of lobsters are caught in the north Atlantic Ocean (FAO Fishing Areas 21 and 27), where the dominant species are Homarus americanus and Nephrops norvegicus.

The State of Maine accounts for 57,000 t of Homarus americanus landings valued at $450 million.

N. norvegicus is mostly caught by trawling. Around 60,000 tonnes are caught annually, half of it in the United Kingdom's waters. Discards from Nephrops fishery may account for up to 37% of the energy requirements of certain marine scavengers, such as the hagfish Myxine glutinosa. Boats involved in Nephrops fishery also catch a number of fish species such as plaice and sole, and it is thought that without that revenue, Nephrops fishery would be economically unviable.

The European lobster, Homarus gammarus is found across the north-eastern Atlantic Ocean from northern Norway to the Azores and Morocco. Homarus gammarus is mostly fished using lobster pots, although lines baited with octopus or cuttlefish sometimes succeed in tempting them out, to allow them to be caught in a net or by hand. In 2008, 4,386 t of H. gammarus were caught across Europe and North Africa, of which 3,462 t (79%) was caught in the British Isles (including the Channel Islands). The minimum landing size for H. gammarus is a carapace length of 87 mm (3.4 in).

=== Caribbean Sea ===
In the Caribbean Sea, the main species targeted by lobster fisheries is the Caribbean spiny lobster, Panulirus argus.

=== Eastern Pacific Ocean ===
The most important lobster species on the West Coast of the United States is the California spiny lobster, Panulirus interruptus. Recreational lobster fishers in California must abide by a legal catch limit of seven lobsters per day and a minimum body length of 3.25 inches (83 mm), measured from the eye socket to the edge of the carapace. The sport season for California spiny lobster starts on the Saturday preceding the first Wednesday in October through to the first Wednesday after 15 March. Commercial fishers use lobster traps.

=== New Zealand ===
New Zealand implements the Quota Management System (QMS) to limit catches of fish and shellfish. Under QMS, a limit of 2,807,364 kilograms (6,189,178 lb) for the rock lobster Jasus edwardsii, and 1,291,000 kg (2,846,000 lb) for the New Zealand scampi, Metanephrops challengeri, were in place in 2011. Recreational fishers may only gather by hand or use lobster pots, while commercial fishers catch lobsters by trawling. The total catch in 2011 was 2,539,946 kg (5,599,622 lb) of J. edwardsii, 350,194 kg (772,046 lb) of M. challengeri, and 23,086 kg (50,896 lb) of Sagmariasus verreauxi.

Recreational fishing of lobsters ("crayfishing") in New Zealand does not require a permit provided catch limits, size restrictions, and seasonal and local restrictions set by the Ministry for Primary Industries (MPI) are followed. The legal recreational daily limit is six lobsters per person, with a maximum of three lobster pots permitted per person. Lobsters cannot be taken if they are in berry (carrying eggs) or in the soft shell stage. For J. edwardsii, the minimum legal size is 54 mm for males (no pincers on the rear legs and single pleopods) and 60 mm for females (pincers on the rear legs and paired pleopods), measuring the width of the tail over the primary splines on the second segment.

=== Australia ===
A number of species are targeted around the coasts of Australia. Jasus edwardsii is found off Australia's southern coast, from Western Australia to New South Wales, as well as in New Zealand. Thenus orientalis, known as the Moreton Bay bug, is fished on the country's north coast.

== Safety ==
Lobster fishing is considered a hazardous occupation by NIOSH. Lobster fishermen who become entangled in their trap line are at risk of drowning if they are pulled overboard. Best practices have been developed to prevent and reduce entanglement, and to facilitate getting fishermen who have fallen overboard back onto their vessels.

Fishing safety can be found in many manuals and courses can be taken to ensure that your vessel and crew are up to date on all of their safety procedures to reduce the risk of injury or drowning. There are many policies to be followed for many things such as on-board working procedure, maintenance and more.

== Environment ==
There are procedures in place to minimize the amount of pollution in the water while fishing. If a spill were to take place on a vessel, the first thing is to minimize the amount and prevent as much from entering the water. A pollution kit should be aboard every vessel in case of a spill.

== See also ==
- List of harvested aquatic animals by weight
