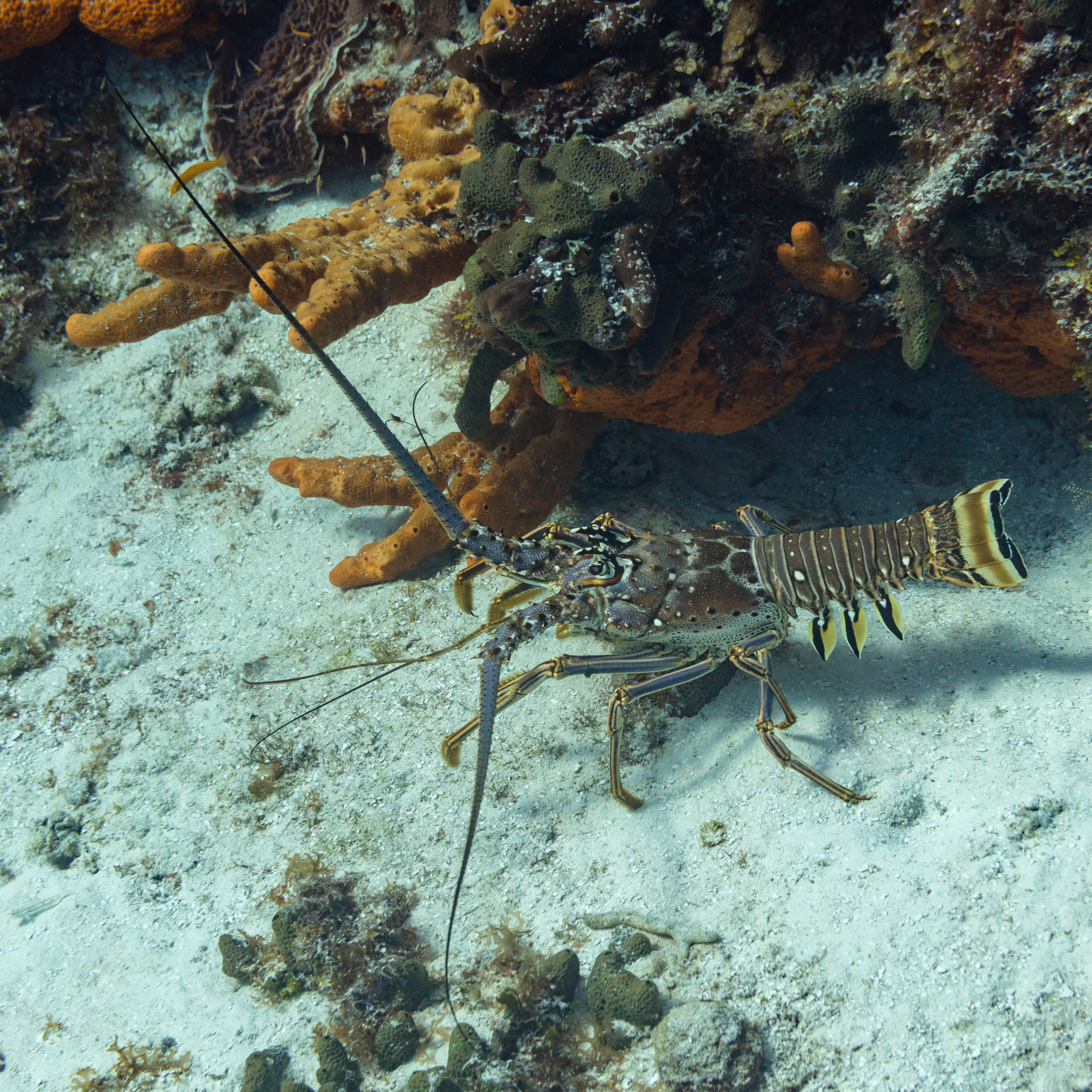

Conservation status
- Data Deficient (IUCN 3.1)

Scientific classification
- Kingdom: Animalia
- Phylum: Arthropoda
- Clade: Pancrustacea
- Class: Malacostraca
- Order: Decapoda
- Suborder: Pleocyemata
- Family: Palinuridae
- Genus: Panulirus
- Species: P. argus

Binomial name
- Panulirus argus (Latreille, 1804)

Synonyms
- Palinurus argus Latreille, 1804; Palinurus ricordi Guérin-Méneville, 1836; Palinurus americanus H. Milne-Edwards, 1837

= Panulirus argus =

Species of crustacean

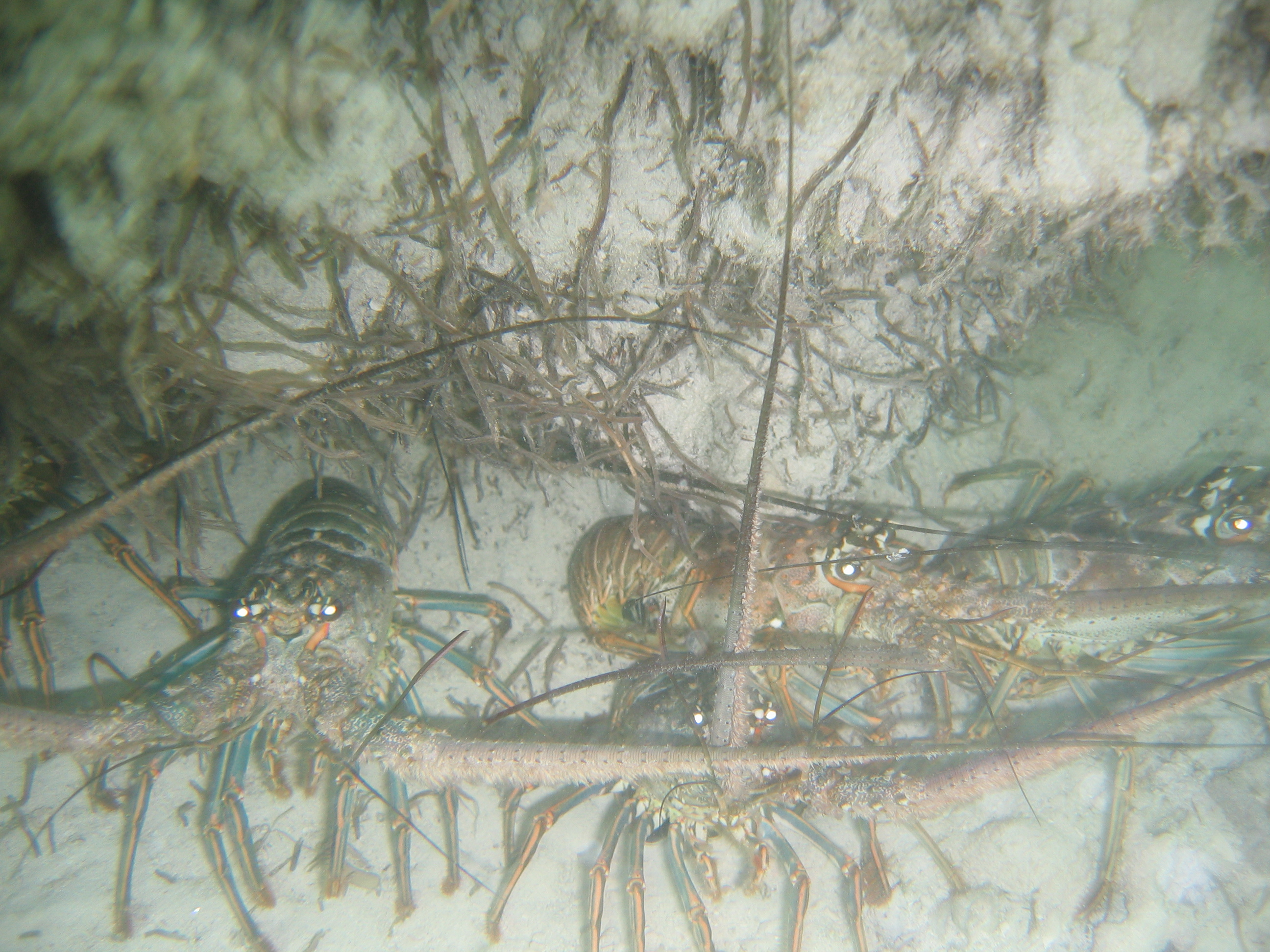
Four spiny lobsters off the Florida coast

Panulirus argus, the Caribbean spiny lobster, is a species of spiny lobster that lives on reefs and in mangrove swamps in the western Atlantic Ocean.

== Anatomy ==
P. argus have long, cylindrical bodies covered with spines. Two large spines form forward-pointing "horns" above the eyestalks. They are generally olive greenish or brown, but can be tan to mahogany. There is a scattering of yellowish to cream-colored spots on the carapace and larger (usually four to six) yellow to cream-colored spots on the abdomen. They have one pair of antennae that are longer than the body, and covered with forward pointing spines. The bases of the second antennae are thick, can have a bluish tinge, and are likewise covered with rows of spines. The legs are usually striped longitudinally with blue and yellow and terminate in a single spine-like point. The somites of the abdomen are smooth and have a shallow furrow across the middle. Each has pairs of swimmerets on the underside that are yellow and black. The lobes of the tail are colored similarly to the swimmerets.

P. argus may reach up to 60 cm (24 in) long, but typically around 20 cm (7.9 in), and is fished throughout its range. Sexual maturity in females is reached at a carapace length of 54–80 mm (2.1–3.1 in).

== Biology ==
Like most decapods, P. argus hatches from eggs carried externally by the female for around four weeks. They begin life as a free-swimming, microscopic phyllosoma larvae. After about one year, the larvae settle in algae (Laurencia sp., Neogoniolithon sp.), in Thalassia testudinum seagrass beds or among mangrove roots. After undergoing several molts, they migrate to the coral reefs and live in holes or crevices. As they grow, they molt or shed their exoskeleton to make room for their larger bodies. As in other decapods, after molting, the new exoskeleton or shell is soft, and has to harden. During this time, the lobster is highly vulnerable to predation and as a result they are usually very retiring until the new exoskeleton hardens fully. The diet is mostly composed of mollusks and chitons, but they also consume crustaceans, worms, sea urchins, detritus, vegetable material, and dead animals and fish they find on the bottom.

P. argus is a nocturnal species, taking to cover during the day. While lunar cycle affects their larvae settlement in part, it variably affects adult activity based on location and other undetermined factors. Adult P. argus demonstrate physiological resilience to human-caused light pollution.

P. argus serve as prey for skates, nurse sharks, octopuses, snappers and groupers. They were the first major fisheries species found to be directly supported by chemosynthetic primary productivity from their prey, as opposed to photosynthetic primary productivity.

Although they generally prefer to remain near cover, at times groups of hundreds will line up and march across the floor off Florida and the Bahamas. The purpose of these migrations is not known, but they generally occur in the fall and may be in response to the onset of autumn storms.

== Habitat ==
Individuals can be found at depths of up to 100 m (330 ft) from Rio de Janeiro, Brazil to Beaufort, North Carolina, including the Caribbean Sea, the Bahamas and Bermuda, with occasional reports from West Africa. Although they range throughout the entire Gulf of Mexico, in the northern portions of the Gulf they generally are only found at depths of 33 m (108 ft) and greater due to the seasonal variation in the water temperature. Around the southern portion of the Florida peninsula and throughout the Bahamas and Caribbean, they are found in shallower water. They generally prefer habitat with some sort of cover and can be found around coral reefs, artificial reefs, sponges, bridge pilings, wooden bridge bumpers, piers, and under the prop roots of mangroves.

== Human consumption ==
P. argus is a popular seafood item for human consumption. It is the most important food export of the Bahamas, and rivals the shrimp industry in the Florida Keys in commercial value. They are eagerly sought by both commercial lobstermen and sport divers in South Florida, the Caribbean, the Bahamas, and Bermuda.

In Florida, there is a season where the spiny lobster may be taken, usually from the beginning of August to the end of March, to protect the species during its main breeding season. A special "mini season" a few days before the start of the regular lobster season gives recreational divers a "head start" in catching them. Divers catch them by gloved hand or net, often "tickling" them out of their dens with a dowel or small stick. In the Bahamas and Caribbean, they are often also speared or gigged (Florida game regulations prohibit taking them by these methods). In Bermuda, licensed individuals can only take lobsters by free-diving and using an approved noose within designated areas; all other methods and use of air tanks are prohibited. Commercial fisherman typically use lobster traps similar to those used by lobster fishermen in New England. The traps are usually baited with dead fish or chicken necks.

== Common names ==
Other common names for the species in the United States include spiny lobster, Bermuda spiny lobster, common spiny lobster, crawfish, Florida spiny lobster, West Indian langouste and West Indian spiny lobster.
