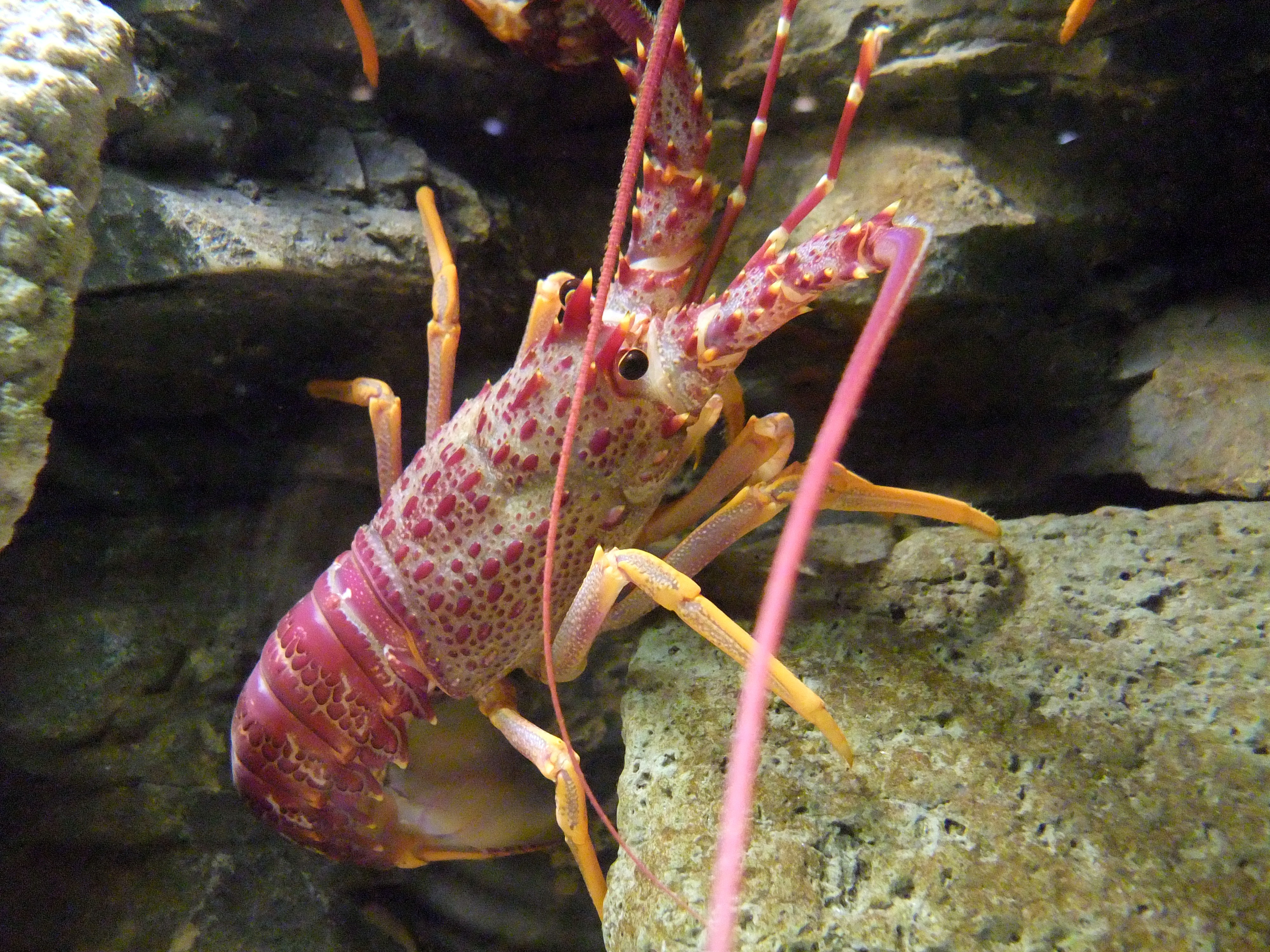
- Jasus edwardsii

Scientific classification
- Kingdom: Animalia
- Phylum: Arthropoda
- Clade: Pancrustacea
- Class: Malacostraca
- Order: Decapoda
- Suborder: Pleocyemata
- Family: Palinuridae
- Genus: Jasus; Parker, 1883

Type species
- Palinurus lalandii H. Milne-Edwards, 1837

= Jasus =

Jasus Temporal range: Miocene–Recent

Genus of spiny lobsters

Jasus is a genus of spiny lobsters which live in the oceans of the Southern Hemisphere. They have two distinct "horns" projecting from the front of the carapace, but lack the stridulating organs present in almost all other genera of spiny lobsters. Like all spiny lobsters, they lack claws, and have long stout antennae which are quite flexible.

The generic name Jasus is derived from the Ancient Greek town of Iasos (on the Mediterranean Sea, located in modern Turkey), which was famous for its prawns and stamped them on some of its coins.

== Species ==
The following species are included in the genus Jasus:

Image	Scientific name	Distribution
	Jasus caveorum Webber & Booth, 1995	southeastern Pacific Ocean
	Jasus edwardsii (Hutton, 1875)	Southern Australia: Western Australia to New South Wales & Tasmania. South Island of New Zealand
	Jasus frontalis (H. Milne-Edwards, 1837)	Juan Fernández Islands, Islas Desventuradas
	Jasus lalandii (H. Milne-Edwards, 1837)	Southern Africa (Namibia to Algoa Bay, South Africa
	Jasus paulensis (Heller, 1862)	St. Paul Island and Amsterdam Island
	Jasus tristani Holthuis, 1963	Tristan da Cunha archipelago; Vema seamount

Another species, formerly known as "Jasus verreauxi" is found around New Zealand (especially the North Island), the Chatham Islands, and around Australia (Queensland to Victoria and Tasmania); it is now placed in the genus Sagmariasus.

Approximate distributions of the extant species of Jasus, after Phillips (2006). Orange: J. caveorum; pink: J. frontalis; red: J. tristani; yellow: J. lalandii; blue: J. paulensis; green: J. edwardsii

=== Fossils ===
- †Jasus jlemingi Glaessner, 1960 - a Miocene fossil from New Zealand

== Fisheries ==
Most of the extant species are liable to commercial exploitation, with the majority of the A$4.6 million New South Wales lobster fishery industry being based on J. edwardsii and the closely related Sagmariasus verreauxi. Jasus lalandii is the most important commercial rock lobster in southern Africa.
