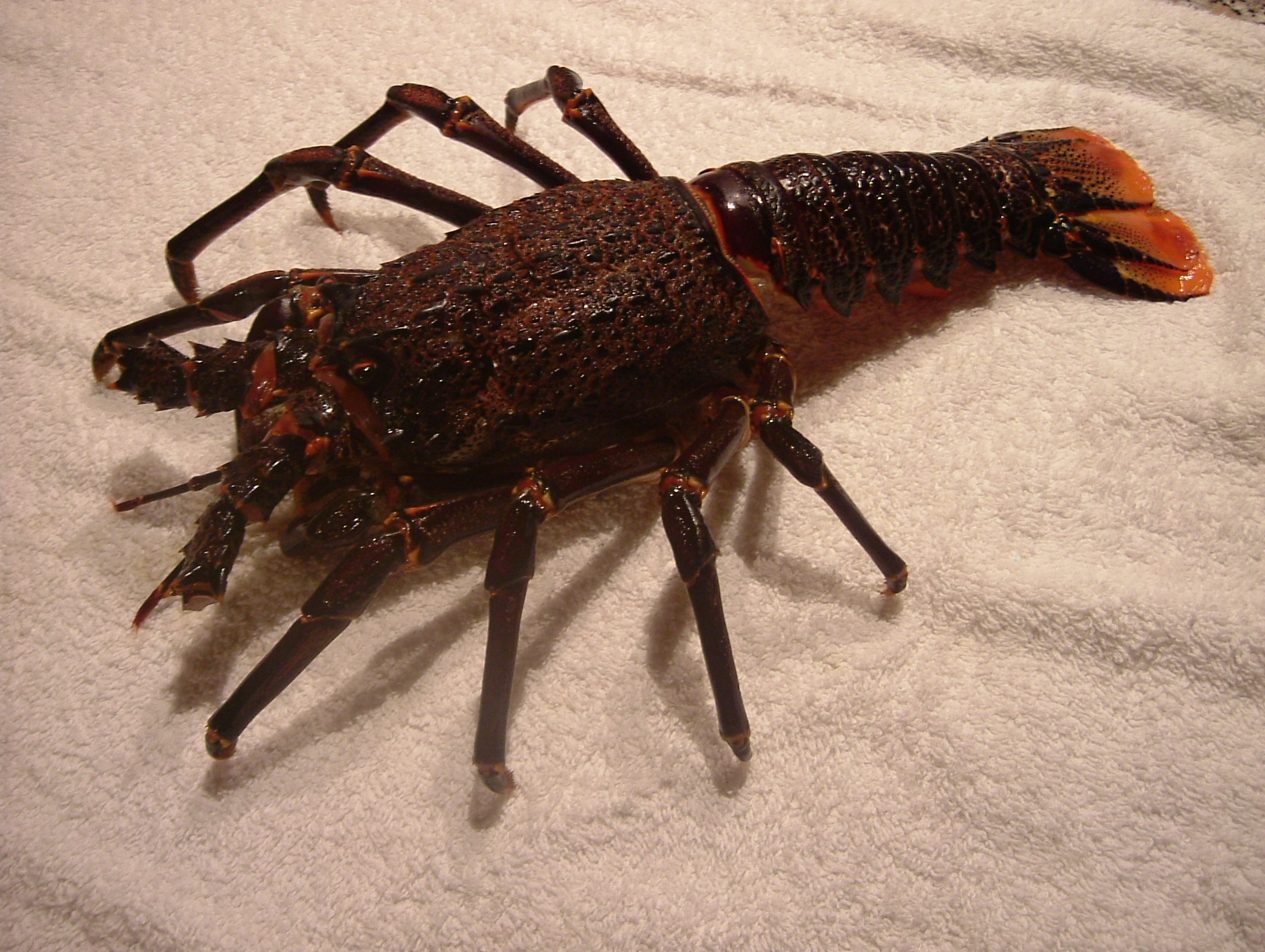

Conservation status
- Least Concern (IUCN 3.1)

Scientific classification
- Kingdom: Animalia
- Phylum: Arthropoda
- Class: Malacostraca
- Order: Decapoda
- Suborder: Pleocyemata
- Family: Palinuridae
- Genus: Jasus
- Species: J. lalandii

Binomial name
- Jasus lalandii (H. Milne-Edwards, 1837)

Synonyms
- Palinurus lalandii H. Milne-Edwards, 1837

= Jasus lalandii =

Species of spiny lobster of the family Palinuridae from South Africa

Jasus lalandii, the Cape rock lobster or West Coast rock lobster or South African rock lobster, is a species of spiny lobster found off the coast of Southern Africa. It is not known whom the specific epithet lalandii commemorates, although it may the French naturalist and taxonomer Pierre Antoine Delalande.

== Distribution ==
Jasus lalandii occurs in shallow waters from Cape Cross, Namibia to Algoa Bay, South Africa, straddling the Cape of Good Hope. It may be found as deep as 46 metres (150 ft) and is usually found on rocky bottoms.

== Culinary use ==
It is called crayfish (Afrikaans: kreef) and is often braaied, particularly in the coastal areas along its range, however overfishing has depleted stocks.

== Description ==
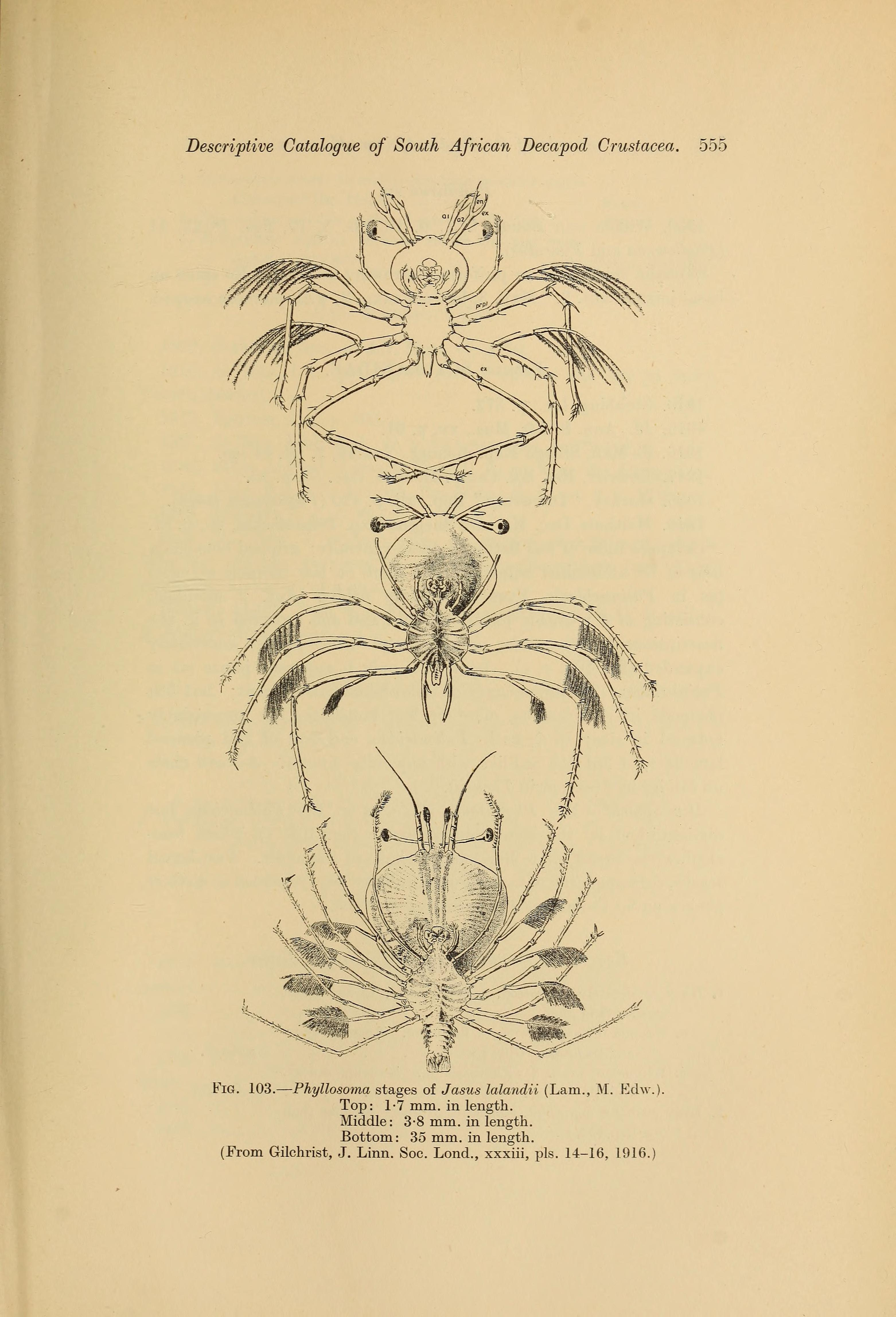
Larval forms

Orange to red-brown, with long antennae extending from the front of the head. Tail fan orange, blue and green. Thorax spiny. Eyes black and stalked.

== Ecology ==
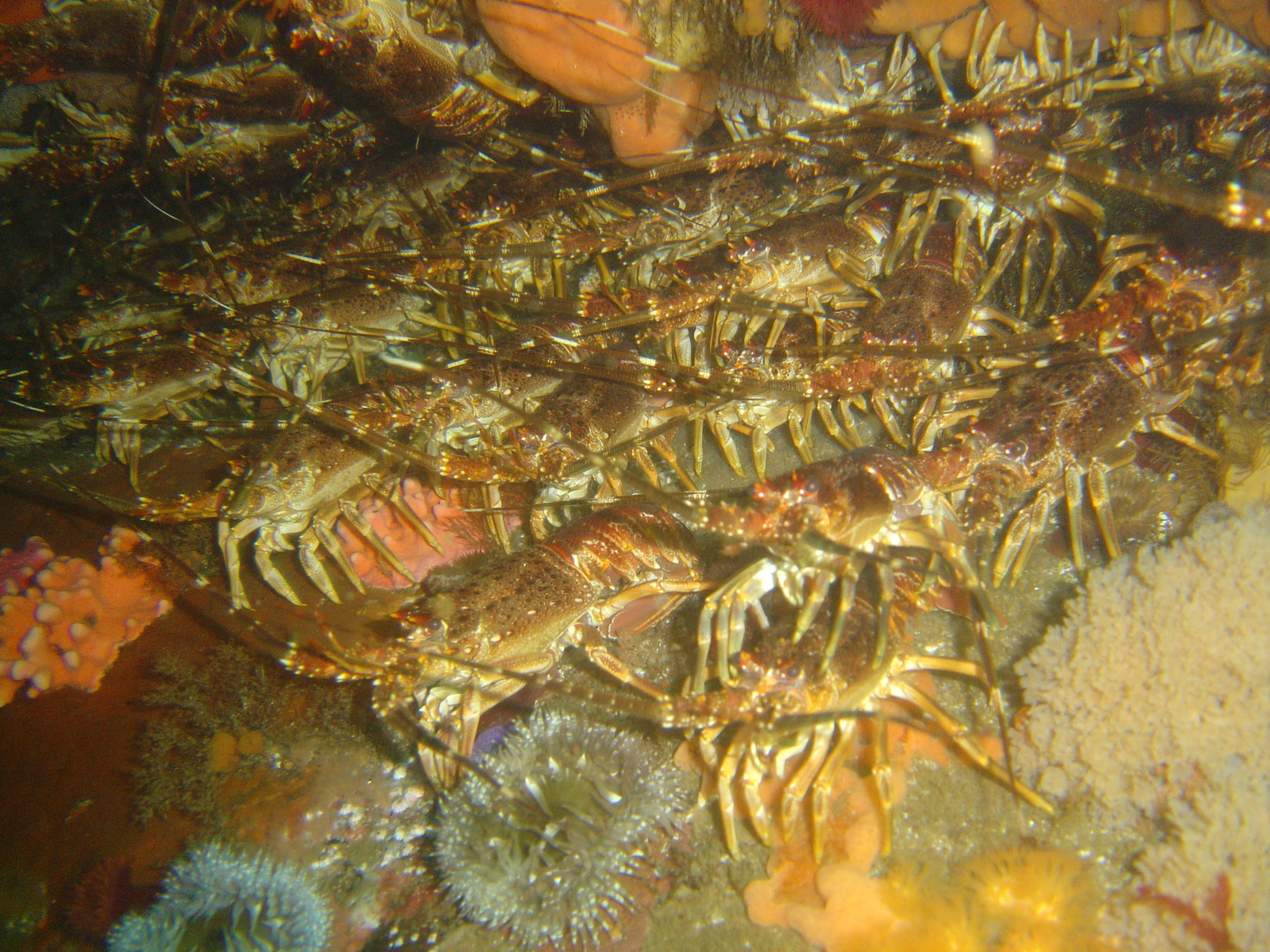
A group of rock lobsters on a reef

Generally found on rocky reefs, where it prefers the shelter of crevices. Often seen in groups with antennae protruding from the shelter. Swims backward in emergencies using the tail, but generally crawls around on the reef.

Its predators include seals, sharks and large fish. It is susceptible to low oxygen levels in the water which may cause mass strandings.

=== Feeding ===
Jasus lalandii is a generalist predator and scavenger of mussels, sea urchins, abalone, barnacles, among other thing. When both abalone and sea urchins are available, rock lobsters preferentially feed on abalone. Which could be due to the higher calorific value of the sea urchins. In its choice for sea snails it selects prey below the critical size as attacking these prey is likely to involve the least risk. Small prey sea snails are opened by cracking the whole shell, while larger individuals are cracked sequentially by chipping parts of the shell until the muscular foot can be extracted. This indicates that overall J. lalandii optimizes the energetic returns from feeding while minimizing the risk involved.

== Fishery ==
Jasus lalandii may grow up to a total length of 46 centimetres (18 in), with a carapace length of 18 cm (7.1 in). It is widely caught for its meat, with over 6,500 t being caught annually in lobster pots and hoop nets. In order to prevent overfishing, individual fishing quotas are allocated by the Republic of South Africa to fishermen and companies, totalling 1,700 t. There is also a closed season from 1 June to 15 November, a size limit of 80 mm (carapace length) and a ban on catching ovigerous females (females which are brooding their eggs).
