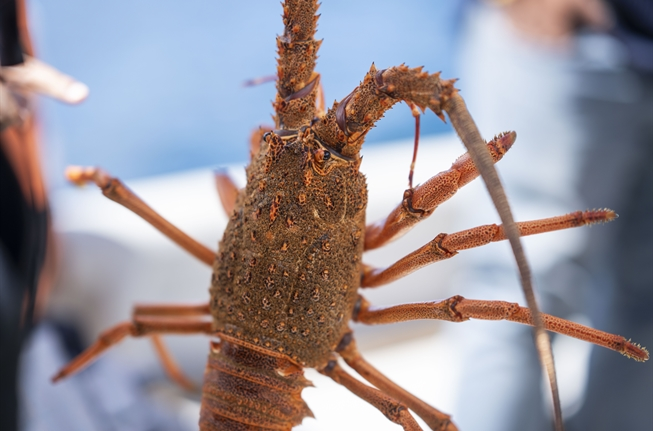

Conservation status
- Data Deficient (IUCN 3.1)

Scientific classification
- Kingdom: Animalia
- Phylum: Arthropoda
- Class: Malacostraca
- Order: Decapoda
- Suborder: Pleocyemata
- Family: Palinuridae
- Genus: Jasus
- Species: J. frontalis

Binomial name
- Jasus frontalis (H. Milne-Edwards, 1837)
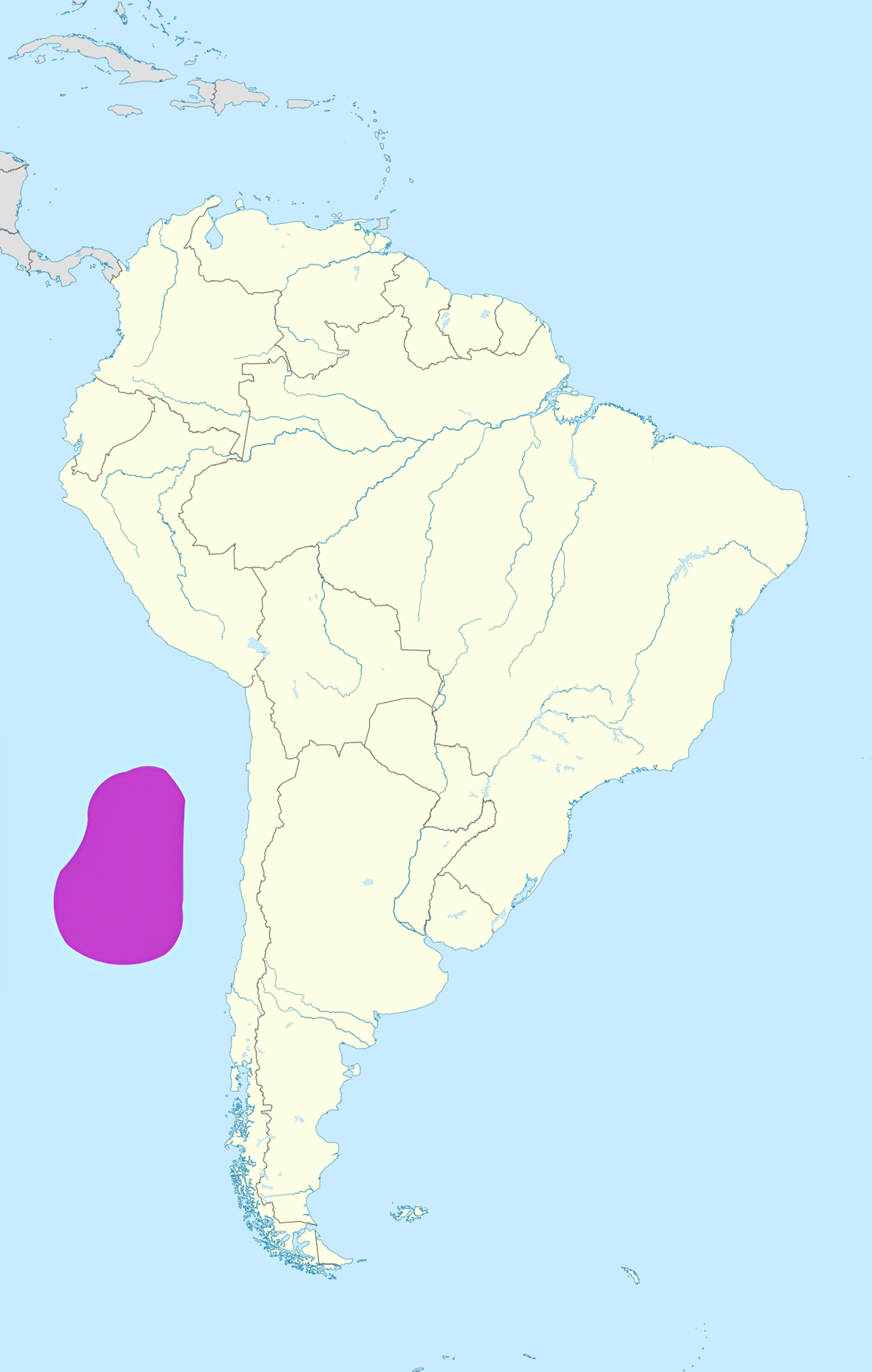

Synonyms
- Palinostus frontalis Spence Bate, 1888; Palinurus frontalis H. Milne-Edwards, 1837

= Jasus frontalis =

Species of crustacean

Jasus frontalis, known as the Juan Fernández rock lobster, is a species of spiny lobster in the genus Jasus, found around the Juan Fernández and Desventuradas Islands in the south-eastern Pacific Ocean.

== Description and life cycle ==
Male adults of Jasus frontalis reach a maximum length of 48 centimetres (19 in) (carapace length 22 cm or 8.7 in), with females slightly smaller at 46 cm (18 in) long (carapace length 19 cm or 7.5 in). Females reach sexual maturity after around seven years, when they have reached a carapace length of 75–77 mm (3.0–3.0 in). Jasus frontalis differs from the other two species in its species group – Jasus tristani and Jasus paulensis – by the lack of sculpturation on the first abdominal somite.

== Distribution and fishery ==
Jasus frontalis lives in the seas around the Juan Fernández Islands and the Desventuradas Islands, off the coast of Chile, at depths of 2–200 metres (7–656 ft), where the water is at a temperature of 13–19 °C (55–66 °F). The species was found to be plentiful and easily caught by early explorers who visited the area, such as Jacob Roggeveen (in 1722) and George Anson (in 1741). Today, J. frontalis is commercially fished throughout its range. The IUCN Red List states that while the catch has reportedly diminished and fishing efforts have increased, there is little quantifiable data on the catch per unit effort for estimating the conservation status and outlook for the species.
