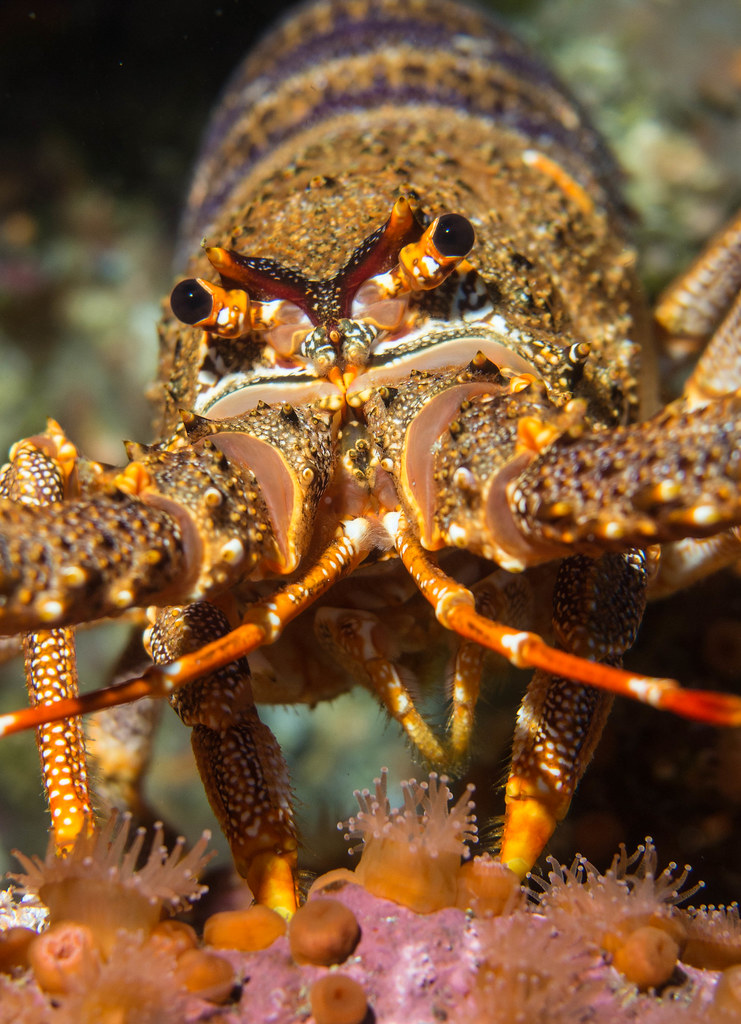

Conservation status
- Data Deficient (IUCN 3.1)

Scientific classification
- Kingdom: Animalia
- Phylum: Arthropoda
- Clade: Pancrustacea
- Class: Malacostraca
- Order: Decapoda
- Suborder: Pleocyemata
- Family: Palinuridae
- Genus: Jasus
- Species: J. paulensis

Binomial name
- Jasus paulensis (Heller, 1862)
- Jasus distribution map; J. paulensis live in the blue and red areas

Synonyms
- Jasus tristani Holthuis, 1963; Palinurus paulensis Heller, 1862

= Jasus paulensis =

Species of crustacean

Jasus paulensis, also commonly known as the St Paul rock lobster, is a species of spiny lobster found in the waters around Saint Paul Island in the southern Indian Ocean and around Tristan da Cunha in the southern Atlantic Ocean. At one time the rock lobsters on Tristan da Cunha were believed to be a separate species known as the Tristan rock lobster (Jasus tristani), but the use of mitochondrial DNA sequencing has shown them to be identical. Some authorities, for example the International Union for Conservation of Nature, retain them as separate species. The Tristan rock lobster features on the coat of arms and the flag of Tristan da Cunha.

== Description ==
The coat of arms of Tristan da Cunha features St Paul rock lobsters as supporters

Males of this species grow to a total length of about 34 cm (13 in) with a carapace length of 13 cm (5 in) while females may attain a total length of 24 cm (9 in). Like other rock lobsters, it lacks chelae (claws) on its front pair of walking legs. The carapace is armoured with large flat spines, about as wide as they are long, mixed with small spines. The first few abdominal segments are sculptured with fine transverse grooves at the front of each segment with a smoother area behind.

== Distribution and habitat ==
Although this spiny lobster was originally known only from St Paul and neighbouring New Amsterdam Islands in the southern Indian Ocean, more recently it has been discovered on other seamounts on the Southwest Indian Ridge, so its range is rather larger than originally thought. A previously recognised species Jasus tristani, found around Tristan da Cunha in the southern Atlantic Ocean, has now been synonymised with J. paulensis. This is an uncommon species throughout its range and is usually found at depths between 10 and 35 m (33 and 115 ft) but occasionally down to about 60 metres (200 ft). It is found on rocks and among kelp.

== Ecology ==
Jasus paulensis is nocturnal. It feeds on seaweeds and scavenges on dead animal material. The eggs are laid from May onwards and the female incubates them under her tail for several months.

== Fishery ==
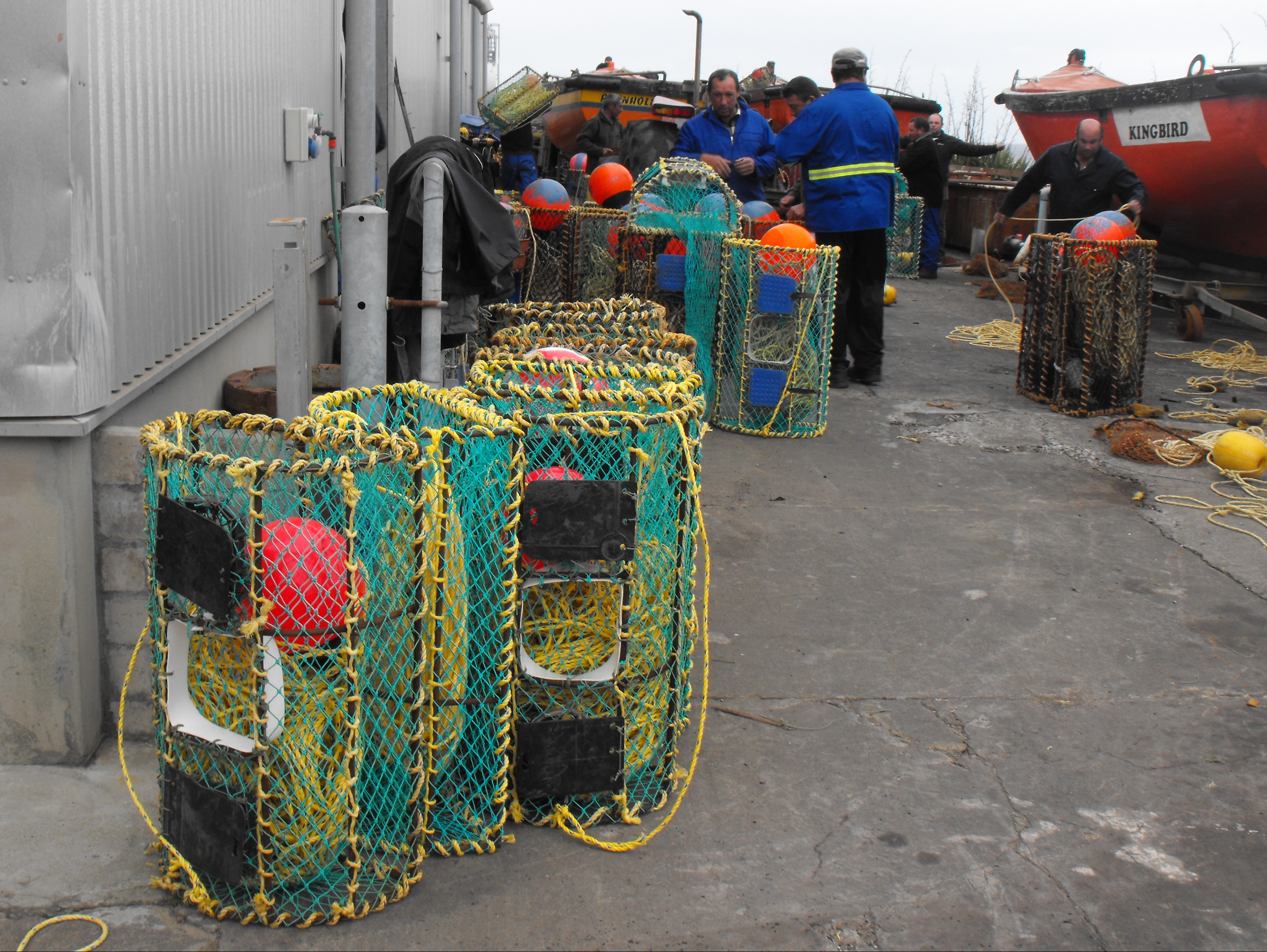
Lobster traps in Tristan da Cuhna

Early visitors to St Paul found that it was possible to catch a lobster by hand in shallow water in the crater lake bay, take it to a nearby submarine hot spring, and cook it, without ever removing it from the water. In 1928, a large-scale fishery and cannery for the spiny lobster using lobster pots was set up on St Paul, but the company went bankrupt three years later, stranding seven people on the island and leading to a tragedy known as "Les Oubliés de Saint-Paul" (the forgotten ones of Saint-Paul). In the next two decades, there were several, largely unsuccessful, attempts to harvest the lobsters using factory ships. In the period 1950 to 1956, the spiny lobsters were harvested by the French company Sapmer with about 260 tonnes of lobster tails being processed annually (equivalent to about 800 tonnes of whole lobster). This company still operates factory vessels equipped with deep-freeze facilities in the area.

Before 1950, the rock lobster on the Tristan da Cunha archipelago was only fished for local consumption. Since then, companies such as the South Atlantic Islands Development Corporation have exploited it. Production peaked in the 1970s, with over 800 tonnes being collected in some years, but the industry has since waned, with less than 400 t being caught most years since 1992. The fishery became MSC-certified in 2011, and the current TAC total still stands at about 400 tonnes annually. Since 1996 it has been harvested by Ovenstone Agencies in a partnership with the Island Govt scheduled to last at least until 2026.
