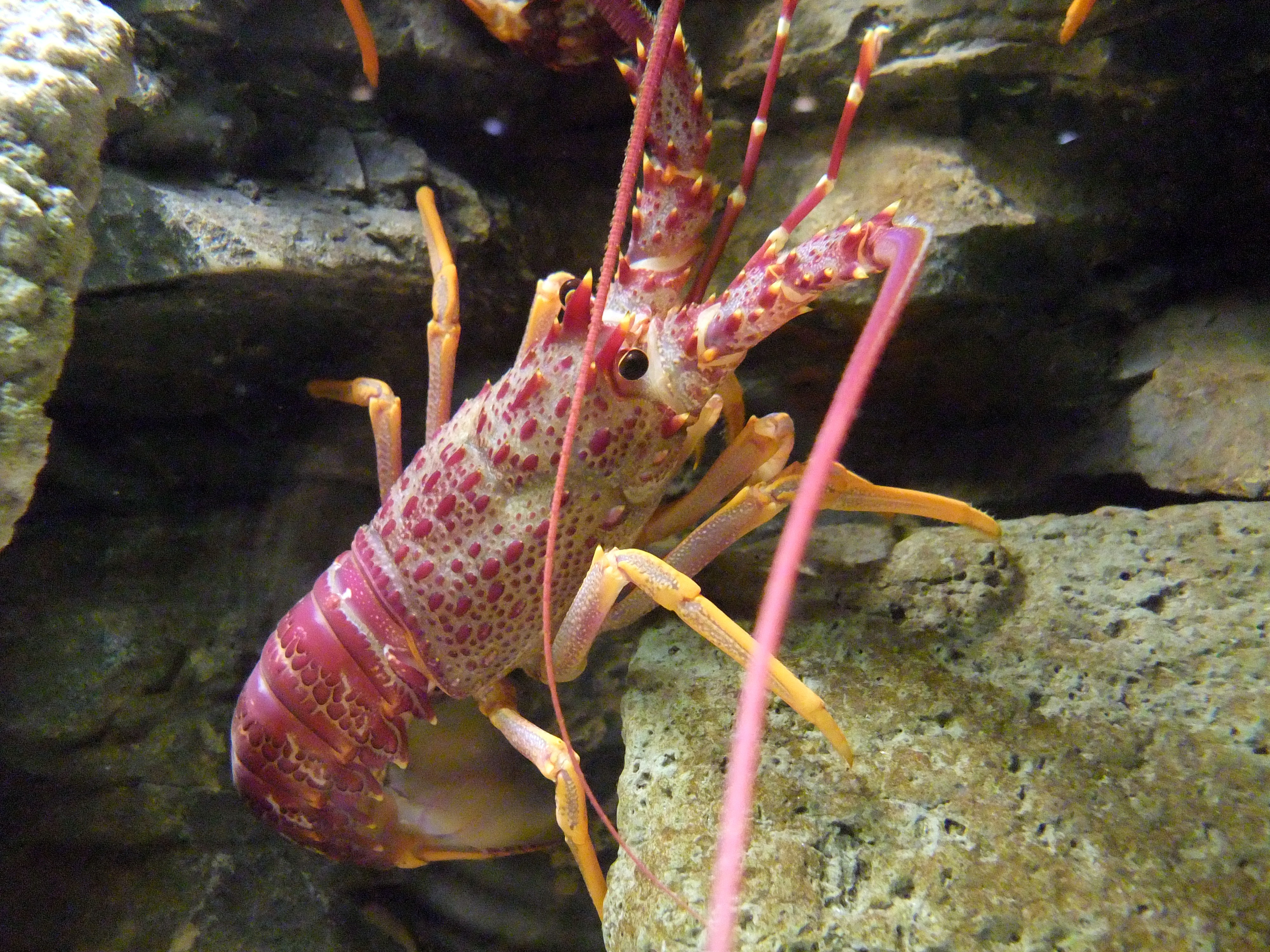

Conservation status
- Least Concern (IUCN 3.1)

Scientific classification
- Kingdom: Animalia
- Phylum: Arthropoda
- Class: Malacostraca
- Order: Decapoda
- Suborder: Pleocyemata
- Family: Palinuridae
- Genus: Jasus
- Species: J. edwardsii

Binomial name
- Jasus edwardsii (Hutton, 1875)

Synonyms
- Jasus novaehollandiae Holthuis, 1963; Palinurus edwardsii Hutton, 1875

= Jasus edwardsii =

Species of crustacean

Jasus edwardsii, the southern rock lobster, red rock lobster, or spiny rock lobster, is a species of spiny lobster found throughout coastal waters of southern Australia and New Zealand including the Chatham Islands. It is commonly called crayfish in Australia and New Zealand and kōura in Māori. They resemble lobsters, but lack the large characteristic pincers on the first pair of walking legs.

Spiny rock lobsters are carnivorous, leaving their rock cover to venture out to feed during the night. They live in and around reefs at depths ranging from 5–200 metres (16–660 ft) deep at the continental shelf. They can be dark red and orange above with paler yellowish abdomens or grey-green brown with the paler underside. The more tropical animals tend to have the brighter colours. Adult carapaces can grow up to 230 millimetres (9.1 in) in length and can often exceed 8 kilograms (18 lb) in underfished areas.

== Distribution ==
Jasus edwardsii is found around most of the coast of New Zealand, including the three main islands, the Three Kings Islands, the Chatham Islands, the Snares Islands, the Bounty Islands, the Antipodes Islands and the Auckland Islands. This last locality is the southernmost place where spiny lobsters occur in the world. In Australia, J. edwardsii is found around the southern coast, from central New South Wales to southern Western Australia, including Tasmania.

== Life cycle ==
Adults are sexually mature at between 7 and 11 years, mating occurs during late summer and autumn. Eggs develop on females, which carry between 100,000 and 500,000 eggs which are fertilised and held below the tail on hairs on the female's abdomen. The eggs develop here for 3 to 5 months. Eggs then metamorphose into naupliosoma larva which leave the female and are free swimming plankton which migrate towards the surface where they moult into a phyllosoma larva.

The rock lobster has among the longest larval development known for any marine creature. The phyllosoma (Greek for "leaf-like") larvae spend between 9 months to 2 years in oceanic waters before metamorphosing to the post larval stage, known as the puerulus, which then swims towards the coast to settle.

== Size ==
The maximum total body length is 58 centimetres (23 in) for males, and 43 centimetres (17 in) for females. The maximum carapace lengths are 23.5 centimetres (9.3 in) for males and 18 centimetres (7.1 in) for females. Minimum legal carapace lengths vary depending on location. In some areas, Jasus edwardsii are frequently harvested weighing over 4.5 kilograms (9.9 lb).

== As food ==
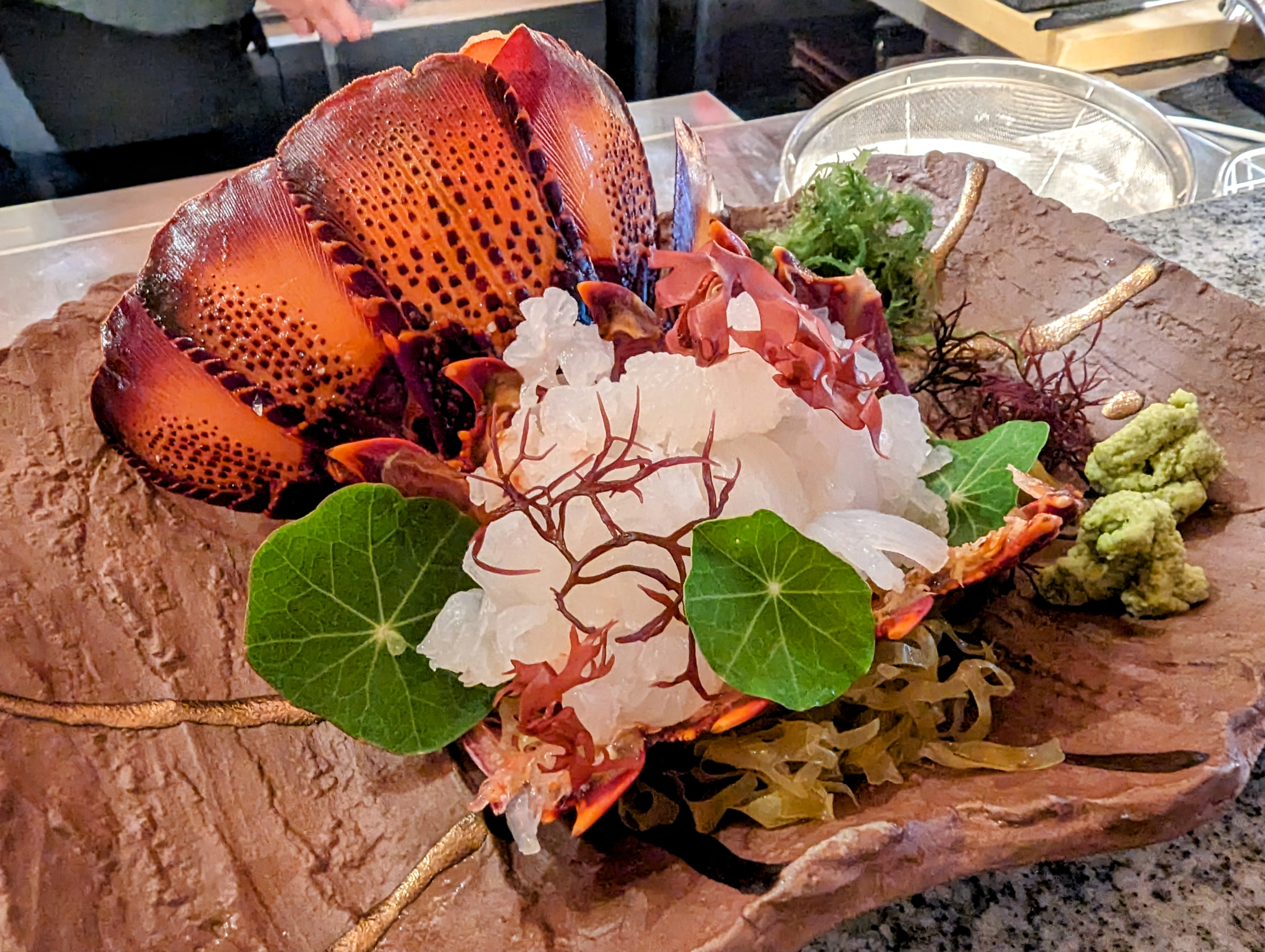
Jasus edwardsii served raw Japanese-style as sashimi

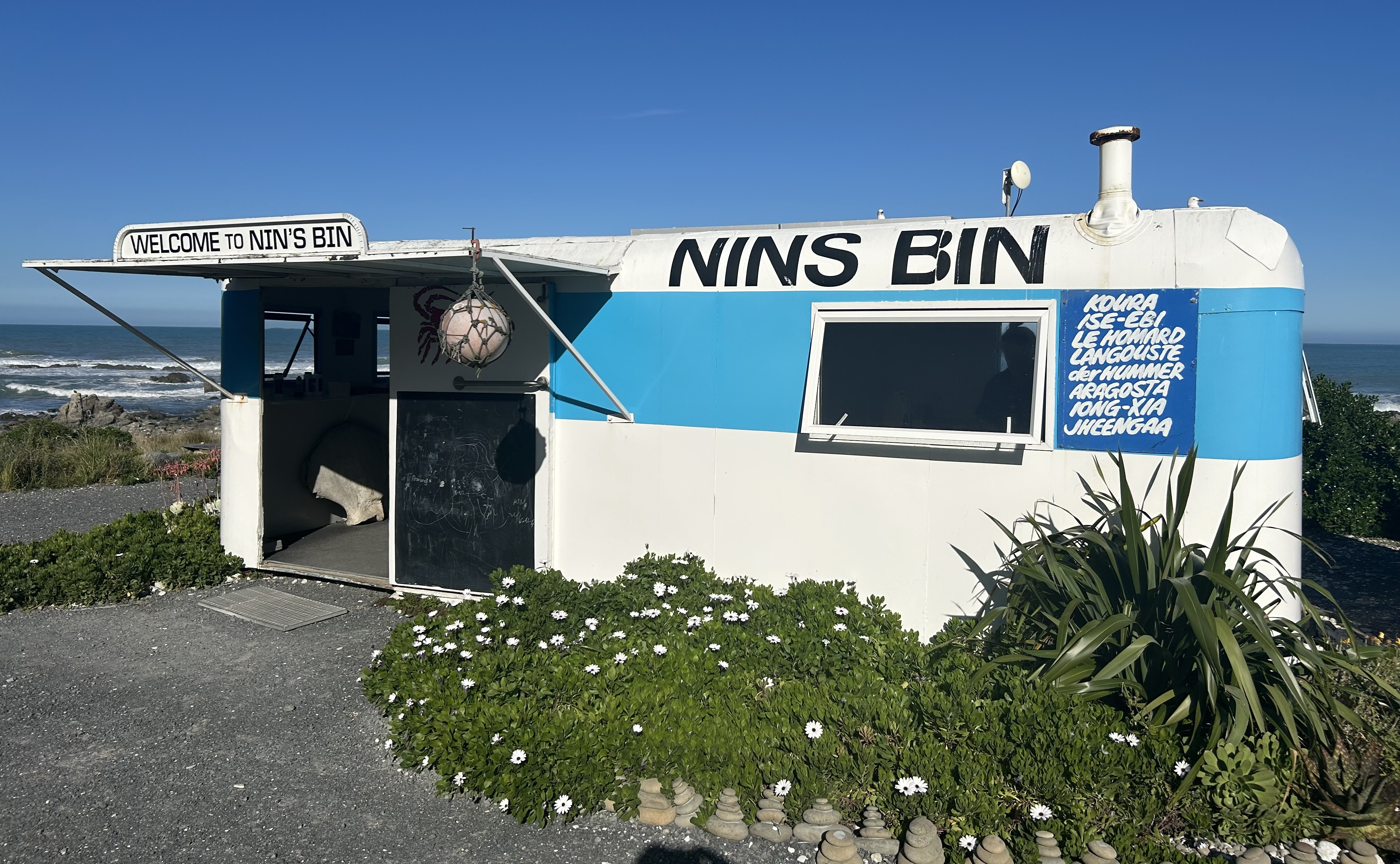
Roadside crayfish (Jasus edwardsii) stand, Kaikōura, New Zealand

Jasus edwardsii is prized by consumers in Oceania, China and South-East Asia for its sweet, succulent flesh. Like true lobster, it can be served boiled, steamed, grilled or raw. A$250 million worth are harvested every year in Australia alone.

== Aquaculture ==
The potential for Jasus edwardsii to become an aquaculture species in New Zealand is high. Although not commercially farmed yet, this species of lobster has a wild seed stock available and already some commercial companies are harvesting and on growing this seed stock. The National Institute of Water and Atmospheric Research (NIWA) has reared individuals from egg to adult, showing that it is possible to grow this species in captivity, although it takes between 200 and 400 days to reach maturity.

This species is also a potential aquaculture species in Australia. There is already a well established export of wild rock lobster from Australia, especially Southern Australia which currently lands just over 3000 tonnes a year. An aquaculture of this species would serve to bulk up the wild catch and add value with high quality grown lobsters.

South Australia currently does have limited aquaculture of Jasus edwardsii, keeping legal sized individuals from the fishery in cages in Kangaroo Island to make them available in the off season, ensuring a year-round supply to market, although no aquaculture from juveniles or eggs is done yet.

=== Food ===
NIWA used primarily brine shrimp to feed the juvenile lobsters, but little is known about a preferred food source. Chopped up mussel flesh has been used previously in Japan. Both these techniques carry some potential disadvantages – brine shrimp can introduce disease, and mussels deteriorate once introduced to the water, giving bacteria an environment to grow on. A study has shown that mussels provide the best food along with a carbohydrate source in the form of agar, allowing faster grow rates in the lobster.

=== Techniques ===
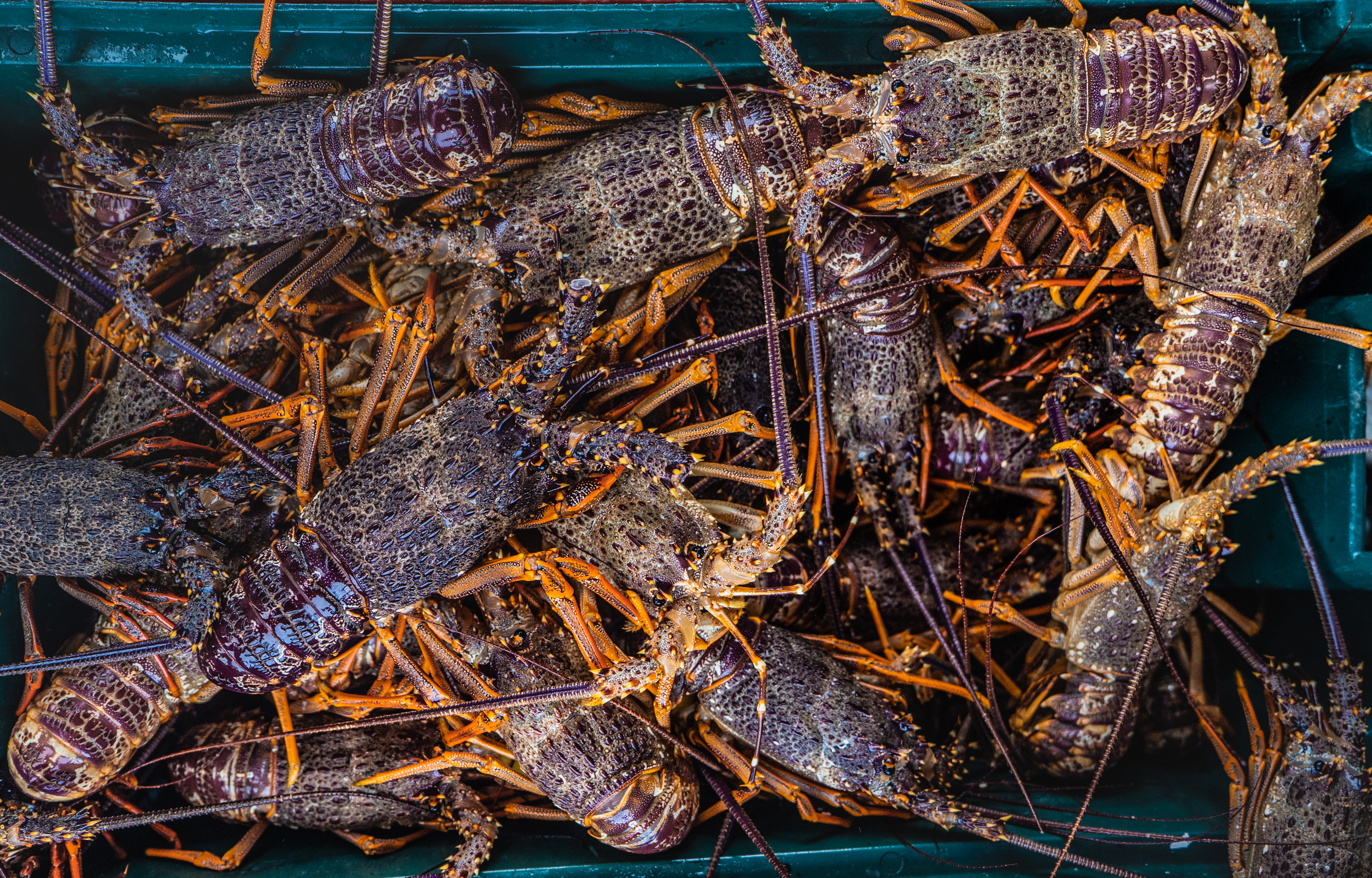
A catch of Jasus edwardsii, Kaikōura, New Zealand

The most promising technique for aquaculture in New Zealand is sea cages. These have been successfully used internationally to grow similar species. In Vietnam sea cages are used to grow large amounts of Panulirus ornatus (ornate spiny lobster) in excess of 1,500 t valued at US$90 million. This species is also commercially cultured in Indonesia and the Philippines.

There are three main types of sea cage – floating, wooden fixed, and submerged.

- Floating cages as the name suggests are floating, nets are supported by floating buoys which are connected using a frame. They are often far above the seabed in waters 10–20 m (33–66 ft) deep in calm bays. This type of cage is used in Nga Trang Bay in Vietnam. Wooden fixed cages are near the bottom, or on the bottom of the sea and each net is attached to salt resistant wooden stakes driven into the ground in squares with nets between them. These may be on the seabed with sand covering the bottom of the cage. These cages are used in Van Phong Bay in Vietnam.
- Submerged cages are sealed cubic cages with feeding holes in one end that are attached to the seabed. Similar to crab and crayfish pots used to catch adults. These cages are used in Cam Ranh Bay, Vietnam. Often the materials used to make these cages are sourced locally, in the form of nets from fishing, wood and other framing materials and floats.
- There has been experimental work done in New Zealand with suspended cages which resulted in good grow rates and survivability as long as suitable sites are picked.

=== Sites ===
The sites for lobster farms should be in shallow water (not exceeding 20 m) and sheltered from currents and swell as well as potential strong winds. Often behind islands and in sheltered bays are the best sites as the sea cages are easily damaged by swell and high winds. Also the type of sea cage affects the site, floating and submerged cages can be in deeper water, and wooden fixed cages have to be in water only a few metres deep.

=== Seed stock ===
Due to the time it takes larva to develop (up to two years) the most cost-effective method of lobster aquaculture is to harvest wild pueruli. This has been done in Vietnam and has been done previously in New Zealand. This would allow a faster grow time to adults as the caught juvenile will have already had months of growth before being put in cages for aquaculture. There is a good source of pueruli in New Zealand (in places like Gisborne) and research into effective catching of pueruli is currently being done. Research suggests a 'bottle brush' collector as the most effective way, a mesh material attached to a PVC core resembling a bottle brush.

The maximum sustainable yield of this seed stock is unknown and research will have to be carried out to determine this before an industry can be founded.

=== Market ===
This species provides New Zealand with a high price point aquaculture species in an industry dominated by low price species. New Zealand baited pot wild lobsters earn approximately $180 million per annum which is limited by the Quota Management System to a total allowable commercial catch (TACC) of 2,981 metric tonnes.

== See also ==
- Western rock lobster
- Kaikōura
- Sagmariasus
