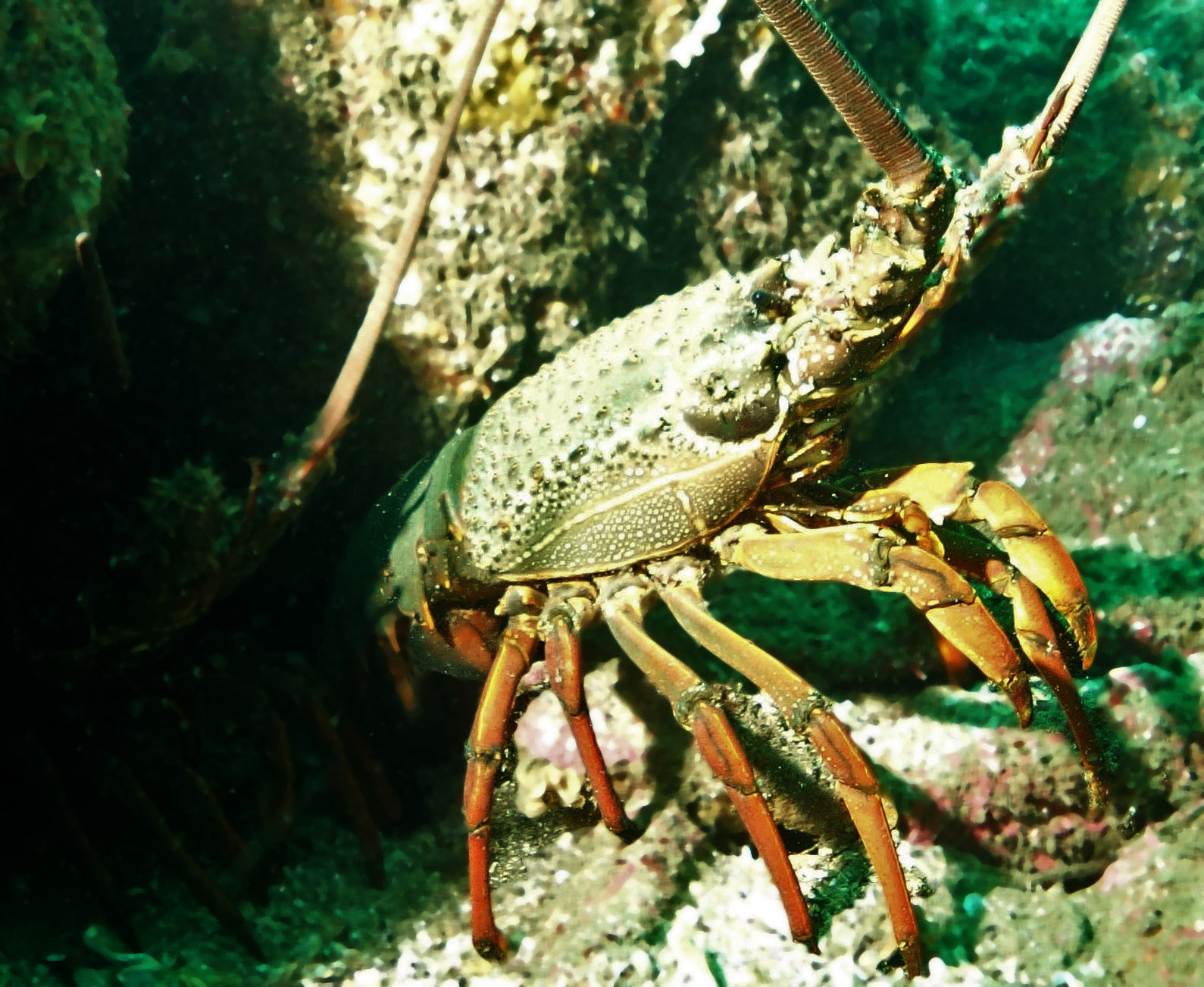

Conservation status
- Least Concern (IUCN 3.1)

Scientific classification
- Kingdom: Animalia
- Phylum: Arthropoda
- Class: Malacostraca
- Order: Decapoda
- Suborder: Pleocyemata
- Family: Palinuridae
- Genus: Sagmariasus; Holthuis, 1991
- Species: S. verreauxi

Binomial name
- Sagmariasus verreauxi (H. Milne-Edwards, 1851)

Synonyms
- Palinurus verreauxi H. Milne-Edwards, 1851; Jasus verreauxi (H. Milne-Edwards, 1851); Palinurus huegelii Heller, 1862; Palinurus tumidus Kirk, 1880; Palinurus giganteus Kirk, 1880; Jasus huegelii Ortmann, 1891; Palinosytus huegelii Stebbing, 1893

= Sagmariasus =

Species of crustacean

Sagmariasus verreauxi is a species of spiny lobster that lives around northern New Zealand, the Kermadec Islands the Chatham Islands and Australia from Queensland to Tasmania. It is probably the longest decapod crustacean in the world, alongside the American lobster Homarus americanus, growing to lengths of up to 60 centimetres (24 in).

== Names ==
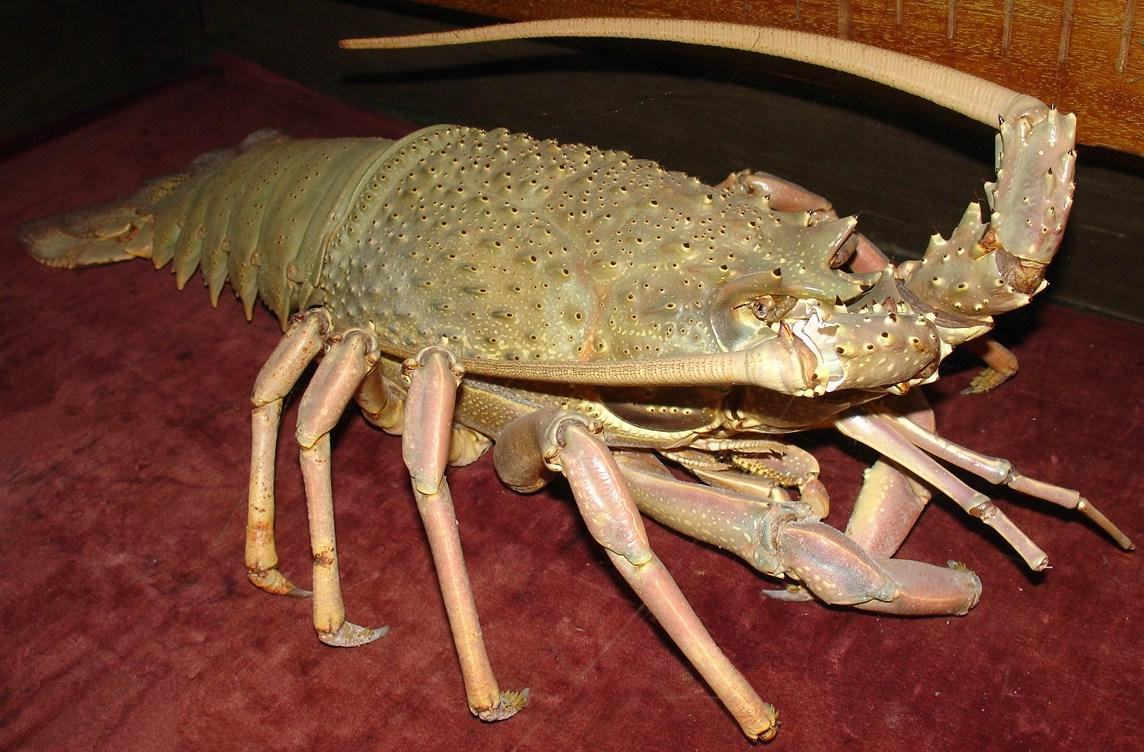
Model of Sagmariasus verreauxi

The species has many common names in English, including Australian crayfish, common crayfish, common Sydney crayfish, eastern crayfish, eastern rock lobster, green cray, green crayfish, green lobster, green rock lobster, marine crayfish, New South Wales spiny lobster, packhorse crayfish, packhorse lobster, sea crayfish, smooth-tailed crayfish and Sydney crayfish. In Māori, it is called pawharu. S. verreauxi was formerly included in the genus Jasus, but has been separated into a monotypic genus Sagmariasus due to the lack of sculpturation on the abdomen, which is found in all other Jasus species. The name Sagmarasius derives from the Greek σαγμαριον (sagmarion), meaning packhorse, and the genus name Jasus, in reference to the common name "packhorse crayfish".

== Human context ==
During the early 20th Century, Sagmariasus verrauxi and Jasus edwardsii were one of the cheapest seafoods in New Zealand, with European New Zealanders preferring the taste of British crayfish, Austropotamobius pallipes. Large hauls of Sagmariasus verrauxi were harvested in Northland, either sold cheaply or used as chickenfeed. Sagmariasus verrauxi was occasionally considered a pest that impacted fishing numbers, leading fishermen to occasionally destroy the crayfish. Populations of Sagmariasus verrauxi declined by the 1970s.
