= Lobster trap =

Portable trap used in lobster fishing

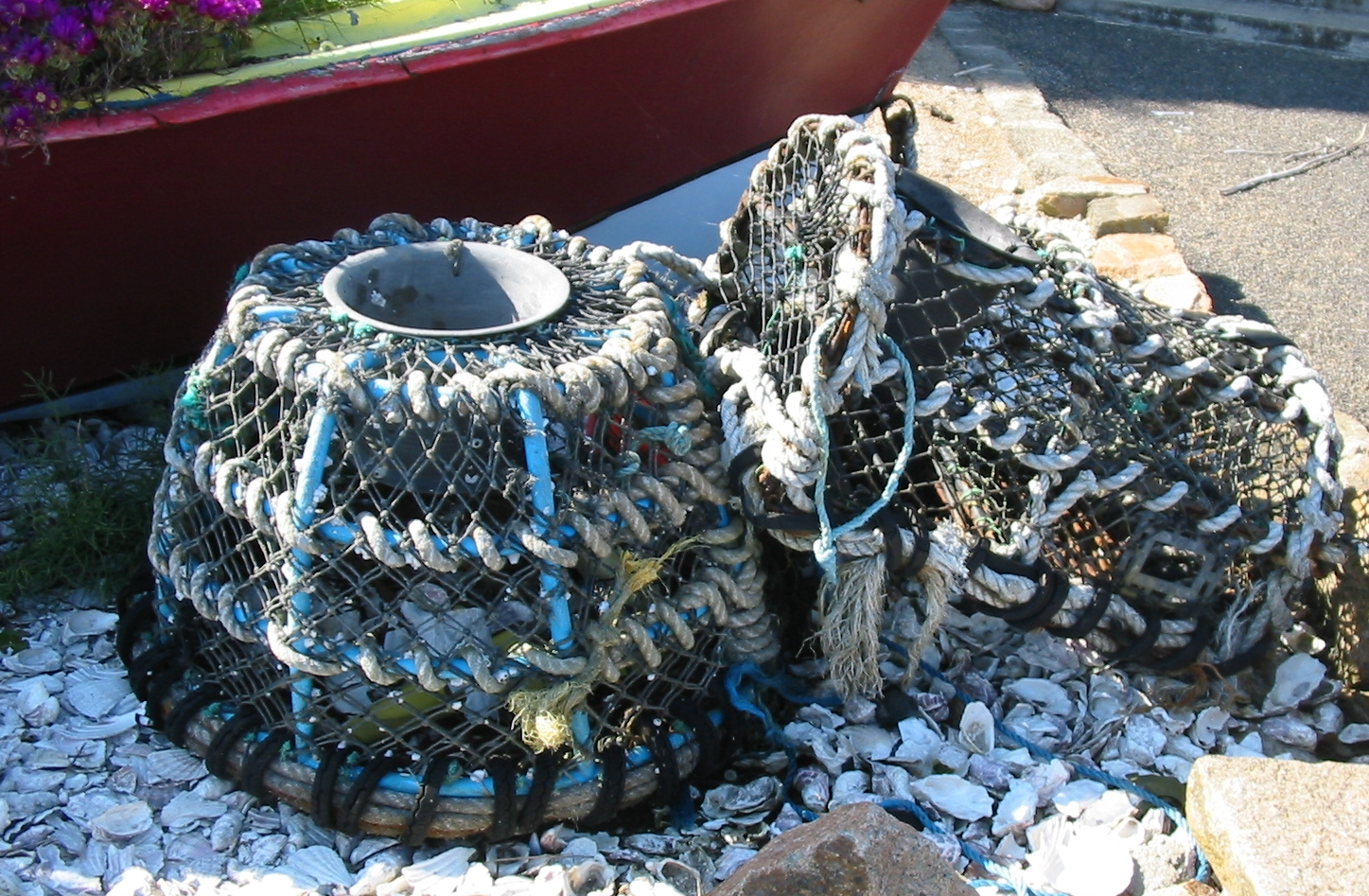
Lobster pots in Jersey

A lobster trap or lobster pot is a portable trap that traps lobsters or crayfish and is used in lobster fishing. In Scotland (chiefly in the north), the word creel was used to refer to a device used to catch lobsters and other crustaceans. A lobster trap can hold several lobsters. Lobster traps can be constructed of wire and wood, metal and netting, or rigid plastic. An opening permits the lobster to enter a tunnel of netting or other one-way device. Pots are sometimes constructed in two parts, called the "chamber" or "kitchen", where there is bait, and exits into the "parlor", which prevents escape. Lobster pots are usually dropped to the sea floor, one or more at a time, sometimes up to 40 or more, and are marked by a buoy so they can be picked up later.

== Description ==
The trap can consist of a wood frame surrounded by mesh. The majority of the newer traps found in the Northeast of the US and the Canadian Maritimes consist of a plastic-coated metal frame. A piece of bait, often fish or chum, is placed inside the trap, and the traps are dropped onto the sea floor. A long rope is attached to each trap, at the end of which is a plastic or styrofoam buoy that bears the owner's license number. The entrances to the traps are designed to be one-way entrances only. The traps are checked every other day by the fisherman and rebaited if necessary. One study indicated that lobster traps are very inefficient and allow almost all lobsters to escape. Automatic rebaiting improves efficiency.

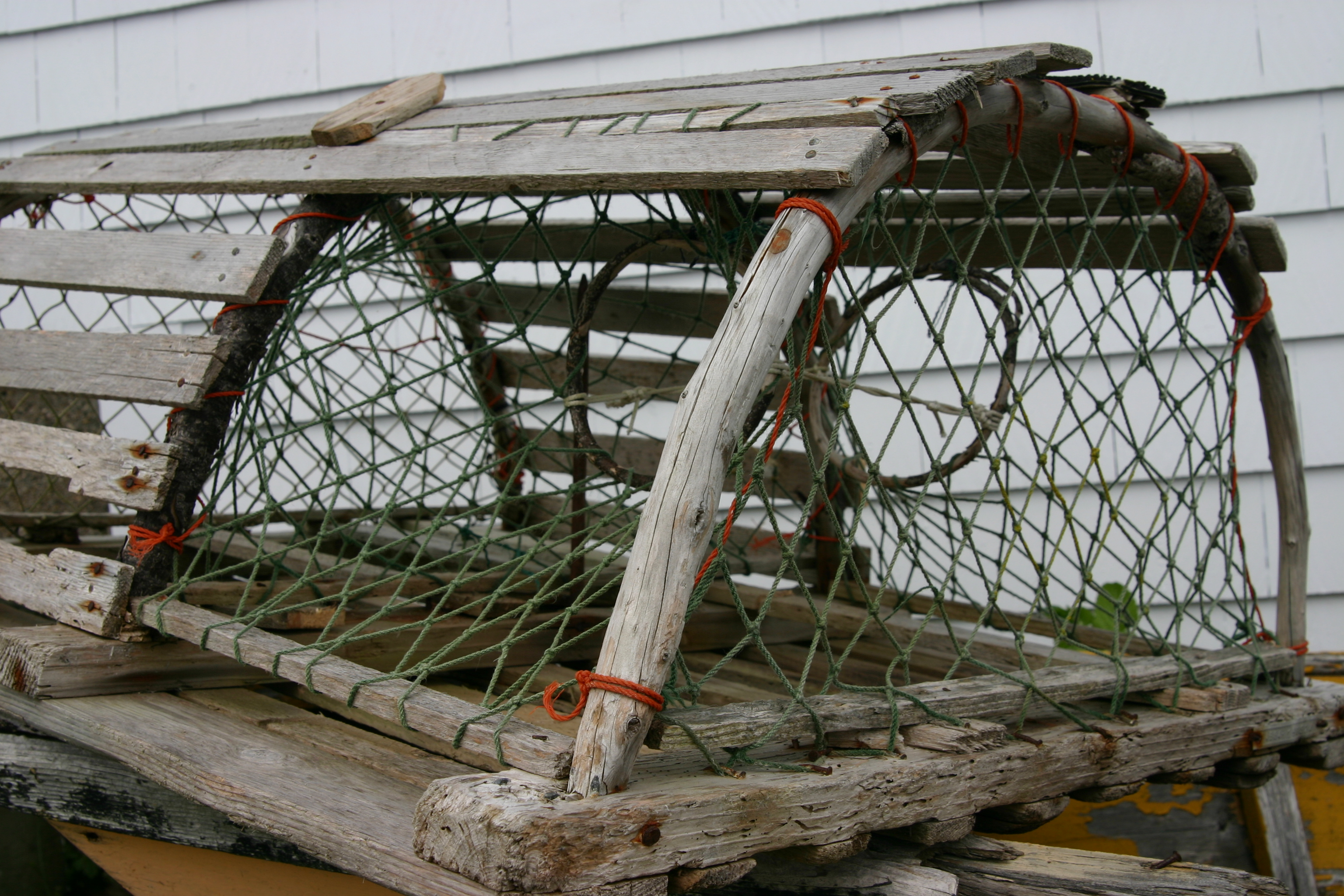
Another type of lobster trap

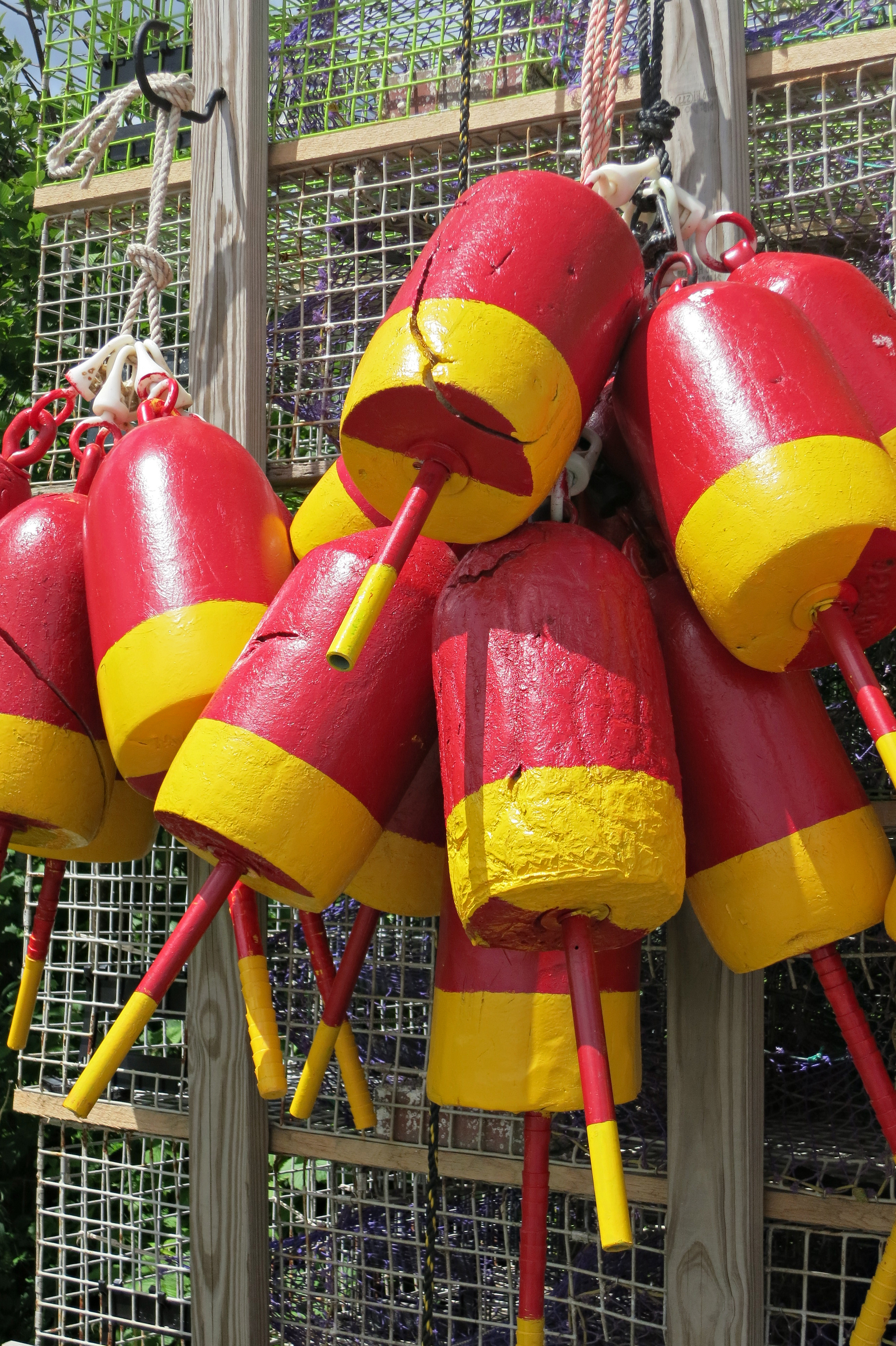
Lobster buoys

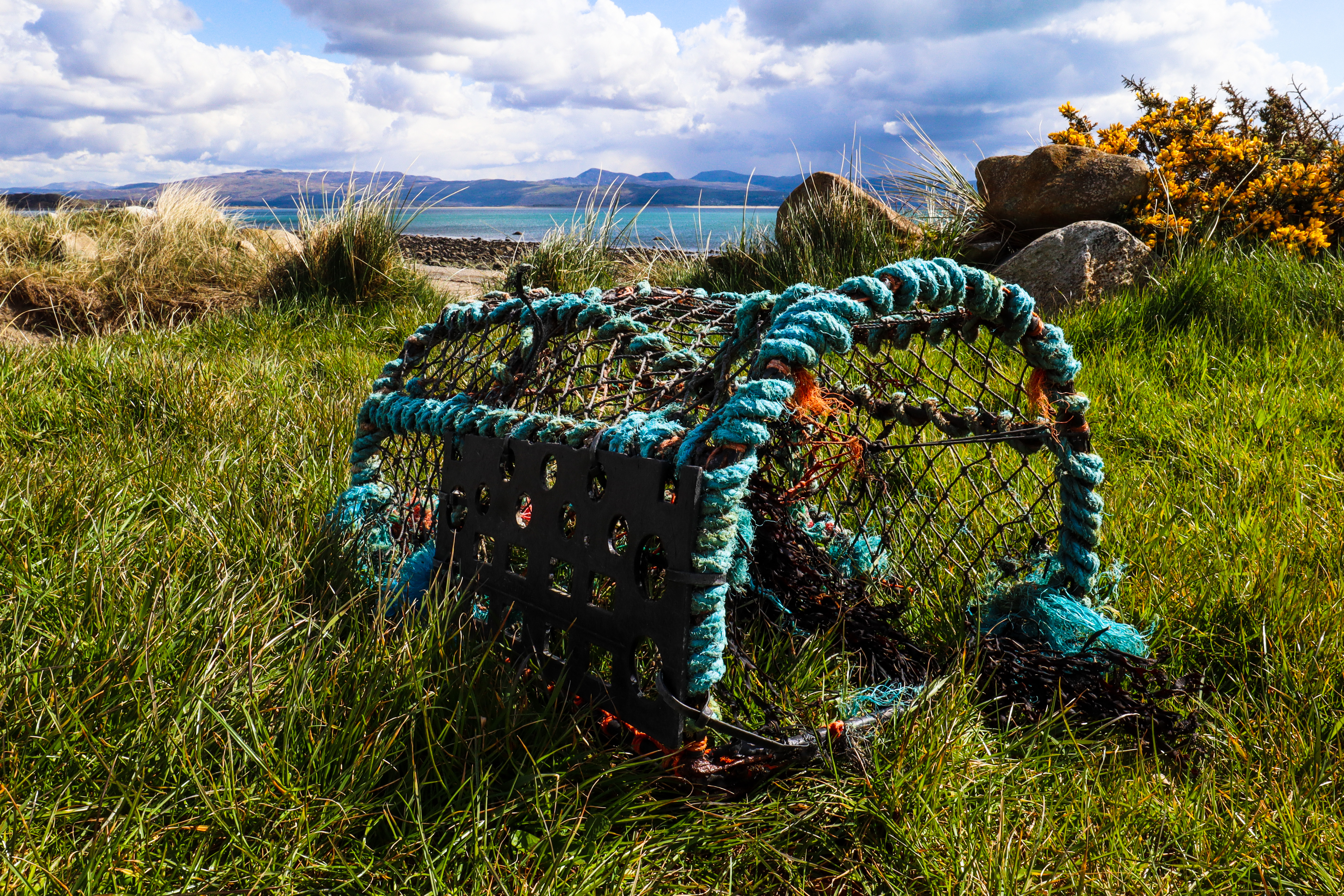
Lobster pot near Harlech, Wales; 2021

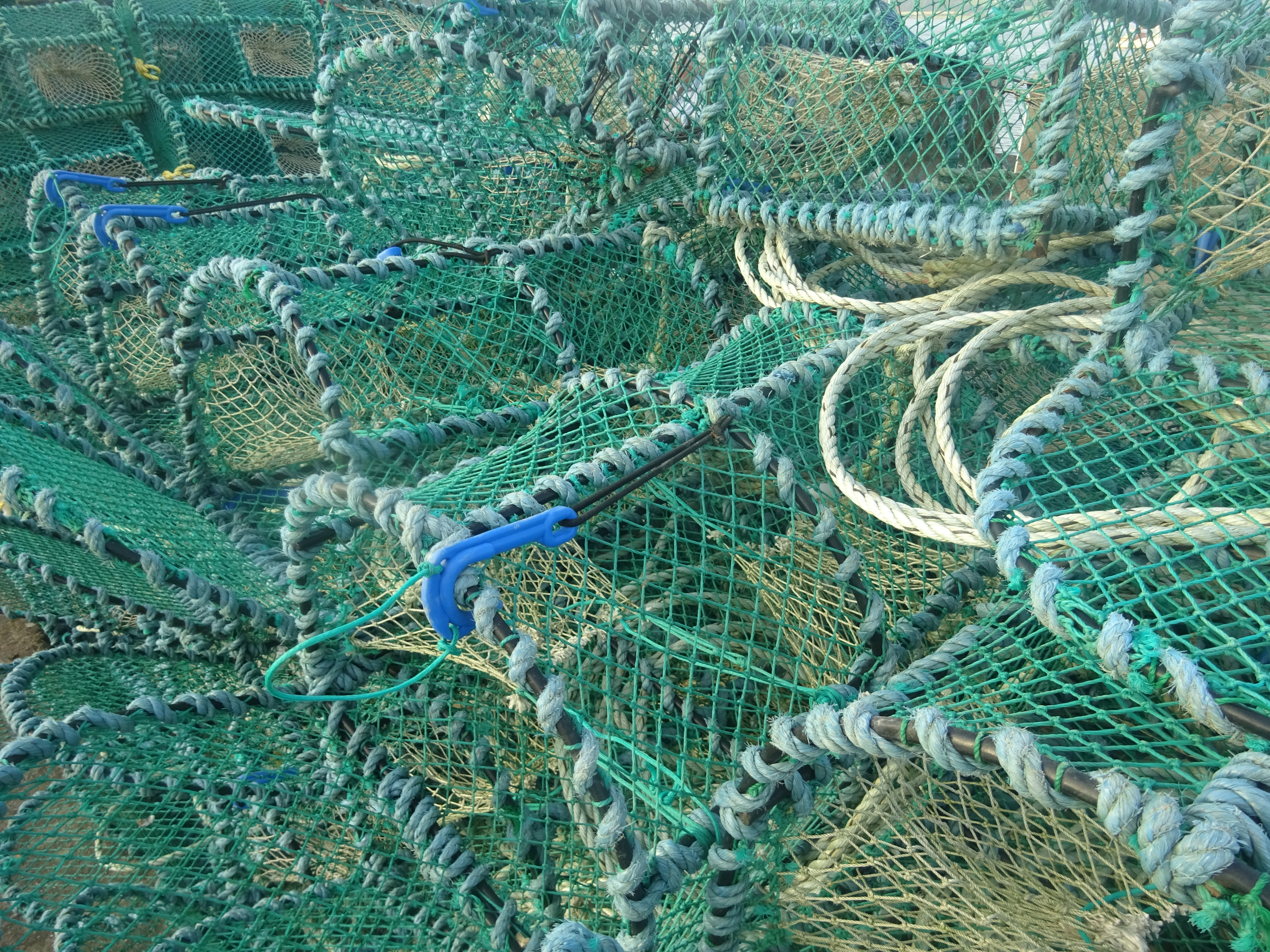
Large pile of lobster pots, Youghal, Ireland

== History ==
Funnels of Maine lobster pots, c. 1899

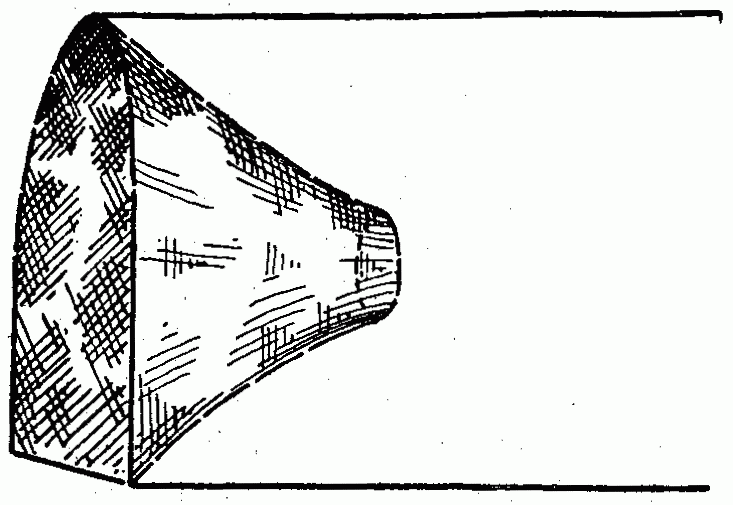
Old-style

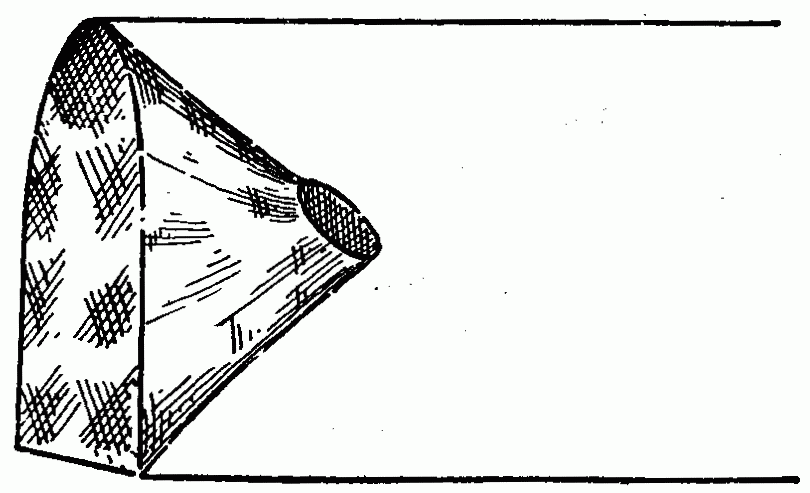
New patent-style

The lobster trap was invented in 1808 by Ebenezer Thorndike of Swampscott, Massachusetts. By 1810, the wooden lath trap is said to have originated in Cape Cod, Massachusetts. New England fishermen in the United States used it for years before American companies introduced it to the Canadian fishery through their Atlantic coast canneries.

An 1899 report by the United States Fish Commission on the Lobster Fishery Of Maine, described the local "lath pots" used by Maine lobster fishers:

The framework of the bottom consists of three strips of wood, either hemlock, spruce, or pine (the first mentioned being the most durable), a little longer than the width of the pot, about 2¾ inches wide, and 1 inch thick. In the ends of each of the outer strips, a hole is bored to receive the ends of a small branch of pliable wood, which is bent into a regular semicircular curve. These hoops are made of branches of spruce or hemlock, or of hardwood saplings, such as maple, birch, or ash, generally retaining the bark. Three of these similar frames, straight below and curved above, constitute the framework of each pot, one to stand at each end and one in the center. The narrow strips of wood, in general, ordinary house laths of spruce or pine, which form the covering, are nailed lengthwise to them, with interspaces between about equal to the width of the lathe. On the bottom, the laths are sometimes nailed on the outside and sometimes on the inside of the cross pieces. The door is formed by three or four of the laths running the entire length near the top. The door is hinged on using small leather strips and is fastened by a single wooden button in the center, or by two buttons, one at each end. The openings into the pot ... are two in number, one at each end, are generally knit of coarse twine, and have a mesh between three-fourths of an inch and 1-inch square. They are funnel-shaped, with one side shorter than the other, and at the larger end have the same diameter as the framework. The smaller inner end measures about 6 inches in diameter and is held open using a wire ring or wooden hoop. The funnels are fastened by the larger ends to the end frames of the pot, with the shorter side uppermost, so that when they are in place they lead obliquely upward into the pot instead of horizontally. The inner ends are secured in position by one or two cords extending to the center frame. The funnels are about 11 or 12 inches deep and therefore extend about halfway to the center of the pot. They taper rapidly and form a strongly inclined plane, up which the lobsters must climb in their search for the bait. A two-strand manila twine is most commonly used for the funnels. Cotton is also used, but is more expensive and less durable.

— John N. Cobb, The Lobster Fishery of Maine

== Safety ==
Lobster fishermen who become entangled in the trap line are at risk of drowning if they are pulled overboard. Best practices have been developed to prevent and reduce entanglement and to facilitate getting fishermen who have fallen overboard back onto their vessels.

== Rope-less lobster traps ==
As whales can get entangled in ropes, there is currently research going on into the development of rope-less lobster traps. Some designs have already been developed.

== See also ==
- Crab trap
- Krusty Krab, a fictional fast food restaurant, styled on the shape of a lobster trap
- Lobster fishing
- Lobster hook
