= Scampi (disambiguation) =

Scampi is a crustacean-based seafood dish.

Scampi may also refer to:

== Seafood ==
- Salt-water species in the lobster (Nephropidae/Homaridae) family of the Astacidea infraorder
  - Nephrops norvegicus, also known as true scampi, Norway lobster, or langoustine
  - Various members of the genus Metanephrops:
    - Metanephrops andamanicus = Metanephrops velutinus, Pacific scampi
    - Metanephrops australiensis, Australian scampi
    - Metanephrops boschmai, Bight scampi (western Australia)
    - Metanephrops challengeri, New Zealand scampi, Pacific scampi
    - Metanephrops sibogae, Melville Island Scampi
    - Metanephrops taiwanicus, Pacific scampi
    - Metanephrops thomsoni, Pacific scampi
- Freshwater species in the shrimp infraorder (Caridea)
  - Macrobrachium rosenbergii, sometimes called freshwater scampi in South Asia.

== People ==
- Scampi, drummer in the Groovie Ghoulies

== Fictional characters ==
- Little Cousin Scampi, a cousin of Sooty seen in The Sooty Show, later Sooty & Co
- The Scampi from Fingerbobs

== Other ==
- Standard CMMI Appraisal Method for Process Improvement
- The flash animation by Jonti Picking
