= M. australiensis =

M. australiensis may refer to:

- Mahella australiensis, a species of bacterium in the phylum Bacillota
- Metanephrops australiensis, Australian scampi, a species of lobster
- Mordellistenoda australiensis, a beetle in the family Mordellidae
