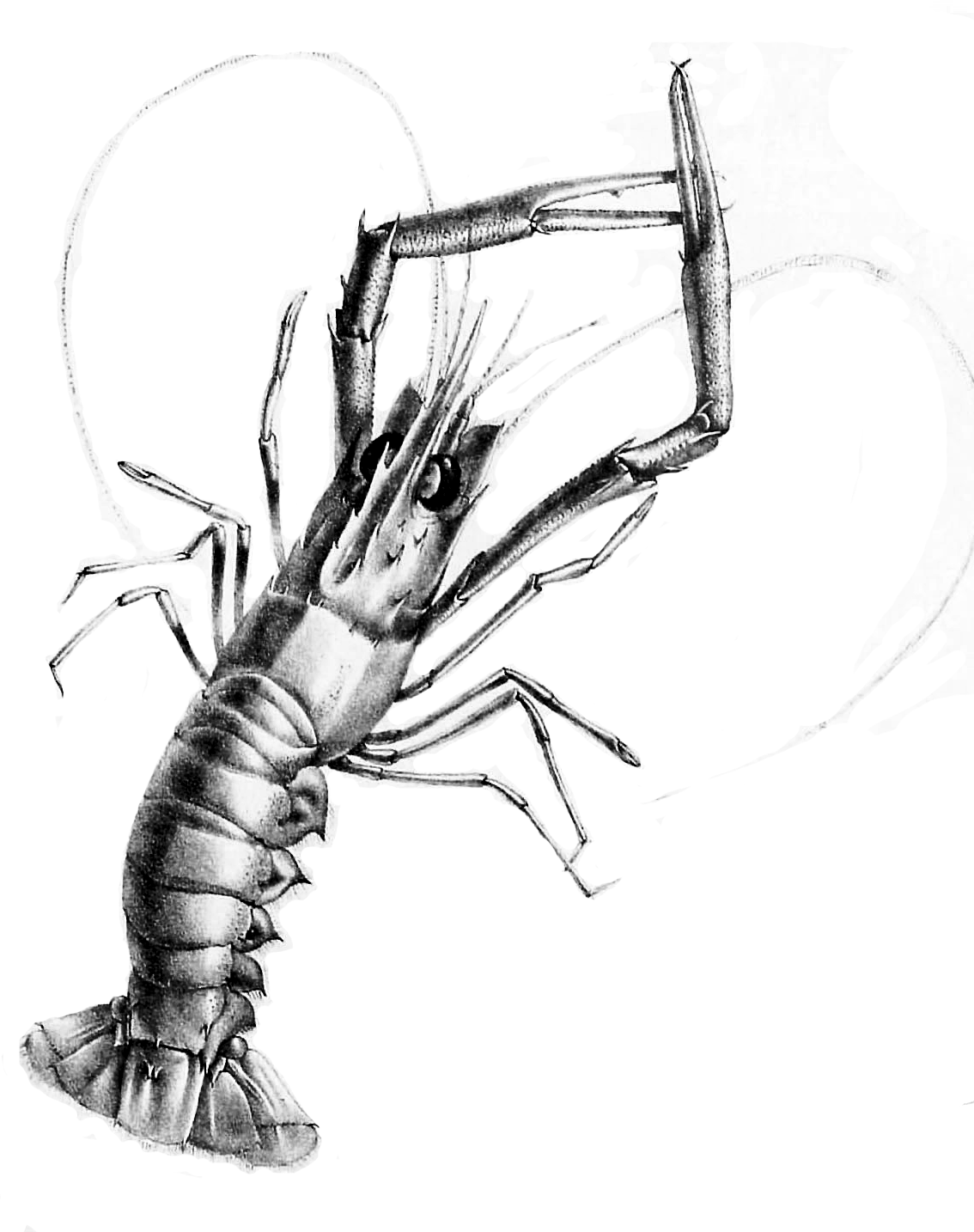
- Illustration by C. Spence Bate (1888)

Conservation status
- Least Concern (IUCN 3.1)

Scientific classification
- Kingdom: Animalia
- Phylum: Arthropoda
- Clade: Pancrustacea
- Class: Malacostraca
- Order: Decapoda
- Suborder: Pleocyemata
- Family: Nephropidae
- Genus: Metanephrops
- Species: M. challengeri

Binomial name
- Metanephrops challengeri (Balss, 1914)

Synonyms
- Nephrops challengeri Balss, 1914

= Metanephrops challengeri =

Species of crustacean

Metanephrops challengeri (commonly known as the New Zealand lobster or New Zealand scampi) is a species of slim, pink lobster that lives around the coast of New Zealand. It is typically 13–18 cm (5–7 in) long and weighs around 100 g (3.5 oz). The carapace and abdomen are smooth, and adults are white with pink and brown markings and a conspicuous pair of long, slim claws. M. challengeri lives in burrows at depths of 140–640 m (460–2,100 ft) in a variety of sediments. Although individuals can live for up to 15 years, the species shows low fecundity, where small numbers of larvae hatch at an advanced stage.

M. challengeri is a significant prey item for ling, as well as being an important fishery species for human consumption; trawlers catch around 1,000 t (2,200,000 lb) per year under the limitations of New Zealand's Quota Management System. In the United States, its acceptable market names are lobsterette, baby lobster, scampi, deep sea lobster, and bay prawn.

The species was first collected by the Challenger expedition of 1872–1876, but only described as separate from related species by Heinrich Balss in 1914. Although originally classified in the genus Nephrops, it was moved in 1972 to a new genus, Metanephrops, along with most other species then classified in Nephrops.

== Description ==
Metanephrops challengeri is a slender lobster, typically 13–18 centimetres (5.1–7.1 in) long, but exceptionally up to 25 cm (9.8 in), and weighing up to 100 grams (3.5 oz) each. Its chelipeds (legs bearing the main chelae, or claws) are long, narrow, and slightly unequal. The second and third pairs of pereiopods also end in small claws, but the fourth and fifth pairs do not. The carapace is smooth, and extends forwards into a long, narrow rostrum, only slightly shorter than the carapace.

Adults are mostly white, but the front half of the rostrum, and the sides of the abdomen, are pink. Bright red bands extend across the base of the rostrum, the posterior edge of the carapace, the chelipeds, and each of the abdominal segments. The dorsal parts of the abdomen are brown, and there are two brown saddles on the dorsal carapace.

M. challengeri is considered to have the most primitive morphology of any species of Metanephrops, having even fewer novelties than the oldest known fossil species, M. rossensis. Its rostrum is longer than that of other species in the thomsoni species group, and the ridge along the midline of the carapace only has two small spines. Unlike some other species of Metanephrops, the carapace is smooth, as are the abdominal tergae, and the chelipeds are covered in fine granules.

== Life cycle ==
Metanephrops challengeri reaches sexual maturity at the age of 3–4 years, and may live up to 15 years in total. Females produce very large eggs in small numbers; they are typically around 2.5 mm (0.1 in) in diameter, and are blue in colour. The larvae hatch at the zoea stage (equivalent to the third zoea of the Northern Hemisphere species Nephrops norvegicus). The zoea larvae are 10.0–11.5 mm (0.39–0.45 in) long, and possess all the appendages of the cephalothorax, including the pereiopods, which are used for swimming, but no pleopods (appendages of the abdomen). This larval stage lasts less than four days, before the young moult into the post-larval stage. The post-larva swims using its pleopods. The post-larva later moults into the adult form. Larvae are rarely seen in the wild, confirming that the development to the bottom-dwelling post-larva is rapid.

== Distribution and ecology ==
Continental shelf areas of New Zealand. Scampi fishing is focused on the Campbell Plateau. The Alpine Fault and the limits of the submerged continent Zealandia are also marked.

Metanephrops challengeri lives around the coasts of New Zealand, including the Chatham Islands, at depths of 140–640 metres (460–2,100 ft). It lives in burrows in a variety of "suitable cohesive" sediments, and is a significant prey item for ling (Genypterus blacodes). Lobsters have few parasites, the most important for M. challengeri being the microsporidian Myospora metanephrops. This can cause "destruction of the skeletal and heart muscles of infected lobsters", but its significance for the animals and for the fishing industry remains unclear. When it was described in 2010, M. metanephrops was the first microsporidian to be isolated from a true lobster.

== Fisheries ==
Metanephrops challengeri has been harvested commercially since the 1980s. Between the season of 1988/89 and 1990/91, the amount of scampi caught around New Zealand increased from only 55,000 kilograms (121,000 lb) to around 500,000 kg (1,100,000 lb). Catch limits were introduced in 1990/91, and now 1,000,000 kg (2,200,000 lb) is caught annually by trawlers. The fishery is centred on four areas of continental shelf of the submerged continent Zealandia: the Campbell Plateau around the Auckland Islands, Chatham Rise, along the Wairarapa coast, and in the Bay of Plenty.

Most of the fishing vessels used to capture M. challengeri are 20–40 metres (66–131 ft) long, with "double or triple trawl rigs of low headline height". There is considerable variation in the catch per unit effort between different depths, between different geographical areas and between different years. M. challengeri is considered a luxury foodstuff. Most of the catch is exported and as a result, it is rarely seen in restaurants in New Zealand.

Metanephrops challengeri was the subject of a 2003 select committee inquiry in the New Zealand parliament, after allegations of corruption arose against officers of the Ministry of Fisheries. Although the allegations were quashed, the inquiry ruled that preferential treatment had been given to the large fishing company Simunovich Fisheries. In response, the government introduced M. challengeri into their Quota Management System and paid compensation to some fishermen who had a justified grievance. Under QMS, an overall limit of 1,291,000 kg (2,846,000 lb) was put in place for M. challengeri in 2011.

== Conservation ==
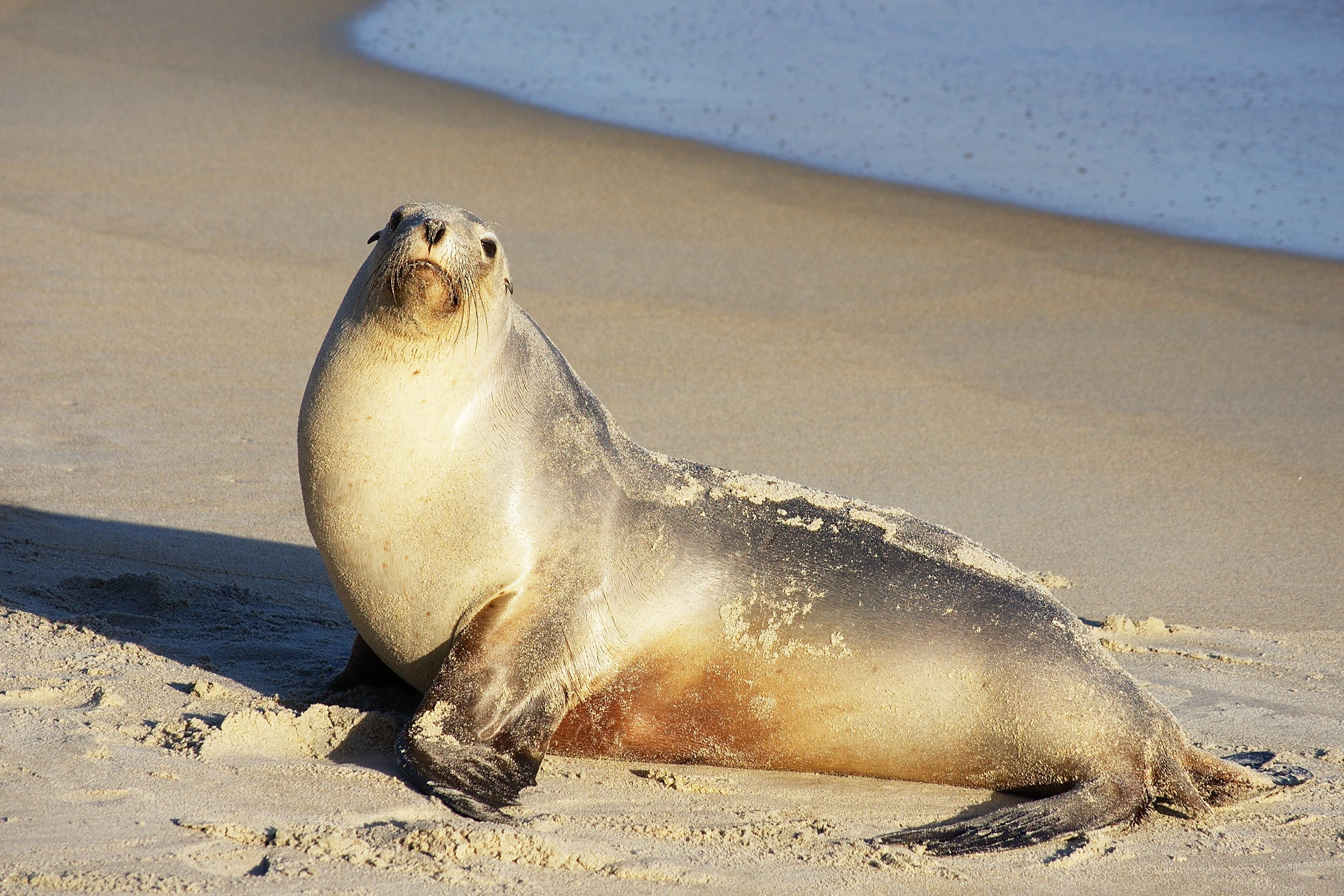
New Zealand sea lions are occasionally caught during the scampi fishery as bycatch.

Metanephrops challengeri is currently listed as Least Concern on the IUCN Red List, due in part to the Quota Management System put in place by the New Zealand government. The species does appear to be declining, however, based both on burrow counts and analyses of catch per unit effort. Estimates of the total population size of M. challengeri vary depending on the methods used. Based on indirect measures, such as burrow counts, there may be as many as 28 million individuals, and the annual catch might represent only 2%–4% of the total population. Using more reliable figures based on those animals seen during surveys, there may be only 2–11 million individuals available to trawlers, and the annual catch may remove 12%–28% of that population. Bycatch from the New Zealand scampi fishery has included the New Zealand sea lion, Phocarctos hookeri, which is considered a vulnerable species by the IUCN.

== Taxonomy ==
Metanephrops challengeri was first described by Heinrich Balss in 1914, under the name Nephrops challengeri. Two specimens had been collected on the Challenger expedition from benthic Globigerina ooze at a depth of 275 fathoms (1,650 ft; 503 m), on the Challenger Plateau in the Tasman Sea (38°50.5′S 169°20′E). They had been included by Charles Spence Bate in his report on the crustaceans collected by the Challenger expedition, but were not separated from "Nephrops thomsoni" (now Metanephrops thomsoni), which was described by Spence Bate as a new species. Balss recognised that Spence Bate's N. thomsoni covered two species and, restricting the name M. thomsoni to the species containing the type specimens designated by Spence Bate (from the Philippines), created a new species for the species from New Zealand. Balss chose the two specimens seen by Spence Bate to be the type specimens of his new species, Nephrops challengeri. Both were females, and they have been deposited at the Natural History Museum in London.

The species was transferred to a new genus, Metanephrops (along with every other extant species then in Nephrops, except its type species, Nephrops norvegicus) by Richard Jenkins of the University of Adelaide in 1972. Jenkins placed M. challengeri among the "thomsoni group" within the genus Metanephrops, alongside M. thomsoni, M. sibogae, M. boschmai and M. sinensis. Jenkins inferred that this group of species had originated off northern Australia or in Indonesia, and that M. challengeri had reached New Zealand in the late Tertiary and displaced M. motunauensis, which formerly lived there. More recently, findings from molecular phylogenetics suggest that M. challengeri has a basal position in the genus, possibly linked to M. neptunus, and that the genus may have originated at high latitudes in the South Atlantic.
