= M. japonicus =

M. japonicus may refer to:

- Mallotus japonicus, a plant species found in Japan
- Marsupenaeus japonicus, the kuruma shrimp or kuruma prawn, a crustacean species
- Metanephrops japonicus, a lobster species found in Japanese waters
