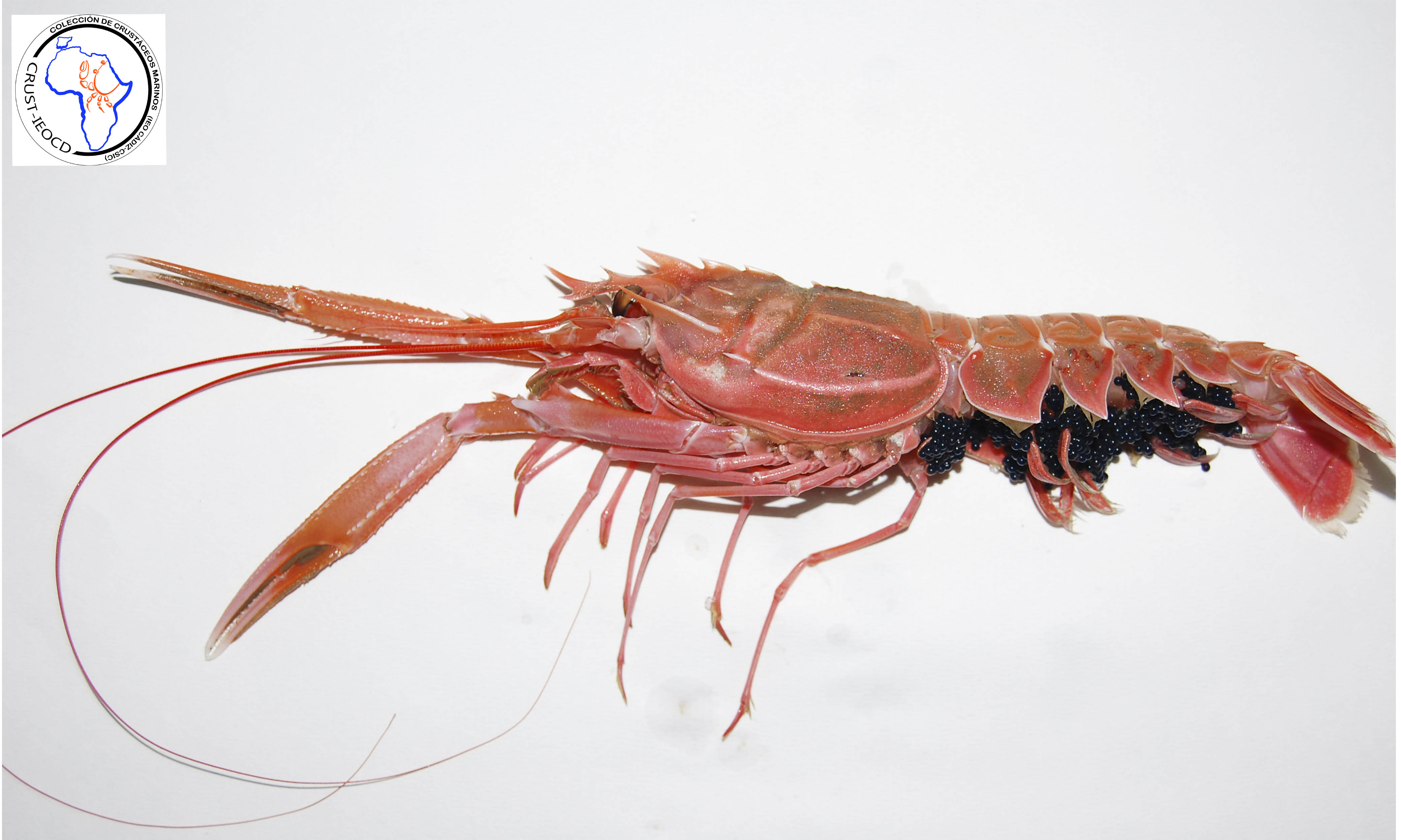

Conservation status
- Least Concern (IUCN 3.1)

Scientific classification
- Kingdom: Animalia
- Phylum: Arthropoda
- Class: Malacostraca
- Order: Decapoda
- Suborder: Pleocyemata
- Family: Nephropidae
- Genus: Metanephrops
- Species: M. mozambicus

Binomial name
- Metanephrops mozambicus Macpherson, 1990

= Metanephrops mozambicus =

Species of lobster

Metanephrops mozambicus (commonly known as the African lobster) is a species of lobster that lives around south-east of Madagascar. Previously considered to be part of the species Metanephrops andamanicus (Andaman lobster), they were re-classified as a unique species in 1990. The species is commercially trawled.
