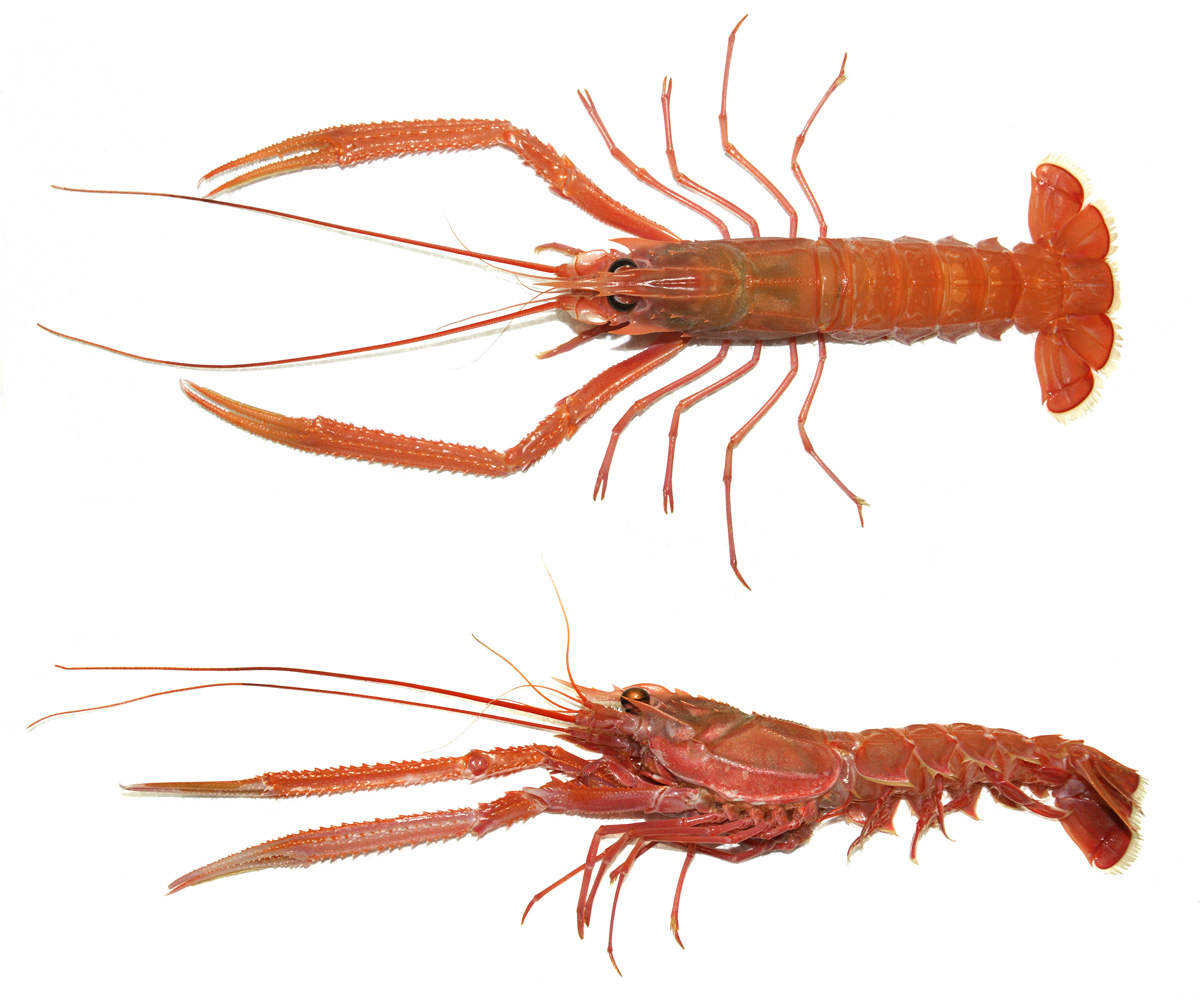
- Metanephrops japonicus

Scientific classification
- Kingdom: Animalia
- Phylum: Arthropoda
- Clade: Pancrustacea
- Class: Malacostraca
- Order: Decapoda
- Suborder: Pleocyemata
- Family: Nephropidae
- Genus: Metanephrops; Jenkins, 1972

Type species
- Nephrops japonicus Tapparone-Canefri, 1873

Species
- see Text

= Metanephrops =

Metanephrops Temporal range: Late Cretaceous–Recent

Genus of lobsters

Metanephrops is a genus of lobsters, commonly known as scampi. Important species for fishery include Metanephrops australiensis (Australian scampi) and Metanephrops challengeri (New Zealand scampi). It differs from other lobsters such as Homarus and Nephrops norvegicus in that its two main claws are of equal size, rather than being differentiated into a crusher and a pincher. There are 18 extant species recognised in the genus:

== Species ==
Species with taxonomic authority and common name:

- Metanephrops andamanicus (Wood-Mason, 1891) — Andaman lobster
- Metanephrops arafurensis (De Man, 1905) — Arafura lobster
- Metanephrops armatus Chan & Yu, 1991 — Armoured lobster
- Metanephrops australiensis (Bruce, 1966) — Northwest lobster
- Metanephrops binghami (Boone, 1927) — Caribbean lobster
- Metanephrops boschmai (Holthuis, 1964) — Bight lobster
- Metanephrops challengeri (Balss, 1914) — New Zealand lobster
- Metanephrops formosanus Chan & Yu, 1987 — Formosa lobster
- Metanephrops japonicus (Tapparone-Canefri, 1873) — Japanese lobster
- Metanephrops mozambicus Macpherson, 1990 — African lobster
- Metanephrops neptunus (Bruce, 1965) — Neptune lobster
- Metanephrops rubellus (Moreira, 1903) — Urugavian lobster
- Metanephrops sagamiensis (Parisi, 1917) — Sculpted lobster
- Metanephrops sibogae (De Man, 1916) — Siboga lobster
- Metanephrops sinensis (Bruce, 1966) — China lobster
- Metanephrops taiwanicus (Hu, 1983) —
- Metanephrops thomsoni (Bate, 1888) — Red-banded lobster
- Metanephrops velutinus Chan & Yu, 1991 — Velvet lobster

A further three species are known from fossils:

- Metanephrops jenkinsi Feldmann, 1989 – Late Cretaceous
- Metanephrops motunauensis Jenkins, 1972 – Pliocene
- Metanephrops rossensis Feldmann et al., 1993 – Late Cretaceous

== Habitat ==
Metanephrops inhabit burrows located in sticky soft substrate that they build themselves. They typically live at depths ranging between 50 and 994m below the surface of the ocean, but are found in greater abundances at 150m or deeper. This classifies them as a "deep sea lobster" since they inhabit a region below 50m under the surface of the ocean. Occurrences of Metanephrops are prevalent on the west side of ocean basins, especially the Indo-West-Pacific, ranging from latitudes of 35^{∘}N to 50^{∘}S. Only two of the extant species of Metanephrops inhabit the western basin of the Atlantic Ocean. M. binghami resides in the Gulf of Mexico and around the Caribbean and Cuba; while M. rubellus resides off of the southern coast of Brazil and off the coast of Uruguay.

== Diet ==
Metanephrops are scavengers like most lobsters. They consume a diet largely consisting of the corpses of pelagic and benthic species that have fallen to the sea floor. Specific examples of their typical diet include small marine organisms such as plankton and parasites, ghost shark (Hydrolagus novaezealandiae), silver warehou (Seriolella punctata), tall sea pen (Funiculina quadrangularis) and the salp (Ihlea racovitzai).

== Reproduction ==
The unique reproductive habits of Metanephrops are poorly understood due to the difficulty of getting individuals of Metanephrops to mate in captivity. However, their mating habits appear to follow that of most genera of lobster, with copulation occurring after a female moults. Successful instances of copulation were observed to occur when the male was larger and stronger than the female and was able to turn the female over and pin her down in order for copulation to occur. In one study, viable eggs were produced 3 days following an instance where sperm uptake was successful after copulation. However, the eggs did not hatch for another 222 days, meaning that the total time from spawning to hatch was 225 days.

== Development and morphology ==
Metanephrops begin their lives in a platonic larval stage that must undergo several cycles of molting to reach maturity. During these molting phases, some postlarval aspects of a mature Metanephrops become apparent with each subsequent molt. The Metanephrops larva is a zoea larva shared by many other crustaceans, and the time spent in this state is approximately 4–8 days. Before entering the zoea stage of larval development, newly hatched instances of Metanephrops are surrounded by a cuticle that encompass all appendages, though this stage lacks armed process on the first and second antenna and telson. This stage, like the zoea larval stage, is also typical in decopods. This pre-zoea stage is extremely short lived in individuals that will proceed to enter the zoea larval stage, lasting for only a few minutes to a few hours. Upon entering the zoea larval stage individuals of Metanephrops are typically 10-15mm long and bear notably well developed eyes that are stalked with small cornea. The zoea larva of Metanephrops are semi-opaque, but a system of red/orange chromatophores create a visible spot on the abdomen. After the zoea larval stage, Metanephrops enter a juvenile post larval stage characterized by the presence of all adult characteristics. This is especially apparent in the transferring of locomotion to the abdominal by use of pleopods to walk like other genera of lobsters, as opposed to primary locomotion being swimming as in the larval stage. However, it is likely that they retain some ability to swim through their pleopods and uropods.

== Origin ==
Metanephrops first appeared in the fossils record in the late Cretaceous. Specimens were found on the eastern side of the Antarctic peninsula. Stratigraphic, geographic and cladistic evidence suggest that Metanephrops developed in high southern latitudes.

== Fishing ==
Certain species of Metanephrops, such as Metanephrops challengeri, support commercial fisheries on and off the continental shelf and slope of New Zealand. Scampi make burrows in muddy substrates, and fisheries use a number of methods such as photographic and burrow analysis methods to determine scampi emergence patterns in order to assess catchability. This data suggests that roughly half of all scampi burrows are occupied at any given time. Scampi have been targeted by trawl fisheries since the late 1980s. At that time landings were between 800 and 1000 tons per year for the species Metanephrops challengeri. Since then landings for M. challengeri have fallen to between 600 and 800 tons per year in recent years.
