= Mordellistenoda melana =

Scientific classification
- Kingdom: Animalia
- Phylum: Arthropoda
- Class: Insecta
- Order: Coleoptera
- Suborder: Polyphaga
- Infraorder: Cucujiformia
- Family: Mordellidae
- Subfamily: Mordellinae
- Tribe: Mordellistenini
- Genus: Mordellistenoda
- Species: M. melana

Binomial name
- Mordellistenoda melana Fan & Yang, 1995

Synonyms
- Asiatolida melana Shiyake, 2000

Species of beetle

Mordellistenoda melana is a beetle in the genus Mordellistenoda of the family Mordellidae. It was described in 1995 by Fan & Yang.
