= Mordellistenoda donan =

Scientific classification
- Kingdom: Animalia
- Phylum: Arthropoda
- Class: Insecta
- Order: Coleoptera
- Suborder: Polyphaga
- Infraorder: Cucujiformia
- Family: Mordellidae
- Subfamily: Mordellinae
- Tribe: Mordellistenini
- Genus: Mordellistenoda
- Species: M. donan

Binomial name
- Mordellistenoda donan Tsuru, 2004

Species of beetle

Mordellistenoda donan is a beetle in the genus Mordellistenoda of the family Mordellidae. It was described in 2004 by Tsuru.

It has been found in the Yonaguni and Ishigaki Islands.
