= Scampi =

Seafood dish and style of preparation

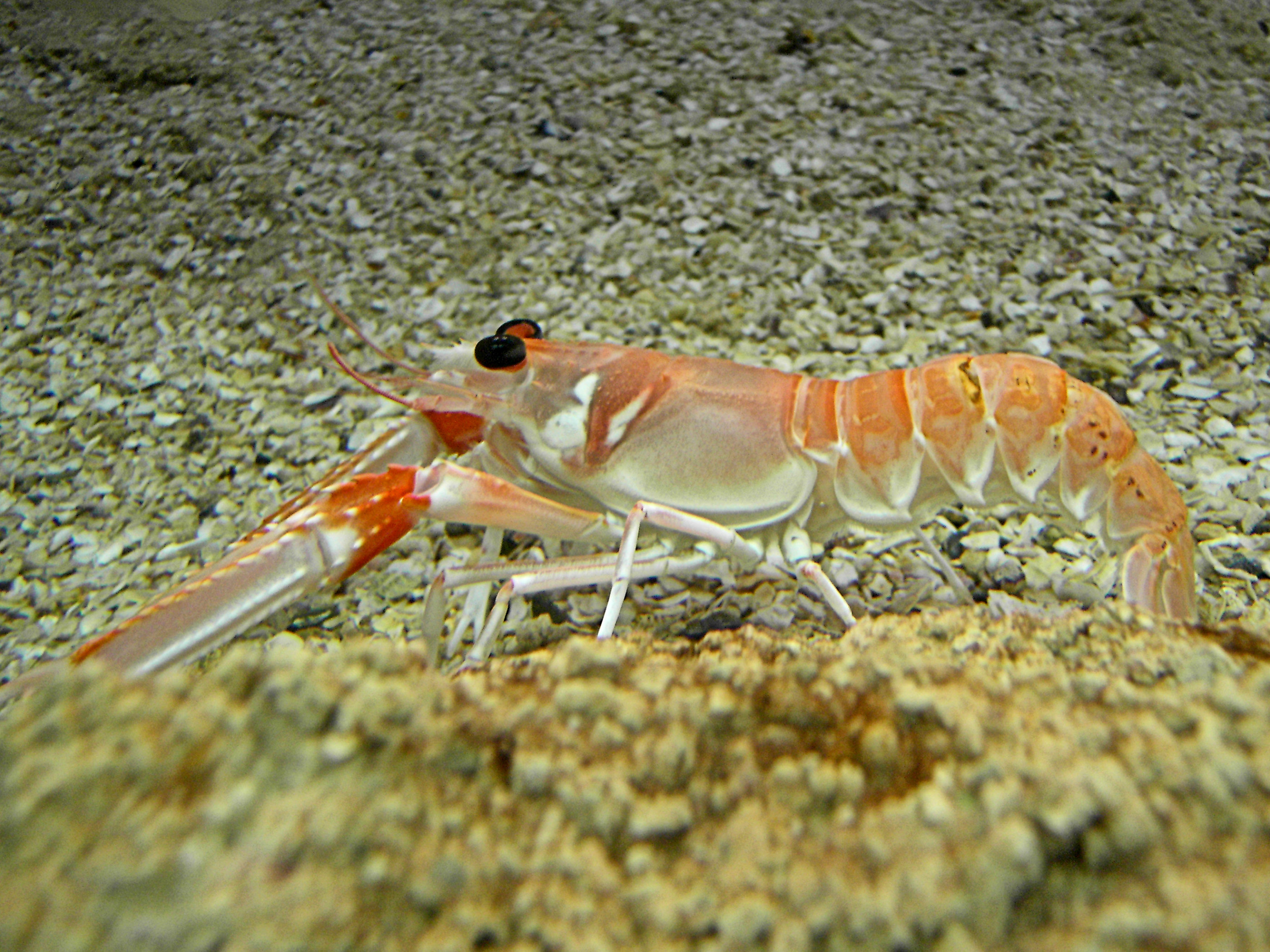
Nephrops norvegicus, the langoustine

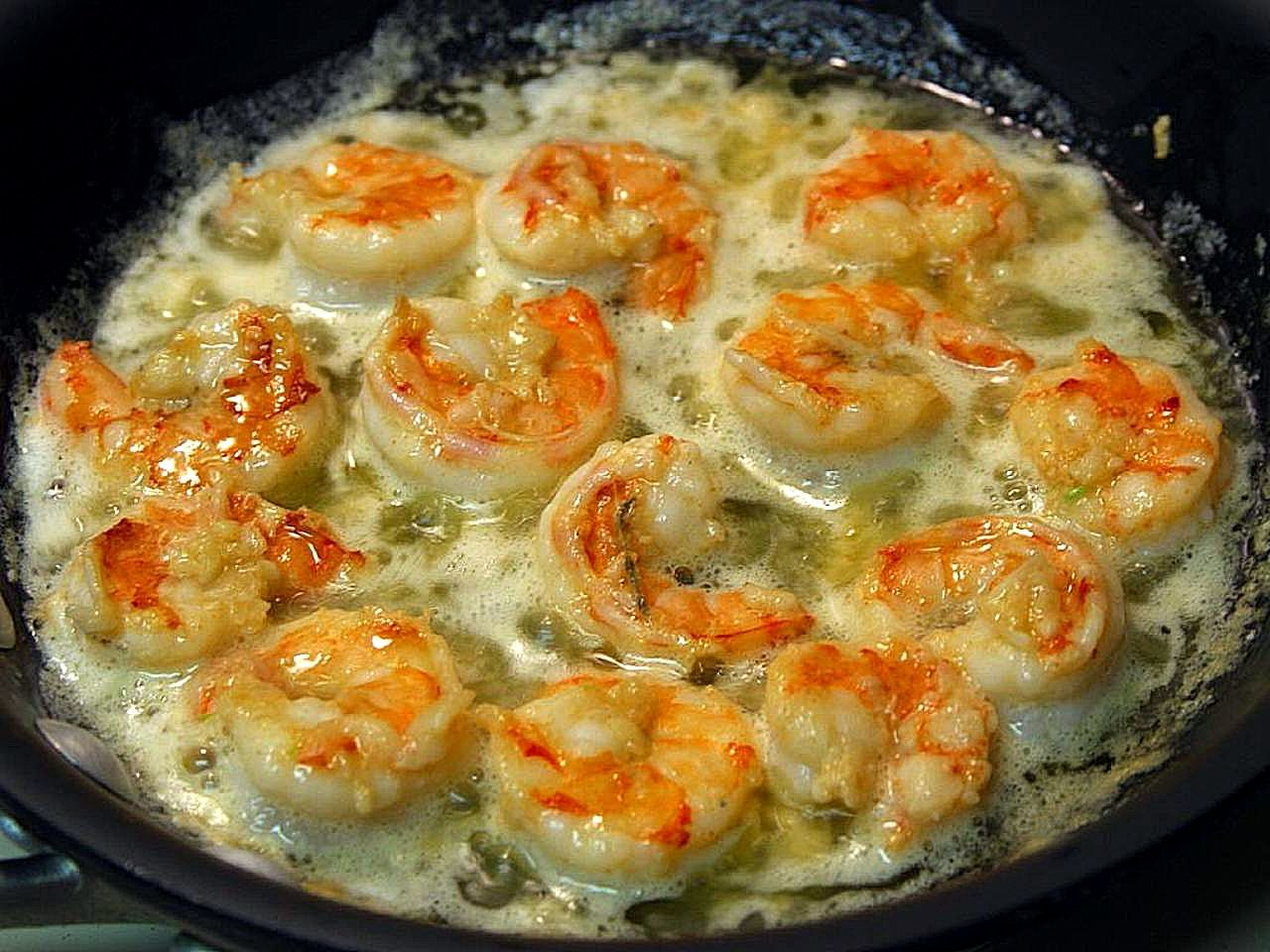
Scampi served

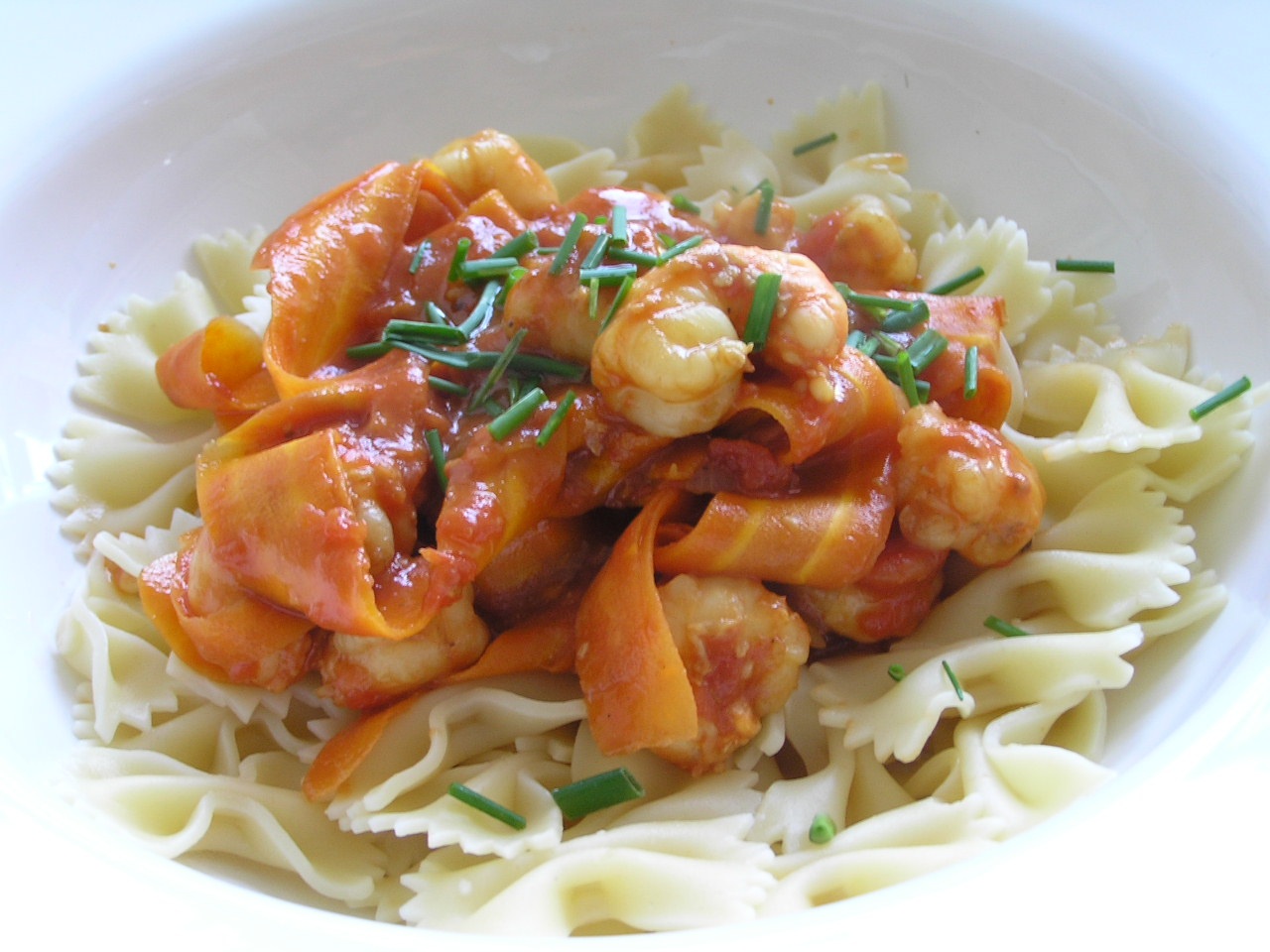
Scampi in picante tomato sauce

Scampi is a crustacean-based seafood dish, typically featuring langoustine, prawns or shrimp sautéed in olive oil, garlic, and white wine, and garnished with Parmesan cheese and lemon juice, though exact ingredients vary regionally in preparation. The term "scampi" comes from the Italian name for langoustines, which were the original shellfish used in the dish.

== Name ==
Scampi is the plural of scampo, the Italian name for the langoustine (Nephrops norvegicus), also called the Norwegian lobster. The Italian word may be derived from the Ancient Greek καμπή (kampḗ), meaning "bending" or "winding".

In English, the term may, depending on region and context, refer to either langoustine as a species, or to the dish traditionally made with them or a similar crustacean. In the United States, where langoustines are uncommon, the dish is made with shrimp, and usually called "shrimp scampi", treating the term as a style of preparation. Food labelling laws in the UK require products labelled "scampi" to contain langoustine or, as "Pacific scampi", Andaman lobster (Metanephrops andamanicus) or New Zealand lobster (Metanephrops challengeri); monkfish tail was formerly sometimes dishonestly used and sold as scampi in the United Kingdom.

== Preparation methods ==
Although commonly sautéed, as in Italy, the French encyclopaedia Larousse Gastronomique describes langoustine as delicate, and suggests they be poached only for a few seconds in court-bouillon. When very fresh, they have a slightly sweet flavor that is lost when frozen and can be eaten plain.

In Britain, the shelled tail meat is generally referred to as "scampi tails" or "wholetail scampi". Cheaper "re-formed scampi" can contain other parts pressed together with other fish. Scampi is served fried in batter or breadcrumbs and usually with chips and tartar sauce. It is widely available in supermarkets and restaurants and considered pub food.

In the United States, "shrimp scampi" is the menu name for a particular shrimp dish in Italian-American cuisine. (The actual word for "shrimp" in Italian is gambero or gamberetto, plural gamberi or gamberetti.) "Scampi" by itself is a dish of shrimp served in garlic butter, dry white wine and Parmesan cheese, either with bread or over pasta or rice. The term "shrimp scampi" is construed as a style of preparation, with variants using other shellfish or even meats such as chicken.

== See also ==
- List of seafood dishes
