= Mordellistenoda ismayi =

Scientific classification
- Domain: Eukaryota
- Kingdom: Animalia
- Phylum: Arthropoda
- Class: Insecta
- Order: Coleoptera
- Suborder: Polyphaga
- Infraorder: Cucujiformia
- Family: Mordellidae
- Subfamily: Mordellinae
- Tribe: Mordellistenini
- Genus: Mordellistenoda
- Species: M. ismayi

Binomial name
- Mordellistenoda ismayi Batten, 1990

Species of beetle

Mordellistenoda ismayi is a beetle in the genus Mordellistenoda of the family Mordellidae. It was described in 1990 by Batten.
