= Buckland-in-the-Moor =

Village and civil parish in Devon, England

Coordinates: 50°32′37″N 3°48′22″W

Buckland in the Moor is a village and civil parish in the Teignbridge district of Devon, England. According to the 2001 census it had a population of 94. The village is in Dartmoor.

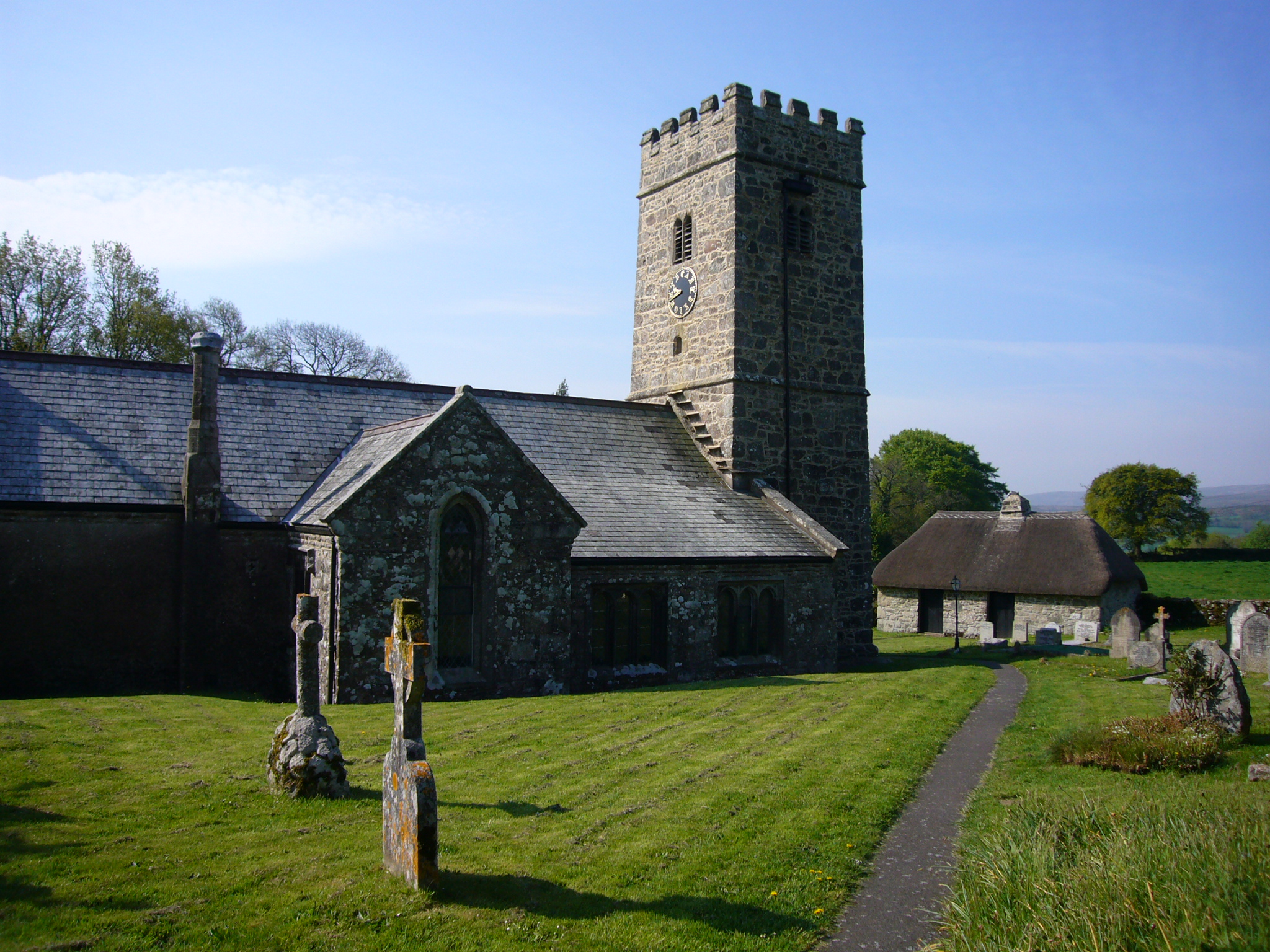
The church, showing the famous clock.

According to Elias Tozer (1825–1873) a ritual until recently had been observed in the village of Buckland-in-the-Moor on Midsummer Day in which the youth of the village would sacrifice a sheep on the block of granite and sprinkle themselves with the blood. He could not find what the significance of the ritual was, but says it was thought to have pre-Christian Celtic origins.

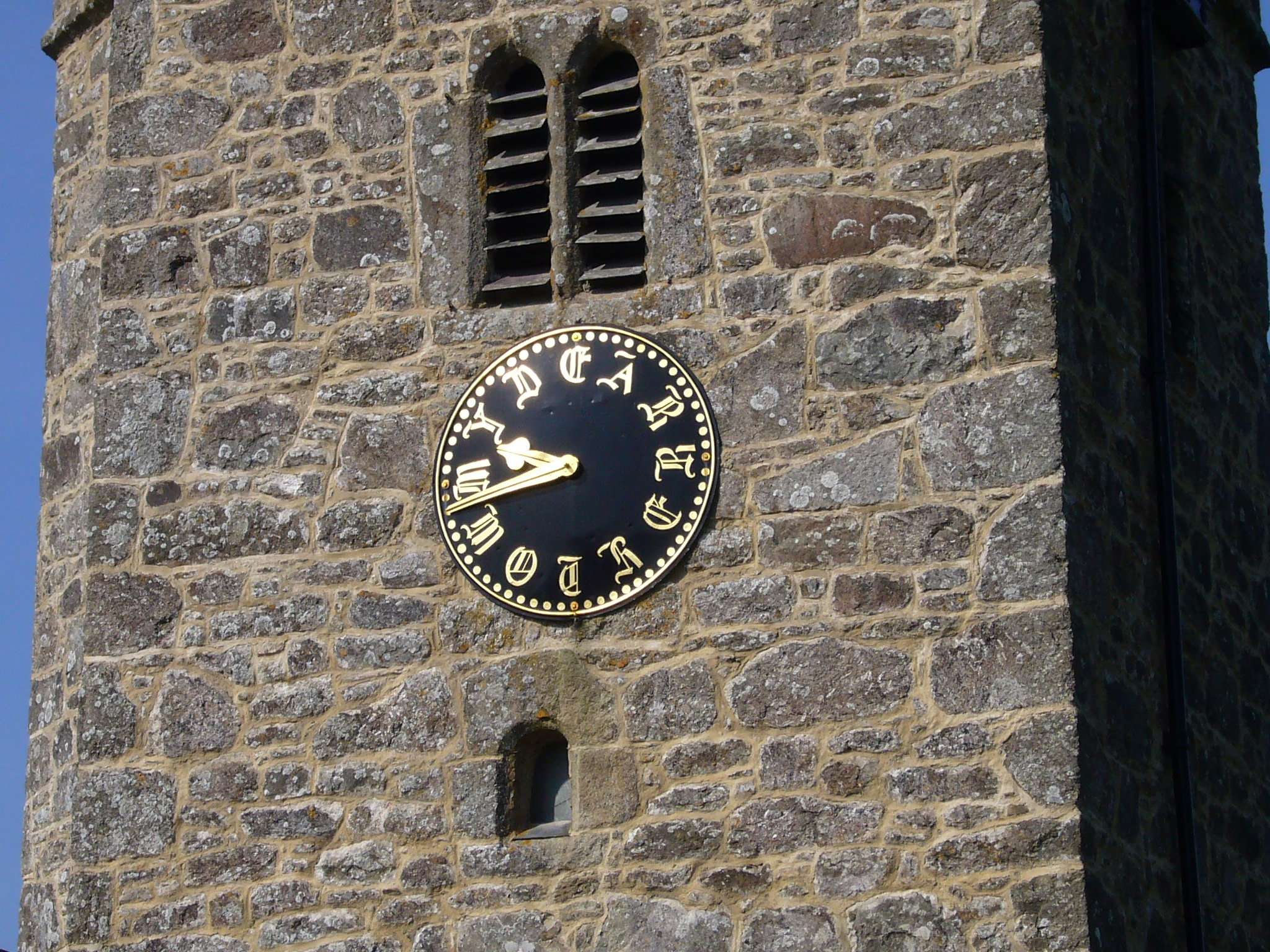
Detail of the clock face.

The church is made of stone quarried on the moor. The face of the clock spells out "My Dear Mother". The baptismal font is Norman, and decorated with leaves and stars. Nearby is a viewpoint called Buckland Beacon, where the Ten Commandment Stones can be found (1282 ft).

In 1927 the Lord of Buckland Manor, Mr Whitley, learnt that parliament had rejected a proposed revision of the Book of Common Prayer using Jesus' Two Commandments instead of Moses' Ten, at Holy Communion.

He celebrated by engaging Mr W A Clements, a stonemason from Exeter, to engrave granite stones in situ on Buckland Beacon with the Ten Commandments. He started work on 15 December 1927 and completed the job on 14 June 1928. Whilst engraving the stones he lived in a cow shed on the site and was supplied each week with a loaf of bread by Mr Whitley.

In later years Mr Clements said, "Day after day I was on my knees chipping away and I wondered if the originator of the Commandments suffered from an aching back and sore knees as I did". A glance at the stones reveals eleven commandments, the eleventh inscribed, "A new commandment I give unto you, that ye love one another. John 13 v34."

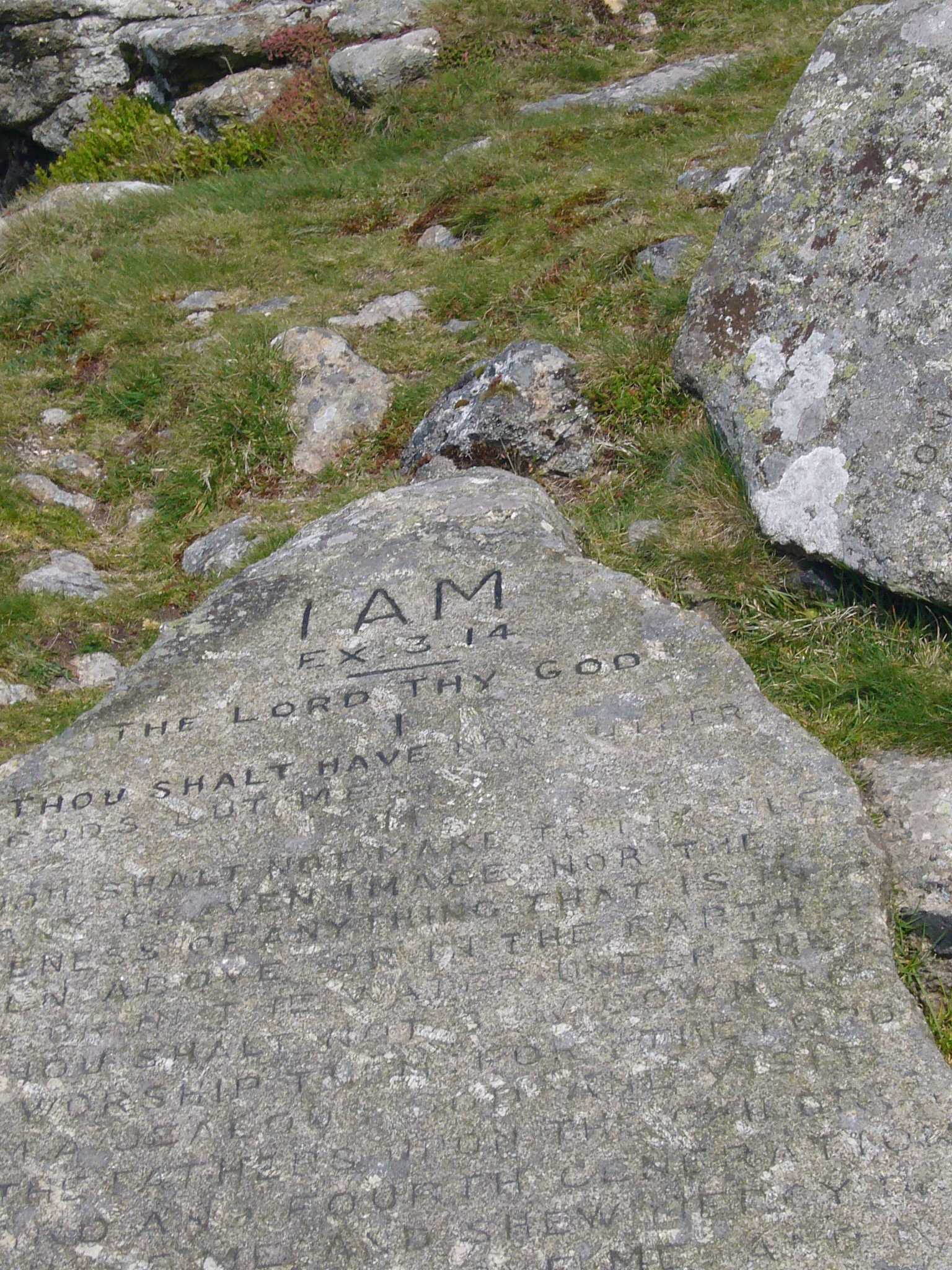
Detail of one of the "commandment" stones
