= Mordellistenoda ohsumiana =

Scientific classification
- Domain: Eukaryota
- Kingdom: Animalia
- Phylum: Arthropoda
- Class: Insecta
- Order: Coleoptera
- Suborder: Polyphaga
- Infraorder: Cucujiformia
- Family: Mordellidae
- Subfamily: Mordellinae
- Tribe: Mordellistenini
- Genus: Mordellistenoda
- Species: M. ohsumiana

Binomial name
- Mordellistenoda ohsumiana (Nakane, 1957)

Synonyms
- Glipostenoda ohsumiana Nakane, 1957; Falsomordellina ohsumiana Nomura, 1966; Mordellistenoda ohsumiana Nomura, 1963

Species of beetle

Mordellistenoda ohsumiana is a species of beetle in the genus Mordellistenoda of the family Mordellidae. It was described in 1957.
