= Cosdon Hill =

Hill on Dartmoor in Devon, England

- Cosdon Beacon, Cawsand Beacon
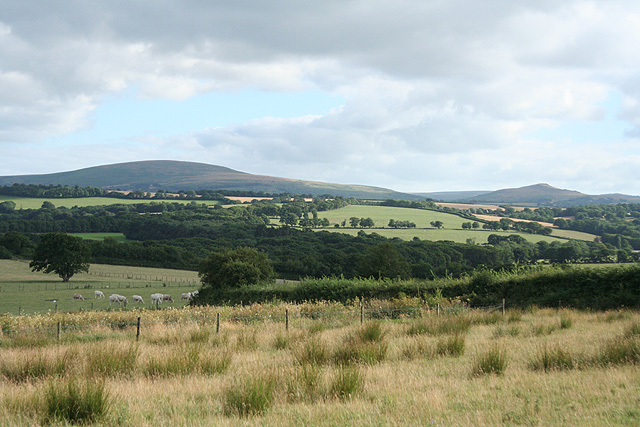
- Looking south-south-west from Sampford Courtenay towards Dartmoor with Cosdon Hill prominent on the left

Highest point
- Elevation: 550 m (1,800 ft)
- Parent peak: High Willhays
- Coordinates: 50°42′25″N 3°55′59″W

Geography
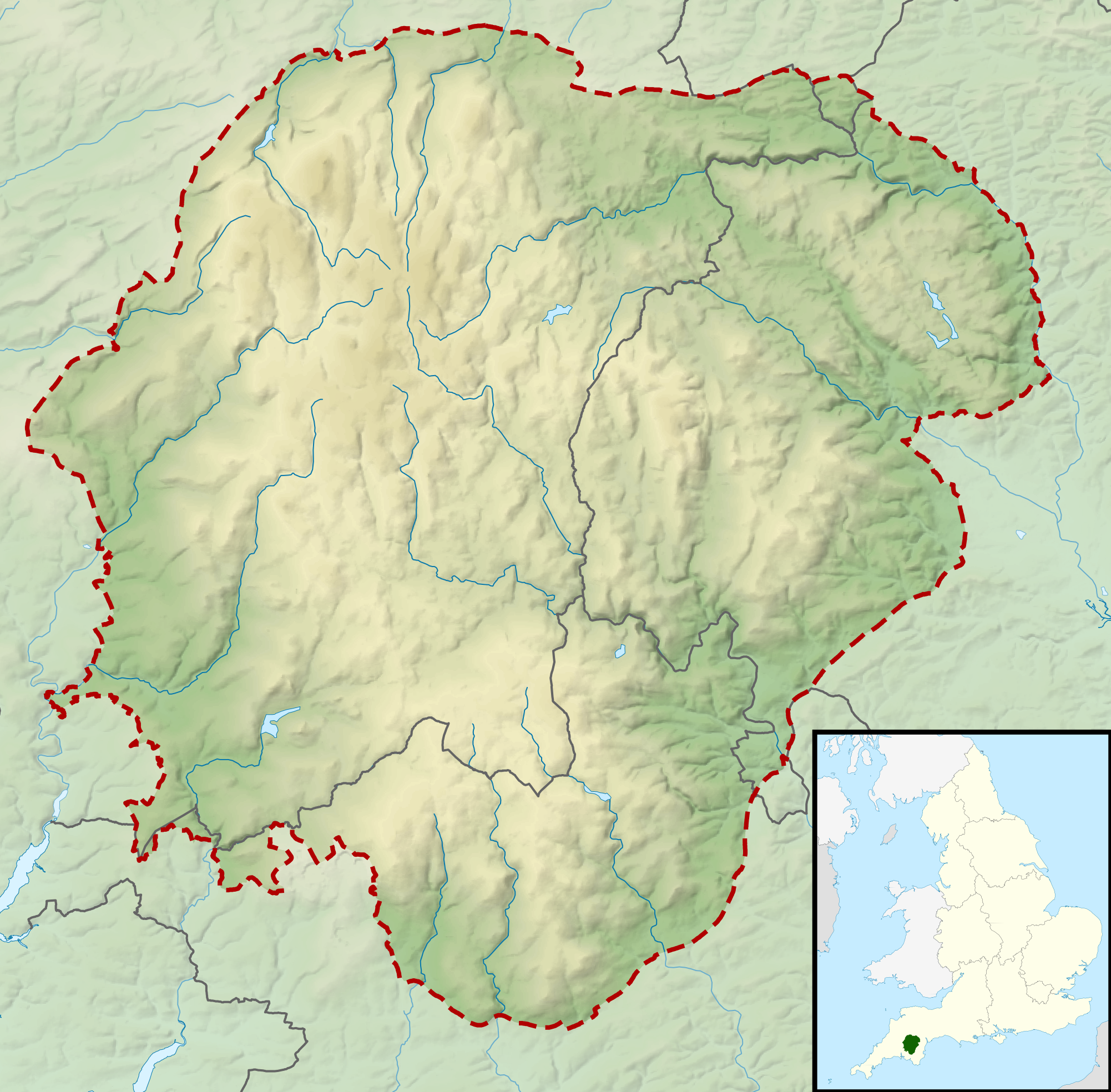
- Location within Dartmoor
- Location: Dartmoor, England
- Parent range: Dartmoor

Cosdon Hill, also called Cosdon Beacon, or Cawsand Beacon, is one of the highest hills on Dartmoor, in Devon, England. It has numerous traces of prehistoric occupation.

== Description ==
Cosdon (Note: Cosdon hill is also given as Cawson hill or Cosson hill in 19th century sources.) is a large, rounded hill that rises to 550 metres (1,800 ft). The first written record of the hill is to the Hoga de Cossdonne in 1240. The name Cossdonne seems to mean "Cost(a)'s hill", where "Cost" or "Costa" is the name of a person.

The shape of the hill gives a false impression of size, and for many years Cosdon was thought to be the highest on Dartmoor. The surveyors of the Principal Triangulation of Great Britain took bearings that resulted in the first Ordnance Survey map of Dartmoor in 1809, which showed that Yes Tor was higher. However, in 1830 Samuel Rowe still wrote that Cawson or Cosdon hill was the highest in Dartmoor. An 1894 guide for cyclists going from Exeter to Launceston said, "So vast is the bulk of Cosdon that, were is not for the cloud mists that so often drift round his brow, one would hardly at first sight credit his height of 1799 feet."

From the summit of Cosdon it is often possible to see the English Channel from Teignmouth to Start Point, and on a clear day the Bristol Channel may be visible. The hill provides an excellent view over Dartmoor. As Thomas Clifton Paris wrote in 1865, "Far and wide stretch its desolate hills, the ancient haunt of wolves and wild deer, and barbarians as untamed; a solitary wondrous region, everywhere darkened by morasses, but piled with fantastic rocks and glowing with innumerable tints."

== History ==
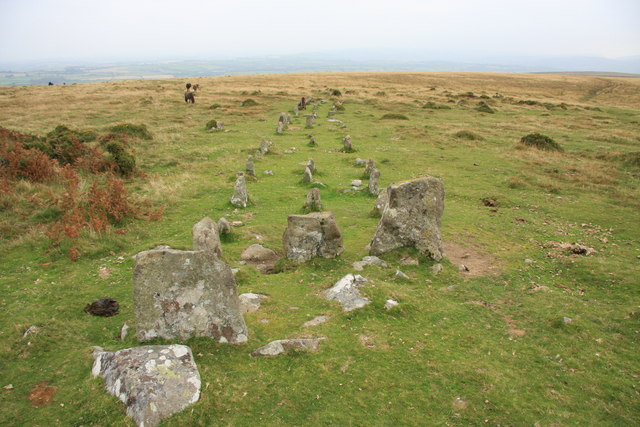
Triple stone row on North Tawton Common

A Neolithic flint axe has been found at the western foot of the hill. There were nine Bronze Age settlements around the western edge of the hill and two associated reaves, or stone walls, that may have marked the boundaries between territories. There are also many stone cairns, kistvaens, stone rows and what may be a stone circle. Some of these have been badly damaged by stones being removed later for other uses. There is a very large cairn on the summit, which may well have been the site of a beacon.

An 1896 report described three parallel lines of stones, starting from a cairn surrounded by a circle, on the North Tawton Common on the east side of Cosdon. The report noted that a wall was being built around a large slice of the common, and masons had been working for several years breaking up and removing stones for the wall. There were signs that an inner circle was buried in the cairn. Two kistvaens were found within the cairn. One was intact but the coverer and two side stones had been taken from the other.

Dartmoor was called a forest in 1238. It was granted by Henry III of England to his brother, Richard, Earl of Cornwall and Poictou, in 1248. The extent of the Forest of Dartmoor was verified by the solemn oath of twelve Perambulators. The commissioners began their perambulation at Cosdon Hill in the north quarter of Dartmoor, then followed a circuit of the moor, returning to the starting point at Cosdon. Samuel Rowe (1793–1853), Vicar of Crediton, noted in 1848 that they started at a point near the foot of the hill called Hoga de Cosdowne, and said this must have been near the banks of the Taw close to Sticklepath. Arthur B. Prowse wrote in 1892 that the starting point must have simply been the summit of the hill.

In the 1840s an adit was driven into the hill, and lodes of mispickel and copper ore were found. The shaft of the Ivy Tor Copper mine was sunk in 1851, and the mine continued to be worked for several years. By 1867 Ivy Tor had been united with Copper Hill to form Belstone Consoles, on the river Tavy. The mispickel at Ivy Tor contained bismuth. Actinolite and feldspar were also found at Ivy Tor. For some time the hill was a shooting moor for grouse and occasional deer. Some granite shooting butts can still be seen on the north and east of the hill. There is a trig point, Flush Bracket Number S5362, on the summit of the hill, from which a wide area of country can be viewed.

== On Cawsand Beacon ==
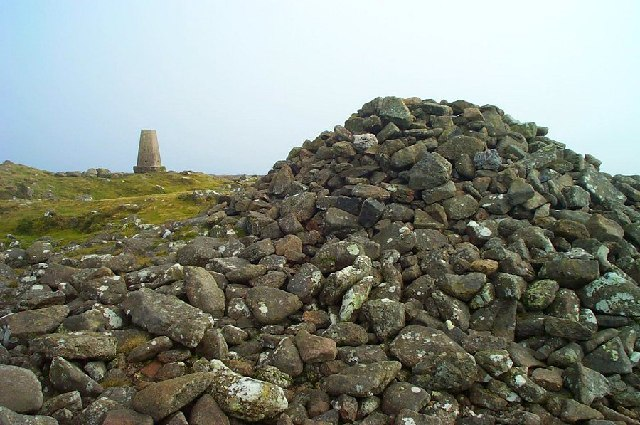
Cairn and triangulation point on the summit

Elias Tozer (1825–73) wrote,

Rolling o’er the purple heather,
In the glorious Summer weather,
Staining lips with whortleberries,
Sweet as any figs or cherries.

Sipping from the crystal stream,
Lying on the banks to dream,
Watching skylarks soar above
Singing, with them, strains of love.

Gazing over boundless plain,
List’ning to the sweet refrain
Of the rivulets and rills
As they flow by distant hills;

Hearing voices, strange and low,
Mystic tones that come and go,
Seeing tors salute each other,
Every one a friend and brother.

== Sources ==
- Baring-Gould, S.; Burnard, Robert; Rowe, J. Brooking; Pode, J. Duke; Worth, R. Hansford (July 1896), "Third Report of the Dartmoor Exploration Committee", Report & Transactions of the Devonshire Association, vol. 28
- Carrington, Nicholas Toms (1826), Dartmoor, a descriptive poem, with notes by W. Burt
- "Cosdon Beacon", Legendary Dartmoor
- "Exeter to Launceston: Route 321", C.T.C. Gazette: The Official Organ of the Cyclists' Touring Club, Cyclists Touring Club., 1894
- Ormerod, G. Wareing (1867), "Notes on the Carboniferous Beds Adjoining the Northern Edge of the Granite of Dartmoor", Report & Transactions
- Paris, Thomas Clifton (1865), A hand-book for travellers in Devon & Cornwall [by T.C. Paris].
- Parker, Joanne (20 November 2014), Britannia Obscura: Mapping Hidden Britain, Random House, ISBN 978-1-4735-1347-1
- Prowse, Arthur B. (1892), "The Bounds of the Forest of Dartmoor", Report & Transactions, Devonshire Association for the Advancement of Science, Literature and Art
- Rowe, Samuel (1830), "Antiquarian Investigations in the Forest of Dartmoor, Devon", Transactions, Plymouth athenaeum
- Rowe, Samuel (1848), A perambulation of the antient & royal forest of Dartmoor, and the Venville precincts
