= Samuel Rowe (antiquary) =

- Born: 11 November 1793; Brixton, Devon, England
- Died: 15 September 1853 (aged 59); Crediton, Devon, England
- Occupations: Vicar, antiquarian
- Known for: Perambulation of Dartmoor

Samuel Rowe (11 November 1793 – 15 September 1853) was a farmer's son who became a bookseller, vicar and antiquarian of Devon, England. He is known for his Perambulation of Dartmoor, which for many years was the standard work on the prehistoric and later sites to be found on the moor.

== Life ==
Samuel Rowe was born on 11 November 1793, second son of Benjamin Rowe, freeholding farmer of Sherford Barton, Brixton, Devon, and Mary Avent of St Budeaux, Devon. The Rowe family had lived at Brixton for several generations. He attended the nearby Plympton Grammar School.

Rowe had "ever an insuperable distaste for agricultural pursuits." The family thought of sending him to Oxford to study for entry into the Church of England. Instead he was made apprentice to a Kingsbridge, Devon, bookseller in 1810. In 1813 his father bought him an old-established bookshop in Plymouth, where his younger brother Joshua Brookng Rowe (father of the antiquarian Joshua Brooking Rowe) soon joined him. He devoted his free time to study and writing.

Rowe became a close friend of Thomas Byrth (1793–1849), an avid if untutored reader and scholar. In 1814 they launched the Plymouth Literary Magazine and undertook an antiquarian tour of Cornwall. They published six issues of the magazine, the last appearing on 19 November 1814. Also in 1814 they established a boarding school in Plympton, which was also short-lived. In 1817 Rowe joined the Plymouth Athenaeum, which was called "the centre of all literary, scientific and artistic life in South Devon." In 1821 he became the secretary of the Athenaeum.

Rowe was a churchwarden under the evangelical Rev. John Hatchard at St. Andrew's, Plymouth, in the early 1820s. He matriculated at Jesus College, Cambridge in 1822, graduated B.A. in 1826 and M.A. in 1833. In 1824 he was ordained as a curate at St. Andrews under Hatchard. He was presented to the incumbency of St. Budeaux, and in 1832 became the first minister of a new church of St. Paul at Stonehouse, Plymouth. He was then transferred to the vacant incumbency of St. George, the older church of Stonehouse: these preferments were all in the gift of Hatchard. In 1835 Rowe was elected vicar of Crediton, Devonshire, out of seventy candidates.

Samuel Rowe died at Crediton on 15 September 1853, and was buried in the churchyard. By his 1829 marriage to Sydney, daughter of Adam Neale, he left a son and five daughters.

== Work ==
Rowe published a tourist guide to Plymouth in 1821. He also published epitomes of William Paley's Philosophy and Evidences, and several religious books and tracts. In 1830 Rowe published an article on Antiquarian Investigations in the Forest of Dartmoor, Devon in the Transactions of the Plymouth Athenaeum. In it he incorrectly stated that Cosdon Hill was the highest summit in Dartmoor. (Note: The surveyors of the Principal Triangulation of Great Britain took bearings that resulted in the first Ordnance Survey map of Dartmoor in 1809, which showed that Yes Tor was higher than Cosdon Hill.) He published an 8 volume book on Gothic architecture in 1844.

Rowe published A Perambulation of Dartmoor in 1848 as a result of fieldwork carried out in 1827–28. The book is dedicated to Albert, Prince of Wales. It described and listed all the known ancient monuments on Dartmoor, with many picturesque illustrations. The book became recognised as the standard account of Dartmoor. It presents and compares the views of earlier antiquarians. For example, it discusses the Drewsteignton cromlech (Spinsters' Rock) in some detail and gives views on the possibility that it was a Druid monument expressed by writers including Borlase, Chapple and Polwhele. Rowe thought the cromlech (dolmen) was primarily a sepulchre, but thought it was possibly also an altar where the Druids made sacrifices.

The Perambulation was reprinted in 1856. It was thoroughly revised by his nephew, J. Brooking Rowe, and published in 1895 with much new material added, and with many illustrations by the Devon artist Frederick John Widgery. The new edition has a portrait of Rowe. The changing views of antiquarians through the 19th century are well illustrated in the revised edition. For example, different opinions are given on the origin of Grimspound,

Polwhele states that it was a seat of judicature for the Cantred of Darius; Samuel Rowe, that it was a Belgic or Saxon camp; Ormerod considered it a cattle-pound pure and simple; Spence Bate was convinced that it was nothing more than a habitation of tinners and of no great age; while now the work of the Rev S. Baring-Gould and Mr Robert Burnard goes far to show that its construction reaches back into a remote past, and that its antiquity is greater than any former investigator dared to assign to it."

== Publications ==
- Rowe, Samuel (1819), Iskander, or the Hero of Epirus, by Arthur Spenser, London. 3 volumes
- Rowe, Samuel (1821), The Panorama of Plymouth; or, Tourist's Guide to the Principal objects of Interest in the Towns and Vicinity of Plymouth, Dock, and Stonehouse, Plymouth
- Rowe, Samuel (1828), An Epitome of Paley's Evidences of Christianity, Baldwin and Cradock
- Rowe, Samuel (1830), "Antiquarian Investigations in the Forest of Dartmoor, Devon", Transactions, Plymouth athenaeum
- Rowe, Samuel (1834), The Church Psalm Book: a Selection from the Old, New, and Other Versions, with Hymns for the Principal Festivals and Other Occasions (2 ed.), Rowe
- Rowe, Samuel (1841), An Appeal to the Rubric, in a review of the several clauses of the Ritual Code. With suggestions for general uniformity in the public services of the United Church of England and Ireland
- Rowe, Samuel (1844), Gothic Architecture, its Decline and Revival, London
- Rowe, Samuel (1848), A perambulation of the antient & royal forest of Dartmoor, and the Venville precincts

== Sources ==
- Courtney, William Prideaux (1886), "Byrth, Thomas, D.D.", Dictionary of National Biography, vol. 8, London: Smith, Elder, & Co.
- Goodwin, Gordon (1897), "ROWE, SAMUEL (1793-1853)", Dictionary of national biography, vol. 49, London: Smith, Elder & Co.
- Northcote, Lady Rosalind (2013), Moorland, stream coast: a vision of Devon, Callendar Press, ISBN 978-1-291-57038-0
- Parker, Joanne (20 November 2014), Britannia Obscura: Mapping Hidden Britain, Random House, ISBN 978-1-4735-1347-1
- Rowe, Samuel; Rowe, J. Brooking (1985), A Perambulation Of Dartmoor: A Facsimile Of The 1896 Edition Including Fold-Out Maps (3 ed.), Exeter, Devon: Devon Books/A. Wheaton & Co.Ltd., ISBN 0861147731
- Samuel Rowe (PDF), Devon County Council, archived from the original (PDF) on 15 September 2016
- Stunt, Timothy C. F. (31 August 2015), The Elusive Quest of the Spiritual Malcontent: Some Early Nineteenth-Century Ecclesiastical Mavericks, Wipf and Stock Publishers, ISBN 978-1-4982-0931-1
