= Mordellistenoda =

Scientific classification
- Kingdom: Animalia
- Phylum: Arthropoda
- Class: Insecta
- Order: Coleoptera
- Suborder: Polyphaga
- Infraorder: Cucujiformia
- Family: Mordellidae
- Subfamily: Mordellinae
- Tribe: Mordellistenini
- Genus: Mordellistenoda; Ermisch, 1941

Type species
- Mordellistenoda fuukiensis Ermisch, 1941

Genus of beetles

Mordellistenoda is a genus of beetles in the family Mordellidae, containing the following species:

- Mordellistenoda atrilimbata Shiyake, 1997
- Mordellistenoda australiensis Ermisch, 1963
- Mordellistenoda donan Tsuru, 2004
- Mordellistenoda fukiensis Ermisch, 1941
- Mordellistenoda ismayi Batten, 1990
- Mordellistenoda melana Fan & Yang, 1995
- Mordellistenoda memnonia Shiyake, 1997
- Mordellistenoda nigricans Shiyake, 1997
- Mordellistenoda notialis Shiyake, 1997
- Mordellistenoda ohsumiana Nakane, 1957
- Mordellistenoda trapezoides Batten, 1990
