= Elias Tozer =

English journalist and poet (1825-1873)

- Born: 21 November 1825; Exeter, Devon, England
- Died: 13 December 1873 (aged 48)
- Occupation: Journalist

Elias Tozer (21 November 1825 – 13 December 1873) was a Devon journalist, poet and collector of folk stories.

== Life ==
Elias Tozer was born on 21 November 1825 in Exeter. (Note: Another source gives his place of birth as Ivybridge, to the east of Exeter.) For many years he was a reporter for the Western Times, an Exeter paper. Later he bought the newspaper Chambers' Exeter Journal. His paper was merged into the Devon Weekly Times, and Tozer became joint owner of this newspaper. Elias Tozer died on 13 December 1873.

== Work ==
Tozer wrote many articles on Devonshire country life, and delighted in reproducing dialect. For example, he wrote of a visit to the village of Drewsteignton when the bells were being rung, " 'They be often ringing, sir,' observed an old man to me; and he continued: 'The ringers be vurry fond of the bells, and sometimes they ring vor vurry little. T'other day Varmer Dadd killed a peg, and gied the natlins to the poor of the parish. Darned if the ringers didden ring vor a whole hour, as they zed, to cillebrate the hayvent.' " Tozer could write in a more serious vein. Thus he describes a ritual that until recently had been observed in the village of Buckland-in-the-Moor on Midsummer Day in which the youth of the village would sacrifice a sheep on the block of granite and sprinkle themselves with the blood. He could not find what the significance of the ritual was, but says it was thought to have pre-Christian Celtic origins.

Tozer's Devonshire & Other Original Poems, originally published in 1873 under the nom-de-plume of "Tickler", was very popular. Most of the poems had been published in the Devon Weekly Times or the Evening Express. A dialect poem entitled "Satan's visit to North Lew as told by Ma Granfer" begins:

The devil he cum to our parish wan day,
But he zed he didden intend vor to stay;
He was gwain on varther to vetch a vat Prior,
The layder of Tavistock's vair Abbey quire,
Who'd a been a behavin as no Prior shude do,
And he'd vix'd to make un a vine brimstone stew.

Some poems were in standard English, thus On Cawsand Beacon celebrates the famous Dartmoor hill as,

Rolling o’er the purple heather,
In the glorious Summer weather,
Staining lips with whortleberries,
Sweet as any figs or cherries.

Sipping from the crystal stream,
Lying on the banks to dream,
Watching skylarks soar above
Singing, with them, strains of love.

Gazing over boundless plain,
List’ning to the sweet refrain
Of the rivulets and rills
As they flow by distant hills;

Hearing voices, strange and low,
Mystic tones that come and go,
Seeing tors salute each other,
Every one a friend and brother.

== Publications ==
- Tozer, Elias (1869), Devonshire Sketches: Dartmoor and its Borders
- Tozer, Elias (1871), Devonshire sketches, including pixie lore, ..., Exeter: Devon Weekly Times Office
- Tozer, Elias (1873), Devonshire & Other Original Poems: With Some Account of Ancient Customs, Superstitions, and Traditions, Printed and published at the office of the Devon Weekly Times

== Sources ==
- "Cosdon Beacon", Legendary Dartmoor, archived from the original on 2016-08-26
- Page, John Lloyd Warden (1892), An Exploration of Dartmoor and Its Antiquities: With Some Accounts of Its Borders, Seeley and Company, Limited
- Reilly, Catherine (2000), Mid-Victorian Poetry, 1860-1879, A&C Black, ISBN 978-0-7201-2318-0
- Worth, Richard Nicholls (1875), The West Country Garland: Selected from the Writings of the Poets of Devon and Cornwall, from the Fifteenth to the Nineteenth Century, with Folk Songs and Traditional Verses, Houlson & sons
- Wright, W. H. K. (1896), West-Country Poets: Their Lives and Works, London: Elliot Stock
