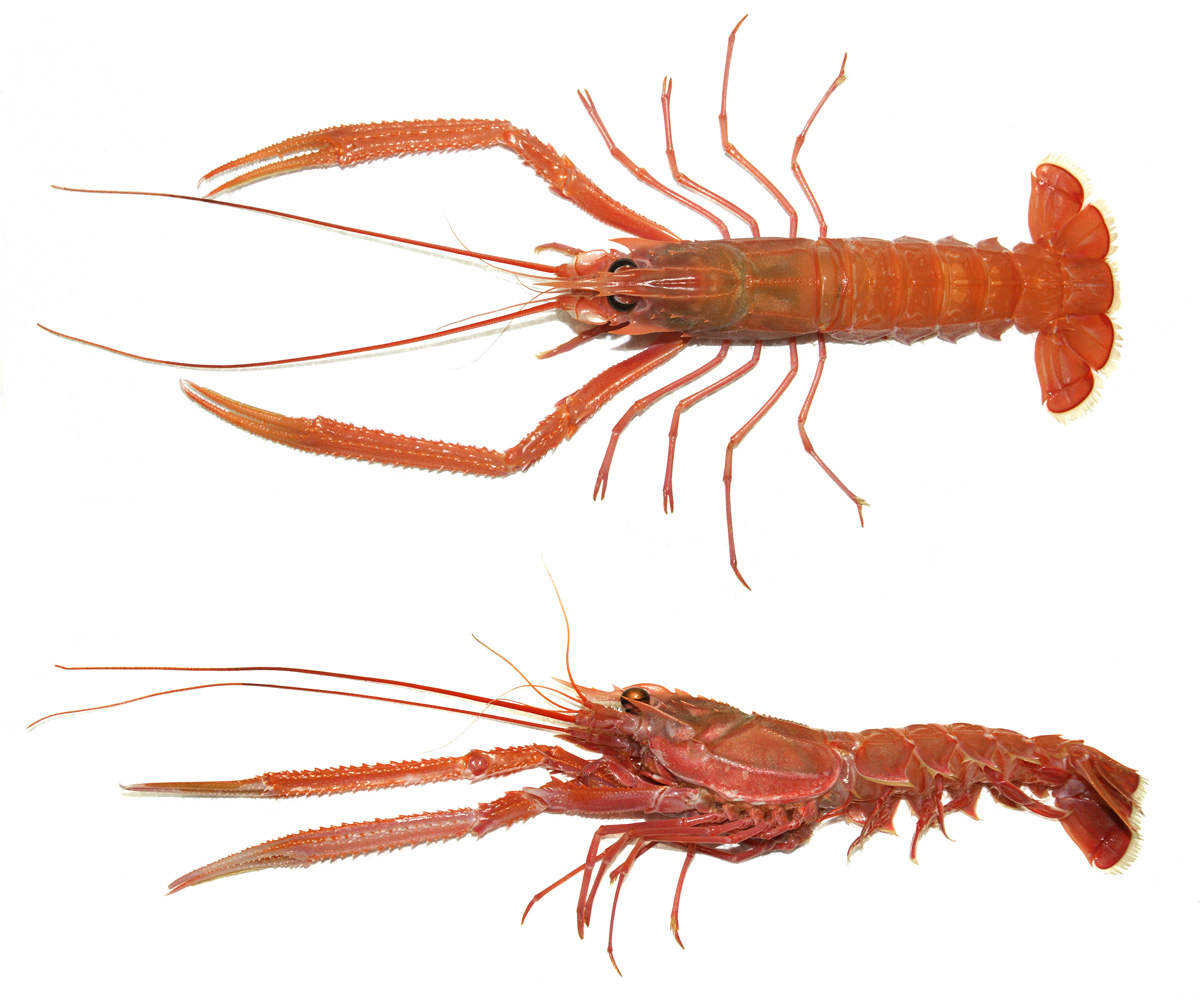

Conservation status
- Data Deficient (IUCN 3.1)

Scientific classification
- Kingdom: Animalia
- Phylum: Arthropoda
- Class: Malacostraca
- Order: Decapoda
- Suborder: Pleocyemata
- Family: Nephropidae
- Genus: Metanephrops
- Species: M. japonicus

Binomial name
- Metanephrops japonicus (Tapparone-Canefri, 1873)

Synonyms
- Nephrops japonicus Tapparone-Canefri, 1873

= Metanephrops japonicus =

Species of lobster

Metanephrops japonicus is a species of lobster found in Japanese waters, and a gourmet food in Japanese cuisine. It occurs from Chōshi, Chiba Prefecture (Honshu) to the east coast of Kyushu, where it lives at depths of 200–440 metres (660–1,440 ft). Adults grow to a total length of 9–12 centimetres (3.5–4.7 in), and a carapace length of 3–7 cm (1.2–2.8 in).

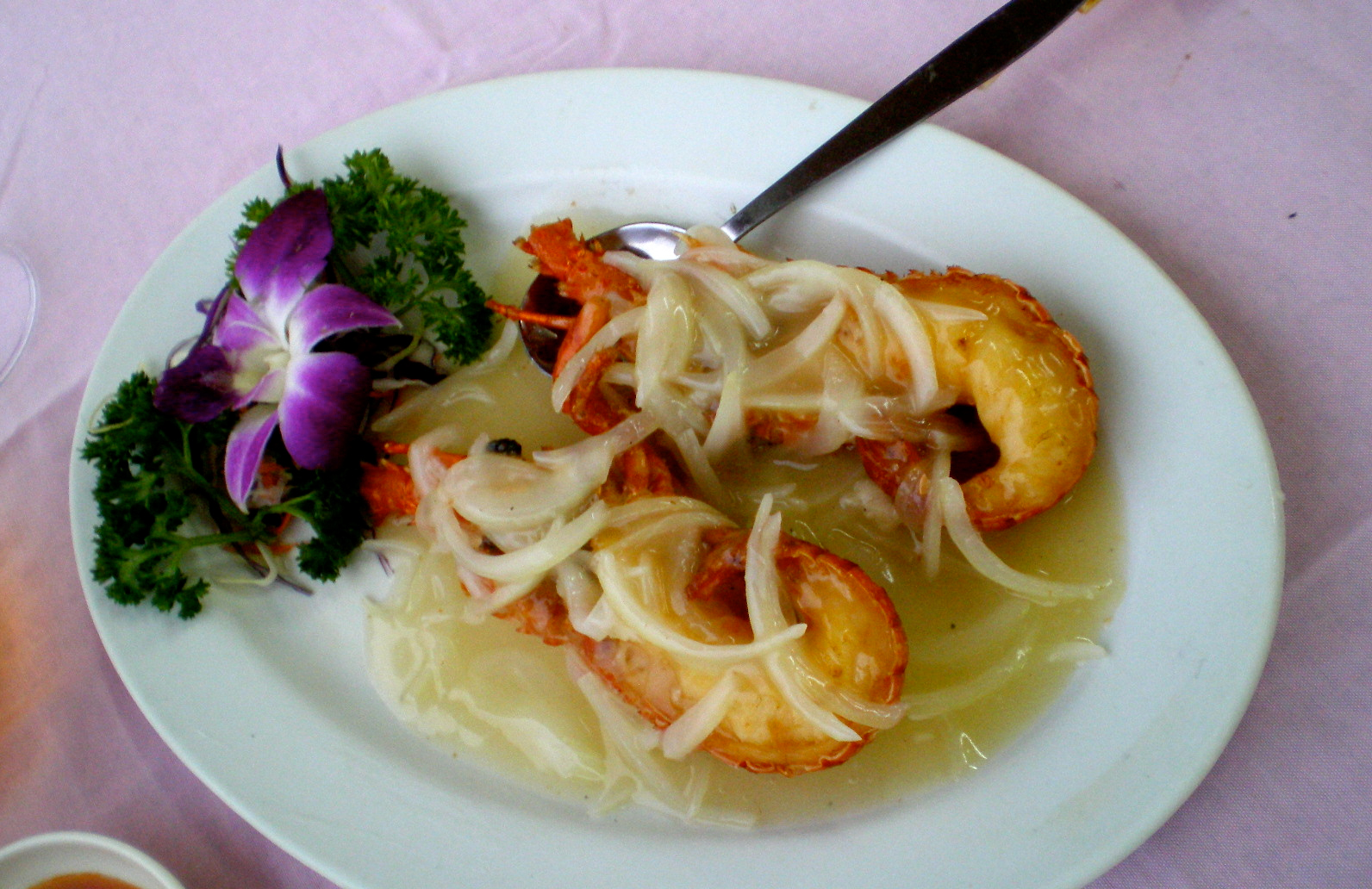
Metanephrops japonicus served in a creamy butter sauce
