= Mordellistenoda australiensis =

Scientific classification
- Domain: Eukaryota
- Kingdom: Animalia
- Phylum: Arthropoda
- Class: Insecta
- Order: Coleoptera
- Suborder: Polyphaga
- Infraorder: Cucujiformia
- Family: Mordellidae
- Subfamily: Mordellinae
- Tribe: Mordellistenini
- Genus: Mordellistenoda
- Species: M. australiensis

Binomial name
- Mordellistenoda australiensis Ermisch, 1963

Species of beetle

Mordellistenoda australiensis is a beetle in the genus Mordellistenoda of the family Mordellidae. It was described in 1963 by Ermisch.
