= Heinrich Balss =

German zoologist

Heinrich Balss (3 June 1886 – 17 September 1957) was a German zoologist, specialising in Crustacea, especially decapods. He was the chief conservator at the Zoologische Staatssammlung ("State Zoology Collection") at the Ludwig-Maximilians-Universität München, and wrote the sections on decapods and stomatopods in Heinrich Georg Bronn's seminal work Klassen und Ordnungen des Tierreichs ("Classes and Orders of the Animal Kingdom").

A number of taxa are named in his honor:

- Balssia Kemp, 1922
- Podocallichirus balssi (Monod, 1935)
- Detocarcinus balssi (Monod, 1956)
- Trizocheles balssi (Stebbing, 1914)
- Rhynchocinetes balssi Gordon, 1936
- Ctenocheles balssi Kishinouye, 1926
- Lebbeus balssi Hayashi, 1992
- Galathea balssi S. Miyake & K. Baba, 1964
