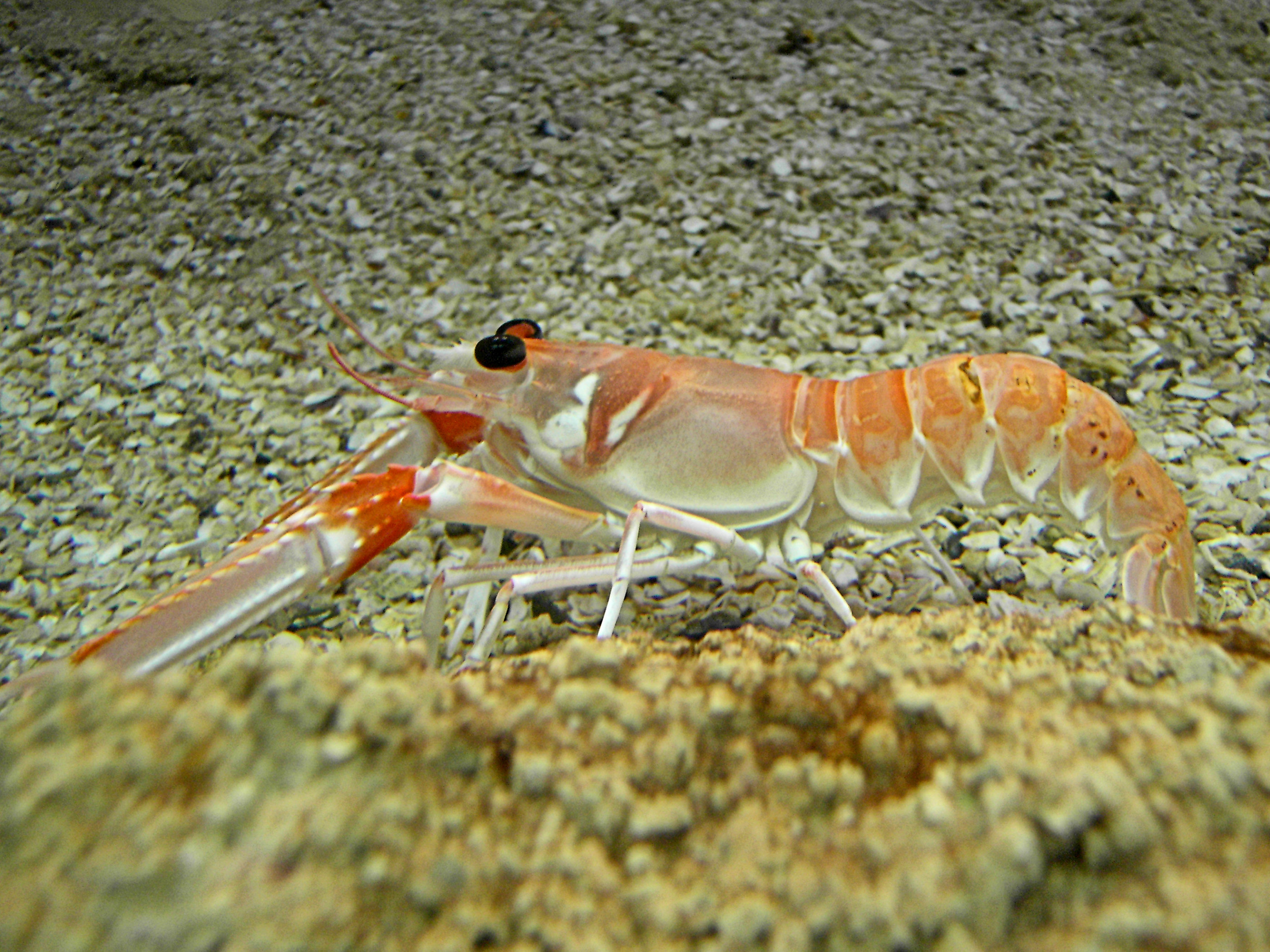

Conservation status
- Least Concern (IUCN 3.1)

Scientific classification
- Kingdom: Animalia
- Phylum: Arthropoda
- Clade: Pancrustacea
- Class: Malacostraca
- Order: Decapoda
- Suborder: Pleocyemata
- Family: Nephropidae
- Genus: Nephrops
- Species: N. norvegicus

Binomial name
- Nephrops norvegicus (Linnaeus, 1758)

Synonyms
- Cancer norvegicus Linnaeus, 1758; Astacus norvegicus Fabricius, 1775; Homarus norvegicus Weber, 1795; Astacus rugosus Rafinesque, 1814; Nephropsis cornubiensis Bate & Rowe, 1880

= Nephrops norvegicus =

Species of lobster

Nephrops norvegicus, known variously as the Norway lobster, Dublin Bay prawn, langoustine (compare langostino) or scampi, is a slim, coral-colored lobster that grows up to 25 cm (10 in) long. It is now the only extant species in the genus Nephrops, after several other species were moved to the closely related genus Metanephrops. It lives in the north-eastern Atlantic Ocean, and parts of the Mediterranean Sea, but is absent from the Baltic Sea and Black Sea. Adults emerge from their burrows at night to feed on worms and fish.

== Description ==
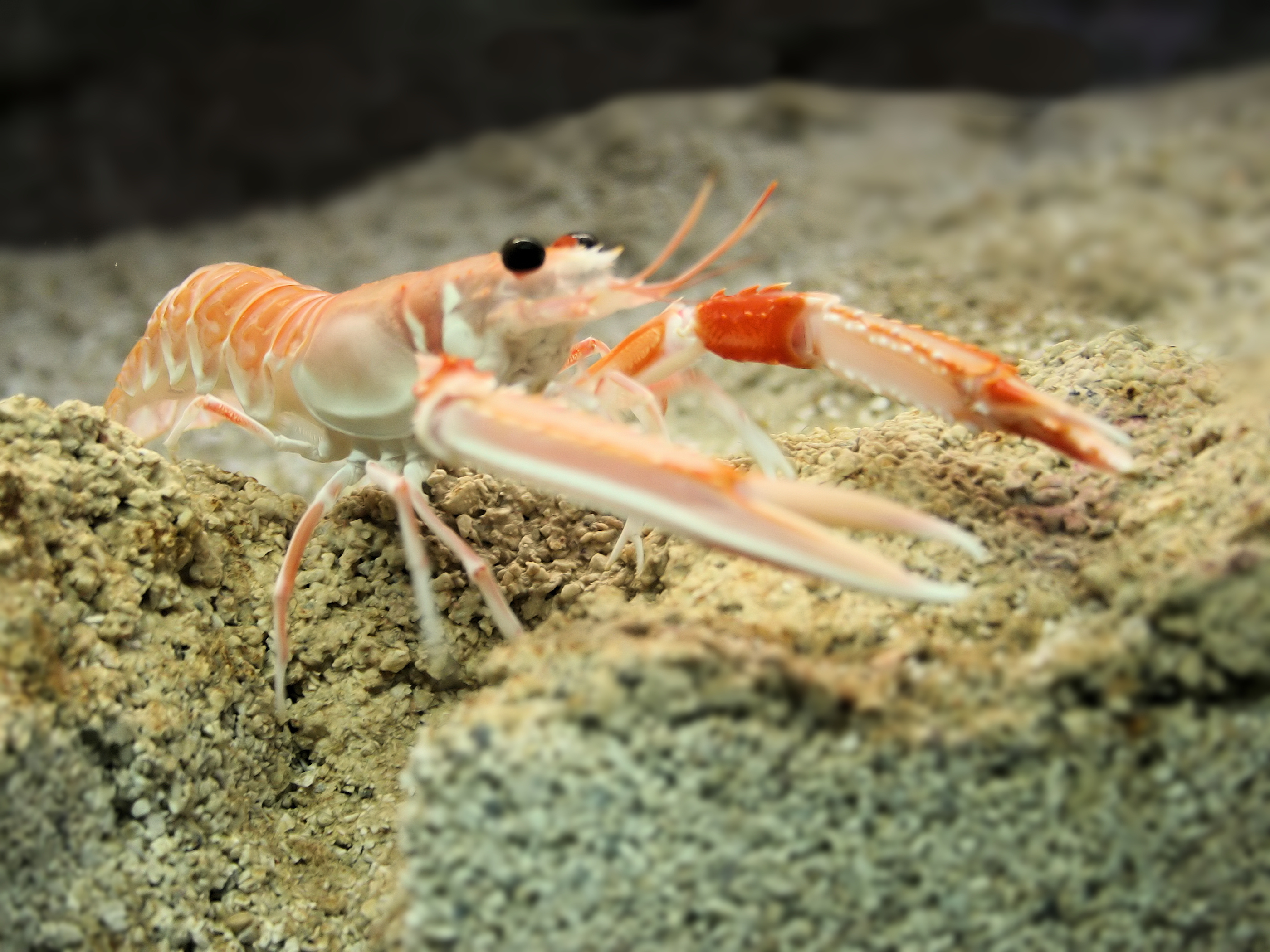
Nephrops norvegicus at Cretaquarium in Greece

Nephrops norvegicus has the typical body shape of a lobster, albeit narrower than the larger-bodied genus Homarus. It is pale orange in colour, and grows to a typical length of 18–20 centimetres (7–8 in), or exceptionally 25 cm (10 in) long, including the tail and claws. A carapace covers the animal's cephalothorax, while the abdomen is long and segmented, ending in a broad tail fan. The first three pairs of legs bear claws, of which the first are greatly elongated and bear ridges of spines. Of the two pairs of antennae, the second is the longer and thinner. There is a long, spinous rostrum, and the compound eyes are kidney-shaped, providing the name of the genus, from the Greek roots νεφρός (nephros, "kidney") and ὄψ ("eye").

== Distribution ==
Nephrops norvegicus is found in the north-eastern Atlantic Ocean and North Sea as far north as Iceland and northern Norway, and south to Portugal. It is found in the Mediterranean Sea and is common in the Adriatic Sea, notably the north Adriatic. It is absent from both the Black Sea and the Baltic Sea. Due to its ecological demands for particular sediments, N. norvegicus has a very patchy distribution, and is divided into over 30 populations. These populations are separated by inhospitable terrain, and adults rarely travel distances greater than a few hundred metres.

== Ecology ==
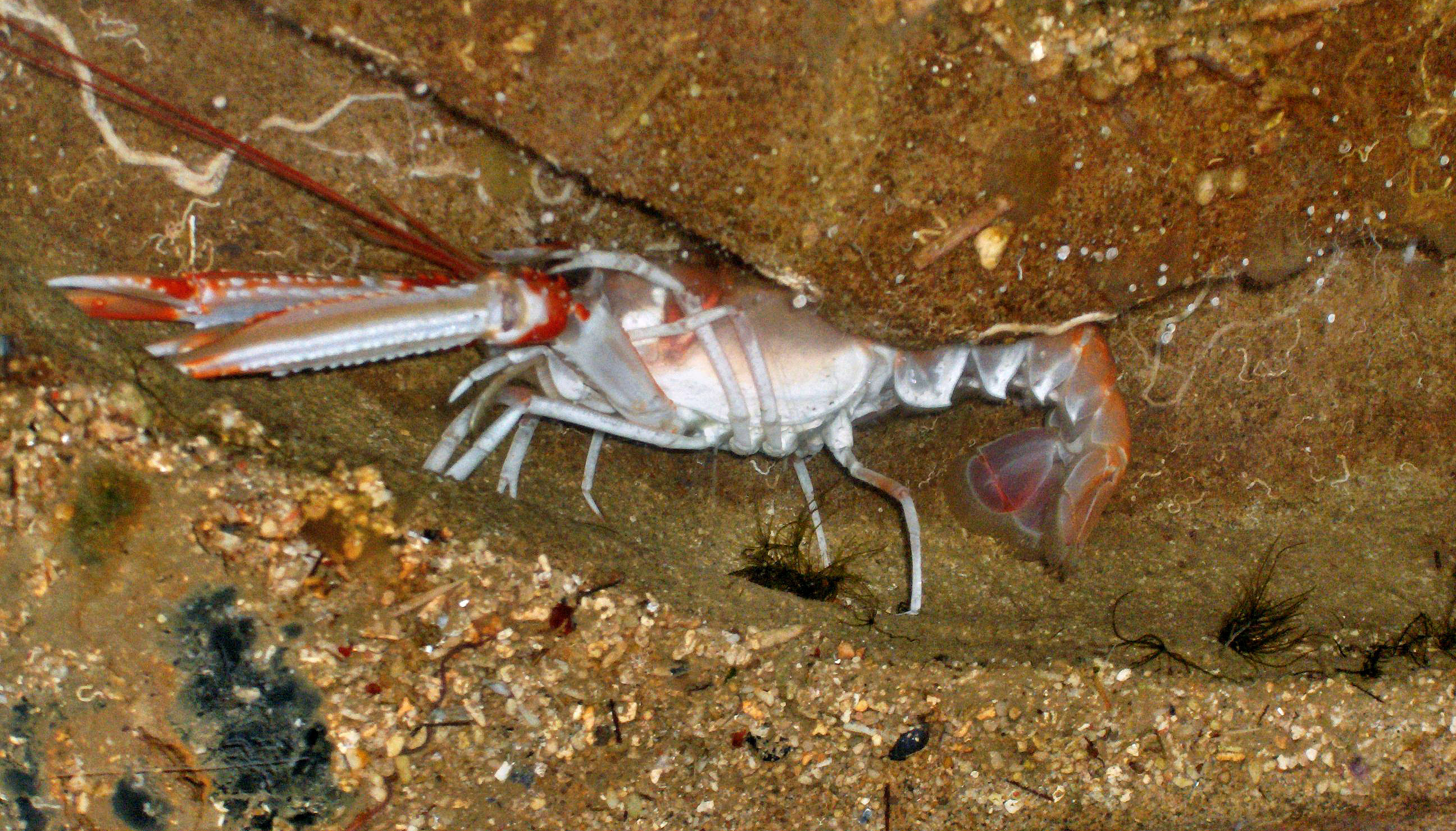
A Norway lobster in its burrow, at the Oceanographic Museum of Monaco.

Nephrops norvegicus adults prefer to inhabit muddy seabed sediments, with more than 40 percent silt and clay. Their burrows are semi-permanent, and vary in structure and size. Typical burrows are 20 to 30 centimetres (8 to 12 in) deep, with a distance of 50 to 80 centimetres (20 to 30 in) between the front and back entrances. Norway lobsters spend most of their time either lying in their burrows or by the entrance, leaving their shelters only to forage or mate.

=== Diet ===
Nephrops norvegicus is a scavenger and predator that makes short foraging excursions, mainly during periods of subdued light. They feed on active prey, including worms and fish, which they capture with their chelipeds and walking legs, and food is conveyed to the mouth using the anterior walking legs, assisted by the maxillipeds.

There is evidence that Nephrops norvegicus is a major eater of jellyfish.

=== Parasites and symbionts ===
Nephrops norvegicus is the host to a number of parasites and symbionts. A number of sessile organisms attach to the exoskeleton of N. norvegicus, including the barnacle Balanus crenatus and the foraminiferan Cyclogyra, but overall Nephrops suffers fewer infestations of such epibionts than other decapod crustaceans do. In December 1995, the commensal Symbion pandora was discovered attached to the mouthparts of Nephrops norvegicus, and was found to be the first member of a new phylum, Cycliophora, a finding described by Simon Conway Morris as "the zoological highlight of the decade". S. pandora has been found in many populations of N. norvegicus, both in the north Atlantic and in the Mediterranean Sea. Individuals may be found on most segments of the lobster's mouthparts, but are generally concentrated on the central parts of the larger mouthparts, from the mandible to the third maxilliped.

The most significant parasite of N. norvegicus is a dinoflagellate of the genus Hematodinium, which has caused epidemic infection in fished populations of N. norvegicus since the 1980s. Hematodinium is a genus that contains major pathogens of a wide variety of decapod crustaceans, although its internal taxonomy is poorly resolved. The species which attacks N. norvegicus causes a syndrome originally described as "post-moult syndrome", in which the carapace turns opaque and becomes highly pigmented, the haemolymph becomes milky white, and the animal appears moribund. Other parasites of N. norvegicus include the gregarine protozoan Porospora nephropis, the trematode Stichocotyle nephropis and the polychaete Histriobdella homari.

== Life cycle ==
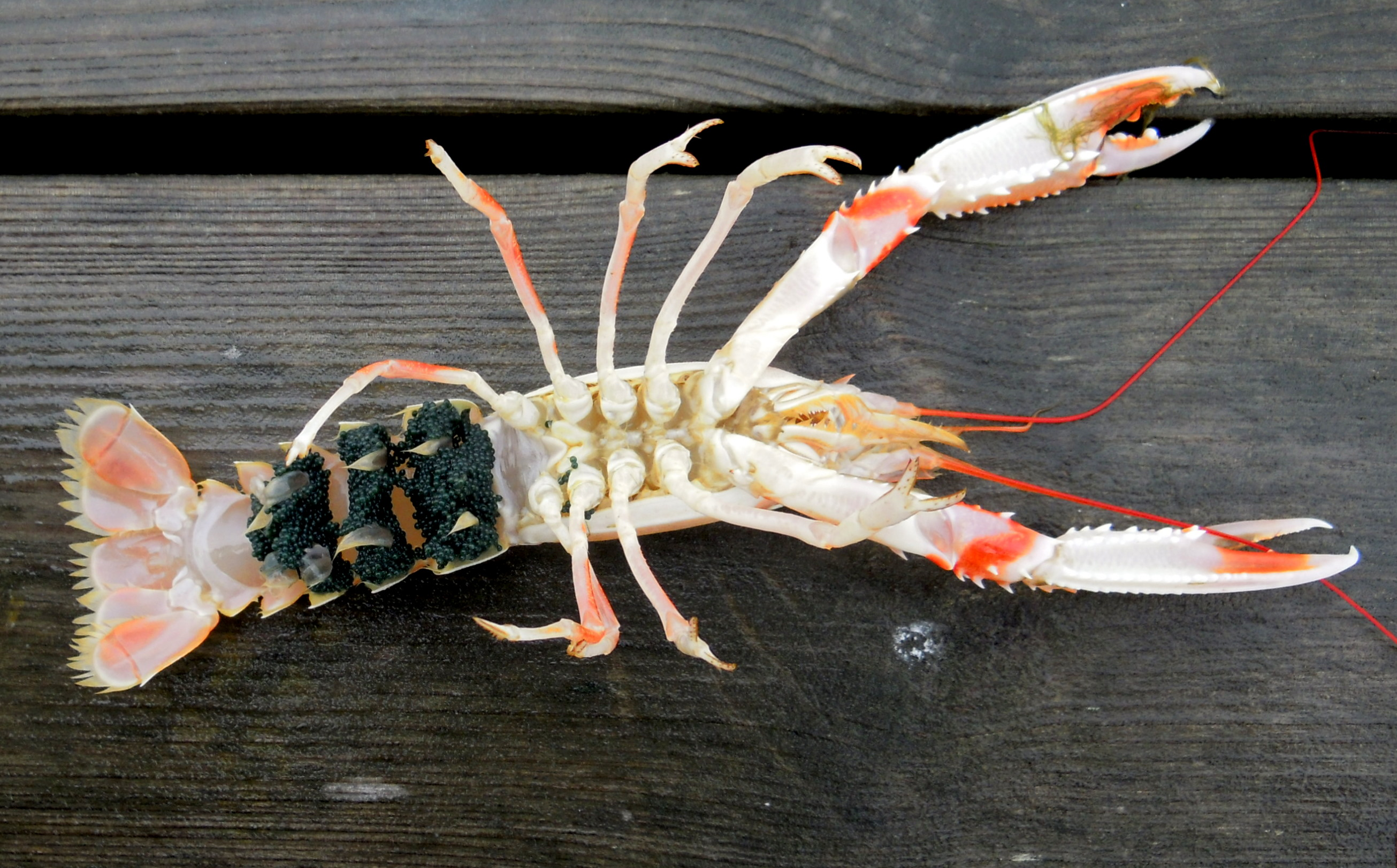
Adult female N. norvegicus with eggs

The typical life span of N. norvegicus is 5–10 years, reaching 15 years in exceptional cases. Its reproductive cycle varies depending on geographical position: "the periods of hatching and spawning, and the length of the incubation period, vary with latitude and the breeding cycle changes from annual to biennial as one moves from south to north". Incubation of eggs is temperature-dependent, and in colder climates, the duration of the incubation period increases. This means that, by the time hatching occurs, it may be too late for the females to take part in that year's breeding cycle. In warmer climates, the combined effects of recovery from moulting and ovary maturation mean that spawning can become delayed. This, in turn, has the effect of the female missing out a year of egg carrying.

Adult male Nephrops norvegicus moult once or twice a year (usually in late winter or spring) and adult females moult up to once a year (in late winter or spring, after hatching of the eggs). In annual breeding cycles, mating takes place in the spring or winter, when the females are in the soft, post-moult state. The ovaries mature throughout the spring and summer months, and egg-laying takes place in late summer or early autumn. After spawning, the berried (egg-carrying) females return to their burrows and remain there until the end of the incubation period. Hatching takes place in late winter or early spring. Soon after hatching, the females moult and mate again.

During the planktonic larval stage (typically 1 to 2 months in duration) the nephrops larvae exhibit a diel vertical migration behaviour as they are dispersed by the local currents. This complex biophysical interaction determines the fate of the larvae; the overlap between advective pathway destination and spatial distributions of suitable benthic habitats must be favourable in order for the larvae to settle and reach maturity.

== Fisheries ==
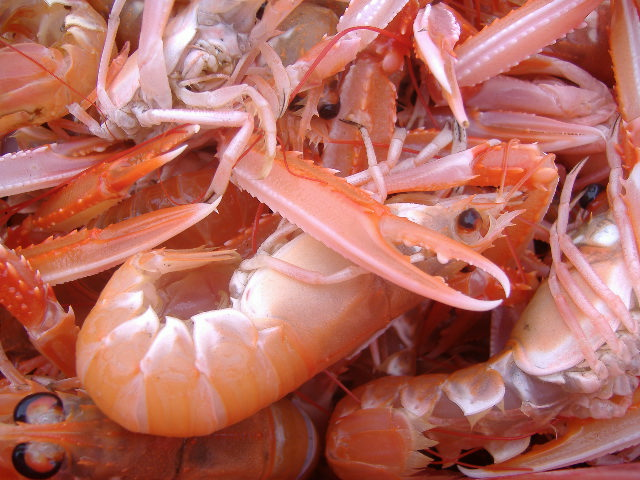
Freshly caught Nephrops norvegicus in Scotland

Commercial fishing for N. norvegicus has developed rapidly starting in the 1960s and is now one of the "most economically important fisheries in Europe", about 58% in the UK, 12% in Ireland, and 7% in the Mediterranean (Italy, Spain, Greece). This is a recent phenomenon: "unlike 50 years ago [1960s], [it] is now regarded as a delicious shellfish by chefs and consumers throughout Europe". N. norvegicus has been known in the Mediterranean longer, but until recently, "British fishermen dumped langoustines they caught as they were deemed not worth the effort".

The muscular tail of N. norvegicus is frequently eaten, and its meat is known as scampi or langoustine. N. norvegicus is eaten only on special occasions in Spain and Portugal, where it is less expensive than the common lobster, Homarus gammarus. N. norvegicus is an important species for fisheries, being caught mostly by trawling. Around 60,000 tonnes are caught annually, half of it in the United Kingdom's waters.

Besides the established trawling fleets, a significant number of fleets using lobster creels have developed. The better size and condition of lobsters caught by this method yield prices three to four times higher than animals netted by trawling. Creel fishing was found to have a reduced impact on the seafloor, require lower fuel consumption, and allow fishermen with smaller boats to participate in this high-value fishery. It has therefore been described as a reasonable alternative to demersal towed gears, and the allocation of additional fishing rights for this type of take has been suggested.

The North East Atlantic individual biological stocks of Nephrops are identified as functional units. A number of functional units make up the sea areas over which a total allowable catch (TAC) is set annually by the EU Council of Ministers. For example, the TAC set for North Sea Nephrops is based on the aggregate total tonnage of removals recommended by science for nine separate functional unit areas. This method has attracted criticism because it can promote the overexploitation of a specific functional unit even though the overall TAC is under-fished. In 2016, the UK implemented a package of emergency technical measures with the cooperation of the fishing industry aimed at reducing fishing activity to induce recovery of the Nephrops stock in the Farn(e) Deeps off North East England which was close to collapse. A stock assessment completed in 2018 by the International Council for the Exploration of the Sea (ICES) shows that fishing pressure has been cut and this stock is now below FMSY and that stock size is above MSY Btrigger meaning that the Farne Deeps nephrops stock is being fished at a sustainable level. However, ICES also warn that any substantial transfer of the current surplus fishing opportunities from other functional units to the Farne Deeps would rapidly lead to overexploitation. This suggests that controls on fishing effort should continue at least until the biomass reaches a size that is sustainable when measured against the level of fishing activity by all fishermen wanting to target the stock. In July 2023 the area north-east of Farnes Deep was one of three sites designated as a Highly Protected Marine Area.

Discards from Nephrops fishery may account for up to 37% of the energy requirements of certain marine scavengers, such as the hagfish Myxine glutinosa. Boats involved in Nephrops fishery also catch a number of fish species such as plaice and sole, and it is thought that without that revenue, Nephrops fishery would be economically unviable.

== Taxonomic history ==
Nephrops norvegicus was one of the species included by Carl Linnaeus in his 1758 10th edition of Systema Naturae, the starting point for zoological nomenclature. In that work, it was listed as Cancer Norvegicus, with a type locality of in Mari Norvegico ("in the Norwegian sea"). In choosing a lectotype, Lipke Holthuis restricted the type locality to the Kattegat at the Kullen Peninsula in southern Sweden (56°18′N 12°28′E). Two synonyms of the species have been published – "Astacus rugosus", described by the eccentric zoologist Constantine Samuel Rafinesque in 1814 from material collected in the Mediterranean Sea, and "Nephropsis cornubiensis", described by Charles Spence Bate and Joshua Brooking Rowe in 1880.

As new genera were erected, the species was moved, reaching its current position in 1814, when William Elford Leach erected the genus Nephrops to hold this species alone. Seven fossil species have since been described in the genus.

Populations in the Mediterranean Sea are sometimes separated as "Nephrops norvegicus var. meridionalis Zariquiey, 1935", although this taxon is not universally considered valid.
