= Joshua Brooking Rowe =

Joshua Brooking Rowe (12 June 1837 – 28 June 1908) was an English antiquarian and naturalist, researching and writing about history and wildlife in Devon.

== Life ==
Rowe was born in Plymouth on 12 June 1837, the only son of Joshua Brooking Rowe, printer and bookseller of Plymouth, and his second wife Harriett Caroline, daughter of Captain Charles Patey, R.N. Samuel Rowe, writer about Dartmoor, was his uncle. After education at a private school in Plymouth, the younger Joshua was in 1860 admitted a solicitor, and practised for many years in Plymouth in partnership with Francis Bulteel, and latterly with W. L. Munday.

Through life he devoted his leisure to literary and scientific research. A paper The Mammals, Birds, Reptiles, and Amphibians of Devon, which he read before the Plymouth Institution in 1862, was issued the following year. Subsequently he published much on archaeological topics, and encouraged local archaeological study. In 1862 he helped to form the Devon Association, of which he was president in 1882, and joint honorary secretary from 1901 until his death. He contributed over fifty papers to the Transactions of the association. In 1875 he was elected Fellow of the Society of Antiquaries of London, of which he was a local secretary. He was also a fellow of the Linnean Society of London, and a member of numerous antiquarian societies, being a founder of the Devon and Cornwall Record Society.

From 1882 he resided at Plympton St Maurice, where he was active in local affairs. He transcribed the parish registers for publication in the parish magazine. He died on 28 June 1908 at Plympton St Maurice, and was buried in the churchyard there. He bequeathed to Exeter Public Library his library of about 10,000 volumes, pamphlets and manuscripts, including an unpublished history of Plympton St Mary.

In December 1864 he married at St. Andrew's, Plymouth, Sara Foale, daughter of Henry Mews, of Plympton; they had no children.

== Works ==
Rowe revised Samuel Rowe's Perambulation of Dartmoor (1896), and also published:

1. The Cistercian Houses of Devon (1878).
2. The History of Plympton Erie (1906).
3. The Ecclesiastical History of Plymouth, 4 parts (1873-4-5-6).

He wrote for many local periodicals, and was joint editor of Devon Notes and Queries, some of his contributions to which were reprinted separately. He wrote the article "Mammals of Devon" for the Devon volume of Victoria County History.
