= Metanephrops neptunus =

Conservation status
- Least Concern (IUCN 3.1)

Scientific classification
- Kingdom: Animalia
- Phylum: Arthropoda
- Clade: Pancrustacea
- Class: Malacostraca
- Order: Decapoda
- Suborder: Pleocyemata
- Family: Nephropidae
- Genus: Metanephrops
- Species: M. neptunus

Binomial name
- Metanephrops neptunus (Bruce, 1965)

Species of lobster

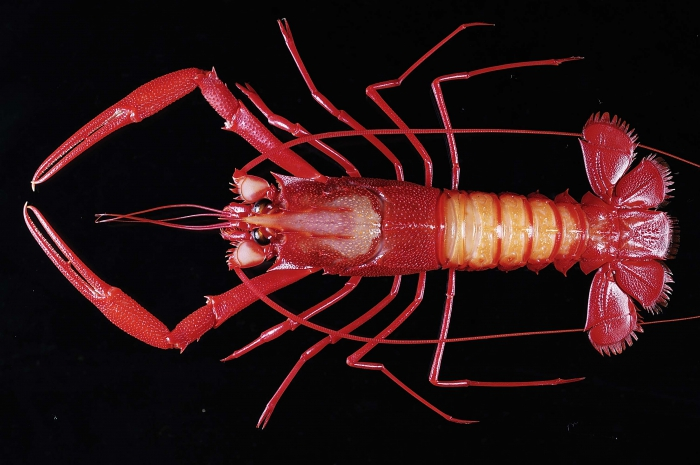
A specimen of M. neptunus

Metanephrops neptunus, the Neptune lobster, is a rare species of deep water lobster found in the South China Sea. They were first identified in 1965 by A.J. Bruce. They were originally classified as Nephrops before being later classified as Metanephrops. They are one of 18 extant species in the genus.

== Description ==
Metanephrops neptunus size ranges from 230 to 290 mm (9.1 to 11.4 in). It has a carapace covered in small forward facing spines. The two claws are similar in shape with the left being a bit smaller than the right. The cephalothorax is red and the abdomen is white. The eyes are black. Males are slightly larger than females.

== Habitat ==
Metanephrops neptunus are found in the South China Sea, Pacific Ocean, and Indian Ocean. They are found most commonly at depths of 500 to 800 metres (1,640 to 2,620 ft) but have been found as shallow as 300 metres (980 ft) and as deep as 940 metres (3,080 ft). M. neptunus are thought to burrow in the mud.

== Diet ==
Metanephrops neptunus are scavengers. They mainly eat detritus but have also been reported to eat nematodes, polychaetes, and other crustaceans.

== Evolution ==
Research into Metanephrops neptunus RNA suggests that they are one of the basal species of the Metanephrops genus. M. neptunus and another Metanephrops species, M. challengeri, are believed to have a shared common ancestor in the Late Cretaceous or earlier. The genus Metanephrops is thought to have originated in shallow waters in the South Atlantic before spreading to the Indian Ocean.
