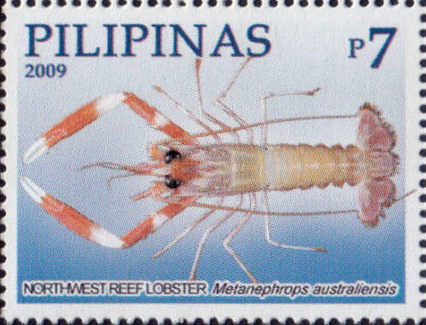

Conservation status
- Least Concern (IUCN 3.1)

Scientific classification
- Kingdom: Animalia
- Phylum: Arthropoda
- Clade: Pancrustacea
- Class: Malacostraca
- Order: Decapoda
- Suborder: Pleocyemata
- Family: Nephropidae
- Genus: Metanephrops
- Species: M. australiensis

Binomial name
- Metanephrops australiensis (Bruce, 1966)

Synonyms
- Nephrops australiensis Bruce, 1966

= Metanephrops australiensis =

Species of lobster

Metanephrops australiensis, commonly known as Australian scampi or the northwest lobster, is a species of lobster. It is found off the north-west coast of Western Australia, ranging from the city of Eucla to Indonesia. It is prolific near Port Hedland.
