= Metanephrops boschmai =

Conservation status
- Least Concern (IUCN 3.1)

Scientific classification
- Kingdom: Animalia
- Phylum: Arthropoda
- Class: Malacostraca
- Order: Decapoda
- Suborder: Pleocyemata
- Family: Nephropidae
- Genus: Metanephrops
- Species: M. boschmai

Binomial name
- Metanephrops boschmai (Holthuis, 1964)

Synonyms
- Nephrops boschmai Holthuis, 1964

Species of lobster

Metanephrops boschmai, known as the Bight lobster, Bight scampi or Boschma's scampi, is a species of lobster endemic to Western Australia.

== Distribution and habitat ==
M. boschmai is found around the west coasts of Australia, from Port Hedland in the north, to Eucla in the south. It lives at depths of 300–460 metres (980–1,510 ft) on muddy substrates, including those mixed with rubble.

== Description ==
M. boschmai grows to a total length of 18 centimetres (7.1 in), or a carapace length of 3–5 cm (1.2–2.0 in).

== Taxonomic history ==
M. boschmai was named in 1964 by Lipke Holthuis, originally as Nephrops boschmai, in Zoologische Mededelingen. The specific epithet commemorates Hilbrand Boschma, directory of the Rijksmuseum van Natuurlijke Historie and researcher into Acanthocephala, on the occasion of his 70th birthday. The type specimens were from the Great Australian Bight, off Eucla, Western Australia, and are deposited as the Australian Museum in Sydney, with paratypes deposited in the United States National Museum (Washington, D.C.) and the Rijksmuseum van Natuurlijke Historie in Leiden.
