= Metanephrops andamanicus =

Scientific classification
- Kingdom: Animalia
- Phylum: Arthropoda
- Class: Malacostraca
- Order: Decapoda
- Suborder: Pleocyemata
- Family: Nephropidae
- Genus: Metanephrops
- Species: M. andamanicus

Binomial name
- Metanephrops andamanicus (Wood-Mason, 1891)

Species of lobster

Metanephrops andamanicus, commonly known as the Andaman lobster, is a species of lobster. It grows up to 20 cm in length.

M. andamanicus was originally described as Nephrops andamanicus by James Wood-Mason.

== Distribution ==
It is found in the Indo-West Pacific, at a depth range between 250 and 750 meters. It may live in burrows, and is found on hard muddy substrate.
