= 2026 in arthropod paleontology =

This list records new taxa of fossil arthropods that were announced or described in 2026 (for insects, see 2026 in paleoentomology). Other peer-reviewed publications on discoveries related to arthropod paleontology which occurred in that year are also detailed here.

== Chelicerates ==
=== Arachnids ===
==== Araneae ====
Name	Novelty	Status	Authors	Age	Type locality	Country	Notes	Images
Antemicrothele	Gen. et sp. nov	Valid	Wunderlich	Mid-Cretaceous	Kachin amber	Myanmar	A spider, a member of Hexathelidae sensu lato (possibly a macrothelid). The type species is A. parva.	
Autotomiana patrickmuelleri	Sp. nov	Valid	Wunderlich	Mid-Cretaceous	Kachin amber	Myanmar	A spider, a member of Deinopoidea belonging to the family Autotomianidae.	
Balticonesticus unguis	Sp. nov	Valid	Wunderlich	Eocene	Baltic amber	Europe (Baltic Sea region)	A scaffold web spider.	
Burmesarchaea longichela	Sp. nov		Wang et al.	Late Cretaceous (Cenomanian)	Kachin amber	Myanmar	A spider belonging to the family Archaeidae.	
Burmesarchaea recticeps	Sp. nov		Wang et al.	Late Cretaceous (Cenomanian)	Kachin amber	Myanmar	A spider belonging to the family Archaeidae.	
?Cretotheridion aculeatum	Sp. nov	Valid	Wunderlich	Mid-Cretaceous	Kachin amber	Myanmar	A spider belonging to the family Theridiidae.	
Esuritor baltica	Sp. nov	Valid	Wunderlich	Eocene	Baltic amber	Europe (Baltic Sea region)	A nursery web spider.	
Lamellaphantes	Gen. et sp. nov	Valid	Wunderlich	Eocene	Baltic amber	Europe (Baltic Sea region)	A spider belonging to the family Linyphiidae. The type species is L. eozaen.	
Rovnopholcomma	Gen. et sp. nov	Valid	Eskov et al.	Eocene	Rovno amber	Ukraine	A spider belonging to the family Theridiidae. Genus includes new species R. wunderlichi.	
Rovnospermophoridus	Gen. et sp. nov	Valid	Wunderlich	Eocene	Rovno amber	Ukraine	A spider belonging to the family Pholcidae. The type species is R. damzeni.	
Stedotuber	Gen. et 2 sp. nov		Hou et al.	Mid-Cretaceous	Kachin amber	Myanmar	A spitting spider. Genus includes new species S. longitibialis and S. brevitibialis.	

===== Spider research =====
- Foxova & Dunlop (2026) describe a new specimen of Parvithele muelleri from the Cretaceous amber from Myanmar, providing new information on the anatomy of members of this species, and representing the largest Cretaceous member of Mesothelae reported to date.
- Two antrodiaetid specimens representing the first confirmed fossil record of Atypoidea from a Gondwana-derived terrane are described from the Cretaceous amber from Myanmar by Guo et al. (2026), who interpret this finding as evidence of dispersal of the antrodiaetid lineage into southern continents before the breakup of Pangaea.

==== Ixodida ====
===== Tick research =====
- Chitimia-Dobler et al. (2026) redescribe Haemaphysalis (Alloceraea) cretacea on the basis of data from a new specimen from the Cretaceous amber from Myanmar, and recombine the species as Alloceraea cretacea.

==== Opilioacarida ====
Name	Novelty	Status	Authors	Age	Type locality	Country	Notes	Images
Plesioacarus	Gen. et sp. nov		Xuan et al.	Cretaceous	Kachin amber	Myanmar	The type genus of the new family Plesioacaridae. The type species is P. minutus.	

==== Opiliones ====
Name	Novelty	Status	Authors	Age	Type locality	Country	Notes	Images
Balticolasma	Gen. et sp. nov	Valid	Bartel et al.	Eocene	Baltic amber	Europe (Baltic Sea region)	A harvestman belonging to the family Nemastomatidae. The type species is B. wunderlichi.	

===== Opiliones research =====
- A harvestman with pedipalp morphology distinct from those of other fossil and extant members of the group is described from the Eocene Baltic amber by Gerbe et al. (2026).

==== Pseudoscorpiones ====
Name	Novelty	Status	Authors	Age	Type locality	Country	Notes	Images
Baltochthonius	Gen. et sp. nov	Valid	Turbanov et al.	Eocene	Baltic amber	Europe (Baltic Sea region)	A member of the family Chthoniidae. Genus includes new species B. andrushchenkoi.	
Burmachernes	Gen. et sp. nov	Valid	Willmott, Kotthoff & Harms	Late Cretaceous (Cenomanian)	Kachin amber	Myanmar	A member of the family Chernetidae. The type species is B. cenomanium.	
Heterolophus eridanus	Sp. nov	Valid	Turbanov et al.	Eocene	Baltic amber	Europe (Baltic Sea region)	A species of Heterolophus.	

===== Pseudoscorpion research =====
- A female pseudoscorpion belonging to the group Iocheirata that carried a brood sac while grasping a leg of a fly is reported from a piece of the Eocene Baltic amber by Feng et al. (2026).

==== Ricinulei ====
Name	Novelty	Status	Authors	Age	Type locality	Country	Notes	Images
Protoricinus	Gen. et comb. et sp. nov	Valid	Gamarra-Cuba, Selden & Delclòs	Late Cretaceous (Cenomanian)	Kachin amber	Myanmar	A member of Posteriorricinulei. The type species is "Poliochera" cretacea Wunderlich (2012); genus also includes new species P. solorzanoae.	

==== Sarcoptiformes ====
Name	Novelty	Status	Authors	Age	Type locality	Country	Notes	Images
Ceratozetes acutipteromorphus	Sp. nov		Yu et al.	Late Cretaceous (Cenomanian)	Kachin amber	Myanmar	A member of the family Ceratozetidae.	
Diapterobates gracilipes	Sp. nov		Yu et al.	Late Cretaceous (Cenomanian)	Kachin amber	Myanmar	A member of the family Ceratozetidae.	
Haplochthonius nortoni	Sp. nov	Valid	Vorontsov & Kolesnikov	Late Cretaceous (Cenomanian)	Kachin amber	Myanmar	A member of the family Haplochthoniidae.	

==== Scorpiones ====
Name	Novelty	Status	Authors	Age	Type locality	Country	Notes	Images
Betaburmesebuthus andreschmidti	Sp. nov	Valid	Lourenço in Lourenço & Velten	Cretaceous	Kachin amber	Myanmar	A scorpion belonging to the family Palaeoburmesebuthidae.	
Chaerilobuthus franzschmidti	Sp. nov	Valid	Lourenço in Lourenço & Velten	Cretaceous	Kachin amber	Myanmar	A scorpion belonging to the family Chaerilobuthidae.	
Chaerilobuthus muelleri	Sp. nov	Valid	Lourenço in Lourenço & Velten	Cretaceous	Kachin amber	Myanmar	A scorpion belonging to the family Chaerilobuthidae.	
Spinochaerilobuthus	Gen. et sp. nov	Valid	Lourenço in Lourenço & Velten	Cretaceous	Kachin amber	Myanmar	A scorpion belonging to the family Chaerilobuthidae. The type species is S. andreschmidti.	

===== Scorpion research =====
- Howard et al. (2026) redescribe Praearcturus gigas, and interpret Brontoscorpio anglicus and Bennettarthra annwnensis as junior synonyms of P. gigas.
- Fossil material of the oldest North American member of Orthosterni reported to date is described from the Carboniferous (Bashkirian) Pottsville Formation (Alabama, United States) by Conway et al. (2026).

==== Trombidiformes ====
Name	Novelty	Status	Authors	Age	Type locality	Country	Notes	Images
Acarohystrix	Gen. et sp. nov	Valid	Xuan et al.	Late Cretaceous (Cenomanian)	Kachin amber	Myanmar	A mite distantly related to the extant Chyzeriidae; the type genus of the new family Acarohystricidae. The type species is A. magnifica.	
Calidothrombium	Gen. et sp. nov	Valid	Costa et al.	Cretaceous	Kachin amber	Myanmar	A mite belonging to the family Tanaupodidae. The type species is C. burmiticum.	
Decaphyllobius hispaniolus	Sp. nov	Valid	Zmudzinski	Miocene	Dominican amber	Dominican Republic	A mite belonging to the family Camerobiidae.	
Erythrites longifemoralis	Sp. nov	Valid	Liu, Fan & Ren	Late Cretaceous (Cenomanian)	Kachin amber	Myanmar	A mite belonging to the family Erythraeidae.	
Erythrites multifoveolatus	Sp. nov	Valid	Liu, Fan & Ren	Late Cretaceous (Cenomanian)	Kachin amber	Myanmar	A mite belonging to the family Erythraeidae.	
Protofilum	Gen. et sp. nov	Valid	Xuan, Zhang and Huang in Xuan et al.	Cretaceous		Myanmar	A mite belonging to the family Erythraeidae. The type species is P. ordinatum.	
Punkochyzeria obtuse	Sp. nov	Valid	Xuan et al.	Late Cretaceous (Cenomanian)	Kachin amber	Myanmar	A mite belonging to the family Acarohystricidae.	

==== General arachnid research ====
- Dunlop & Harms (2026) review the fossil record of Palpigradi, Solifugae, Ricinulei, Amblypygi, Thelyphonida and Schizomida.
- A study on the anatomy and affinities of Chimerarachne is published by Eskov et al. (2026), who interpret the studied arachnid as likely more closely related to modern spiders than to Uraraneida.

=== Eurypterids ===
==== Eurypterid research ====
- Dernov (2026) revises the taxonomic status of Eurypterus "podolicus", finds the species to be a nomen nudum, and considers its fossil material to lack morphological features justifying establishment of a new species.
- New information on the anatomy of Malongia mirabilis is provided by Ma et al. (2026).

=== Xiphosurans ===
Name	Novelty	Status	Authors	Age	Type locality	Country	Notes	Images
Polonolimulus	Gen. et sp. nov	Valid	Audycki et al.	Early Triassic (Olenekian)	Zagnańsk/Goleniawy Formation	Poland	A member of the family Austrolimulidae. The type species is P. zaleziankensis.	

==== Xiphosuran research ====
- Fossils of large-bodied horseshoe crabs, associated with trace fossils assigned to the new ichnospecies Selenichnites sursumdeorsum, are described from the Ordovician (Darriwilian) Saq Formation (Saudi Arabia) by Bicknell et al. (2026), who interpret the presence of the studied specimens in a nearshore environment and their preservation in storm-deposited layers as possible evidence of similarity of spawning behaviors of Ordovician and modern horseshoe crabs.
- Feng et al. (2026) report trace fossils from the Lower Triassic Daye Formation (China) interpreted as evidence of predation of horseshoe crabs on polychaetes.
- Traces likely produced by large-bodied horseshoe crabs are reported from the Lower Triassic Nanlinghu Formation (China) by Wang et al. (2026).

=== Other chelicerates ===
Name	Novelty	Status	Authors	Age	Type locality	Country	Notes	Images
Magnicornaspis	Gen. et sp. nov		Bicknell, Kimmig, Goodman, Turner & Smith	Cambrian Stage 10	Rivière-du-Loup Formation	Canada (Quebec)	A corcoraniid chelicerate. The type species is M. garwoodi.	
Megachelicerax	Gen. et sp. nov	Valid	Lerosey-Aubril & Ortega-Hernández	Cambrian	Wheeler Shale	United States (Utah)	A stem-chelicerate. The type species is M. cousteaui.	

==== Other chelicerate research ====
- New information on the anatomy and affinities of the stem-chelicerate Urokodia aequalis is provided by Liu et al. (2026).

== Crustaceans ==
=== Malacostracans ===
Name	Novelty	Status	Authors	Age	Type locality	Country	Notes	Images
Araripecaris	Gen. et sp. nov	Valid	Rufino et al.	Early Cretaceous (Aptian–Albian)	Romualdo Formation	Brazil	A member of Caridea, possibly a member of the family Palaemonidae. The type species is A. ipubiensis.	
Bittnerilia lucentumensis	Sp. nov	Valid	Artal, Onetti & Àlex	Eocene		Spain	A crab belonging to the family Calappidae.	
Cicero	Gen. et sp. nov	Valid	Lima et al.	Early Cretaceous (Aptian)	Crato Formation	Brazil	An isopod belonging to the family Archaeoniscidae. The type species is C. spectabilis.	
Clibanarius rosellae	Sp. nov	Valid	De Angeli, Garassino & Charbonnier	Eocene (Bartonian)		Italy	A hermit crab belonging to the family Diogenidae.	
Crangopsis baljaffrayensis	Sp. nov	Valid	Clark	Carboniferous		United Kingdom	A member of Peracarida belonging to the group Mysidacea. Published online in 2026, but the issue date is listed as October 2025.	
Crangopsis carlopsensis	Sp. nov	Valid	Clark	Carboniferous		United Kingdom	A member of Peracarida belonging to the group Mysidacea. Published online in 2026, but the issue date is listed as October 2025.	
Eorhomalus	Gen. et sp. nov	Valid	De Angeli, Garassino & Charbonnier	Eocene (Bartonian)		Italy	A hermit crab belonging to the family Paguridae. Genus includes new species E. alontensis.	
Heterosquilla tankertonensis	Sp. nov	Valid	Veitch	Eocene (Ypresian)	London Clay	United Kingdom	A mantis shrimp, a species of Heterosquilla.	
Iberophthalmus	Gen. et sp. nov	Valid	Ferratges & Zamora in Ferratges et al.	Middle Jurassic (Bajocian)		Spain	A crab belonging to the family Longodromitidae. The type species is I. leceraensis.	
Joeranina scheitzi	Sp. nov	Valid	Charbonnier et al.	Early Cretaceous (Albian)		France	A crab belonging to the family Palaeocorystidae.	
Karumballichirus birmanica	Comb. nov	Valid	(Noetling)	Miocene		Myanmar	A member of the family Callichiridae; moved from Callianassa birmanica Noetling (1901).	
Karumballichirus dijki	Comb. nov	Valid	(Martin)	Miocene		Indonesia; Philippines	A member of the family Callichiridae; moved from Callianassa dijki Martin (1883).	
Karumballichirus pseudoniloticus	Comb. nov	Valid	(Lőrenthey in Lőrenthey & Beurlen)	Eocene		Hungary; Spain	A member of the family Callichiridae; moved from Callianassa pseudonilotica Lőrenthey in Lőrenthey & Beurlen (1929).	
Karumballichirus pustulatus	Comb. nov	Valid	(Withers)	Eocene-Oligocene		Barbados	A member of the family Callichiridae; moved from Callianassa pustulata Withers (1926).	
Karumballichirus trechmanni	Comb. nov	Valid	(Withers)	Eocene		Jamaica	A member of the family Callichiridae; moved from Callianassa trechmanni Withers (1924).	
Karumballichirus vidali	Comb. nov	Valid	(Vía Boada)	Eocene		Spain	A member of the family Callichiridae; moved from Callianassa vidali Vía Boada (1959).	
Latheticocarcinus sergeevi	Sp. nov	Valid	Mychko & Schweitzer	Paleocene (Thanetian)	Saratov Formation	Russia (Saratov Oblast)	A crab belonging to the family Homolidae.	
Linuparus dehesaensis	Sp. nov		Ferratges, Zamora & Bádenas	Cretaceous (Albian-Cenomanian)	Transitional marls between the Utrillas and Mosqueruela formations	Spain	A spiny lobster, a species of Linuparus.	
Lucentiplax	Gen. et sp. nov	Valid	Ferratges	Eocene		Spain	A crab belonging to the family Euryplacidae. Genus includes new species L. bravoi.	
Mioserolis	Gen. et sp. nov		Schweitzer et al.	Miocene (Burdigalian)	Estancia 25 de Mayo Formation	Argentina	An isopod belonging to the family Serolidae. Genus includes new species M. feldmanni.	
Nephropsis larryi	Sp. nov	Valid	Zollinger & Schweitzer	Oligocene	Lincoln Creek Formation	United States (Washington)	A species of Nephropsis.	
Orgianopsus	Gen. et sp. nov	Valid	De Angeli & Garassino	Eocene		Italy	A crab belonging to the group Grapsoidea. Genus includes new species O. bericus.	
Paranecrocarcinus perchati	Sp. nov	Valid	Charbonnier et al.	Early Cretaceous (Albian)		France	A crab belonging to the family Necrocarcinidae.	
Pinnotheres prochowniki	Sp. nov		Groff et al.	Miocene		United States (Maryland; Virginia)	A crab belonging to the family Pinnotheridae.	
Polybius appeldoornae	Sp. nov	Valid	Coole & De Angeli	Miocene		France	A crab, a species of Polybius.	
Pygocephalus brymboensis	Sp. nov	Valid	Astrop	Carboniferous	Coal Measures Group	United Kingdom	A member of Pygocephalomorpha.	
Pyreneites	Gen. et sp. nov	Valid	Ferratges, Domínguez & Ossó	Eocene	Margas de Pamplona Formation	Spain	A crab belonging to the family Polybiidae. The type species is P. fandielloensis.	
Rathbunopon brisaci	Sp. nov	Valid	Charbonnier et al.	Early Cretaceous (Albian)		France	A crab belonging to the group Homolodromioidea and the family Prosopidae.	
Tanidromites ciceroides	Sp. nov	Valid	Ferratges & Zamora in Ferratges et al.	Middle Jurassic (Bajocian)		Spain	A crab belonging to the family Tanidromitidae.	
Tanidromites monevaensis	Sp. nov	Valid	Ferratges & Zamora in Ferratges et al.	Middle Jurassic (Bajocian)		Spain	A crab belonging to the family Tanidromitidae.	
Volgacarcinus	Gen. et sp. nov	Valid	Mychko & Schweitzer	Paleocene (Thanetian)	Saratov Formation	Russia (Saratov Oblast)	A crab belonging to the family Necrocarcinidae. The type species is V. longispinus.	

==== Malacostracan research ====
- Evidence of sexual dimorphism in the length and shape of the carapace of Soomicaris ordosensis is presented by Liu et al. (2026).
- Revision of pygocephalomorphs belonging to the genus Pygocephalus from the Carboniferous strata from Nova Scotia (Canada) is published by Laville, Andréo & Atkins (2026).
- Purported tanaidacean Cretitanais giganteus is reinterpreted as an isopod and a junior synonym of Urda stemmerbergensis by Schädel (2026).
- A study on the moulting patterns and growth of Cretapenaeus berberus from the Cretaceous Kem Kem Group (Morocco) is published by Lynch et al. (2026).
- Evidence of reduction of morphological diversity of extant members of Polychelida compared to their extinct relatives is presented by König et al. (2026).
- Burrow casts interpreted as the first evidence of crayfish activity in the main Karoo Basin are reported from the Middle Triassic Burgersdorp Formation (South Africa) by Wolvaardt et al. (2026).
- The oldest confirmed parastacid body fossil material from South America reported to date, likely representing a previously unrecognized lineage with possible affinities with Malagasy taxa, is described from the Upper Cretaceous (Maastrichtian) Los Alamitos Formation (Argentina) by Chimento et al. (2026).
- Luque et al. (2026) report the discovery of new fossil material of tepexicarcinoid crabs from the Cenomanian–Turonian strata of the Eagle Ford succession in Coahuila (Mexico), providing new information on the morphology of members of the superfamily.
- Gašparič et al. (2026) describe fossil material of Bathynectes muelleri from the Miocene strata in Slovenia, extending known geographical range of the species.
- Bicknell et al. (2026) study the exoskeletal elemental composition of Bombur complicatus, Caryocaris curvilata, Mecochirus sp., Sculda syriaca and Tealliocaris woodwardi, reporting evidence of higher levels of phosphorus in the studied taxa compared with modern crustaceans, either resulting from diagenetic phosphatization of fossil crustaceans or reflecting genuine composition of their original exoskeletons.
- Hyžný, Di Franco & Lukeneder (2026) revise the fossil record of Carnian decapod crustaceans from the Polzberg Lagerstätte (Austria) and Cave del Predil (Italy), and transfer the species "Aeger" crassipes to the genus Distaeger.
- A study on changes of diversity of decapod crustaceans throughout their evolutionary history, as indicated by their fossil record, is published by Schweitzer, De Grave & Hyžný (2026).

=== Ostracods ===
Name	Novelty	Status	Authors	Age	Type locality	Country	Notes	Images
Asciocythere uralte	Sp. nov	Valid	Díez Somolinos et al.	Early Cretaceous (Barremian)	Tragacete Formation	Spain	A member of the family Schulerideidae.	
Brasacypris mourae	Sp. nov		Almeida-Lima et al.			Brazil		
Cypridea buraigensis	Sp. nov		Díez-Somolinos et al.	Early Cretaceous (Barremian)	Tragacete Formation	Spain	A member of Podocopida belonging to the family Cyprideidae.	
Cypridea cisnerosi	Sp. nov		Díez-Somolinos et al.	Early Cretaceous (Barremian)	Tragacete Formation	Spain	A member of Podocopida belonging to the family Cyprideidae.	
Cypridea mohgi	Sp. nov		Díez-Somolinos et al.	Early Cretaceous (Barremian)	Tragacete Formation	Spain	A member of Podocopida belonging to the family Cyprideidae.	
Cypridea plutoi	Sp. nov		Díez-Somolinos et al.	Early Cretaceous (Barremian)	Tragacete Formation	Spain	A member of Podocopida belonging to the family Cyprideidae.	
Cypridea superposita	Sp. nov		Almeida-Lima et al.			Brazil		
Cypridea trapezoidalis	Sp. nov		Almeida-Lima et al.			Brazil		
Daleiella? cincinnatiensis	Sp. nov	Valid	Zhang et al.	Ordovician	Liberty Formation	United States (Ohio)	A member of Podocopida belonging to the family Pachydomellidae.	
Damonella bennui	Sp. nov		Díez-Somolinos et al.	Early Cretaceous (Barremian)	Tragacete Formation	Spain	A member of the family Candonidae.	
Deyangia rhodopetra	Sp. nov		Choi & Wang	Early Cretaceous (Valanginian–Hauterivian)	Cangxi Formation	China		
Glyptocythere khabarovae	Sp. nov	Valid	Tesakova	Middle Jurassic		Russia		
Glyptocythere kiklica	Sp. nov	Valid	Tesakova	Middle Jurassic		Russia		
Glyptocythere scissa	Sp. nov	Valid	Tesakova	Middle Jurassic		Russia		
Glyptocythere transversa	Sp. nov	Valid	Tesakova	Middle Jurassic		Russia		
Gutschickia? araucaria	Sp. nov	Valid	Bergue et al.	Permian (Lopingian)	Rio do Rasto Formation	Brazil		
Gutschickia? joelcastroi	Sp. nov	Valid	Bergue et al.	Permian (Guadalupian)	Teresina Formation	Brazil		
Hollinella bahramensis	Sp. nov		Song in Song et al.	Devonian	Bahram Formation	Iran		
Jhurancythere	Gen. et sp. nov	Valid	Kumari & Mahalakshmi in Kumari, Mahalakshmi & Muduli	Late Jurassic (Kimmeridgian)	Jhuran Formation	India	A member of the family Cytherideidae. Genus includes new species J. austerata. Published online in 2026, but the issue date is listed as December 2025.	
Knoxina pax	Sp. nov		Song in Song et al.	Devonian	Bahram Formation	Iran	A member of the family Geisinidae.	
Metacytheropteron aronnaxi	Sp. nov	Valid	Díez Somolinos et al.	Early Cretaceous (Barremian)	Tragacete Formation	Spain	A member of the family Cytheruridae.	
Milleratia binodosa	Sp. nov	Valid	Zhang et al.	Ordovician	Liberty Formation	United States (Ohio)	A member of Platycopida belonging to the family Primitiidae.	
Nostromo	Gen. et sp. nov		Díez-Somolinos et al.	Early Cretaceous (Barremian)	Tragacete Formation	Spain	A member of the family Notodromadidae. The type species is N. weaverae.	
Petasobairdia scylla	Sp. nov	Valid	Forel, Sciuto & Reitano	Late Triassic (Carnian)	Mufara Formation	Italy	A member of the family Bairdiidae.	
Rhinocypris? rlyehensis	Sp. nov		Díez-Somolinos et al.	Early Cretaceous (Barremian)	Tragacete Formation	Spain	A member of Podocopida belonging to the family Ilyocyprididae.	
Rhinocypris spinacurtis	Sp. nov		Almeida-Lima et al.			Brazil		
Salvadoriella naharensis	Sp. nov		Díez-Somolinos et al.	Early Cretaceous (Barremian)	Tragacete Formation	Spain	A member of the family Candonidae.	
Theriosynoecum compressum	Sp. nov		Almeida-Lima et al.			Brazil		
Theriosynoecum rodriguezlazaroi	Sp. nov		Díez-Somolinos et al.	Early Cretaceous (Barremian)	Tragacete Formation	Spain	A member of the family Limnocytheridae.	
Triadohealdia kharybdis	Sp. nov	Valid	Forel, Sciuto & Reitano	Late Triassic (Carnian)	Mufara Formation	Italy	A member of the family Healdiidae.	
Whipplella sanjeronimensis	Sp. nov	Valid	Bergue et al.	Permian (Lopingian)	Rio do Rasto Formation	Brazil		

==== Ostracod research ====
- A study on the composition of the Devonian (Pragian) ostracod assemblage from the Lilydale Limestone (Australia) is published by Camilleri et al. (2026).
- Golfinopoulos et al. (2026) report the first discovery of ostracods from the Lower Jurassic strata exposed in Greece.
- Evidence of impact of environmental changes in the Lake Pannon area on diversification of members of the genus Cyprideis during the middle and late Miocene is presented by Pipík, Gross & Starek (2026).

=== Thecostracans ===
Name	Novelty	Status	Authors	Age	Type locality	Country	Notes	Images
Angulalepas	Gen. et comb. nov	Valid	Gale	Late Cretaceous (Campanian)		Sweden	A barnacle, the type genus of the new family Angulalepadidae. The type species is "Pollicipes" nilssoni Steenstrup (1839); genus also includes "Calantica (Scillaelepas)" angulata Withers (1935).	
Arcuatoscalpellum carlssoni	Sp. nov	Valid	Gale	Late Cretaceous (Campanian)		Sweden	A barnacle belonging to the family Scalpellidae.	
Bosquetlepas schneideri	Sp. nov	Valid	Gale & Jagt	Late Cretaceous (Campanian)		Germany		
Crithmumlepas alifer	Sp. nov	Valid	Gale			United Kingdom		
Epibrachylepas lineatus	Sp. nov	Valid	Gale	Late Cretaceous (Campanian)		Sweden	A barnacle belonging to the family Brachylepadidae.	
Fountainlepas	Gen. et sp. nov	Valid	Gale & Sadorf	Pliocene (Piacenzian)	Yorktown Formation	United States (North Carolina)	A barnacle belonging to the family Platylepadidae. The type species is F. hayashii.	
Jagtscalpellum kaeckei	Sp. nov	Valid	Gale & Jagt	Late Cretaceous (Campanian)		Germany		
Microcorona	Gen. et sp. nov	Valid	Gale & Jagt	Late Cretaceous (Campanian and Maastrichtian)		Germany; Netherlands	A barnacle belonging to the family Brachylepadidae. The type species is M. girodi.	
Protochelonibia collaretai	Sp. nov	Valid	Gale & Sadorf	Pliocene	Probably Yorktown Formation	United States (North Carolina)	A barnacle belonging to the family Chelonibiidae.	
Regioscalpellum ahlbergi	Sp. nov	Valid	Gale	Late Cretaceous (Campanian)		Sweden	A barnacle belonging to the family Scalpellidae.	
Striatobalanus makiyamai	Sp. nov	Valid	Karasawa & Kobayashi	Pleistocene	Dainichi Formation	Japan	A barnacle belonging to the family Balanidae.	
Tubicinella nodai	Sp. nov	Valid	Karasawa & Kobayashi	Pleistocene	Shinzato Formation	Japan	A whale barnacle.	
Zeugmatolepas alifera	Sp. nov	Valid	Gale	Late Cretaceous (Campanian)		Sweden	A barnacle belonging to the family Zeugmatolepadidae.	
Zulloconcavus icenicus	Sp. nov	Valid	Gale	Pliocene	Coralline Crag Formation	United Kingdom		

==== Thecostracan research ====
- Cadena (2026) identifies borings produced by acrothoracican barnacles in a shell of the bivalve Ceratostreon boussingaulti from the Lower Cretaceous Rosablanca Formation (Colombia).

=== Other crustaceans ===
Name	Novelty	Status	Authors	Age	Type locality	Country	Notes	Images
Alsasuacaris dirkeysermansi	Sp. nov	Valid	Fraaije et al.	Late Cretaceous (Maastrichtian)	Maastricht Formation	Netherlands	A member of Cyclida.	
Laxitextella ovavecta	Sp. nov		Geyer & Sell	Late Triassic (Carnian)	Hassberge Formation	Germany	A clam shrimp.	
Laxitextella pusillogranulosa	Sp. nov		Geyer & Sell	Late Triassic (Carnian)	Hassberge Formation	Germany	A clam shrimp.	
Magnitocyclus trearnensis	Sp. nov		Clark, Hoare & Privitera Murdoch	Carboniferous (Viséan)	Hurlet Limestone	United Kingdom	A member of Cyclida.	
Shipingia bellershausenensis	Sp. nov		Geyer & Sell	Late Triassic (Carnian)	Grabfeld Formation	Germany	A clam shrimp.	
Weichangiops squamosus	Sp. nov	in press	Wang, Ren & Zhao	Early Cretaceous	Yixian Formation	China	A notostracan. Announced in late 2025; Officially published in February 2026	

==== Other crustacean research ====
- Gerbe, Zwanzig & Nützel (2026) study the composition of the Ordovician pentastomidan assemblage from the Öland island (Sweden), identifying two new morphotypes.
- Wang et al provide an detailed description update for Weichangiops trangularis Yang & Hong, 1980 based on new fossil materials. The new fossils allow for the discussion of early Notostraca evolutionary processes.

== Radiodonts ==
Name	Novelty	Status	Authors	Age	Type locality	Country	Notes	Images
Acanthopahvantia	Gen. et sp. nov	Valid	Lerosey-Aubril & Ortega-Hernández	Cambrian (Drumian)	Wheeler Shale	United States (Utah)	A hurdiid radiodont. Genus includes new species A. boardmani.	

=== Radiodont research ===
- Du et al. (2026) describe a specimen of Amplectobelua symbrachiata from the Cambrian Heilinpu Formation (Yunnan, China) with a healed injury on its swimming flap, interpreted as resulting from an attack of a predator (possibly a different radiodont or the lobopodian Omnidens).
- New isolated radiodont (possibly hurdiid) oral cones are described from the Ordovician Fezouata Formation (Morocco) by Potin et al. (2026), who propose a method for identification of affinities and feeding strategies of radiodonts on the basis of isolated oral cones.

== Trilobites ==
Name	Novelty	Status	Authors	Age	Type locality	Country	Notes	Images
Amphoriops chekabensis	Sp. nov		Ghobadi Pour & McCobb	Ordovician		Iran		
Bathyholcus punctatus	Sp. nov	Valid	Westrop, Eoff & Mayer	Cambrian	Shallow Bay Formation	Canada (Newfoundland and Labrador)		
Belgibole complanata	Sp. nov	Valid	Brezinski	Carboniferous (Tournaisian)	Madison Group	United States (Montana)		
Belgibole? madisonensis	Sp. nov	Valid	Brezinski	Carboniferous (Tournaisian)	Madison Group	United States (Montana)		
Bellaspidella crocalae	Sp. nov	Valid	Westrop, Eoff & Mayer	Cambrian	Shallow Bay Formation	Canada (Newfoundland and Labrador)	A member of the family Dokimocephalidae.	
Bohemilla xesta	Sp. nov	Valid	Ingham & Owen	Ordovician (Katian)		United Kingdom	Published online in 2026, but the issue date is listed as October 2025.	
Bollandia iugurtha	Sp. nov	Valid	Müller, Hahn & Becker	Carboniferous (Tournaisian)		Morocco		
Brachymetopus swimmingwomanensis	Sp. nov	Valid	Brezinski	Carboniferous (Tournaisian)	Madison Group	United States (Montana)		
Branikarges euanclarksoni	Sp. nov	Valid	Feist	Devonian (Emsian)	Izarne Formation	France	Published online in 2026, but the issue date is listed as October 2025.	
Brevibole iuba	Sp. nov	Valid	Müller, Hahn & Becker	Carboniferous (Tournaisian)		Morocco		
Brevibole numidiana	Sp. nov	Valid	Müller, Hahn & Becker	Carboniferous (Viséan)		Morocco		
Buttsia mala	Sp. nov	Valid	Varlamov & Makarova			Russia		
Ceeops	Gen. et sp. nov	Valid	Adrain	Ordovician (Tremadocian)	Fillmore Limestone	United States (Utah)	A trilobite of uncertain affinities. The type species is C. housensis.	
Ceratonurus janae	Sp. nov	Valid	Van Viersen & Müller	Devonian (Emsian)	Abadía Formation	Spain	A member of the family Odontopleuridae.	
Changqingia andersonorum	Sp. nov		Smith et al.	Cambrian Stage 4	Coonigan Formation	Australia		
Conocoryphe giordanobrunoi	Sp. nov	Valid	Geyer & Landing	Cambrian		Morocco		
Conocoryphe hassibrahimensis	Sp. nov	Valid	Geyer & Landing	Cambrian		Morocco		
Dadaops	Gen. et sp. nov	Valid	Van Viersen & Müller	Devonian (Emsian)	Abadía Formation	Spain	A member of the family Acastidae. Genus includes new species D. nubeiru.	
Dinesus shergoldi	Sp. nov		Smith et al.	Cambrian Stage 4	Coonigan Formation	Australia		
Dinesus whitehousei	Sp. nov		Smith et al.	Cambrian Stage 4	Coonigan Formation	Australia		
Dunderbergia astropletha	Sp. nov	Valid	Westrop, Eoff & Mayer	Cambrian	Shallow Bay Formation	Canada (Newfoundland and Labrador)	A member of the family Elviniidae.	
Dunderbergia bovicephala	Sp. nov	Valid	Westrop, Eoff & Mayer	Cambrian	Shallow Bay Formation	Canada (Newfoundland and Labrador)	A member of the family Elviniidae.	
Dunderbergia magnatubercula	Sp. nov	Valid	Westrop, Eoff & Mayer	Cambrian	Shallow Bay Formation	Canada (Newfoundland and Labrador)	A member of the family Elviniidae.	
Eoameura	Gen. et sp. nov	Valid	Brezinski	Carboniferous (Tournaisian)	Madison Group	United States (Montana)	Genus includes new species E. kollari.	
Eoapatokephalus antiquus	Sp. nov	Valid	Varlamov & Makarova			Russia		
"Eugonocare" arquatum	Sp. nov	Valid	Westrop, Eoff & Mayer	Cambrian	Shallow Bay Formation	Canada (Newfoundland and Labrador)	A member of the family Aphelaspididae.	
Gandlops apateon	Sp. nov	Valid	Van Viersen & Müller	Devonian (Emsian)	Abadía Formation	Spain	A member of the family Acastidae.	
Glyptometopsis parilimba	Sp. nov	Valid	Westrop, Eoff & Mayer	Cambrian	Shallow Bay Formation	Canada (Newfoundland and Labrador)	A member of the family Dokimocephalidae.	
Granolenus rinconadensis	Sp. nov	Valid	Liñán and Gozalo in Gozalo et al.	Cambrian	Tamames Sandstone Formation	Spain	A member of Redlichiida belonging to the family Dolerolenidae.	
Hebediscus carlsi	Sp. nov		Sepúlveda et al.	Cambrian		Spain		
Hollardops granulosus	Sp. nov	Valid	Van Viersen & Müller	Devonian (Emsian)	Abadía Formation	Spain	A member of the family Acastidae.	
Jimlochaspis	Gen. et sp. et comb. nov		Adrain & Pérez-Peris	Ordovician	Fillmore Limestone	Greenland; United States (Utah)	A member of the family Bathyuridae. The type species is J. copei; genus also includes "Goniurus" boggildi Poulsen (1927).	
Kingstonia phalacra	Sp. nov	Valid	Westrop, Dengler & Cuggy	Cambrian	Grosses-Roches Formation	Canada (Quebec)		
Kingstonia sicaria	Sp. nov	Valid	Westrop, Dengler & Cuggy	Cambrian	DuNoir Limestone	United States (Wyoming)		
Koldinia arealica	Sp. nov	Valid	Varlamov & Makarova			Russia		
Koldiniura	Gen. et comb. nov	Valid	Varlamov & Makarova			Russia	Genus includes "Koldiniella" prolixa Lazarenko (1968).	
Koneprusia davidi	Sp. nov	Valid	Van Viersen & Müller	Devonian (Emsian)	Abadía Formation	Spain	A member of the family Odontopleuridae.	
Latibole budili	Sp. nov	Valid	Müller, Hahn & Becker	Carboniferous (Tournaisian)		Morocco		
Leonaspis columnaris	Sp. nov	Valid	Van Viersen & Müller	Devonian (Emsian)	Abadía Formation	Spain	A member of the family Odontopleuridae.	
Leonaspis defargesi	Sp. nov	Valid	Van Viersen & Müller	Devonian (Emsian)	Abadía Formation	Spain	A member of the family Odontopleuridae.	
Leonaspis muricata	Sp. nov	Valid	Van Viersen & Müller	Devonian (Emsian)	Abadía Formation	Spain	A member of the family Odontopleuridae.	
Leonaspis pachyacantha	Sp. nov	Valid	Van Viersen & Müller	Devonian (Emsian)	Abadía Formation	Spain	A member of the family Odontopleuridae.	
Liobole massinissa	Sp. nov	Valid	Müller, Hahn & Becker	Carboniferous (Tournaisian)		Morocco		
Liobolina montanaensis	Sp. nov	Valid	Brezinski	Carboniferous (Tournaisian)	Madison Group	United States (Montana)		
Lioharpes felipei	Sp. nov	Valid	Van Viersen & Müller	Devonian (Emsian)	Abadía Formation	Spain	A member of the family Harpetidae.	
Olenoides lawrenceorum	Sp. nov		Smith et al.	Cambrian Stage 4	Coonigan Formation	Australia		
Olenoides percivali	Sp. nov		Smith et al.	Cambrian Stage 4	Coonigan Formation	Australia		
Omegops armeniensis	Sp. nov	Valid	Crônier et al.	Devonian (Famennian)		Armenia	Published online in 2026, but the issue date is listed as October 2025.	
Omegops paucilenticulatus	Sp. nov	Valid	Crônier & Mottequin	Devonian (Famennian)	Étrœungt Formation	France		
Onaraspis cymbricensis	Sp. nov		Smith et al.	Cambrian Stage 4	Coonigan Formation	Australia		
Onchocephalus? warrisi	Sp. nov		Smith et al.	Cambrian Stage 4	Coonigan Formation	Australia		
Onchopeltis anconis	Sp. nov	Valid	Westrop, Eoff & Mayer	Cambrian	Shallow Bay Formation	Canada (Newfoundland and Labrador)	A member of the family Dokimocephalidae.	
Panibole begaaensis	Sp. nov	Valid	Müller, Hahn & Becker	Carboniferous (Tournaisian)		Morocco		
Perexigupyge angusticapitalis	Sp. nov	Valid	Brezinski	Carboniferous (Tournaisian)	Madison Group	United States (Montana)		
Perunaspis pachyprymna	Sp. nov	Valid	Van Viersen & Müller	Devonian (Emsian)	Abadía Formation	Spain	A member of the family Lichidae.	
Phillibole? acutis	Sp. nov	Valid	Brezinski	Carboniferous (Tournaisian)	Madison Group	United States (Montana)		
Piltonia douglassi	Sp. nov	Valid	Brezinski	Carboniferous (Tournaisian)	Madison Group	United States (Montana)		
Piltonia sandoi	Sp. nov	Valid	Brezinski	Carboniferous (Tournaisian)	Madison Group	United States (Montana)		
Proetides raymondi	Sp. nov	Valid	Brezinski	Carboniferous (Tournaisian)	Madison Group	United States (Montana)		
Proetus frankei	Sp. nov	Valid	Basse & Schöning	Silurian		Sweden		
Proetus gotlandensis	Sp. nov	Valid	Basse & Schöning	Silurian		Sweden		
Proetus nebenkruegerorum	Sp. nov	Valid	Basse & Schöning	Silurian		Germany		
Proetus sellinianus	Sp. nov	Valid	Basse & Schöning	Silurian		Germany		
Pseudokotuia	Gen. et sp. nov	Valid	Ren et al.	Cambrian (Paibian)	Chaumitien Formation	China	A member of the family Anomocaridae. Genus includes new species P. quadrata. The final version of the article naming it was published online in 2026, but the issue date is listed as December 2025.	
Pteraspis planus	Sp. nov	Valid	Varlamov & Makarova			Russia	A member of Asaphida belonging to the family Pterocephaliidae.	
Pulcherproetus inexspectatus damsdorfensis	Ssp. nov	Valid	Basse & Schöning	Silurian		Germany		
Pulcherproetus rudolphi	Sp. nov	Valid	Basse & Schöning	Silurian		Germany		
Pulchricapitus xenos	Sp. nov		Smith et al.	Cambrian (Furongian)		Australia		
Radiantospina	Gen. et sp. nov	Valid	Pérez-Peris in Pérez-Peris et al.	Ordovician (Tremadocian)	Fezouata Formation	Morocco	A member of the family Cheiruridae. The type species is R. helioaspis.	
Redlichia holmesi	Sp. nov		Smith et al.	Cambrian Stage 4	Coonigan Formation	Australia		
Rhyncholamproetus	Gen. et comb. nov	Valid	Van Viersen & Müller	Devonian (Emsian to Eifelian)		Morocco	A member of Proetida. The type species is "Cornuproetus (Diademaproetus)" antatlasius Alberti (1969).	
Serrania carlsi	Sp. nov	Valid	Liñán and Gozalo in Gozalo et al.	Cambrian	Tamames Sandstone Formation	Spain	A member of Redlichiida belonging to the family Bigotinidae.	
Signatoproetus leviconvexus	Sp. nov	Valid	Basse & Schöning	Silurian		Germany		
Signatoproetus muelleri	Sp. nov	Valid	Basse & Schöning	Silurian		Sweden		
Smoothcanyonops	Gen. et 2 sp. nov	Valid	Adrain	Ordovician (Tremadocian)	Fillmore Limestone	United States (Utah)	A trilobite of uncertain affinities. The type species is S. smoothcanyonensis; genus also includes S. middlensis.	
Solenoparia gnaltaensis	Sp. nov		Smith et al.	Cambrian Stage 4	Coonigan Formation	Australia		
Thigriffides? andersoni	Sp. nov	Valid	Brezinski	Carboniferous (Tournaisian)	Madison Group	United States (Montana)		
Tholifrons maritima	Sp. nov	Valid	Westrop, Eoff & Mayer	Cambrian	Shallow Bay Formation	Canada (Newfoundland and Labrador)		
Torifera intermedia	Sp. nov	Valid	Yuan, Ren & Gao in Yuan et al.	Cambrian (Guzhangian)	Changhia Formation	China	A member of Ptychopariida belonging to the family Diceratocephalidae.	
Tropidocoryphe acanthonota	Sp. nov	Valid	Van Viersen & Müller	Devonian (Emsian)	Abadía Formation	Spain	A member of the family Tropidocoryphidae.	
Wenlowiproetus	Gen. et 5 sp. et comb. et ssp. nov	Valid	Basse & Schöning	Silurian		Germany; Poland; Ukraine; Estonia?	The type species is W. ruegenianus; genus also includes new species W. glaciportans, W. hiddenseeensis, W. lupus and W. polonicus, as well as W. erraticus (including new subspecies W. erraticus sueselensis).	
Wongia laevigata	Sp. nov	Valid	Yuan in Yuan et al.	Cambrian (Guzhangian)	Kushan Formation	China	A member of Ptychopariida belonging to the family Diceratocephalidae.	
Wongia nanzhaocunensis	Sp. nov	Valid	Yuan in Yuan et al.	Cambrian (Guzhangian)	Changhia Formation	China	A member of Ptychopariida belonging to the family Diceratocephalidae.	
Xingrenaspis krusei	Sp. nov		Smith et al.	Cambrian Stage 4	Coonigan Formation	Australia		

=== Trilobite research ===
- Evidence supporting the interpretation of trilobite exopodites as having respiratory function is presented by Losso et al. (2026).
- A study on the evolution of the morphological diversity of cephala and pygidia in Cambrian and Ordovician trilobites is published by Suárez & Esteve (2026).
- Collantes et al. (2026) reconstruct the ventral anatomy of Yunnanocephalus yunnanensis, reporting evidence of preservation of uniramous antennae and a series of cephalic and thoracic appendages in the studied fossil material.
- New information on the soft tissue anatomy of Palaeolenus douvillei is provided by Zhang & Liu (2026).
- A study on changes in the morphology of Kaotaia globosa during its life history is published by Chen et al. (2026).
- Dai, Zhang & Peng (2026) study changes in the morphology of Maotunia iddingsi during its life history and their intraspecific variation.
- Tortello et al. (2026) study the composition of two trilobite assemblages from the Umachiri Inlier of the Peruvian Altiplano, providing evidence of presence of cosmopolitan taxa in the Cambrian Llallahue Formation and presence of taxa with Gondwanan affinities in the Ordovician Umachiri Formation.
- Evidence of preservation of remains of the digestive system is reported in specimens of Ptychoparioides henkli from the Cambrian Buchava Formation (Czech Republic) by Fatka, Budil & Micka (2026).
- Zhu (2026) reports the discovery of an internal mold of Archikainella vomerinus from the Cambrian (Furongian) Sandu Formation (China), providing new information on the ventral structure of lichakephalid trilobites.
- Beech et al. (2026) evaluate possible functions of cephalic brims of trilobites of the order Harpetida and the superfamily Trinucleioidea, finding no evidence that the brims were an adaptation that prevented sinking into soft sediments, and finding no evidence of clear evolutionary trend in the evolution of the brims that would make them more efficient at ploughing through sediments.
- Vargas-Parra & Hopkins (2026) report evidence of decrease of modularity of the head Lonchodomas chaziensis across its metamorphosis from three to two modules, and evidence of mosaic shifts in shape and degree of integration of modules before and during metamorphosis.
- Mahata & Pates (2026) revise the fossil record of abnormalities in specimens of Paradoxides davidis, and interpret the studied abnormalities as more likely resulting from injuries than from developmental aberrations.
- A study on changes of geographical distribution of olenid trilobites throughout their evolutionary history, and on factors influencing their expansion and eventual decline, is published by Monti & Serra (2026).
- Evidence from the study of the spatio-temporal distribution of trilobites during the Ordovician-Silurian transition, indicating that trilobites began to recover immediately following the second episode of the Late Ordovician mass extinction, is presented by Wei et al. (2026).
- Possible evidence of pelagic lifestyle of Deiphon is presented by Losso & Pates (2026).
- A study on the phylogenetic relationships of members of the family Homalonotidae is published by Martins et al. (2026).
- Trenchard, Brett & Perc (2026) interpret trident-like cephalic projections of Walliserops as structures that might have facilitated hydrodynamic drafting and positional stabilization of the studied trilobites while they moved in groups.
- New information on the morphological variability in Acanthopyge haueri is provided by Budil et al. (2026).
- Bel Haouz et al. (2026) report the discovery of a diverse assemblage of trace fossils from the Devonian (Famennian) strata of the Aoufilal Formation (Morocco) dominated by trilobite traces, preserving evidence of gregarious behavior of trilobites and possible evidence of tracemaker of Diplichnites gouldi stalking producers of other traces, and name a new ichnotaxon Rusophycus antiatlasensis.
- Jordan-Burmeister (2026) reconstructs changes of connectivity of proetid trilobite assemblages from different regions in the time interval from the Devonian (Famennian) to the end of the Carboniferous.
- Kudo & Shiino (2026) study the taphonomy of fossils of members of the genus Pseudophillipsia from the Permian Kamiyasse Formation (Japan), interpreted as indicative of adaptations of the two studied species to different benthic conditions.
- Bicknell et al. (2026) revise the record of trilobite specimens with malformations from the collections of the Yale Peabody Museum.

== Other arthropods ==
Name	Novelty	Status	Authors	Age	Type locality	Country	Notes	Images
Atropicaris sinensis	Sp. nov		Zhao & Hu in Zhao et al.	Middle Triassic	Guanling Formation	China	A member of Thylacocephala.	
Cassicaris	Gen. et sp. nov	Valid	Guo et al.	Cambrian	Hongjingshao Formation	China	A bivalved arthropod belonging to the group Odaraiida and the family Pectocarididae. The type species is C. clarksoni. Published online in 2026, but the issue date is listed as October 2025.	
Cretohenicops	Gen. et sp. nov	Valid	Hu, Jin & Di	Cretaceous	Kachin amber	Myanmar	A centipede belonging to the family Henicopidae. Genus includes new species C. calcaratus.	
Cryptops leachi	Sp. nov	Valid	Mao & Di	Mid-Cretaceous		Myanmar	A centipede.	
Dalocarinatus	Gen. et 2 sp. nov		Le Cadre et al.	Late Cretaceous (Cenomanian)	Kachin amber	Myanmar	A millipede belonging to the family Dalodesmidae. The type species is D. luxuriosus; genus also includes D. inopinatus.	
Dianhaia	Gen. et sp. nov	Valid	Zhu et al.	Cambrian Stage 3	Yu'anshan Formation	China	A member of the family Helmetiidae. The type species is D. heptacantha.	
Eoanajapyx	Gen. et sp. nov		Wang et al.	Cretaceous		Myanmar	A member of Diplura belonging to the family Anajapygidae. Genus includes new species E. yinae.	
Ffabach	Gen. et sp. nov	Valid	Pates et al.	Ordovician (Darriwilian)	Gilwern Volcanic Formation	United Kingdom	A bivalved arthropod of uncertain affinities. The type species is F. peryglus.	
Gloynia	Gen. et sp. nov	Valid	Pates et al.	Ordovician (Darriwilian)	Gilwern Volcanic Formation	United Kingdom	A bivalved arthropod of uncertain affinities. The type species is G. jonesi.	
Isoxys? giganteus	Sp. nov	Valid	Yoshino & Oji	Ordovician	Fezouata Formation	Morocco		
Oreinorema	Gen. et sp. nov	Valid	Liu et al.	Cambrian		China	An arthropod with a morphology intermediate between those seen in radiodonts and in upper stem-group euarthropods. Genus includes new species O. bergstroemi.	
Ovalicaris	Gen. et sp. nov	Valid	Laville & Schädel	Late Jurassic (Tithonian)	Altmühltal Formation	Germany	A member of Thylacocephala. The type species is O. wulforum.	
Quadrangulucaris	Gen. et comb. et sp. nov	Valid	Laville & Bicknell	Carboniferous	Mazon Creek fossil beds	United States (Illinois; Iowa)	A member of Thylacocephala. The type species is "Concavicaris" georgeorum Schram (1990); genus also includes new species Q. rostellata.	
Rotundaparma	Gen. et comb. nov	Valid	Laville & Bicknell	Carboniferous	Linton Formation	United States (Illinois; Montana)	A member of Thylacocephala. The type species is "Ceratiocaris" sinuatus Meek & Worthen (1868).	
Sinojapyx	Gen. et sp. nov	Valid	Wang et al.	Middle Jurassic	Daohugou Beds	China	A member of Diplura belonging to the group Japygoidea. The type species is S. giganteus.	
Soomaspis labutai	Sp. nov	Valid	Laibl et al.	Ordovician (Katian)	Králův Dvůr Formation	Czech Republic	A member of the family Naraoiidae.	
Sunella chimera	Sp. nov	Valid	Zhai et al.	Cambrian Stage 3	Yu'anshan Formation	China	Possibly a member of Pancrustacea related to ostracods or to the clade including Ostracoda and Leptostraca; a member of the family Sunellidae.	
Sunella dimorphismus	Sp. nov	Nomen nudum	Liu et al.	Cambrian Stage 3	Helinpu Formation	China	Initially being described as a basal arthropod of the family Sunellidae. Later considered invalid and conspecific with S. chimera by Zhai et al. 2026	
Triangulusinus	Gen. et sp. nov	Valid	Laville & Bicknell	Carboniferous	Linton Formation	United States (Indiana)	A member of Thylacocephala. The type species is T. pustulosus.	
Tuzoia isuelaensis	Sp. nov	In press	Izquierdo-López et al.	Cambrian; Cambrian Stage 4 - Drumian		Spain	A non-trilobite arthropod. Announced in late 2025; Officially published in February 2026	
Tuzoia wudangshanensis	Sp. nov		Sun, Zeng & Zhao	Cambrian		China		
Waukartus	Gen. et sp. nov	Valid	Briggs et al.	Silurian	Brandon Bridge Formation	United States (Wisconsin)	A stem myriapod. The type species is W. muscularis.	

- Purported bradoriid "Liangshanella" qassutit is reinterpreted as a phosphatocopid and transferred to the genus Comleyopsis by Streng & Peel (2026).
- Evidence from the study of the anatomy of Zonozoe drabowiensis and Zonoscutum solum, interpreted as supporting their placement within Artiopoda and strengthening the case for a their affinity with Vicissicaudata, is presented by Lustri et al. (2026).
- Yang et al. (2026) provide new information on the morphology of Acanthomeridion serratum and study its phylogenetic affinities, recovering it as a member of Vicissicaudata closely related to Sidneyia.
- Liu et al. (2026) reassess the anatomy and affinities of purported trilobite Xiyuaspis on the basis of the study of the original fossil material and new fossil material from the Cambrian Guozigou Formation (China), providing evidence of affinities of Xiyuaspis with Aglaspidida and interpreting as a possible senior synonym of Quasimodaspis.
- Mai et al. (2026) revise Pisinnocaris subconigera and interpret it as a valid, distinct taxon within Fuxianhuiida.
- Le Cadre et al. (2026) study the fossil record of polyxenid and synxenid millipedes, reporting evidence of increase of their body size Cretaceous to the Eocene, and its subsequent decrease.
- Long et al. (2026) revise the morphology and affinities of Rhyniognatha hirsti, finding no evidence confidently supporting its placement within insect crown group.

== General research ==
- Baucon et al. (2026) interpret trace fossils assigned to the ichnogenus Paleodictyon as most likely produced by marine arthropods.
- Izquierdo-López, Jiao & Pates (2026) describe rake-like appendages from the Cambrian Wulongqing Formation (Yunnan, China) interpreted as belonging to a previously unknown suspension-feeding arthropod and review known diversity of suspension-feeding arthropods, identifying two functional groups from Cambrian and Ordovician that lack modern representatives.
- Daley et al. (2026) describe new arthropod material from the Ordovician Cabrières Biota (France), refute purported evidence of presence of phyllocarids in the Cabrières Biota, and interpret the studied arthropod assemblage as including trilobites, a probable member of Aglaspidida and a possible member of Chasmataspidida and spiny appendage fragments.
- A specimen of the large trilobite species Arctinurus boltoni with indentations interpreted as evidence of a failed predation by a eurypterid is described from the Silurian Rochester Shale (United States) by Bicknell et al. (2026).
- Lakeram et al. (2026) describe borings in a coal ball from the Carboniferous strata from the Mt. Rorah Coal Member of the Tradewater Formation (Illinois, United States), interpreted as produced by arthropods (possibly roachoid insects or millipedes) feeding on the roots of Psaronius, and report preservation of two types of arthropod-produced coprolites in the studied borings, including smaller pellets possibly produced by oribatid mites feeding on larger pellets.
- Review of progress in the study of relationships and evolution of Cambrian euarthropods from the preceding years is published by Ortega-Hernández (2026).
