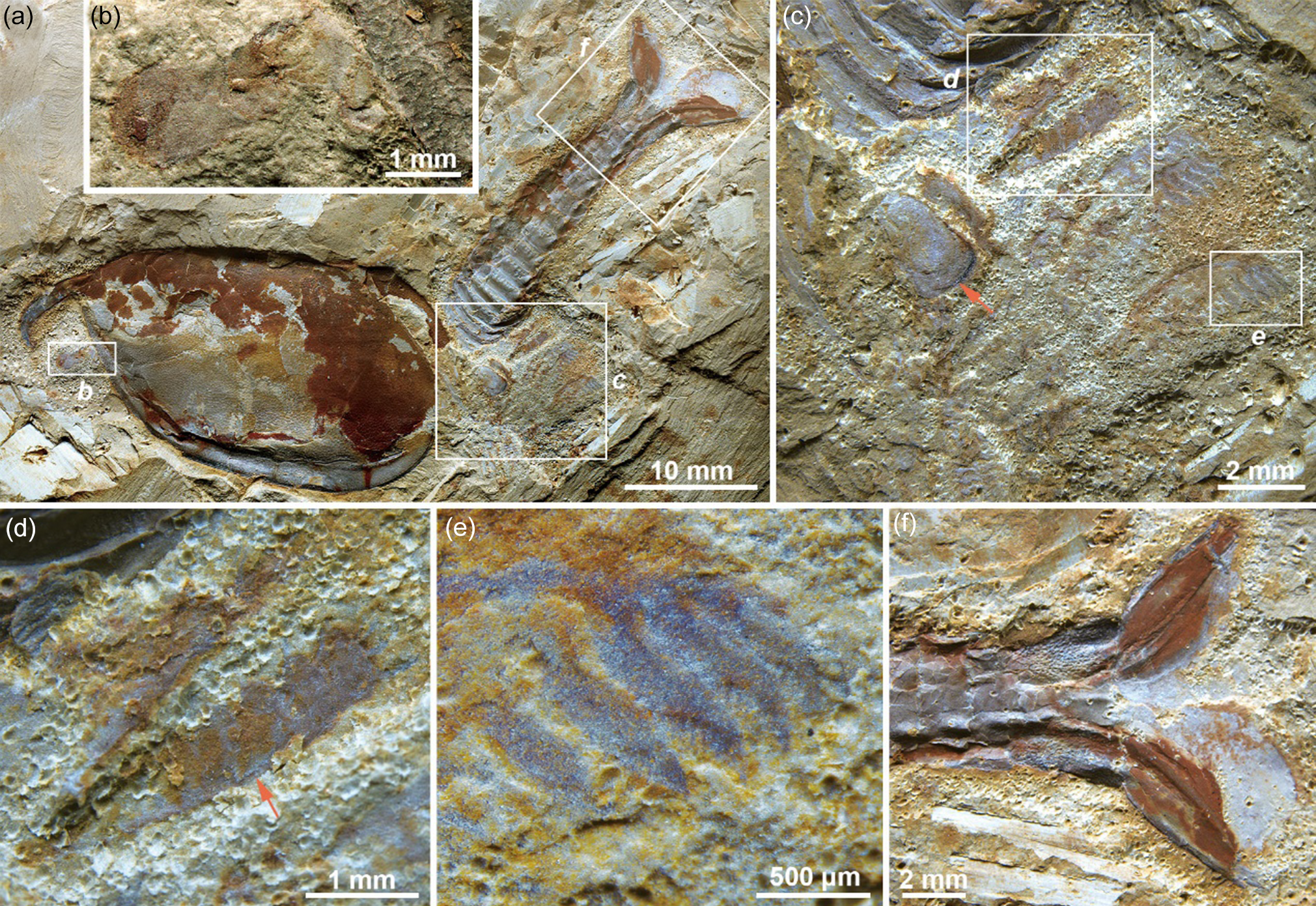
- Holotype specimen

Scientific classification
- Kingdom: Animalia
- Phylum: Arthropoda
- Order: †Hymenocarina
- Family: †Pectocarididae
- Genus: †Cassicaris; Guo et al., 2026
- Species: †C. clarksoni

Binomial name
- †Cassicaris clarksoni Guo et al., 2026

= Cassicaris =

Cassicaris Temporal range: Cambrian Stage 3

Genus of extinct arthropod

Cassicaris (lit. 'shield shrimp') is an extinct genus of pancrustacean arthropod in the family Pectocarididae, known from the Cambrian (Stage 3) Hongjingshao Formation of China. The genus contains a single species, Cassicaris clarksoni, known from several well-preserved specimens. It is characterized by its heavily armoured abdomen, which is covered in ridges and spines.

== Discovery and naming ==
The Cassicaris fossil material was discovered in outcrops of the Hongjingshao Formation (Xiaoshiba biota) in Kunming, Yunnan Province, China. These rock layers are assigned to the Yunnanocephalus–Chengjiangaspis–Hongshiyanaspis trilobite biozone. The known specimens, including 15 partial individuals preserving soft parts, are housed in the collections of the Institute of Palaeontology at Yunnan University, where they are permanently accessioned as specimens YKLP 12493 through 12507.

In 2026, Qing-Hao Guo and colleagues described Cassicaris clarksoni as a new genus and species of pectocaridid euarthropod based on these fossil remains, establishing YKLP 12493 as the holotype specimen. The generic name, Cassicaris, combines the Latin words cas, meaning 'shield', in reference to the morphology of the shell over its head region, and cari, meaning 'shrimp'. The specific name, clarksoni, honours British palaeontologist Euan N. K. Clarkson and his research on fossil arthropod vision.

== Description ==
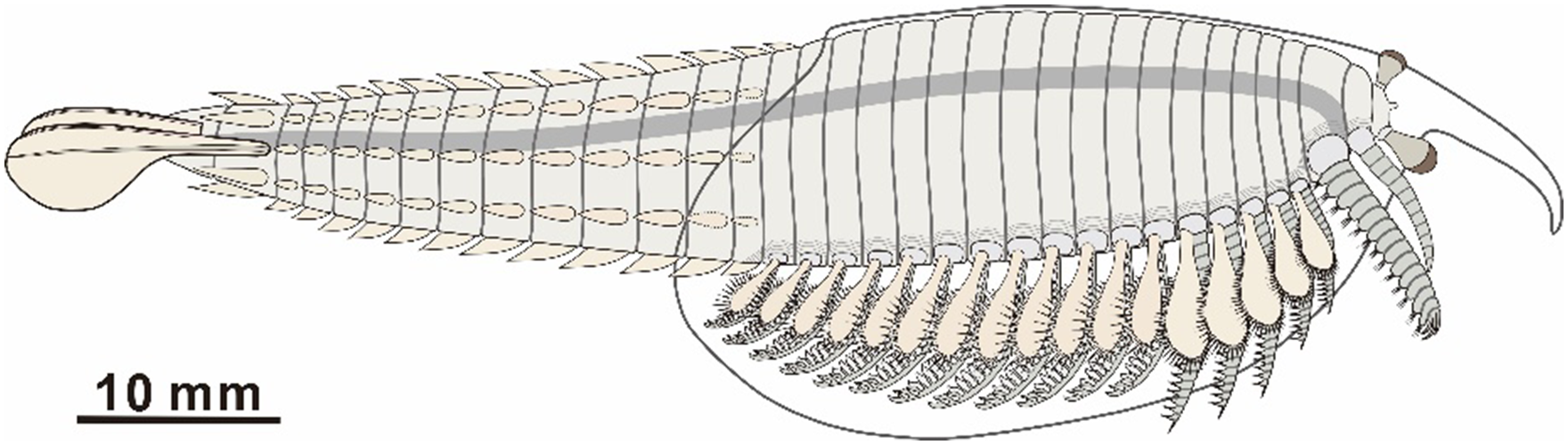
Reconstruction of C. clarksoni

The body segments (somites) of Cassicaris are grouped under the following sections (tagma): cephalon (head), thorax, abdomen, and a non-segmental tail (telson). The cephalon and thorax are covered by a sub-elliptical bivalved carapace. The carapace measured up to 35 millimetres (1.4 in), excluding the anterior spine. Underneath the spine are a pair of stalked compound eyes, an anterior sclerite, and a median eye at the middle of the anterior sclerite. Behind the eyes are two pairs of antennae-like appendages, referred to as antennulae and antennae (first and second antennae) respectively. The antennulae are small, while the antennae are robust and spiny. Mouthparts such as mandibles are unknown. The succeeding head segments carried five pairs of biramous (two-branched) limbs, each formed by a 10-segmented endopod (leg-like inner branch) and paddle-like exopod (outer branch). The 12 to 13 pairs of thoracic limbs are also biramous, but the exopods are smaller, and each endopod segment carries a claw-shaped endite, which itself is fringed by fine setae. The remaining 10 to 13 body segments form the exposed, limbless abdomen, which is highly armoured and carries rows of distinctive ridges and spines. The telson terminates with a pair of leaf-like furcal rami.

== Paleoecology ==
Cassicaris may have been an epibenthic suspension feeder, using its biramous limbs to swim and capture tiny zooplankton near the seafloor. The multidirectional vision and armoured abdomen may have provided a defensive function against potential predators.

== Classification ==
To test the affinities and relationships of Cassicaris, Guo et al. (2026) included it in an updated version of the phylogenetic matrix of Jin et al. (2021). They recovered it as the sister taxon to Pectocaris inopinata, with this clade forming an unresolved polytomy with Pectocaris eurypetala, P. spatiosa, and Jugatacaris agilis. These taxa form the family Pectocarididae. These species all share a bivalved carapace, stalked eyes in a pair, a body with multiple segments, and trunk appendages with many podomeres and a slender morphology. In relation to these species, Cassicaris has fewer body segments and fewer associated limbs. It also has a more sclerotized abdomen with distinctive spine rows. The results of the phylogenetic analysis of Guo et al. are displayed in the cladogram below:

- - Radiodonta
  - - Opabinia regalis
    - - Surusicaris elegans
      - Isoxys spp.
      - - Nereocaris spp.
        - - Chuandianella ovata
          - - Megacheira
            - Fuxianhuiida
          - Hymenocarina
            - - Odaraia alata
              - Pectocarididae
                - Pectocaris eurypetala
                - Pectocaris spatiosa
                - Jugatacaris agilis
                - - Cassicaris clarksoni
                  - Pectocaris inopinata
            - - Canadaspis laevigata
              - Protocaris marshi
              - - Tuzoia retifera
                - - Branchiocaris pretiosa
                  - Tokummia katalepsis
              - - Canadaspis perfecta
                - - Perspicaris dictynna
                  - - Perspicaris recondita
                    - Loricicaris spinocaudatus
