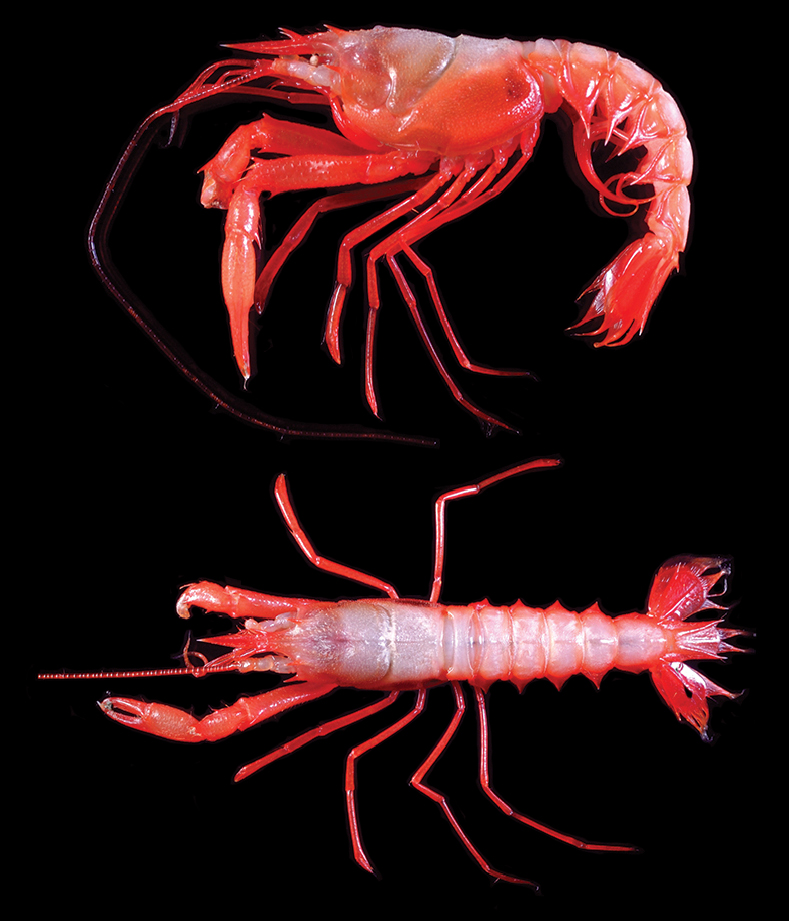
- A specimen of N. acanthura

Scientific classification
- Kingdom: Animalia
- Phylum: Arthropoda
- Clade: Pancrustacea
- Class: Malacostraca
- Order: Decapoda
- Suborder: Pleocyemata
- Family: Nephropidae
- Genus: Nephropsis
- Species: N. acanthura

Binomial name
- Nephropsis acanthura Macpherson, 1990 - animal

= Nephropsis acanthura =

Species of crustacean

Nephropsis acanthura, also known as the spinetail lobsterette, is a species of lobster in the genus Nephropsis. It grows up to 3 cm in length.

== Distribution ==
N. acanthura is found in the Indo-West Pacific region, in the deep sea between 850 and 1250 meters.
