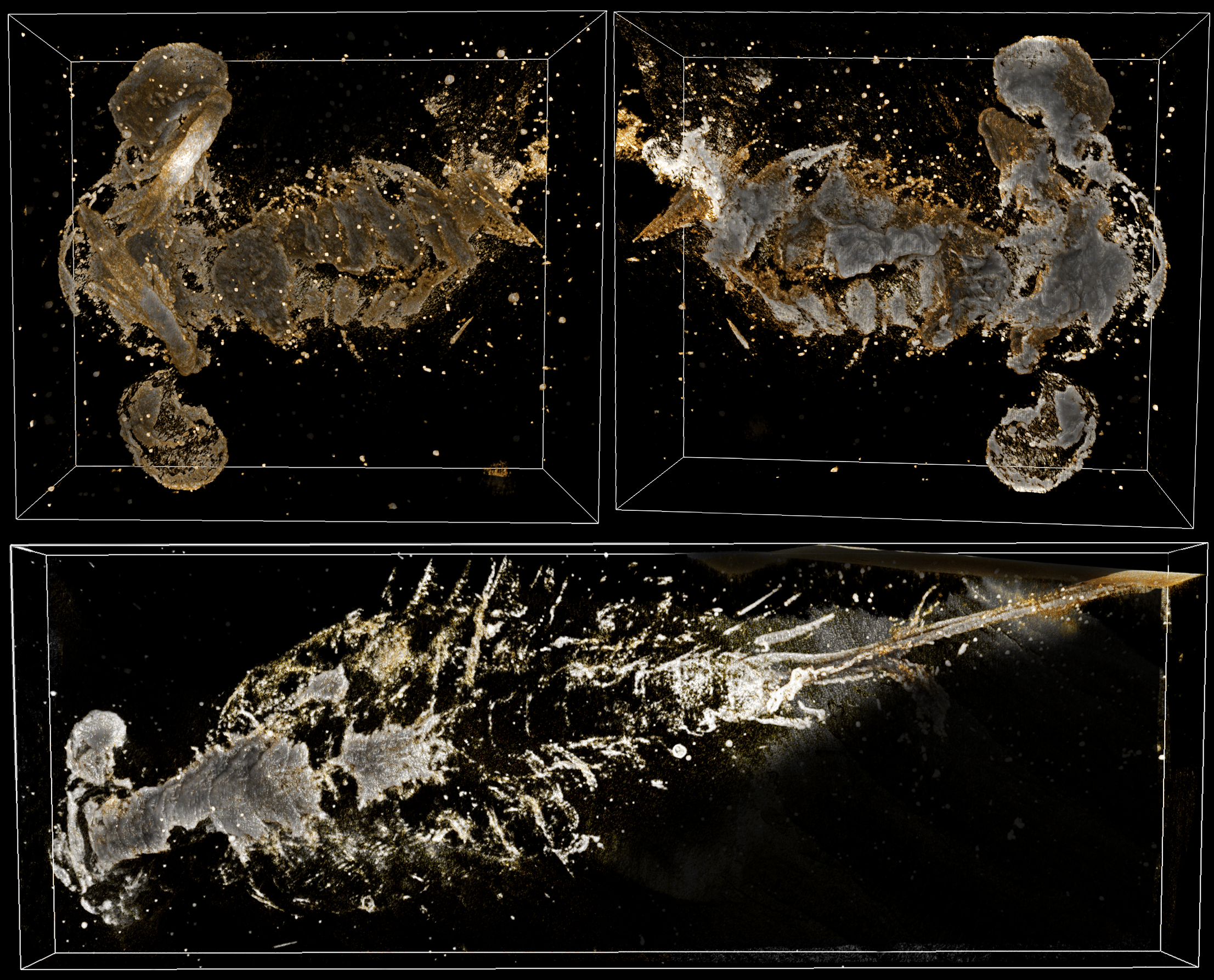
- Micro-CT scan of the holotype of Oreinorema bergstroemi
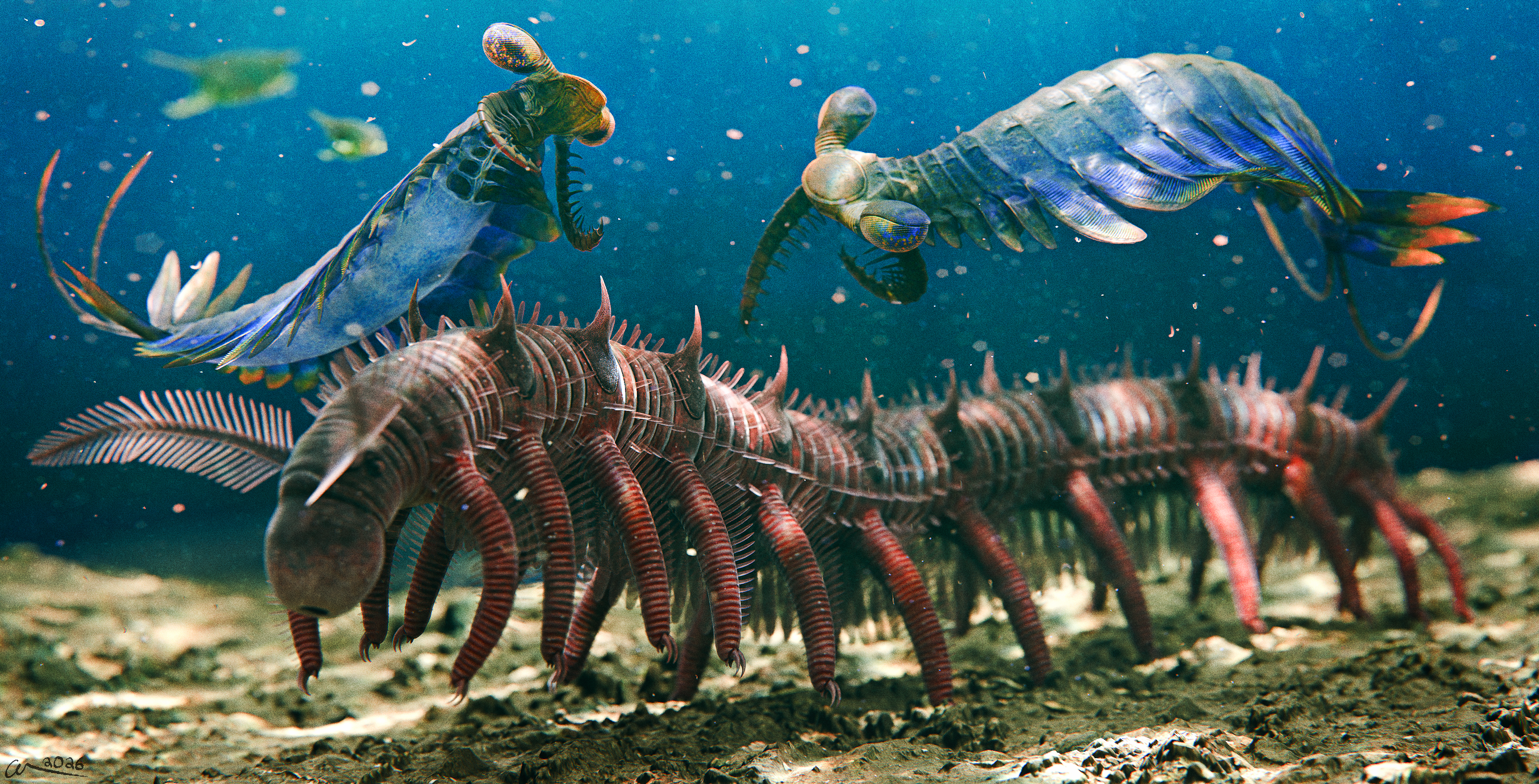
- A pair of Oreinorema bergstroemi, alongside the armoured lobopodian Onychodictyon.

Scientific classification
- Kingdom: Animalia
- Phylum: Arthropoda
- Genus: †Oreinorema; Liu et al., 2026
- Species: †O. bergstroemi

Binomial name
- †Oreinorema bergstroemi Liu et al., 2026

= Oreinorema =

Oreinorema Temporal range: Cambrian Stage 3

Genus of extinct arthropod

Oreinorema is an extinct genus of arthropod known from the Cambrian (Stage 3) Chengjiang biota of China. The genus contains a single species, Oreinorema bergstroemi, known from a single specimen preserved as a slab and counterslab. It is either transitional between the more basal radiodonts and later-diverging Euarthropoda, the group containing modern arthropods, or a true radiodont.

== Discovery and naming ==
Oreinorema is known from one specimen, YKLP 17216, discovered in the Yu'anshan Formation of Yunnan Province, China.

Both the generic and specific names are in honor of paleontologist Jan Bergström. The generic name comes from the Greek oreinos, meaning "mountainous", and rheuma, meaning "stream", in reference to the meaning of Bergström.

== Description ==
The single known specimen of Oreinorema measures 3.7 cm (around 1.46 in) in length.

Oreinorema's head consists of two segments. The eyes are borne on stalks and connected by a bar located below the anterior sclerite. Oreinorema has radiodont-like frontal appendages with 11 distal podomeres, each bearing paired endites. Although otherwise similar to radiodont frontal appendages, they are oriented dorsally and are placed on a separate segment located behind the segment bearing the eyes. In place of an oral cone (as would be seen in a radiodont), Oreinorema bears a plate known as a hypostome.

The neck and trunk regions are composed of 4 and 12 segments, respectively, each bearing paired flaps and dorsal setal blades. The dorsal body segments are sclerotized and lined by a pair of ridges. The tail region comprises three pairs of flaps and a pair of long caudal rami.

Oreinorema's morphology combines traits typical of radiodonts with traits typical of more derived euarthropods. Features like the anterior sclerite, frontal appendages, stalked eyes, and paired flaps are all shared with radiodonts, and the overall anatomy is very similar to Innovatiocaris. Meanwhile, the hypostome, orientation and location of the frontal appendages, and sclerotization of the body segments all recall more derived taxa.

== Taxonomy ==
Phylogenetic analysis and anatomical comparisons suggest that Oreinorema is more derived than radiodonts, but still basal relative to upper stem-group euarthropod taxa like isoxyids, Kylinxia, and megacheirans. Under parsimony analysis however, Oreinorema is nested within Radiodonta and is a sister taxon to Innovatiocaris.

== Paleobiology ==
The tips of the endites in the only known specimen are in contact with one another, perhaps suggesting that this specimen was preserved while the animal was capturing prey or feeding. Oreinorema would have captured prey and fed using its frontal appendages and hypostome.
