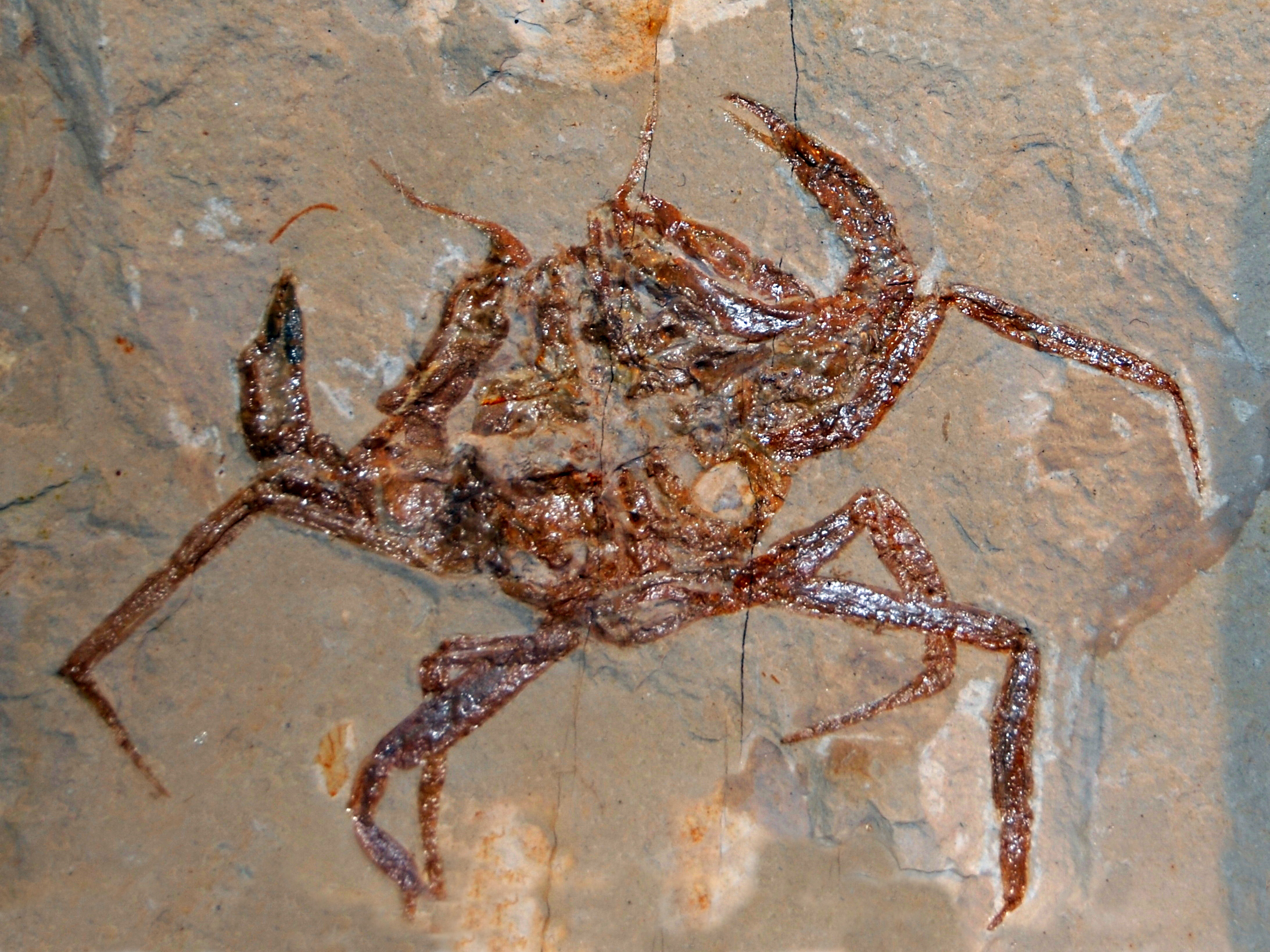
- Corazzatocarcinus hadjoulae

Scientific classification
- Kingdom: Animalia
- Phylum: Arthropoda
- Class: Malacostraca
- Order: Decapoda
- Suborder: Pleocyemata
- Infraorder: Brachyura
- Family: †Necrocarcinidae
- Genus: †Corazzatocarcinus; Larghi, 2004

= Corazzatocarcinus =

Corazzatocarcinus Temporal range: Cretaceous

Extinct genus of crabs

Corazzatocarcinus is an extinct genus of Cretaceous crabs. This genus include the species Corazzatocarcinus hadjoulae Roger 1946.

== Fossil record ==
Corazzatocarcinus is known in Cretaceous of Lebanon (from about 99.7 to 94.3 million years ago).
