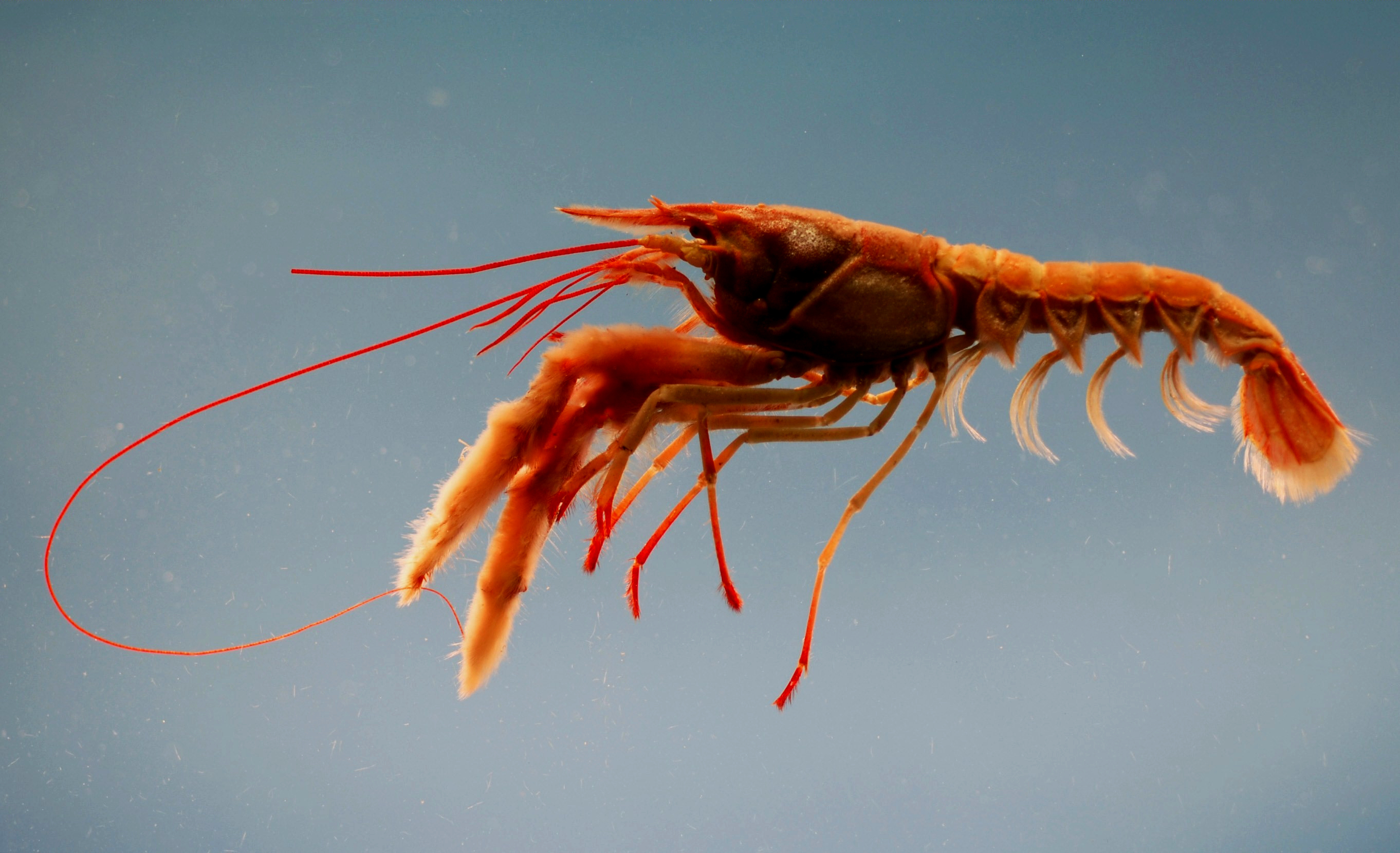
- Nephropsis rosea

Scientific classification
- Kingdom: Animalia
- Phylum: Arthropoda
- Clade: Pancrustacea
- Class: Malacostraca
- Order: Decapoda
- Suborder: Pleocyemata
- Family: Nephropidae
- Genus: Nephropsis; Wood-Mason, 1872

Type species
- Nephropsis stewarti Wood-Mason, 1872

= Nephropsis =

Genus of lobsters

Nephropsis is a genus of lobsters containing 18 extant species:

== Species ==
- Nephropsis acanthura Macpherson, 1990
- Nephropsis aculeata Smith, 1881
- Nephropsis agassizii A. Milne-Edwards, 1880

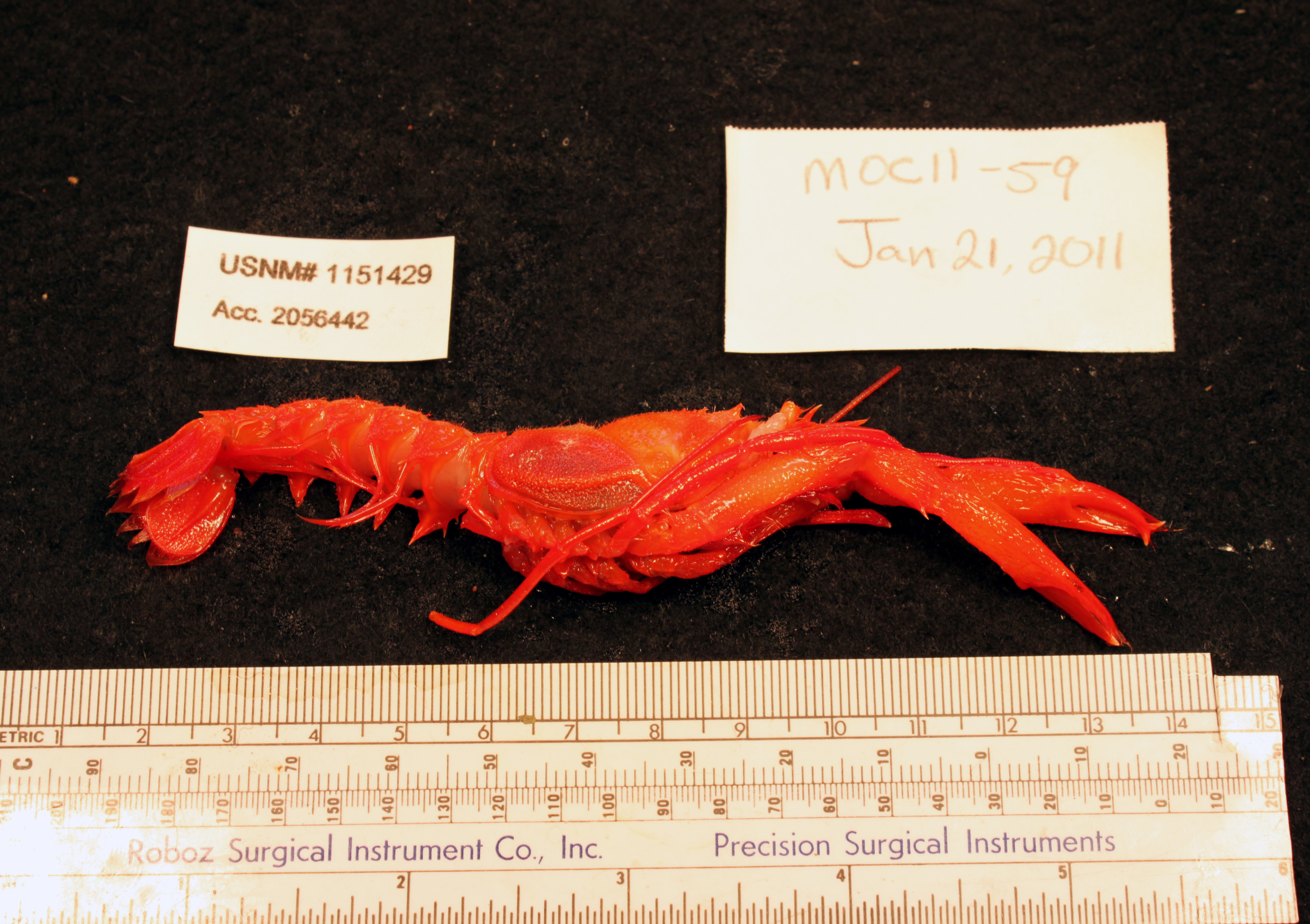
IZ 1151429 specimen of N. agassizii, recently defrosted specimen photographed prior to preservation

- Nephropsis atlantica Norman, 1882
- Nephropsis carpenteri Wood-Mason, 1885
- Nephropsis ensirostris Alcock, 1901

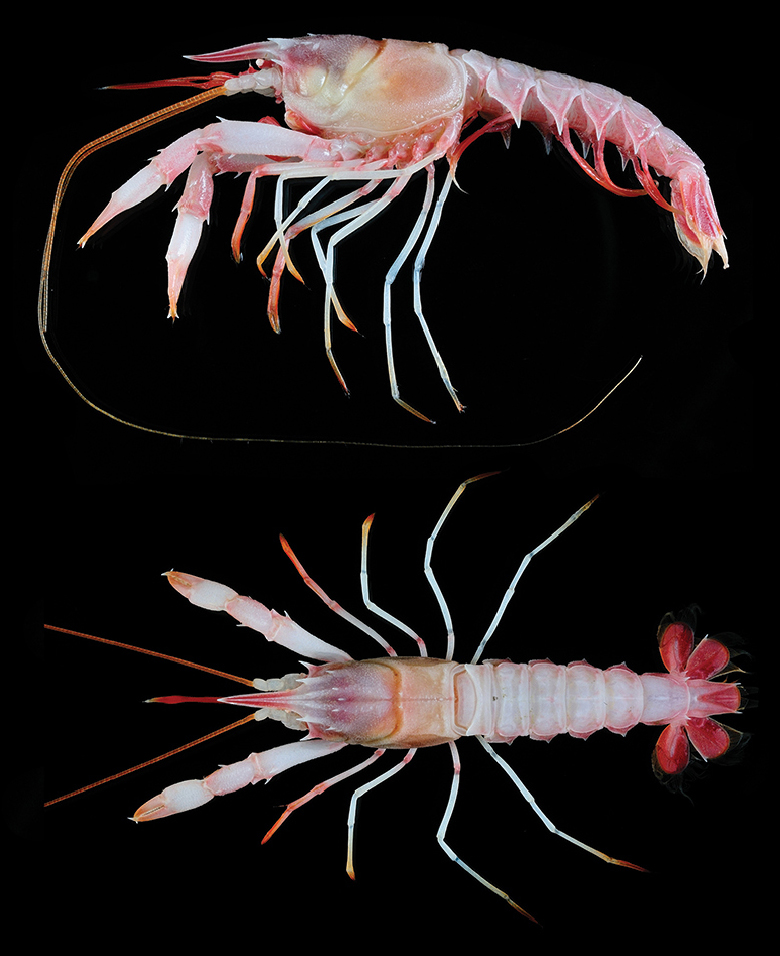
N. ensirostris

- Nephropsis grandis Zarenkov, 2006
- Nephropsis holthuisii Macpherson, 1993

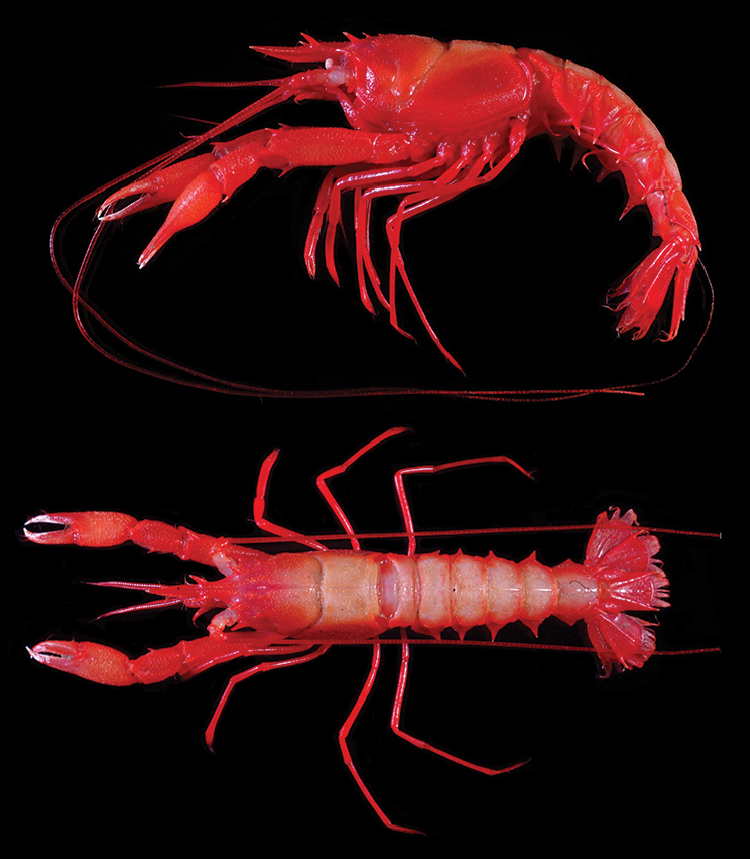
N. holthuisi

  - Nephropsis macphersoni Watabe & Iizuka, 1999 is a synonym
- Nephropsis malhaensis Borradaile, 1910
- Nephropsis neglecta Holthuis, 1974
- Nephropsis occidentalis Faxon, 1893
- Nephropsis perexigua Chan & Chang, 2026
- Nephropsis pygmaea Chang, Chan & Kumar, 2020
- Nephropsis rahayuae Chang, Chan & Kumar, 2020
- Nephropsis rosea Bate, 1888
- Nephropsis serrata Macpherson, 1993

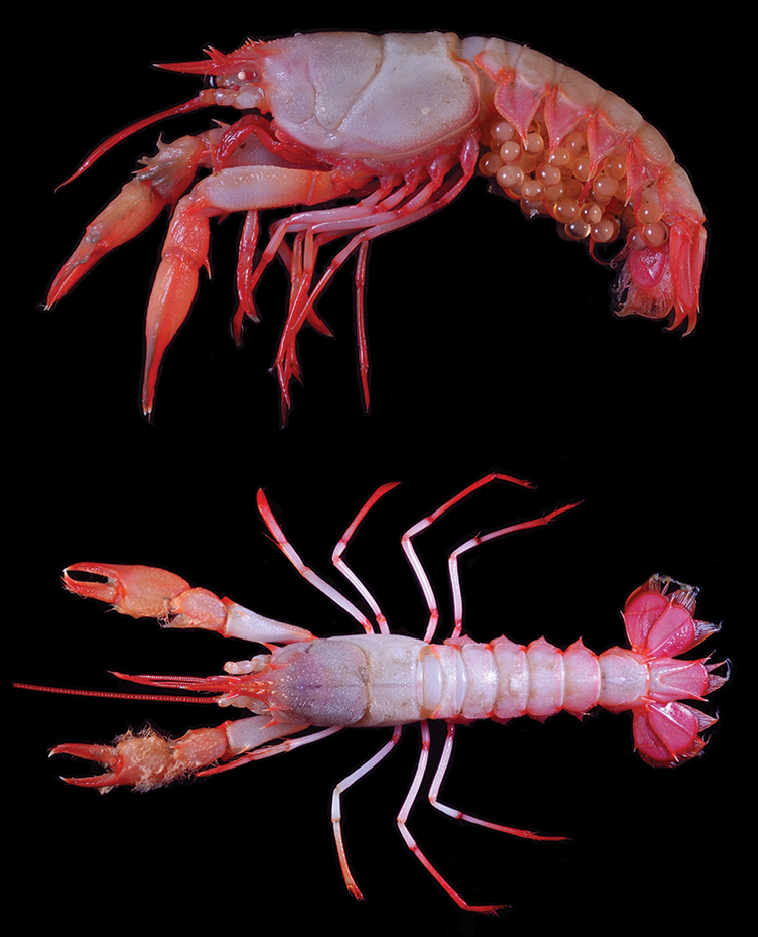
N. serrata

- Nephropsis stewarti Wood-Mason, 1872

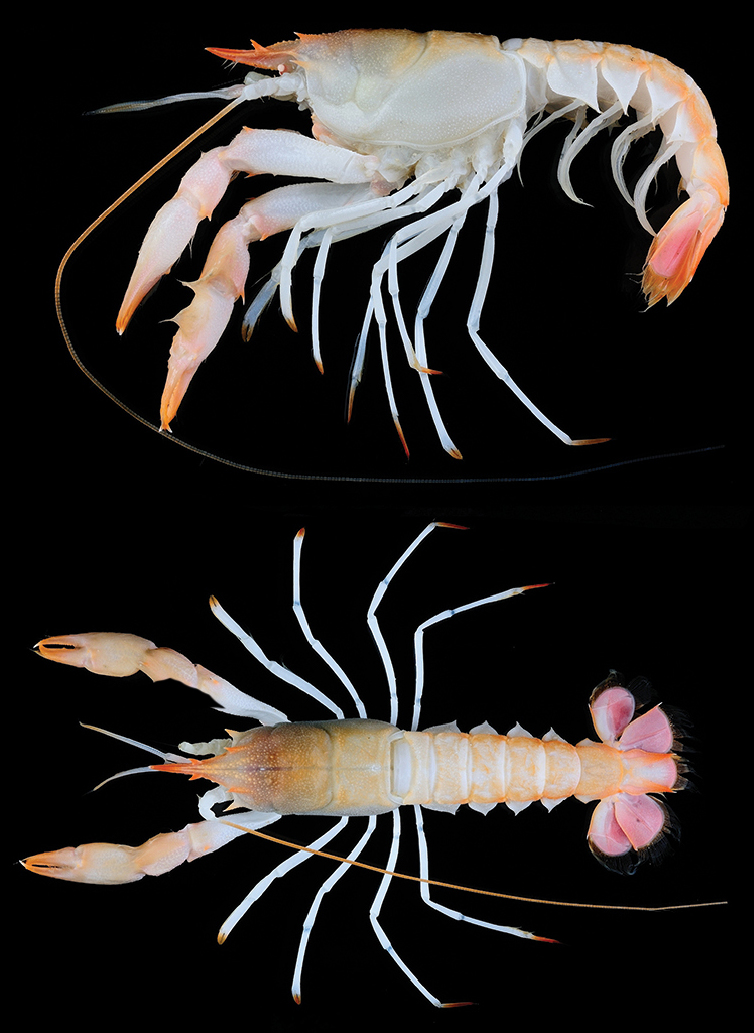
N. stewarti

- Nephropsis suhmi Bate, 1888
- Nephropsis sulcata Macpherson, 1990

One further fossil species has also been described:

- †Nephropsis midwayensis Rathbun, 1935
