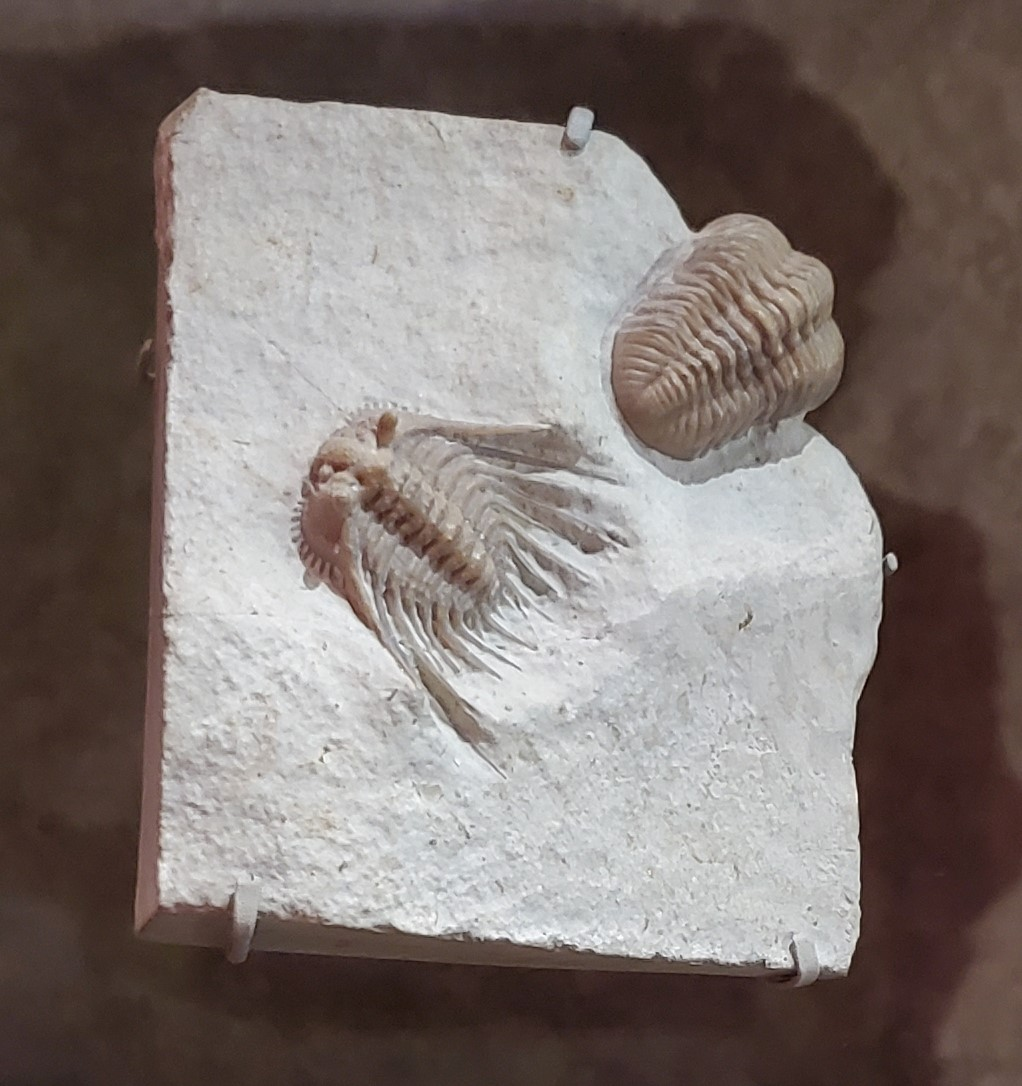
- Leonaspis williamsi (lower left) with Paciphacops raymondi (upper right)

Scientific classification
- Kingdom: Animalia
- Phylum: Arthropoda
- Clade: †Artiopoda
- Class: †Trilobita
- Order: †Odontopleurida
- Family: †Odontopleuridae
- Genus: †Leonaspis; Richter & Richter, 1917

= Leonaspis =

Leonaspis Temporal range: Late Ordovician to Middle Devonian

Genus of trilobites

Leonaspis is a widespread genus of odontopleurid trilobite that lived from the Late Ordovician to the late Middle Devonian. Fossils of various species have been found on all continents except Antarctica.

== Sources ==
- Fossils (Smithsonian Handbooks) by David Ward (Page 61)
- Leonaspis in the Paleobiology Database
