= Kingstonia =

Kingstonia Temporal range: Dresbachian

Scientific classification
- Kingdom: Animalia
- Phylum: Arthropoda
- Clade: †Artiopoda
- Class: †Trilobita
- Order: †Ptychopariida
- Family: †Kingstoniidae
- Genus: †Kingstonia; Walcott, 1924

Species
- Kingstonia apion; Kingstonia ara; Kingstonia gaspensis; Kingstonia neimonggolensis; Kingstonia peltata; Kingstonia pontotocensis; Kingstonia smithfieldensis; Kingstonia vagrans; Kingstonia walcotti

Kingstonia is an extinct genus from a well-known class of fossil marine arthropods, the trilobites. It lived from 501 to 490 million years ago during the Dresbachian faunal stage of the late Cambrian Period.
