= Volgacarcinus =

Volgacarcinus Temporal range: Paleocene (Thanetian)

Scientific classification
- Kingdom: Animalia
- Phylum: Arthropoda
- Class: Malacostraca
- Order: Decapoda
- Suborder: Pleocyemata
- Infraorder: Brachyura
- Family: †Necrocarcinidae
- Genus: †Volgacarcinus; Mychko & Schweitzer, 2026
- Species: †V. longispinus

Binomial name
- †Volgacarcinus longispinus Mychko & Schweitzer, 2026

Extinct genus of crabs

Volgacarcinus is an extinct genus of necrocarcinid crab known from the lower part of the Saratov Formation in the Shikhany locality, Saratov Oblast, Russia, dating to the Thanetian age. The genus is characterized by a straight and perpendicular posterolateral spine almost as large as its body is wide. It is a monotypic genus, represented by the single species Volgacarcinus longispinus.

== Discovery and naming ==
Volgacarcinus is known from a single attributed specimen, MWO 1 Nº 13275/2, consisting of a nearly complete carapace showcasing slight deformations and slight loss of frontal and left parts. This material was recovered from member 3 of the Shikhan Section in the Shikhany locality, Saratov Oblast, Russia, a locality consisting of the lower part of the Saratov Formation dating to the Thanetian age, Paleocene.

The generic name references Volga River, as the Shikhany locality where it was found is located along its banks, with the added suffix of -carcinus, common in brachyuran nomenclature. The specific name highlights the dimension of the diagnostic posterolateral spine, being a composite of the Latin -longa (long) and -spina (spine).

== Description ==
The carapace of Volgacarcinus is wider anteriorly (15.0 mm) than posteriorly (8.0 mm), and has a length of 16.0 mm, close to 95% of the width excluding the spines, giving it a circular outline. A dense arrangement of flattened granules covers the surface of the carapace.

=== Lateral margin ===
The carapace is delimited at the anteriormost region by the wide and straight fronto-orbital margin, consisting of a wide rostrum delimited by quite large orbits with flat, blunt outer orbital lobes. It continues to the anterolater margin (spanning from the outer point of the orbital margins to the widest point of the core carapace), which is slightly convex and probably bore what appear to be small spines, not preserved in the available fossil material. From this point continues a relatively straight posterolateral margin that slants towards the narrow and straight posterior margin, this one located at the posteriormost region and delimited by two small lobes. The genus is unusual among members of Necrocarcinidae by the presence of a very large and straight posterolateral spine perpendicular to the carapace, with its length (7.4 mm) approaching its posterior width.

=== Carapace regions ===
The carapace of brachyurans is composed of several regions named in accordance with the associated position of certain internal anatomical structures below it.

The two epigastric regions, two protogastric regions , and the convex mesogastric region (subdivisions of the gastric region) present each a large tubercle and are continuous with each other and the hepatic region, not being separated by grooves. A sinusoidal cervical groove delimits these regions from the branchial region, and ends in gastric pits located at the posterior of the mesogastric region. From this region follow, axially and from anterior to posterior, a narrow and convex urogastric region, followed by a cardiac region also convex but larger than the previous, both bearing a large tubercle, and a small and narrow intestinal region.

The branchial region, situated more laterally in the body, consists of a wide epibranchial region with an anteriorly placed large tubercle a convex ridge containing a medially placed tubercle, and a mesobranchial region with two anteriorly positioned tubercles, one of them large and placed posterior to the smaller other.
