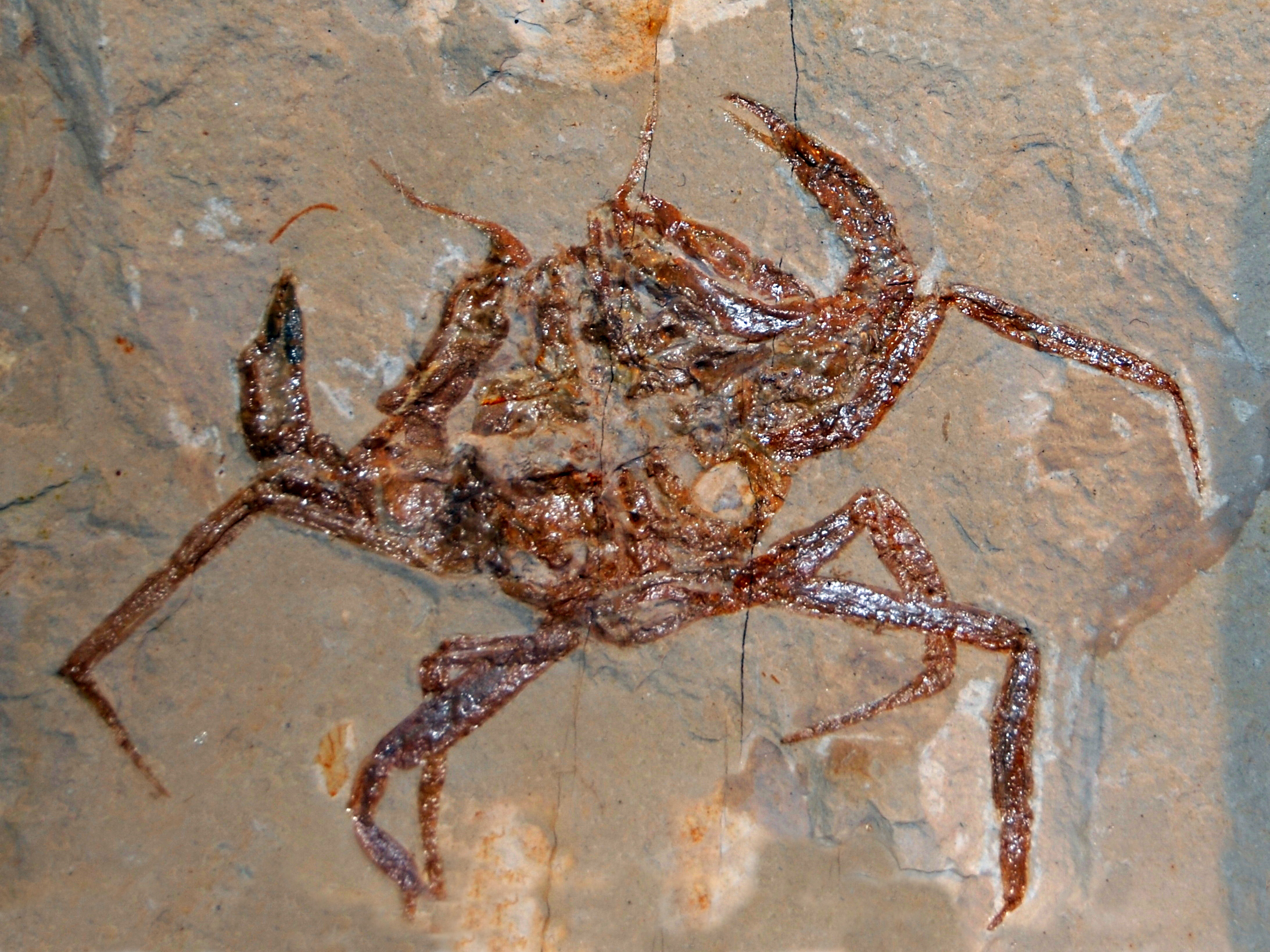
- Corazzatocarcinus hadjoulae

Scientific classification
- Kingdom: Animalia
- Phylum: Arthropoda
- Class: Malacostraca
- Order: Decapoda
- Suborder: Pleocyemata
- Infraorder: Brachyura
- Section: Raninoida
- Superfamily: †Necrocarcinoidea
- Family: †Necrocarcinidae; Foster, 1968

= Necrocarcinidae =

Necrocarcinidae Temporal range: Kimmeridgian–Ypresian

Extinct family of crabs

Necrocarcinidae is an extinct family of Late Jurassic, Cretaceous and Paleogene crabs. It comprises 40 species grouped in seven genera.

== Genera ==
Genera within this family include:

- Arcticocarcinus Schweitzer et al., 2016
- Corazzatocarcinus Larghi, 2004
- Cristella Collins and Rasmussen 1992
- Necrocarcinus Bell, 1863
- Paranecrocarcinus Van Straelen, 1936
- Polycnemidium Reuss, 1859
- Pseudonecrocarcinus Förster, 1968
- Shazella Collins & Williams, 2004
- Volgacarcinus Mychko & Schweitzer, 2026
