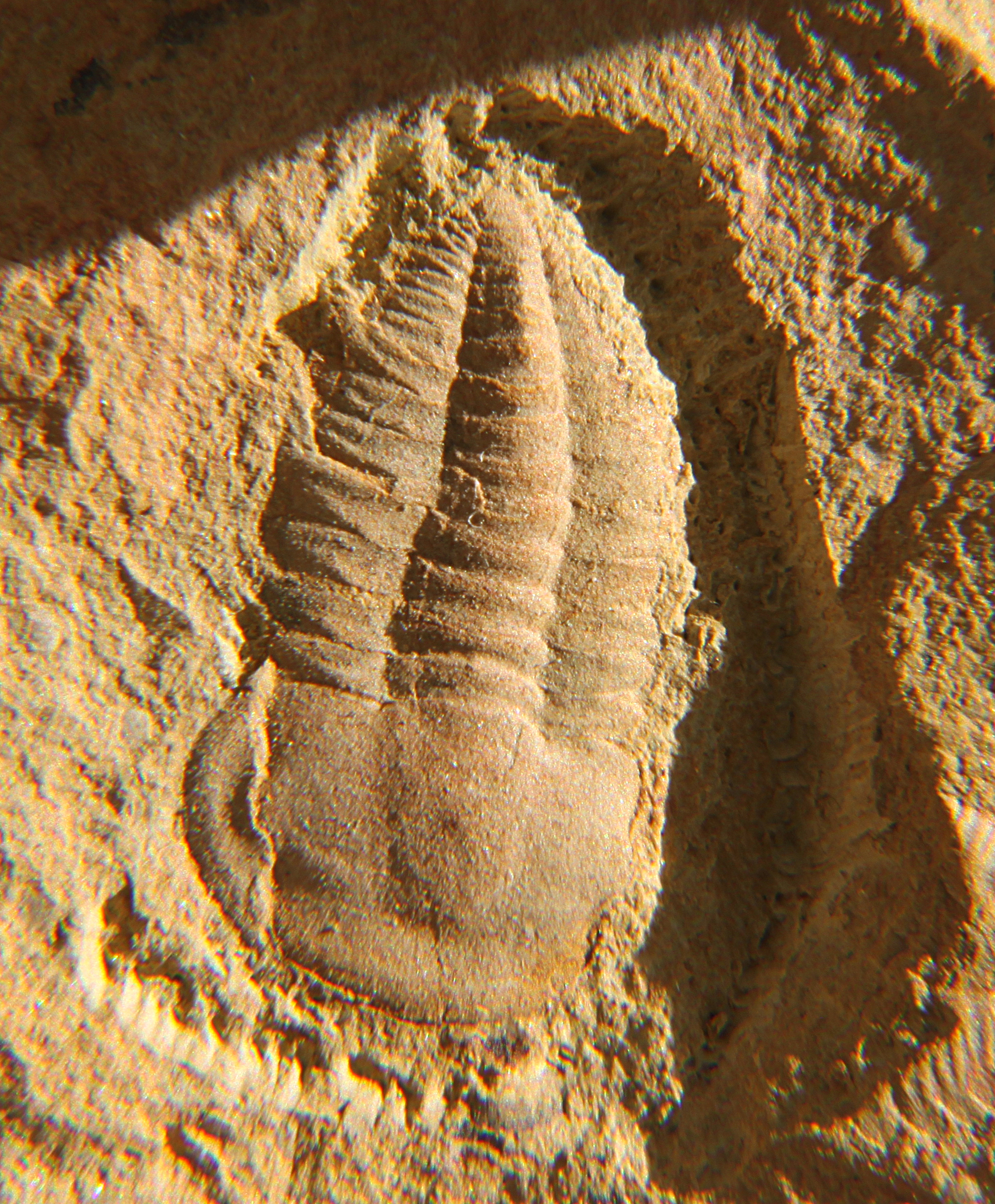
- Yunnanocephalus yunnanensis, 18 mm (0.71 in)

Scientific classification
- Kingdom: Animalia
- Phylum: Arthropoda
- Clade: †Artiopoda
- Class: †Trilobita
- Order: †Ptychopariida
- Family: †Yunnanocephalidae
- Genus: †Yunnanocephalus; Kobayashi, 1936

Type species
- Ptychoparia yunnanensis

Species
- Yunnanocephalus yunnanensis (Mansuy, 1912); Yunnanocephalus longioccipitalis Palmer & Rowell, 1995; Yunnanocephalus macromelos Paterson & Brock, 2007

Synonyms
- Pseudoptychoparia

= Yunnanocephalus =

Yunnanocephalus Temporal range: Late Atdabanian-Botomian

Extinct genus of trilobites

Yunnanocephalus is a genus of ptychopariid trilobite. It lived during the late Atdabanian and Botomian stages, in what are currently Antarctica, Australia and China. It was a "moderately common" member of the Chengjiang Fauna.

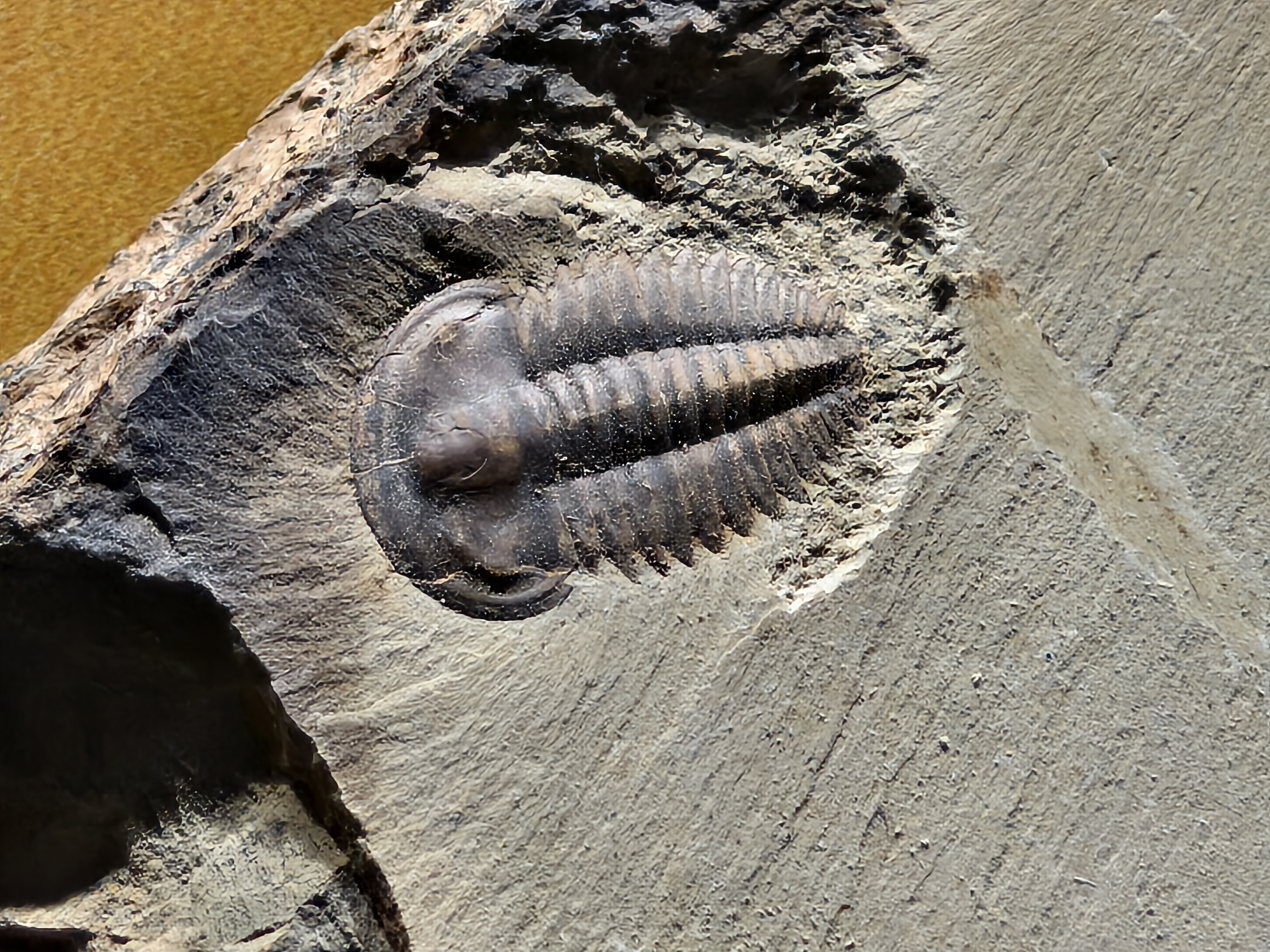
Yunnanocephalus yunnanensis, about 2 cm long. Chengjiang Fossil Site Museum, specimen found at the local site.

== Description ==
Yunnanocephalus is a small (about 2 centimetres or 0.79 inches) trilobite with an inverted elongated egg-shaped outline. Its headshield (or cephalon) is ovate and twice as wide as long, slightly wider than and not confluent with the articulate middle part of the exoskeleton (or thorax). The raised central section (or glabella) is weakly defined, without clear furrows except for one defining the occipital ring, tapering forward, with the front straight and confluent with the eye ridges. The occipital ring is about as wide as the border and the axial rings of the thorax. The distance between the glabella and the frontal border is slightly wider that the border. The visual surface of the eye is rather small (about 20% of the length of the cephalon), with the front about halflength of the cephalon. The natural rupture line (or suture) anterior of the visual surface is parallel to the midline or converges slightly forward and from the back of the eye diverges to the middle of the widely rounded back edges of the cephalon. The thorax has 14 segments, with short triangular spines, the 3rd and 4th slightly wider than the frontal segments, and a small tailshield (or pygidium) consisting almost fully of the axis and post axial boss, with two vaguely defined axial rings.

== Ontogeny ==
During the ontogenetic development of Y. yunnanensis between a late larval phase (meraspis degree 9, 2½mm) and the adult (or holaspis) the facial suture changes from proparian to gonatoparian. Although this development has also been observed in Duyunaspis duyunensis, it is really uncommon. Usually, proparian holaspid trilobites developed from opisthoparian meraspids due to a mechanism called heterochrony.

== Distribution ==
- Y. longioccipitalis is known from the Lower Cambrian of Antarctica (Atdabanian, Shackleton Limestone, 81.9° S, 158.7° E).
- Y. macromelos has been found in the Lower Cambrian of Australia (Botomian, Mernmerna Formation, Angorichina station, east side of The Bunkers, 1 km S Balcoracana Creek, South-Australia, 31.2° S, 138.9° E).
- Y. yunnanensis occurs in the Lower Cambrian of China (Atdabanian, Yuanshan or Qiongzhusi Formation, Chengjiang biota, near Haikou, Anning, Jinning, Jingmacun, Kunming, Yunnan, 24.8° N, 102.6° E; and Maotianshan Bed 4, 24.0° N, 102.0° E).
