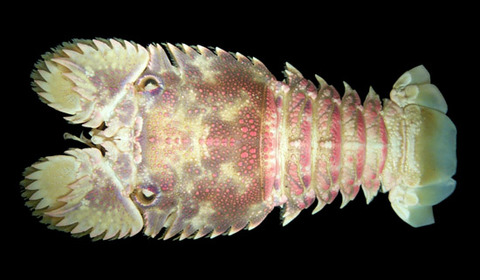

Conservation status
- Data Deficient (IUCN 3.1)

Scientific classification
- Kingdom: Animalia
- Phylum: Arthropoda
- Class: Malacostraca
- Order: Decapoda
- Suborder: Pleocyemata
- Family: Scyllaridae
- Genus: Parribacus
- Species: P. perlatus

Binomial name
- Parribacus perlatus Holthuis, 1967

= Parribacus perlatus =

Species of crustacean

Parribacus perlatus, the Easter Island mitten lobster, is a species of slipper lobster found around Easter Island in the Pacific Ocean. The lobster is a traditional food source for the Rapanui where it is known as rape-rape.

== Description ==
Adults of Panulirus pascuensis can grow to a total length of 11 centimetres (4 in), with a carapace 4–5 cm (1.6–2.0 in) long.

== Distribution and habitat ==
Panulirus pascuensis is native to the coast of Easter Island in the south eastern Pacific Ocean. It is found on rocky shores in shallow waters at depths of up to 2–18 metres (6 ft 7 in – 59 ft 1 in), hiding during the day under boulders and in crevices.
