= Prawn killer =

Prawn killer may refer to:

- At least two species of slipper lobster in the genus Ibacus:

- Ibacus alticrenatus
- Ibacus peronii

- Mantis shrimp
