= Galearctus avulsus =

Conservation status
- Least Concern (IUCN 3.1)

Scientific classification
- Kingdom: Animalia
- Phylum: Arthropoda
- Class: Malacostraca
- Order: Decapoda
- Suborder: Pleocyemata
- Family: Scyllaridae
- Genus: Galearctus
- Species: G. avulsus

Binomial name
- Galearctus avulsus Yang, Chen & Chan, 2011

Species of crustacean

Galearctus avulsus is a species of slipper lobster that lives around New Caledonia. It was described in 2011, having previously been included in Galearctus kitanovirosus. It differs from the other species of the genus Galearctus most noticeably in the shape of a groove on the sternum.

== Description ==
Galearctus avulsus is a small slipper lobster, with a carapace around 16–32 millimetres (0.63–1.26 in) long, including the rostrum. It differs from the other species in the genus Galearctus by the shape of the groove on the midline of the sternum between the first pair of pereiopods. In the other species, this groove is narrow, but in G. avulsus, it widens and appears as if "torn away".

== Distribution and conservation ==
Galearctus avulsus lives in the waters around New Caledonia and the Chesterfield Islands, at depths of 230–680 metres (750–2,230 ft). It may also occur around Fiji. Although G. avulsus is very poorly known, it has a large range and no apparent threats, and is therefore listed as being of Least Concern on the IUCN Red List.

== Taxonomic history ==
In 1962, Harada described a new species of slipper lobster, "Scyllarus kitanoviriosus" from shallow water (less than 100 m or 330 ft deep) around Japan, Korea and Taiwan. In 2002, Lipke Holthuis revised the Indo-Pacific slipper lobsters, erecting a new genus, Galearctus for "S. kitanoviriosus" and its nearest relatives. At the same time, Holthuis added records of G. kitanoviriosus from deeper waters in the South Pacific. Re-examination of the specimens from the two parts of the range by Chien-Hui Yang, I-Shiung Chen and Tin-Yam Chan from National Taiwan Ocean University revealed constant differences between the two groups. Since the type material of G. kitanoviriosus was from the northern part of the range, they described the southern populations as a new species, G. avulsus; the specific epithet avulsus meaning "torn away", in reference to the shape of the median groove on the first thoracic sternite. DNA sequencing of the cytochrome oxidase I gene suggests that the nearest relative of G. avulsus is not G. kitanoviriosus but G. rapanus.
