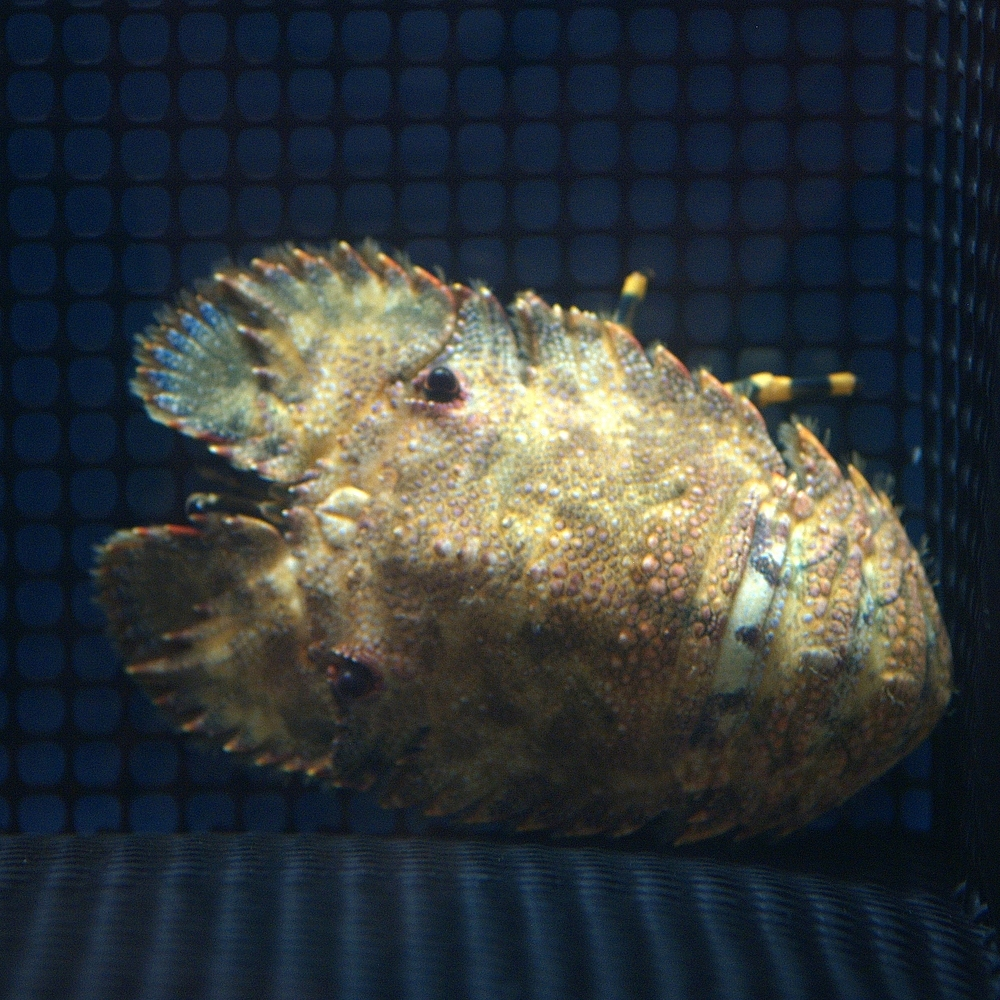

Conservation status
- Data Deficient (IUCN 3.1)

Scientific classification
- Kingdom: Animalia
- Phylum: Arthropoda
- Class: Malacostraca
- Order: Decapoda
- Suborder: Pleocyemata
- Family: Scyllaridae
- Genus: Parribacus
- Species: P. japonicus

Binomial name
- Parribacus japonicus Holthuis, 1960

= Parribacus japonicus =

Species of crustacean

Parribacus japonicus, the Japanese mitten lobster, is a species of slipper lobster. Though the common name for this lobster is the Japanese mitten lobster, it is locally called zōri-ebi (ゾウリエビ) – zōri denoting the Japanese sandal it resembles, and ebi meaning shrimp or lobster.

== Discovery ==
Parribacus japonicus was first established as a new species by Dutch carcinologist Lipke B. Holthuis in 1960. Prior to this, P. japonicus was assumed to be P. antarcticus, as the latter is similar in appearance and is also found in the Pacific Ocean. In 1985, Holthuis differentiated P. japonicus from other Parribacus species based on detailed external adult morphology.

== Taxonomy ==
P. japonicus is one of six species belonging to the genus Parribacus, which is one of three genera belonging to the subfamily Ibacinae. Ibacinae is one of four subfamilies under family Scyllaridae, which includes all scyllarids or slipper lobsters – clawless decapod crustaceans easily distinguished by their flat and wide plate-like second antennae. Nucleotide sequencing and phylogenetic estimations show that P. japonicus is most closely related to P. antarcticus than to other Parribacus species.

== Etymology ==
The genus name Parribacus is not, as often presumed, from the words "para" and "Ibacus" to suggest 'apart from Ibacus'; "Parr" comes from the last name of Cuban marine fauna researcher and author Don Antonio Parra, who first described P. antarcticus in 1787. The species epithet japonicus in the binomial name of this species signifies its geographical distribution.

== Description ==
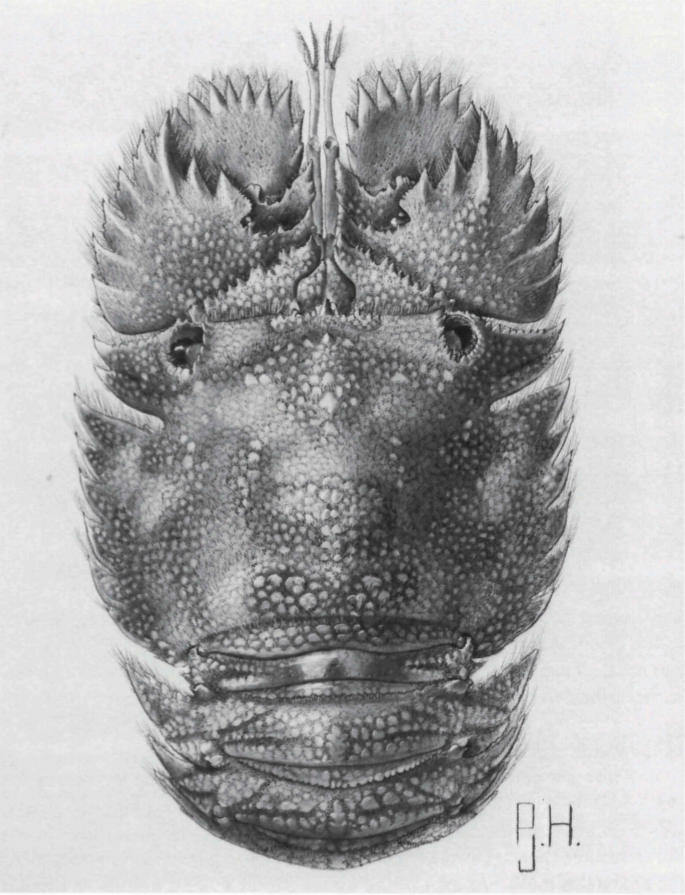

P. japonicus grows to a maximum length of 16 centimeters, and the length of its carapace ranges from 4 to 7.4 centimeters. Females are larger than males. Its carapace and the upper abdomen are brown, its anterior edge has a bluish tinge, and its lower body and legs are yellowish brown. The tubercles, or protrusions, on the side of its back are purple, while the tubercles on the middle of its back are cherry red; smaller tubercles all over its back are white. Furthermore, its entire body is covered in short brown velvety hairs.

The antennular flagella of P. japonicus extend beyond its anterior margin, and its posterior margin is rounded rather than fan shaped. The sixth antennal segment bears one tooth on the inner margin and seven to eight teeth on the anterior margin. The distance between its orbits is approximately two and half times more than the distance between an orbit and the anterolateral angle. The two lateral teeth before the notch on the carapace are only slightly smaller than the equally sized six lateral teeth behind it.

The transverse groove, which separates the 20 somites (segments) on the abdomen of P. japonicus, is packed with numerous short hairs. Its first somite has three to five ill-defined spots on the posterior margin, and its second to fifth somites have narrow superficial groves that exhibit a reticular pattern.

P. scarlatinus is closest in external morphology to P. japonicus. However, other than the apical tooth and two teeth on the inner margin, P. japonicus has five teeth at the outer margin of its second antennal segment, while P. scarlatinus has six. Additionally, P. japonicus lacks a rostral tooth on its back in comparison to P. scarlatinus, where rostrum is the extension of the anterior carapace margin. Moreover, P. japonicus has an overall brown color with three to five indistinct dark purple spots on its carapace, whereas P. scarlatinus has overall red color with contrastingly dark red spots on its carapace.

== Distribution ==
P. japonicus inhabits the northwestern coast of Japan, west of Maizuru. It is also found on the Pacific coast of Japan, from Tokyo Bay to southwest of the Ryukyu Islands, and even further south the Pacific Ocean towards the northeast coast of Taiwan. P. japonicus is a benthic species that lives on the reefs of continental shelves, at depths of up to 20 meters (66 feet).

== Development ==
P. japonicus, like all other members of Scyllaridae, goes through three phases between hatching from their eggs and reaching adult form: the phyllosoma larva, puerulus/nisto larva, and juvenile stage. The phyllosoma larva is a transparent, long-legged, leaf-like planktonic zoea; this larval phase lasts for several months. Various stages of Parribacus phyllosoma larvae have been found to be carried by the Kuroshio Current and countercurrent between Japanese and Taiwanese waters. The puerulus/nisto larva is a short-lived benthic megalopa, which transitions into the benthic juvenile.

== Reproduction ==
It is an gonochorous external brooder. Mating takes place from May to July, with the greatest activity during July. Premating sexual selection through smell and touch signals is common, during which the male shows himself off to the female. The male presents his sperm to the female indirectly and outside her body, with which she makes direct contact to be fertilized.

== Human consumption ==
Like all other slipper lobsters, P. japonicus is edible. It is trapped in gill nets by local fishermen and sold for its meat, but it is otherwise of little commercial importance.
