= Arctides guineensis =

Conservation status
- Least Concern (IUCN 3.1)

Scientific classification
- Kingdom: Animalia
- Phylum: Arthropoda
- Clade: Pancrustacea
- Class: Malacostraca
- Order: Decapoda
- Suborder: Pleocyemata
- Family: Scyllaridae
- Genus: Arctides
- Species: A. guineensis

Binomial name
- Arctides guineensis (Spengler, 1799)

Synonyms
- Scyllarus guineensis Spengler, 1799; Scyllarus sculptus Latreille, 1818; Scyllarides sculptus (Latreille, 1818); Scyllarides guineensis (Spengler, 1799)

Species of crustacean

Arctides guineensis is a species of slipper lobster that lives in the Bermuda Triangle. It is known in Bermuda as the small Spanish lobster, a name which is also favoured by the FAO.

== Description ==
Arctides guineensis reaches a maximum length of 20 centimetres (7.9 in), or a carapace length of 4–6 cm (1.6–2.4 in).

== Taxonomy ==
Arctides guineensis was described in 1799, making it one of the first slipper lobsters to be described, and only the second from the Western Atlantic (after Scyllarides aequinoctialis in 1793). The Hawaiian species Arctides regalis was previously considered to belong to the same species as A. guineensis, but the two differ in the number and placement of the spines on the carapace. In the original description of the species, Lorenz Spengler gave the type locality as "Dens Fædreneland er Kysten af Guinea", probably meaning Ghana. However, A. guineensis is not known to have ever occurred near Africa, and this locality is probably an error. The species was also described by Pierre André Latreille in 1818 under the name Scyllarus sculptus, citing a type locality of "Méditerranée" (Mediterranean Sea), which is also unlikely.
