= Dactylonia holthuisi =

Scientific classification
- Kingdom: Animalia
- Phylum: Arthropoda
- Clade: Pancrustacea
- Class: Malacostraca
- Order: Decapoda
- Suborder: Pleocyemata
- Infraorder: Caridea
- Family: Palaemonidae
- Genus: Dactylonia
- Species: D. holthuisi

Binomial name
- Dactylonia holthuisi Fransen, 2002

Species of crustacean

Dactylonia holthuisi is a small shrimp in the family Palaemonidae, first described by Charles Fransen in 2002. The species epithet honours Lipke Holthuis.

It is known from Ambon and Bali, where it was collected from an aggregate of ascidians of Plurella species.
