= Scyllarus pygmaeus =

Conservation status
- Least Concern (IUCN 3.1)

Scientific classification
- Kingdom: Animalia
- Phylum: Arthropoda
- Class: Malacostraca
- Order: Decapoda
- Suborder: Pleocyemata
- Family: Scyllaridae
- Genus: Scyllarus
- Species: S. pygmaeus

Binomial name
- Scyllarus pygmaeus (Bate, 1888)

Synonyms
- Nisto laevis Sarato, 1885; Arctus pygmaeus Bate, 1888; Arctus immaturus Bate, 1888; Scyllarus immaturus Bouvier, 1912

Species of crustacean

Scyllarus pygmaeus is a species of slipper lobster that lives in shallow water in the Mediterranean Sea and eastern Atlantic Ocean. It grows to a length of 55 mm (2.2 in), which is too small for it to be fished for food. The juvenile form was first described in 1885, with the description of the adult following in 1888 as a result of the Challenger expedition.

== Description ==
Scyllarus pygmaeus is the smallest slipper lobster species, with a carapace length of 11.5 mm (0.45 in) for females, and 10 mm (0.39 in) for males. The total body length can reach 55 mm (2.2 in), but is typically less than 40 mm (1.6 in). Its small size precludes S. pygmaeus from being a target for fisheries. The body of S. pygmaeus is "pale brownish or pinkish with patches of darker hairs".

Scyllarus pygmaeus resembles a young individual of Scyllarus arctus, with which it occurs in sympatry. The two species can be distinguished by a suite of characteristics:

- The anterior part of the abdominal tergites has a groove lined with hairs in S. pygmaeus, but not in S. arctus.
- S. arctus has a forward-pointing, pointed tip to the second abdominal sternites, while in S. pygmaeus, it is rounded and points backwards.
- S. pygmaeus has a conical tubercle on the fifth thoracic somite, while the tubercle is compressed rather than conical in S. arctus.
- The sculptured posterior part of the first abdominal somite is wider in the centre than at the edges in S. pygmaeus, while in S. arctus, it is an even width throughout.

== Distribution and ecology ==
Scyllarus pygmaeus has a wide distribution in the Mediterranean Sea and islands in the eastern Atlantic Ocean, including Madeira, the Canary Islands, and the Cape Verde Islands. It has not been observed off the coast of North Africa further east than Morocco. It lives at depths of 5–100 metres (16–328 ft), where it is nocturnal and at its shallower ranges lives in Posidonia meadows. Females carry eggs in June and August.

== Taxonomic history ==
Scyllarus pygmaeus was first described in 1888 by Charles Spence Bate as part of the results of the Challenger expedition. He based his description of "Arctus pygmaeus" on material from "off Gomera" in the Canary Islands. In the same publication, he also described "Arctus immaturus" from the Cape Verde archipelago, which Eugène Louis Bouvier realised in 1915 was simply the "nisto" (juvenile) stage of S. pygmaeus. Applying the principle of first reviser, Bouvier established that S. pygmaeus would be the valid name, over S. immaturus. Although S. pygmaeus is not rare in the Mediterranean Sea, its presence there was overlooked for decades, due to the confusion between it and the more conspicuous S. arctus, whose immature form S. pygmaeus was often assumed to be. In 1960, Jacques Forest and Lipke Holthuis demonstrated for the first time that S. pygmaeus does indeed occur in the Mediterranean Sea, from museum specimens at the Stazione Zoologica in Naples.

The juvenile "nisto" form of S. pygmaeus was named earlier than the adult form; Sarado described it in 1885 under the name Nisto laevis in his 1885 work Étude sur les crustacés de Nice ("Study of the crustaceans of Nice").

The English vernacular name preferred by the Food and Agriculture Organization is pygmy locust lobster, alongside the French cigale naine and the Spanish cigarra enana.
