= Petrarctus =

Scientific classification
- Kingdom: Animalia
- Phylum: Arthropoda
- Class: Malacostraca
- Order: Decapoda
- Suborder: Pleocyemata
- Family: Scyllaridae
- Subfamily: Scyllarinae
- Genus: Petrarctus; Holthuis, 2002

Genus of crustaceans

Petrarctus is a genus of slipper lobsters belonging to the family Scyllaridae.

== Species ==
- Petrarctus brevicornis (Holthuis, 1946)
- Petrarctus demani (Holthuis, 1946)
- Petrarctus holthuisi Yang, Chen & Chan, 2008
- Petrarctus jeppiaari Yang, Kumar & Chan, 2017
- Petrarctus rugosus (H. Milne Edwards, 1837)
- Petrarctus veliger Holthuis, 2002
