= Eduarctus =

Scientific classification
- Kingdom: Animalia
- Phylum: Arthropoda
- Class: Malacostraca
- Order: Decapoda
- Suborder: Pleocyemata
- Family: Scyllaridae
- Subfamily: Scyllarinae
- Genus: Eduarctus; Holthuis, 2002

Genus of crustaceans

Eduarctus is a genus of slipper lobsters belonging to the family Scyllaridae.

== Species ==
- Eduarctus aesopius (Holthuis, 1960)
- Eduarctus lewinsohni (Holthuis, 1967)
- Eduarctus marginatus Holthuis, 2002
- Eduarctus martensii (Pfeffer, 1881)
- Eduarctus modestus (Holthuis, 1960)
- Eduarctus perspicillatus Holthuis, 2002
- Eduarctus pyrrhonotus Holthuis, 2002
- Eduarctus reticulatus Holthuis, 2002
