= Acantharctus =

Scientific classification
- Kingdom: Animalia
- Phylum: Arthropoda
- Class: Malacostraca
- Order: Decapoda
- Suborder: Pleocyemata
- Family: Scyllaridae
- Genus: Acantharctus; Holthuis, 2002

Genus of crustaceans

Acantharctus is a genus of slipper lobsters belonging to the family Scyllaridae.

== Species ==
- Acantharctus delfini (Bouvier, 1909)
- Acantharctus ornatus (Holthuis, 1960)
- Acantharctus posteli (Forest, 1963)
