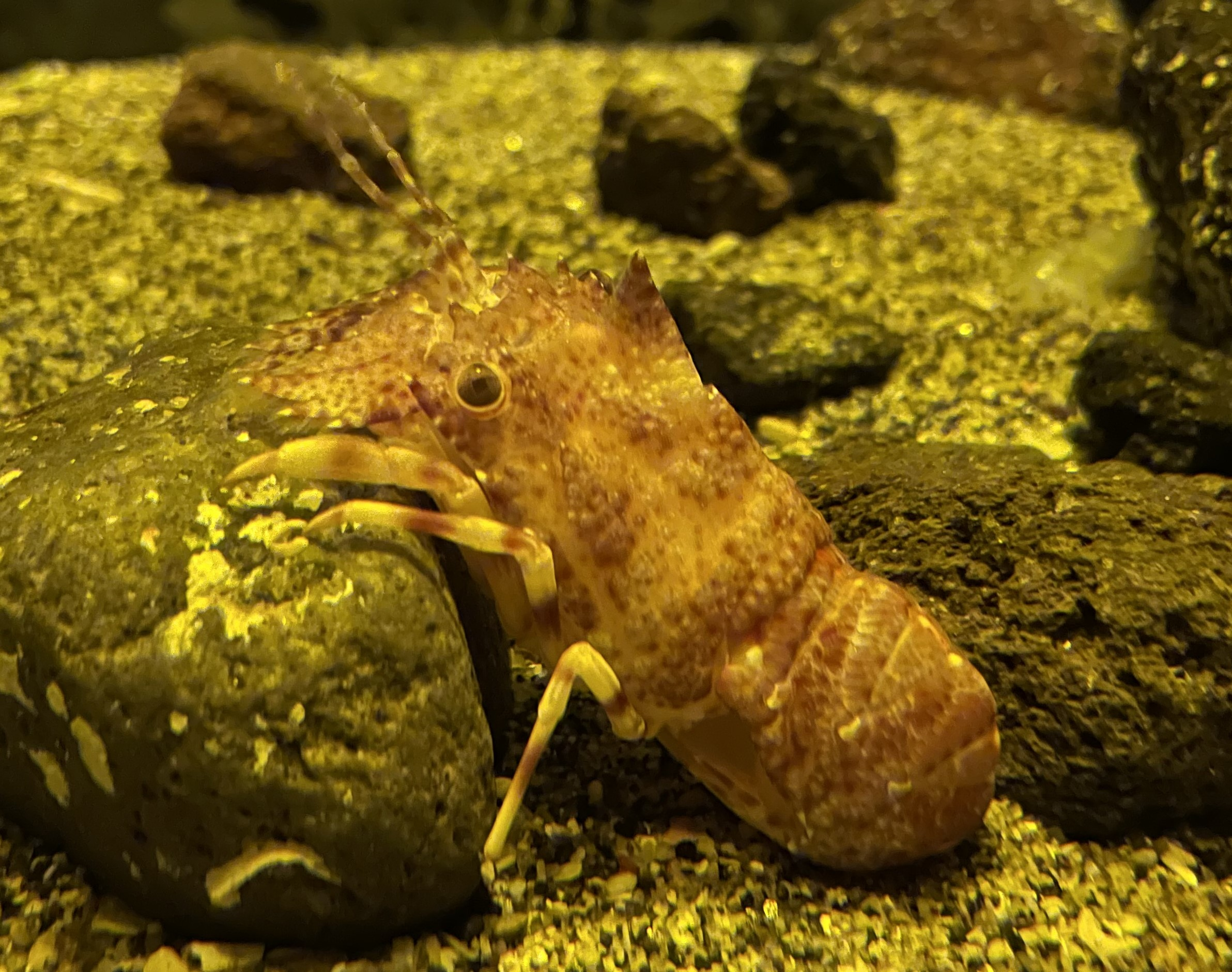
- Galearctus timidus

Scientific classification
- Kingdom: Animalia
- Phylum: Arthropoda
- Class: Malacostraca
- Order: Decapoda
- Suborder: Pleocyemata
- Family: Scyllaridae
- Subfamily: Scyllarinae
- Genus: Galearctus; Holthuis, 2001

= Galearctus =

Genus of crustaceans

Galearctus is a genus of slipper lobsters, comprising the following species:

- Galearctus aurora (Holthuis, 1982)
- Galearctus avulsus Yang, Chen & Chan, 2011
- Galearctus kitanoviriosus (Harada, 1962)
- Galearctus rapanus (Holthuis, 1993)
- Galearctus timidus (Holthuis, 1960)
- Galearctus umbilicatus (Holthuis, 1977)
