= Antarctus =

Scientific classification
- Kingdom: Animalia
- Phylum: Arthropoda
- Class: Malacostraca
- Order: Decapoda
- Suborder: Pleocyemata
- Family: Scyllaridae
- Genus: Antarctus; Holthuis, 2002
- Species: A. mawsoni

Binomial name
- Antarctus mawsoni (Bage, 1938)

Genus of crustaceans

Antarctus is a genus of slipper lobsters belonging to the family Scyllaridae.

The genus is represented by only one species, Antarctus mawsoni.
