= Arctides antipodarum =

Scientific classification
- Kingdom: Animalia
- Phylum: Arthropoda
- Class: Malacostraca
- Order: Decapoda
- Suborder: Pleocyemata
- Family: Scyllaridae
- Genus: Arctides
- Species: A. antipodarum

Binomial name
- Arctides antipodarum Holthuis, 1960

Species of lobster

Arctides antipodum is a species of slipper lobster in the family Scyllaridae.
