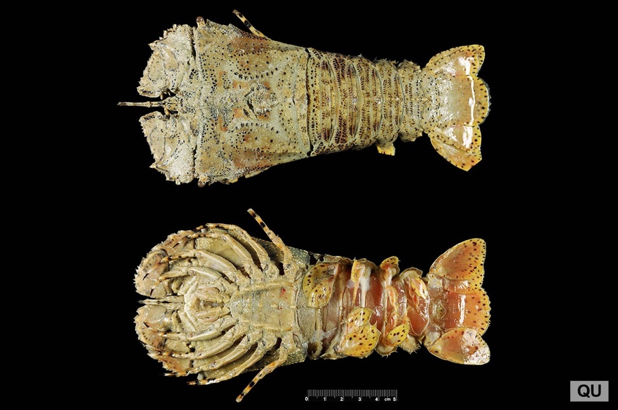

Conservation status
- Least Concern (IUCN 3.1)

Scientific classification
- Kingdom: Animalia
- Phylum: Arthropoda
- Clade: Pancrustacea
- Class: Malacostraca
- Order: Decapoda
- Suborder: Pleocyemata
- Family: Scyllaridae
- Subfamily: Theninae; Holthuis, 1985
- Genus: Thenus; Leach, 1815
- Species: T. orientalis

Binomial name
- Thenus orientalis (Lund, 1793)

= Thenus =

Thenus orientalis

Genus of crustaceans

Thenus orientalis is a species of slipper lobster from the Indian and Pacific oceans.

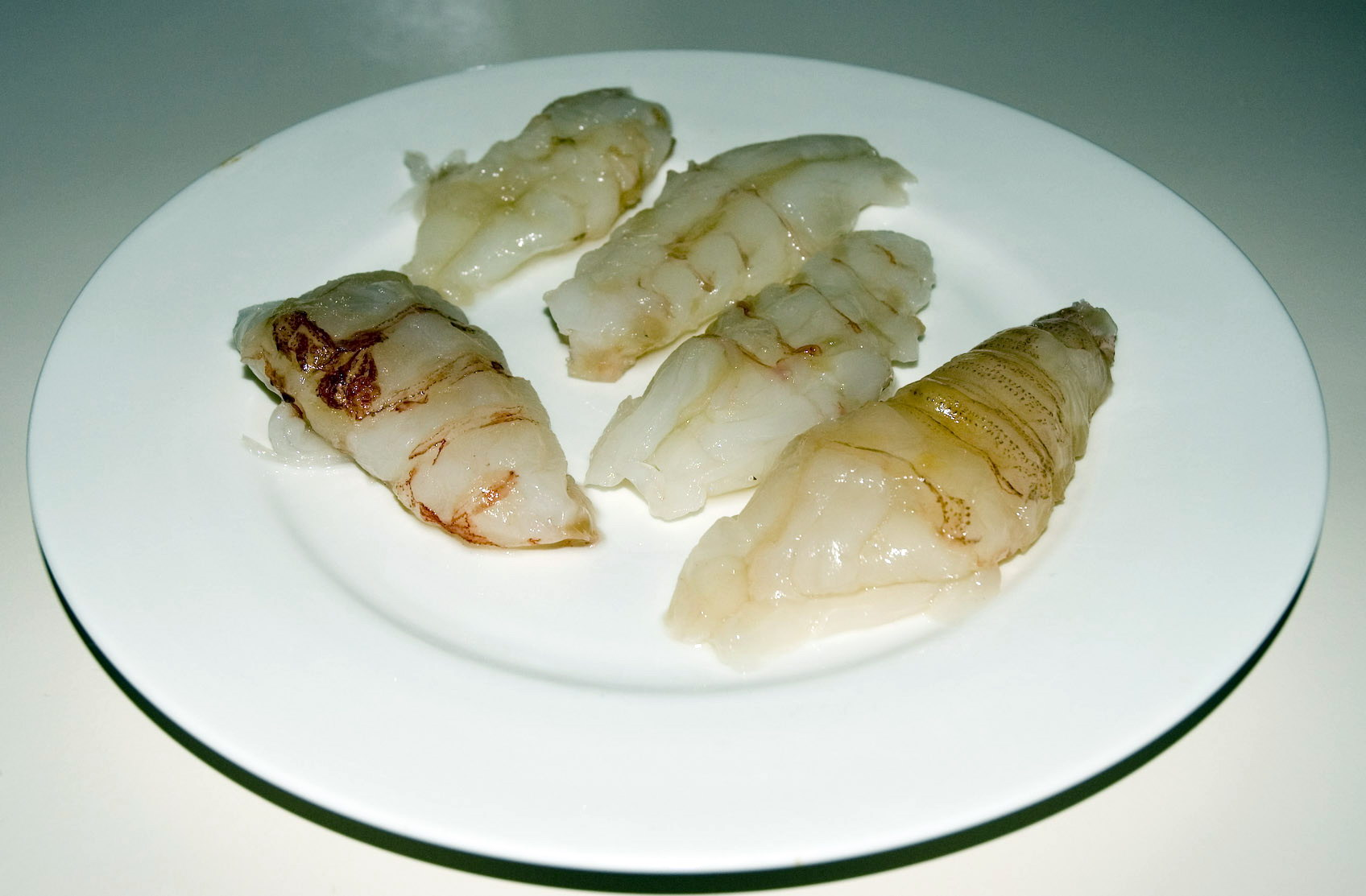
Moreton Bay bug flesh prior to cooking

T. orientalis is known by a number of common names. The United Nations Food and Agriculture Organization prefers the name flathead lobster, while in Australia, it is more widely known as the Moreton Bay bug (often shortened to just bug) after Moreton Bay, Brisbane, Queensland. In Singapore, both the flathead lobster and true crayfish are called crayfish. They are used in many Singaporean dishes. The species is sometimes confused with the Balmain bug (Ibacus peronii) but it can be distinguished by the placement of the eyes: the eyes of I. peronii are near the midline, while those of T. orientalis are at the margin of the carapace.

T. orientalis has a strongly depressed body and grows to a maximum body length of 25 centimetres (9.8 in), or a carapace length of 8 cm (3.1 in).

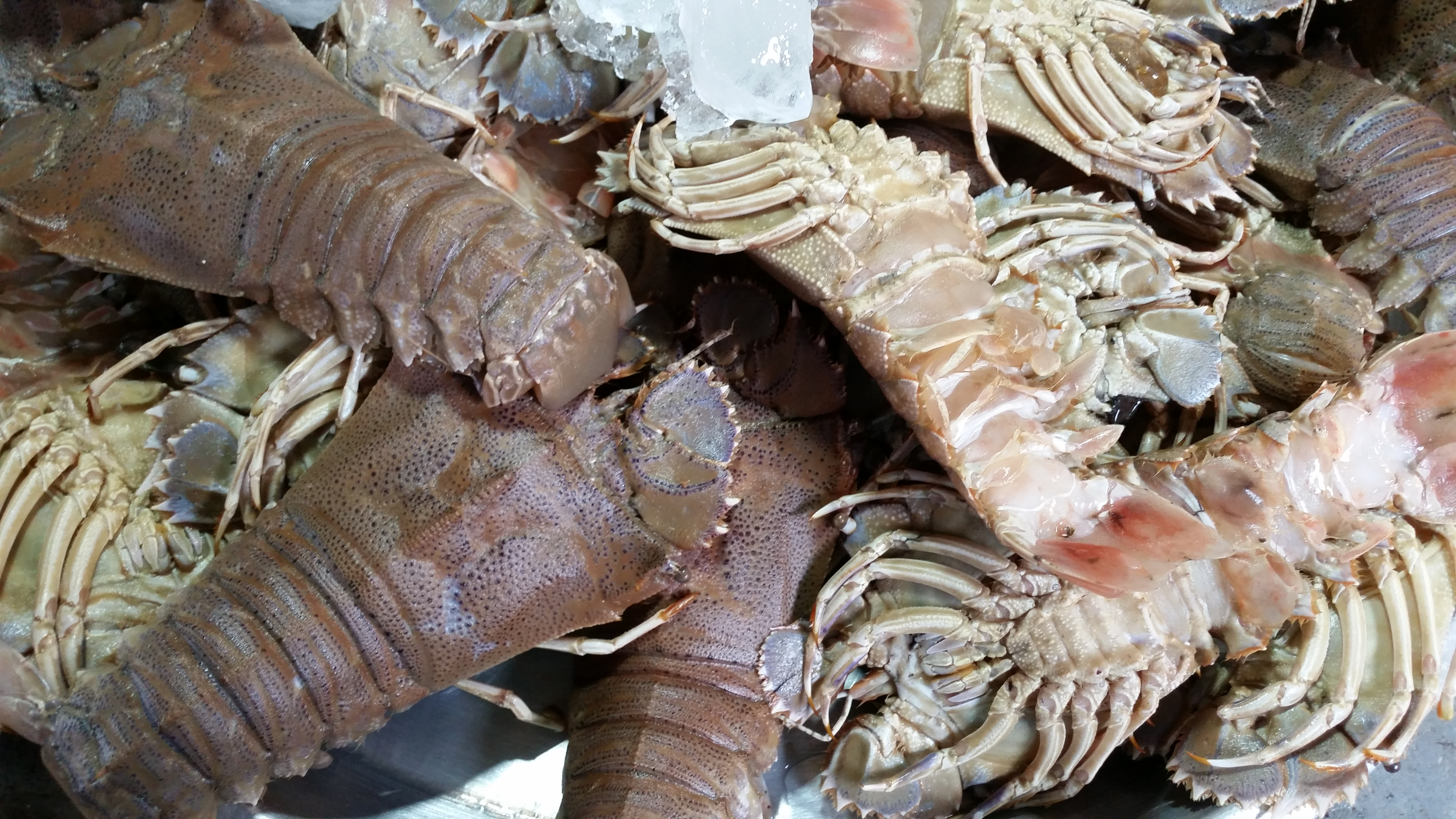
Thenus orientalis at a market in Thailand.

Thenus orientalis has an Indo-West Pacific distribution, ranging from the east coast of Africa (southern Red Sea, to Natal) to China including the Persian Gulf, southern Japan, the Philippines and along the northern coast of Australia from Western Australia to Queensland. They are also caught on a small scale off the shores of Malaysia and Singapore.
