= Bathyarctus =

Scientific classification
- Kingdom: Animalia
- Phylum: Arthropoda
- Class: Malacostraca
- Order: Decapoda
- Suborder: Pleocyemata
- Family: Scyllaridae
- Genus: Bathyarctus; Holthuis, 2002

Genus of crustaceans

Bathyarctus is a genus of slipper lobsters belonging to the family Scyllaridae.

== Species ==
There are 7 species assigned to this genus:

- Bathyarctus andamanicus Yang, Chan & Thein, 2024
- Bathyarctus chani Holthuis, 2002
- Bathyarctus faxoni (Bouvier, 1925)
- Bathyarctus formosanus (Chan & Yu, 1992)
- Bathyarctus ramosae (Tavares, 1997)
- Bathyarctus rubens (Alcock & Anderson, 1894)
- Bathyarctus steatopygus Holthuis, 2002
