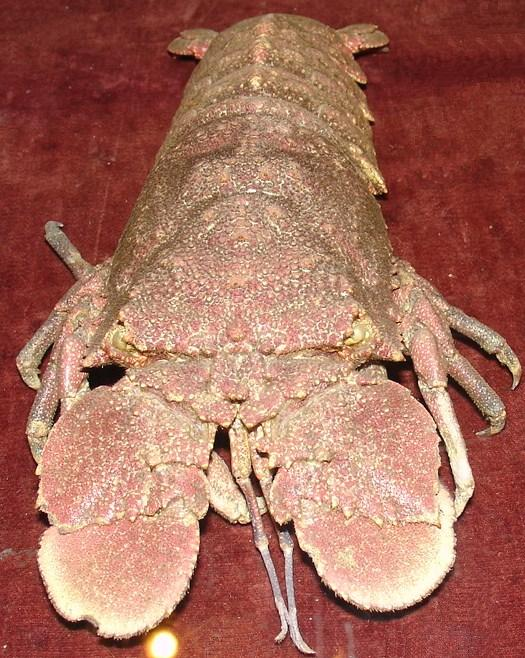
- Arctides antipodarum

Scientific classification
- Kingdom: Animalia
- Phylum: Arthropoda
- Class: Malacostraca
- Order: Decapoda
- Suborder: Pleocyemata
- Family: Scyllaridae
- Subfamily: Arctidinae
- Genus: Arctides; Holthuis, 1960

Species
- Arctides antipodarum Holthuis, 1960; Arctides guineensis (Spengler, 1799); Arctides regalis Holthuis, 1963

= Arctides =

Genus of crustaceans

Arctides is a genus of slipper lobsters, containing three species. The largest of these, A. antipodarum, has a carapace up to 100 millimetres (3.9 in) long, and is found off south-eastern Australia and parts of New Zealand. The other two species are smaller, at up to 70 millimetres (2.8 in) carapace length; A. guineensis is found in an area similar to the Bermuda Triangle; A. regalis is widely distributed in the Indo-Pacific, from the Mascarene Islands to Hawaii and Easter Island.

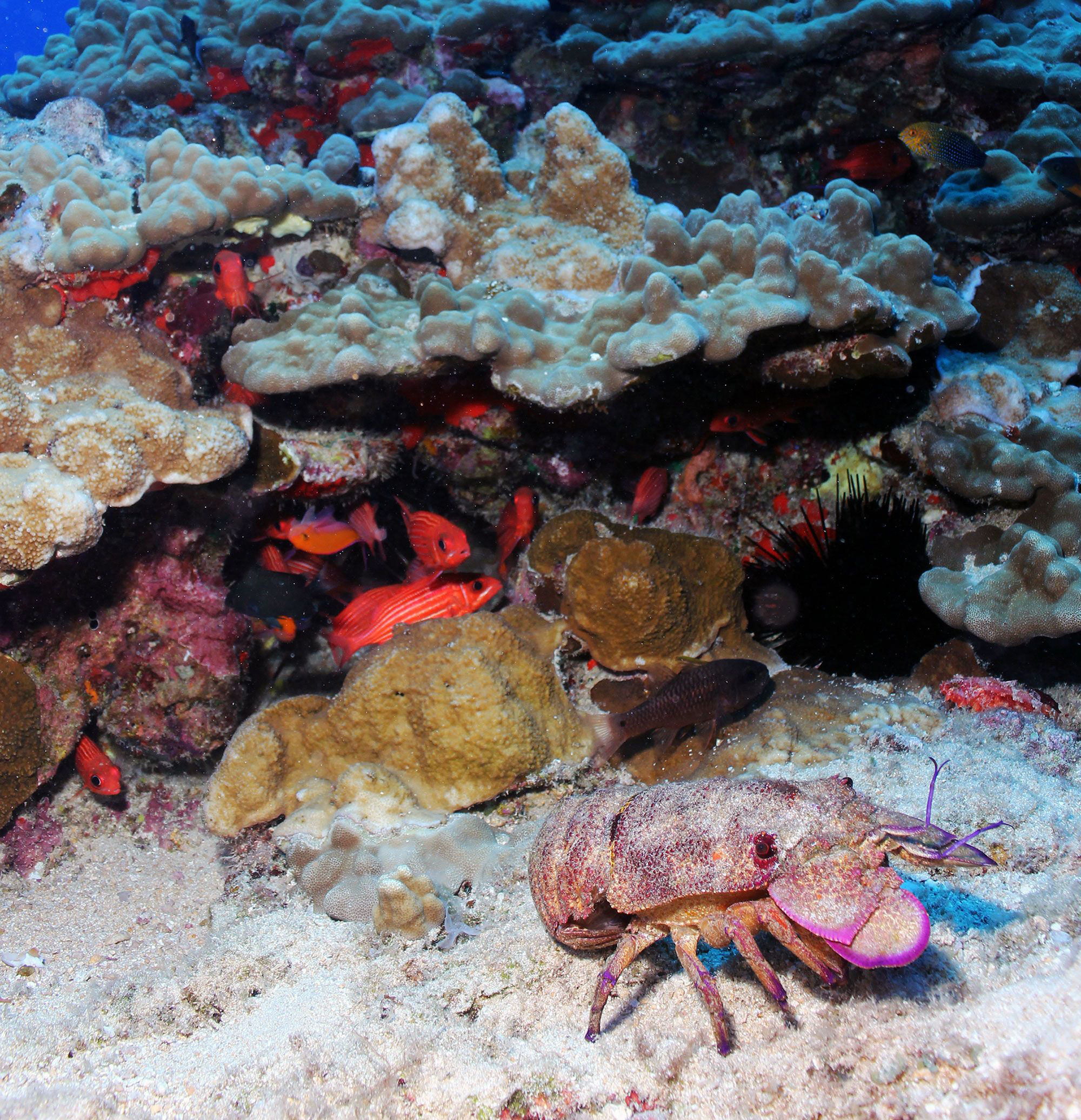
A regal slipper lobster (Arctides regalis) in Hawaii
