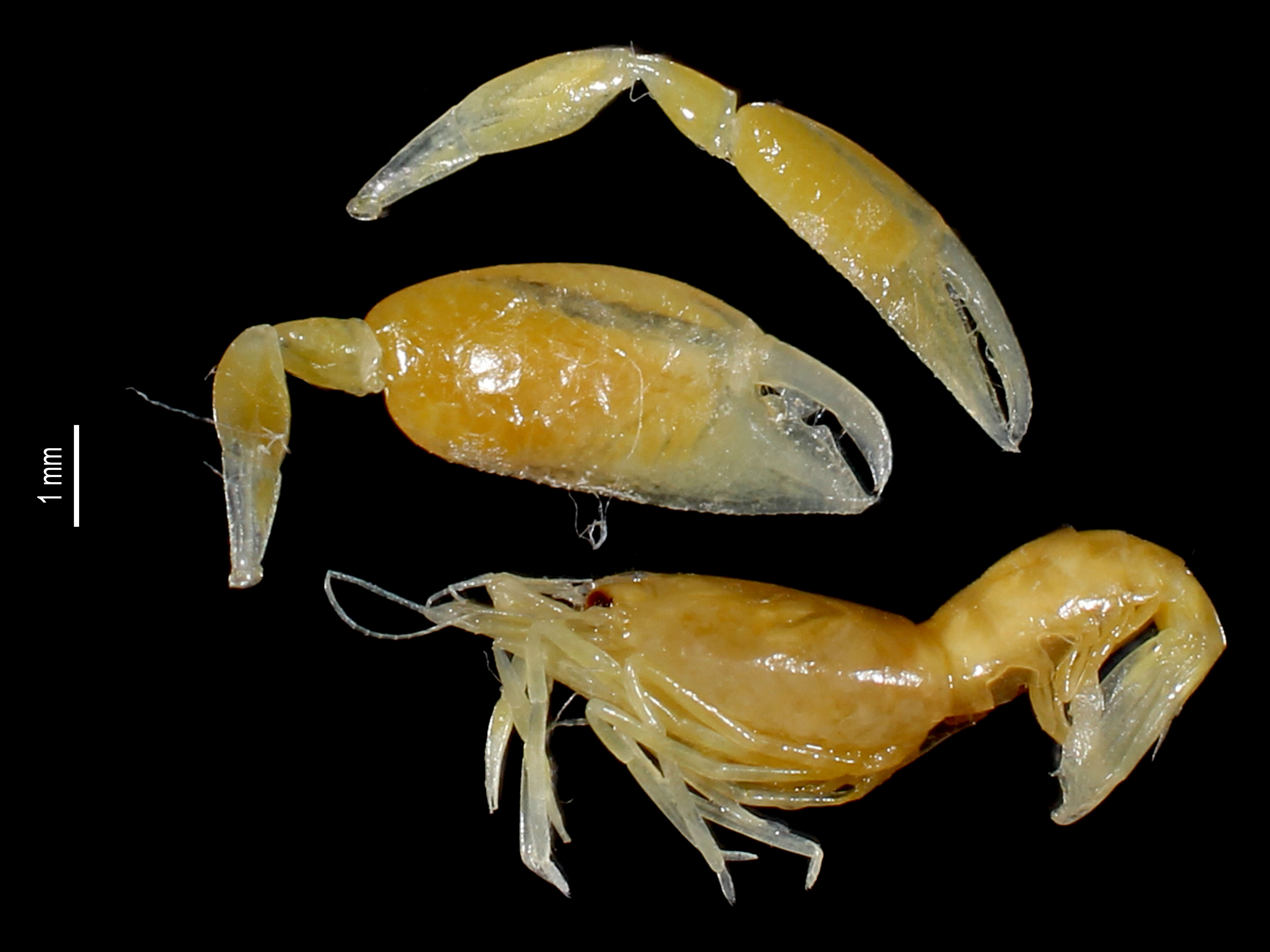
- Dactylonia monnioti

Scientific classification
- Domain: Eukaryota
- Kingdom: Animalia
- Phylum: Arthropoda
- Class: Malacostraca
- Order: Decapoda
- Suborder: Pleocyemata
- Infraorder: Caridea
- Family: Palaemonidae
- Genus: Dactylonia; Fransen, 2002

= Dactylonia =

Genus of crustaceans

Dactylonia is a genus of shrimp in the family Palaemonidae, first described by Charles Fransen in 2002.

WoRMS accepts the following species:

- Dactylonia anachoreta (Kemp, 1922)
- Dactylonia ascidicola (Borradaile, 1898)
- Dactylonia borradalei Bruce, 2005
- Dactylonia carinicula Bruce, 2006
- Dactylonia franseni Bruce, 2003
- Dactylonia holthuisi Fransen, 2002
- Dactylonia monnioti (Bruce, 1990)
- Dactylonia okai (Kemp, 1922)
