= Biarctus =

Scientific classification
- Kingdom: Animalia
- Phylum: Arthropoda
- Class: Malacostraca
- Order: Decapoda
- Suborder: Pleocyemata
- Family: Scyllaridae
- Subfamily: Scyllarinae
- Genus: Biarctus; Holthuis, 2002

Genus of crustaceans

Biarctus is a genus of slipper lobsters belonging to the family Scyllaridae.

== Species ==
- Biarctus dubius (Holthuis, 1963)
- Biarctus pumilus (Nobili, 1906)
- Biarctus sordidus (Stimpson, 1860)
- Biarctus vitiensis (Dana, 1852)
