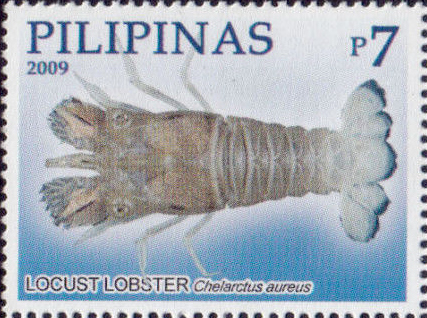
- Chelarctus aureus on 2009 Philippines stamp

Scientific classification
- Kingdom: Animalia
- Phylum: Arthropoda
- Class: Malacostraca
- Order: Decapoda
- Suborder: Pleocyemata
- Family: Scyllaridae
- Genus: Chelarctus; Holthuis, 2002

= Chelarctus =

Genus of crustaceans

Chelarctus is a genus of slipper lobsters belonging to the family Scyllaridae.

== Species ==
- Chelarctus aureus (Holthuis, 1963)
- Chelarctus crosnieri Holthuis, 2002
- Chelarctus cultrifer (Ortmann, 1897)
- Chelarctus virgosus Yang & Chan, 2012
