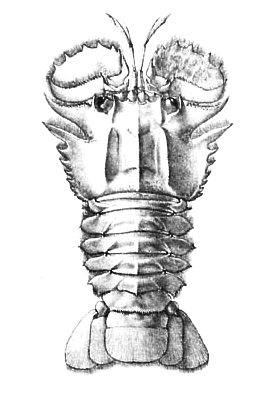

Conservation status
- Least Concern (IUCN 3.1)

Scientific classification
- Kingdom: Animalia
- Phylum: Arthropoda
- Clade: Pancrustacea
- Class: Malacostraca
- Order: Decapoda
- Suborder: Pleocyemata
- Family: Scyllaridae
- Genus: Ibacus
- Species: I. alticrenatus

Binomial name
- Ibacus alticrenatus Spence Bate, 1888

= Ibacus alticrenatus =

Species of crustacean

Ibacus alticrenatus is a species of slipper lobster that lives in the waters of Australia and New Zealand.

== Description ==
Ibacus alticrenatus is one of the smaller species of Ibacus. Males reach a maximum carapace length of 55 millimetres (2.2 in), with females slightly larger, at up to 65 mm (2.6 in). The maximum total length is 16 centimetres (6.3 in). There are typically 8, but occasionally 7 or 9, teeth along either edge of the carapace, behind the cervical incision.

== Distribution ==
Around Australia, I. alticrenatus is found from the North West Cape in Western Australia, around the country's south coast, to 20° south in northern Queensland. Although I. brucei has also been recorded from the Kermadec Islands and the West Norfolk Ridge, I. alticrenatus is the only slipper lobster to occur around the main islands of New Zealand.

== Life cycle ==
Females reach sexual maturity at a median carapace length of 39 millimetres (1.5 in). They produce between 1700 and 14,800 eggs, with diameters of 0.94–1.29 mm (0.04–0.05 in). The eggs are incubated on the female's pleopods for 3–4 months before hatching; this occurs from April to October, with rates peaking in July. The larvae pass through seven flattened phyllosoma stages over 4–6 months, growing from around 2.5 mm (0.1 in) to around 40 mm (1.6 in). The succeeding moult is accompanied by a metamorphosis into the juveniles form (known as the "puerulus" or "nisto" stage), which much more closely resembles the adult form. There is a final "post-puerulus" stage before the animal reaches adulthood.

== Taxonomy ==
Ibacus alticrenatus was first described in 1888 by Charles Spence Bate. The type locality was Station 167 of the Challenger expedition, at a depth of 150 fathoms (900 ft; 270 m), at 39°32′S 171°48′E. Four syntypes are held in the Natural History Museum in London.

Common names for the species include "deep water bug" (Australia), "sandy bug" (Australia), "prawn killer" (New Zealand) and "velvet fan lobster", the last being the name preferred by the Food and Agriculture Organization.

== Ecology and conservation ==
Ibacus alticrenatus lives at depths of 20–455 m (66–1,493 ft), on soft, muddy bottoms, where it can bury itself in the sediment.

The highest total landing in New Zealand for any fishing season was 49.12 t in 1992–1993. I. alticrenatus was added to New Zealand's Quota Management System on October 1, 2007, and the total allowable catch was set to 37.4 t. The majority of the catch is taken in the area to the north of North Island. Because of its wide range, Ibacus alticrenatus is listed as Least Concern on the IUCN Red List.
