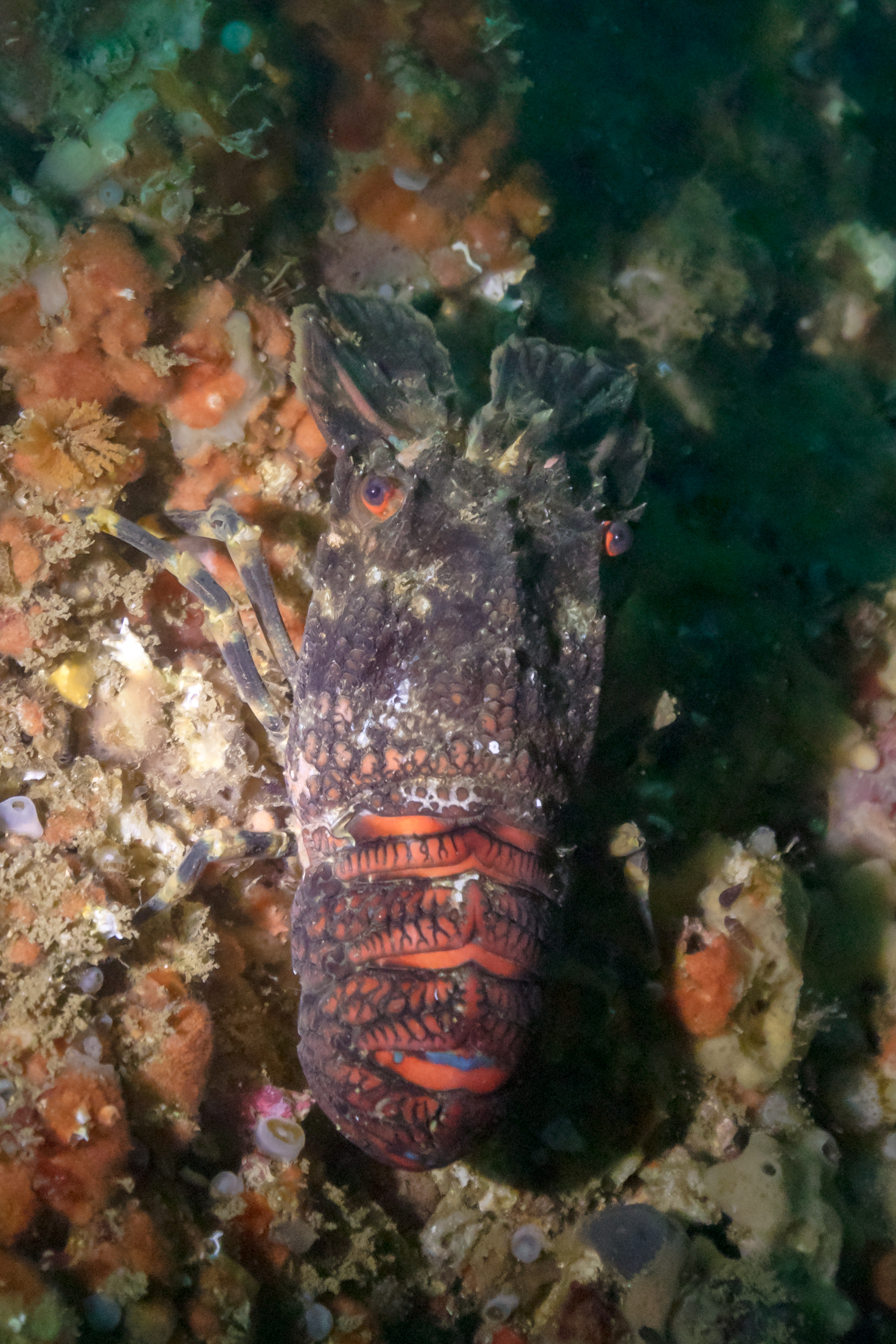

Conservation status
- Least Concern (IUCN 3.1)

Scientific classification
- Kingdom: Animalia
- Phylum: Arthropoda
- Clade: Pancrustacea
- Class: Malacostraca
- Order: Decapoda
- Suborder: Pleocyemata
- Family: Scyllaridae
- Genus: Scyllarus
- Species: S. arctus

Binomial name
- Scyllarus arctus (Linnaeus, 1758)

Synonyms
- Arctus arctus De Haan, 1849; Arctus crenulatus Bouvier, 1905; Arctus ursus Dana, 1852; Astacus arctus Pennant, 1777; Cancer Arctus Linnaeus, 1758; Cancer (Astacus) ursus minor Herbst, 1793; Chrysoma mediterraneum Risso, 1827; Nisto asper Sarato, 1885; Phyllosoma mediterraneum Hope, 1851; Phyllosoma sarniense Lukis, 1835; Phyllosoma parthenopaeum Costa, 1840; Scyllarus tridentatus Leach, 1814; Scyllarus cicada Risso, 1816; Scyllarus (Arctus) crenulatus Bouvier, 1915; Yalomus depressus Rafinesque MS in Holthuis, 1985

= Scyllarus arctus =

Species of slipper lobster

Scyllarus arctus is a species of slipper lobster which lives in the Mediterranean Sea and eastern Atlantic Ocean. It is uncommon in British and Irish waters, but a number of English-language vernacular names have been applied, including small European locust lobster, lesser slipper lobster and broad lobster.

== Distribution ==
Scyllarus arctus is found throughout the Mediterranean Sea, and in eastern parts of the Atlantic Ocean, from the Azores, Madeira and the Canary Islands as far north as the English Channel. The species is rare north of the Bay of Biscay; several specimens have been seen in British waters, but nonetheless, S. arctus is rarer in Britain than the giant squid, Architeuthis dux. Until 1960, S. arctus was thought to be the only species of Scyllarus in the Mediterranean Sea, but then it was realised that the lesser known Scyllarus pygmaeus is also present throughout much of the Mediterranean Sea.

== Description ==
Scyllarus arctus may reach up to 16 centimetres (6.3 in) long, although sizes of 5–10 cm (2.0–3.9 in) are more typical. It is reddish-brown in colour, with a dark brown spot in the centre of each abdominal somite, although this is not sharply defined. The pereiopods have a dark blue ring around each segment. It can be told apart from its close relative Scyllarus pygmaeus, which lives sympatrically with S. arctus, chiefly by its larger size, but also by other features such as the shape of a tubercle on the last thoracic sternite; this is flattened in S. arctus, but conical in S. pygmaeus. S. arctus has among the smallest measured genome sizes in the Order Decapoda, at less than a third of that seen in the related genus Scyllarides.

== Ecology ==
Scyllarus arctus is susceptible to white spot syndrome, and is predated upon by a wide range of demersal fish. It lives at depths of 4–50 m on muddy or rocky substrates, and in Posidonia meadows. It is the subject of small scale fishery, but its scarcity and its small size make it an unattractive target.
