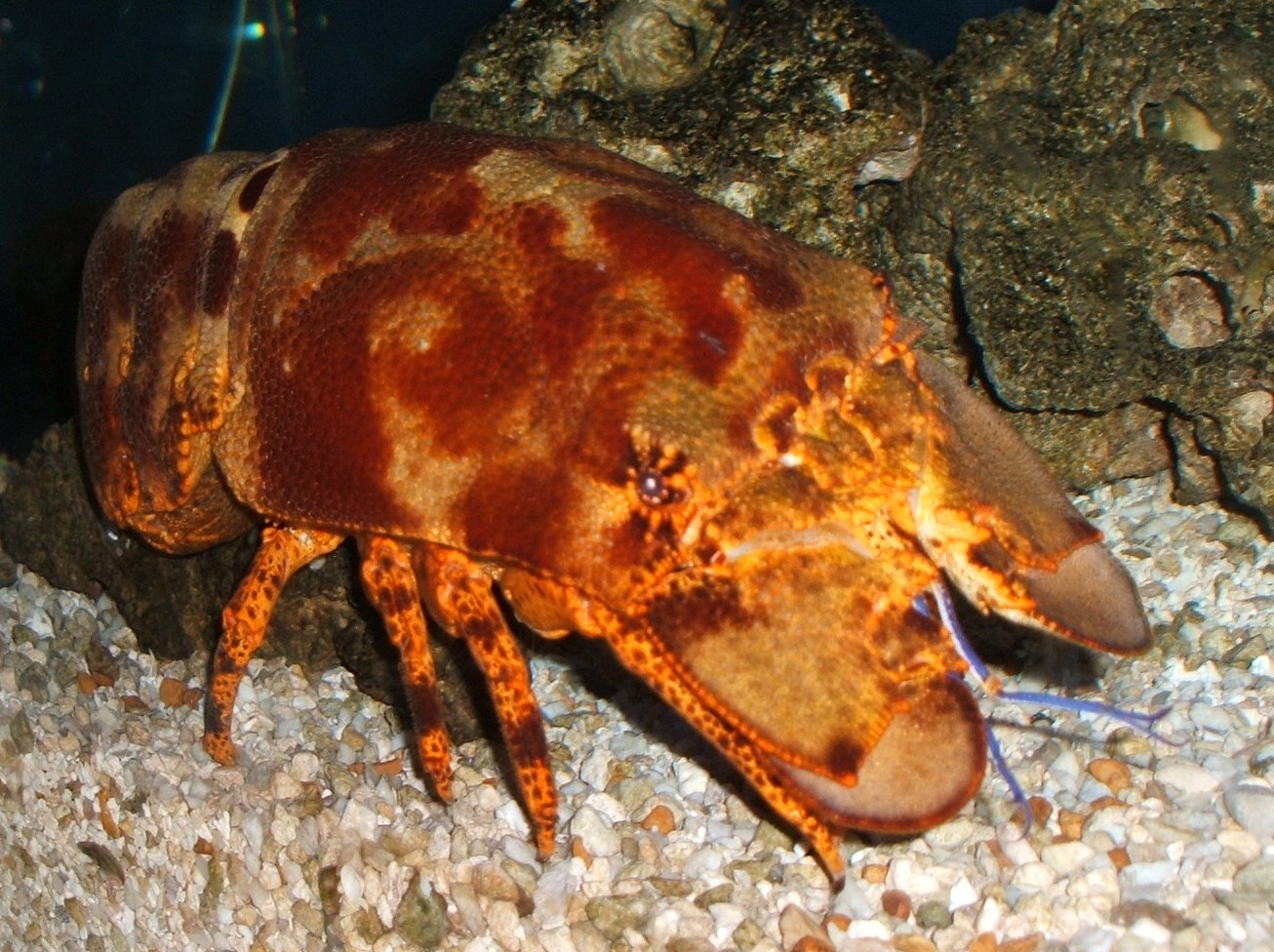
- Parribacus antarcticus

Scientific classification
- Kingdom: Animalia
- Phylum: Arthropoda
- Class: Malacostraca
- Order: Decapoda
- Suborder: Pleocyemata
- Family: Scyllaridae
- Subfamily: Ibacinae
- Genus: Parribacus; Dana, 1852

Species
- P. antarcticus Lund, 1793; P. caledonicus Holthuis, 1960; P. holthuisi Forest, 1954; P. japonicus Holthuis, 1960; P. perlatus Holthuis, 1967; P. scarlatinus Holthuis, 1960

= Parribacus =

Genus of crustaceans

Parribacus is a genus of slipper lobsters, containing six species, all of which are used locally as human food sources.
