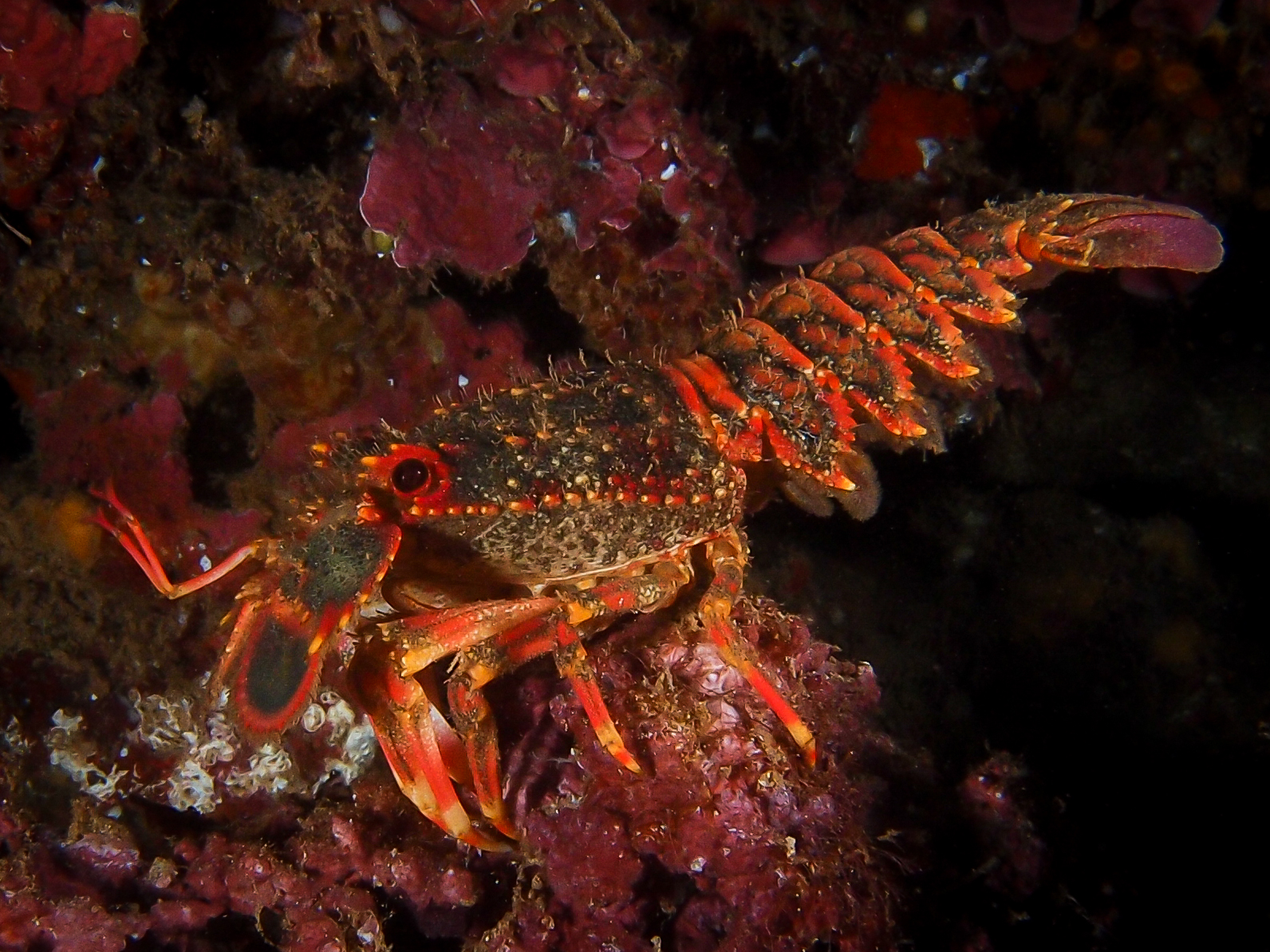

Scientific classification
- Kingdom: Animalia
- Phylum: Arthropoda
- Class: Malacostraca
- Order: Decapoda
- Suborder: Pleocyemata
- Family: Scyllaridae
- Genus: Arctides
- Species: A. regalis

Binomial name
- Arctides regalis Holthuis, 1963

= Arctides regalis =

Species of crustacean

Arctides regalis is a species of slipper lobster found in the tropical Indo-Pacific region. It was initially thought to be the same species as A. guineensis, but has since been renamed after Mary Eleanore King. Its common name is royal Spanish lobster and it is known as ula-papapa in Hawaii. The species is assessed as Least Concern in the IUCN Red List of Threatened Species.

== Description ==
Articdes regalis has a dark red coloration, and is covered in black bristles. As part of the family Scyllaridae, Articdes regalis share the common trait of antennae in the shape of paddles. Their average overall length is 17 cm. Carapace length of female specimens ranges from 41 to 55 mm, while for male specimens it ranges from 40 to 49 mm.

Articdes regalis often feed on snails, clams, shrimps, and crabs. To open its prey, the lobster moves it's dactyli in a wedging motion and extracts the body. They are reported to run from divers during the day and are described as shy creatures. As they become more sociable at night, they are considered to be nocturnal.

== Distribution & Habitat ==
Arctides regalis is found in the tropical Indo-Pacific region, including multiple African, Asian, and Oceanic countries. It is a benthic species. Due to its orange-red coloring it often blends in with Tubastraea coral that grows in its hiding place. During the day, they hide in groups on the walls and ceilings of underwater caves. At nights, scuba divers have reported sightings of the lobsters at depths of 5 to 50 meters in coral reefs.

== Human use ==
=== Aquarium trade ===
Arctides regalis can be kept in an aquarium with free-swimming fish, but it should be the only one of its species in the tank because they do not get along. They are sought after for their vivid colors uncommon for slipper lobsters.
