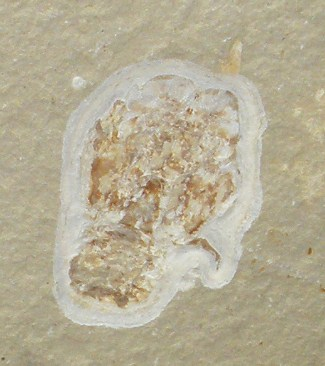

Scientific classification
- Kingdom: Animalia
- Phylum: Arthropoda
- Clade: Pancrustacea
- Class: Malacostraca
- Order: Decapoda
- Suborder: Pleocyemata
- Family: Scyllaridae
- Subfamily: Ibacinae
- Genus: †Palibacus; Förster, 1984
- Species: †P. praecursor

Binomial name
- †Palibacus praecursor (Dames, 1886)

Synonyms
- Ibacus praecursor Dames, 1886

= Palibacus =

Palibacus Temporal range: Cenomanian

Extinct genus of crustaceans

Palibacus praecursor is a fossil species of slipper lobster, the only species in the genus Palibacus. It was found in Cenomanian (Cretaceous) deposits at Hakel, Lebanon and described in 1886 by the German palaeontologist W. Dames. Its similarity to modern slipper lobsters demonstrates that the main features of that group had already evolved by the mid-Cretaceous.
