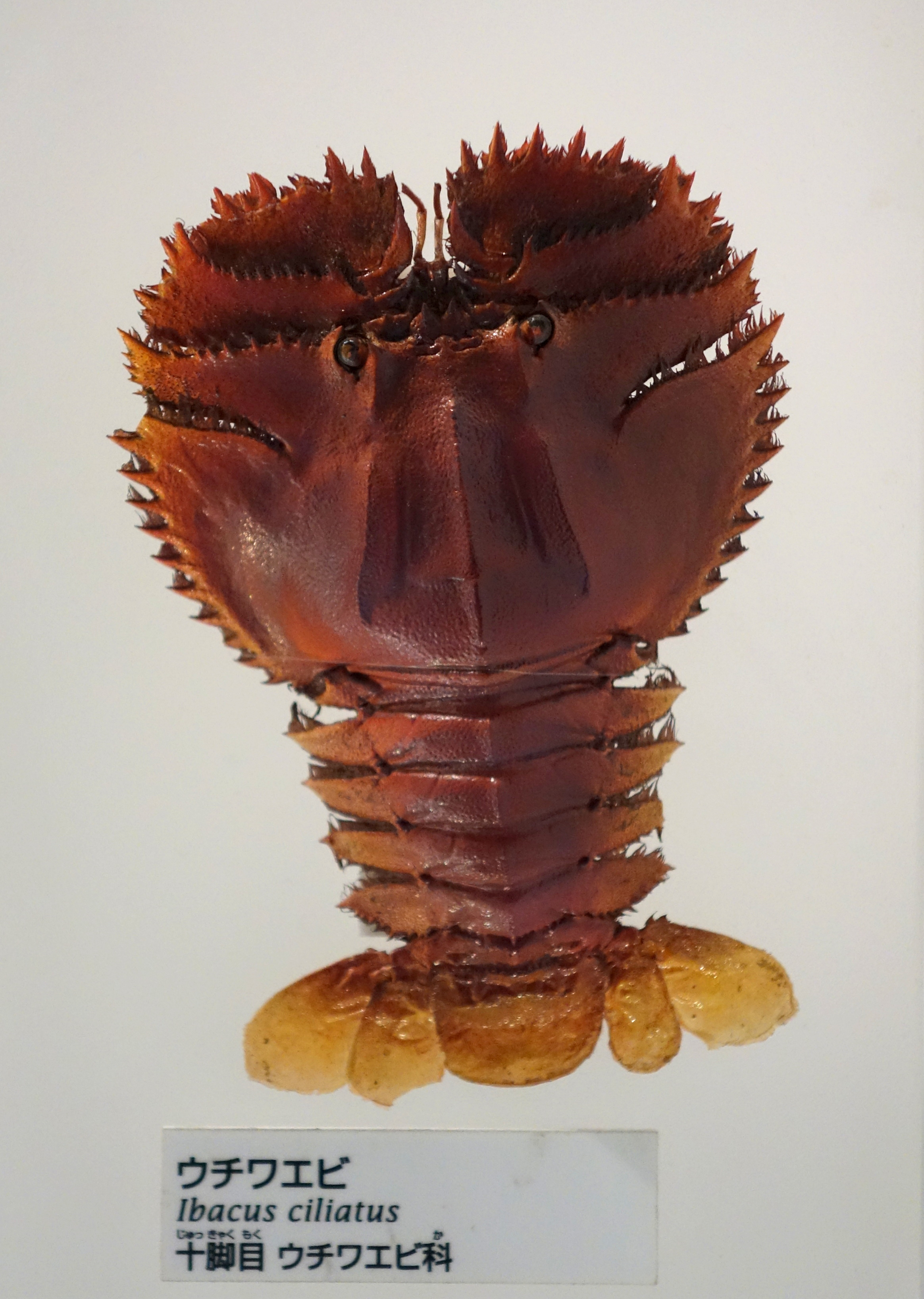

Conservation status
- Data Deficient (IUCN 3.1)

Scientific classification
- Kingdom: Animalia
- Phylum: Arthropoda
- Class: Malacostraca
- Order: Decapoda
- Suborder: Pleocyemata
- Family: Scyllaridae
- Genus: Ibacus
- Species: I. ciliatus

Binomial name
- Ibacus ciliatus (von Siebold, 1824)

Synonyms
- Scyllarus ciliatus von Siebold, 1824

= Ibacus ciliatus =

Species of crustacean

Ibacus ciliatus is a species of slipper lobster from the north-west Pacific Ocean.

== Description and life cycle ==
Ibacus ciliatus is a broad slipper lobster, with a carapace length of up to 80 millimetres (3.1 in), and a total length up to 23 centimetres (9.1 in). It is typically a uniform reddish brown in colour; the tail fan (uropods and telson) can be a browner or a yellower hue. I. ciliatus is very similar to Ibacus pubescens, and can only be distinguished by the lack of pubescence (hairiness) on the carapace, and by the number of teeth along the edges of the carapace; in I. ciliatus there are typically 11 (occasionally 10 or 12), while in I. pubescens there are typically 12 (ranging from 11 to 14).

The larvae of I. ciliatus are the typical phyllosoma larvae found in all slipper lobsters and spiny lobsters. The first phyllosoma is around 3 mm (0.12 in) across, with later stages, sometimes known as "giant phyllosomas", reaching up to 37.5 mm (1.48 in).

== Distribution and ecology ==
Ibacus ciliatus occurs in the western Pacific Ocean from the Philippines to the Korean Peninsula and southern Japan (south of Niigata on the west coast and Tokyo Bay on the east coast). It is the only species of Ibacus not known to occur around the coast of Australia. Ibacus ciliatus lives on soft substrates at depths of 49–324 metres (161–1,063 ft), at temperatures of 14–24 °C (57–75 °F).

== Fishery and conservation ==
Records of a fishery for I. ciliatus reach back to 1830, when Heinrich Bürger noted that it was on sale daily in the fish markets around Nagasaki. It is now harvested throughout its range, although there is little data on the quantities being caught. FAO fisheries statistics report captures of around 1,600 tonnes (3,500,000 lb) for most years since 2000, with an increase to 9,114 t (20,093,000 lb) for 2010. Due to the limited knowledge of the species, it has been assessed as Data Deficient on the IUCN Red List.

== Taxonomy ==
Ibacus ciliatus was first described in 1824 by Philipp Franz von Siebold in De Historiae Naturalis in Japonia statu ("On the Natural History of the State of Japan"), under the name "Scyllarus ciliatus". His holotype was deposited at the Rijksmuseum van Natuurlijke Historie in the Netherlands. It was transferred to the genus Ibacus in 1841 by Wilhem de Haan. A former subspecies of I. ciliatus, "I. ciliatus pubescens", is now accorded the rank of full species, as Ibacus pubescens.

The official Japanese name for the species is utiwaebi (ウチワエビ), meaning "fan lobster". In Thailand, it is known as kung kradan deng, while in the Philippines, the names pitik-pitik (Hiligaynon and Cebuano) and cupapa (Surigaonon) are used. The English vernacular name preferred by the Food and Agriculture Organization (FAO) is "Japanese fan lobster".
