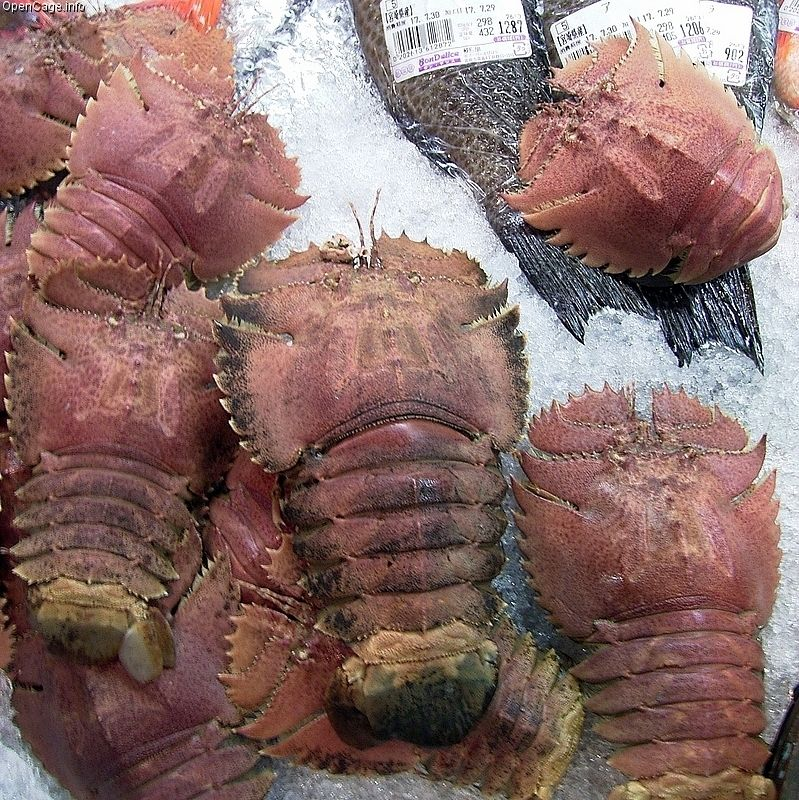
- Ibacus novemdentatus

Scientific classification
- Kingdom: Animalia
- Phylum: Arthropoda
- Class: Malacostraca
- Order: Decapoda
- Suborder: Pleocyemata
- Family: Scyllaridae
- Subfamily: Ibacinae
- Genus: Ibacus; Leach, 1815

Species
- Ibacus alticrenatus Bate, 1888; Ibacus brevipes Bate, 1888; Ibacus brucei Holthuis, 1977; Ibacus chacei Brown & Holthuis, 1998; Ibacus ciliatus (von Siebold, 1824); Ibacus novemdentatus Gibbes, 1850; Ibacus peronii Leach, 1815; Ibacus pubescens Holthuis, 1960

= Ibacus =

Genus of crustaceans

Ibacus is a genus of slipper lobsters, including commercially important species such as the Balmain bug, Ibacus peronii.
