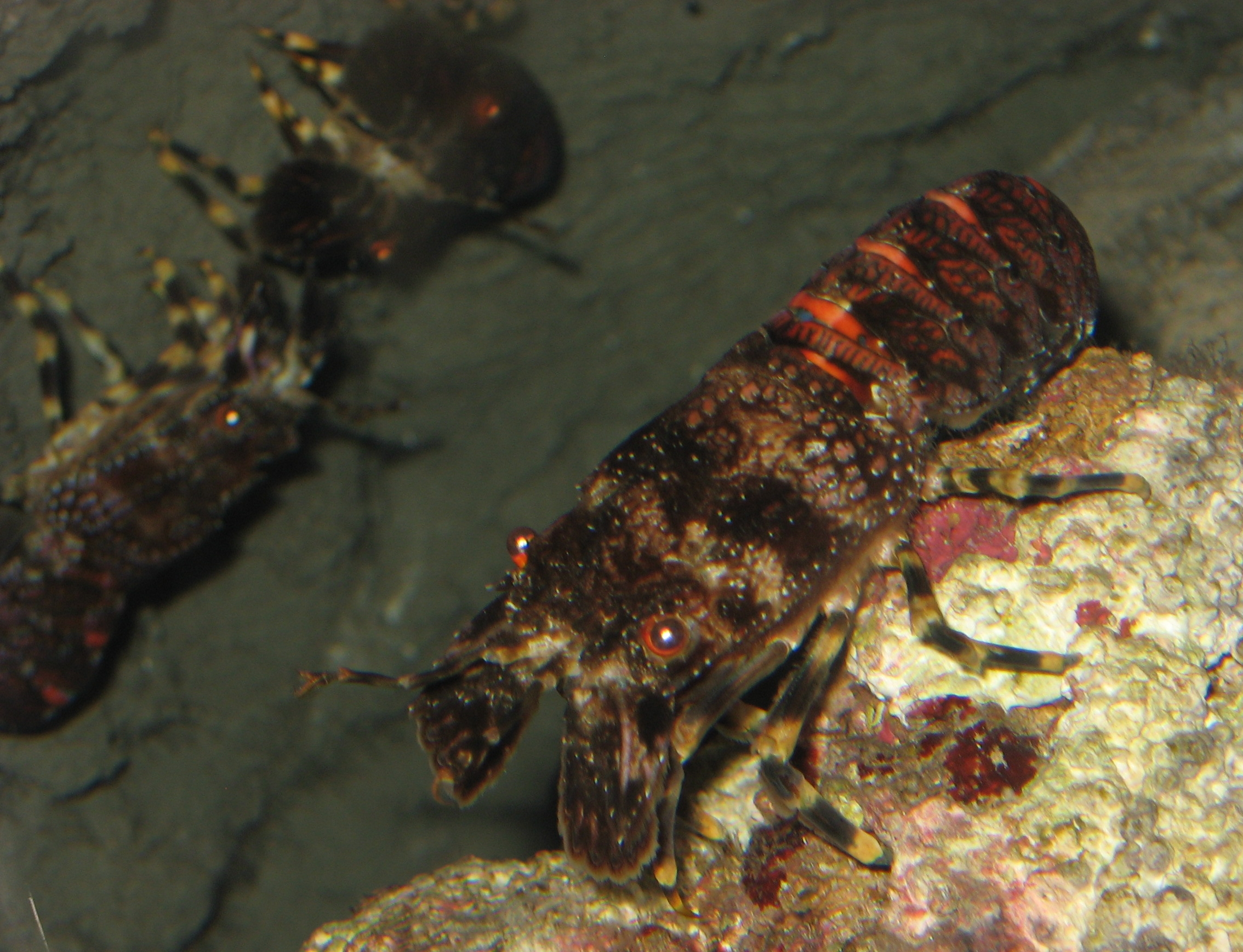
- Scyllarus arctus

Scientific classification
- Kingdom: Animalia
- Phylum: Arthropoda
- Class: Malacostraca
- Order: Decapoda
- Suborder: Pleocyemata
- Family: Scyllaridae
- Subfamily: Scyllarinae
- Genus: Scyllarus; Fabricius, 1775

Type species
- Cancer arctus Linnaeus, 1758

= Scyllarus =

Genus of crustaceans

Scyllarus is a genus of slipper lobsters from the Atlantic Ocean, including the Mediterranean and Caribbean. Until 2002, the genus included far more species, but these are now placed in other genera. The following species remain in Scyllarus:

- Scyllarus americanus (Smith, 1869)
- Scyllarus arctus (Linnaeus, 1758)
- Scyllarus caparti Holthuis, 1952
- Scyllarus chacei Holthuis, 1960
- Scyllarus depressus (Smith, 1881)
- Scyllarus paradoxus Miers, 1881
- Scyllarus planorbis Holthuis, 1969
- Scyllarus pygmaeus (Bate, 1888)
- Scyllarus subarctus Crosnier, 1970
