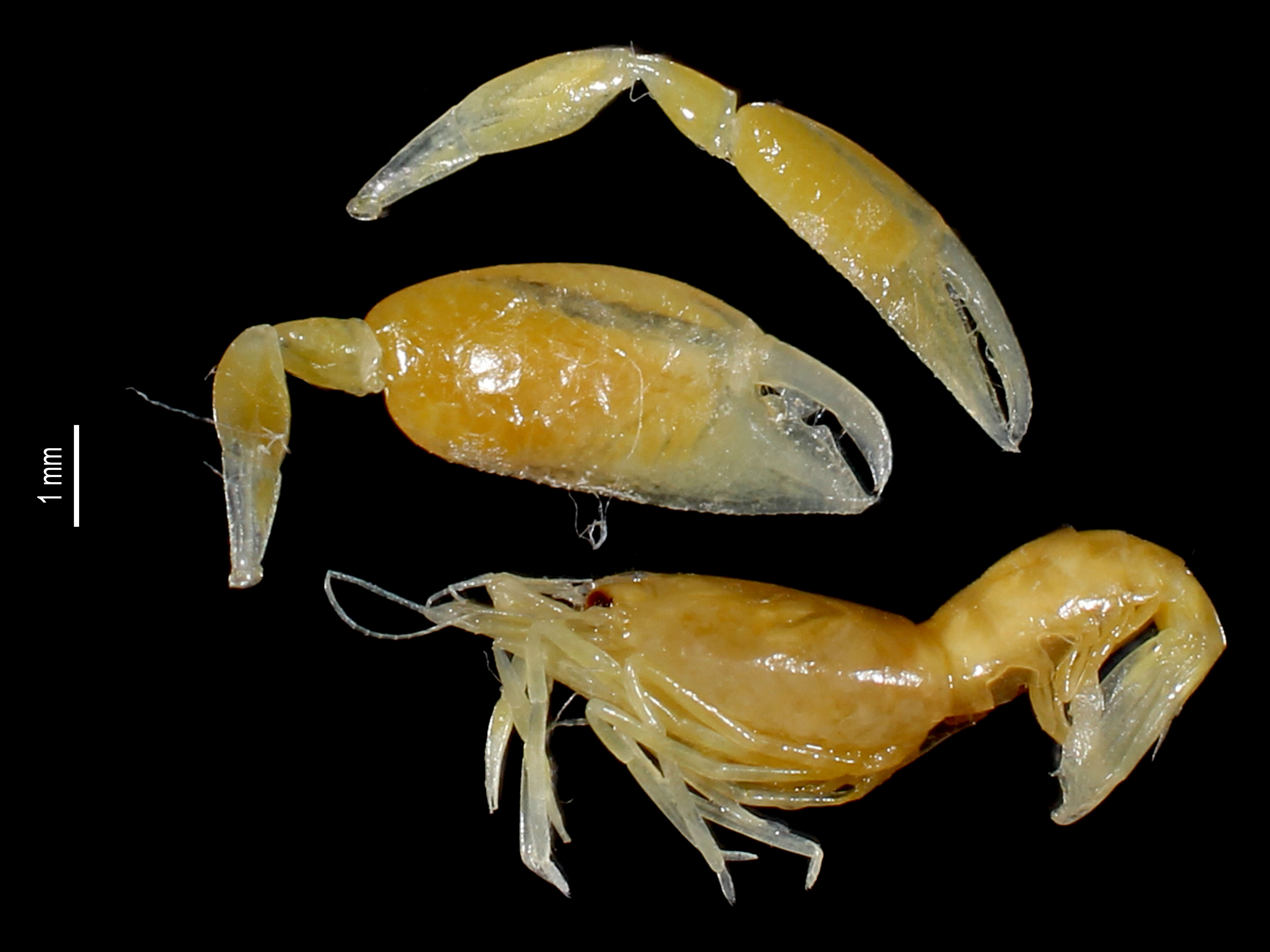

Scientific classification
- Kingdom: Animalia
- Phylum: Arthropoda
- Clade: Pancrustacea
- Class: Malacostraca
- Order: Decapoda
- Suborder: Pleocyemata
- Infraorder: Caridea
- Family: Palaemonidae
- Genus: Dactylonia
- Species: D. monnioti

Binomial name
- Dactylonia monnioti (Bruce, 1990)

Synonyms
- Pontonia monnioti Bruce, 1990

= Dactylonia monnioti =

Species of crustacean

Dactylonia monnioti is a small shrimp in the family Palaemonidae, first described by Alexander James Bruce. The species epithet honours Claude Monniot who was responsible for finding the species.

Dactylonia monnioti is only known from New Caledonia, and is a benthic species dwelling at depths of 260 - 285 metres.
