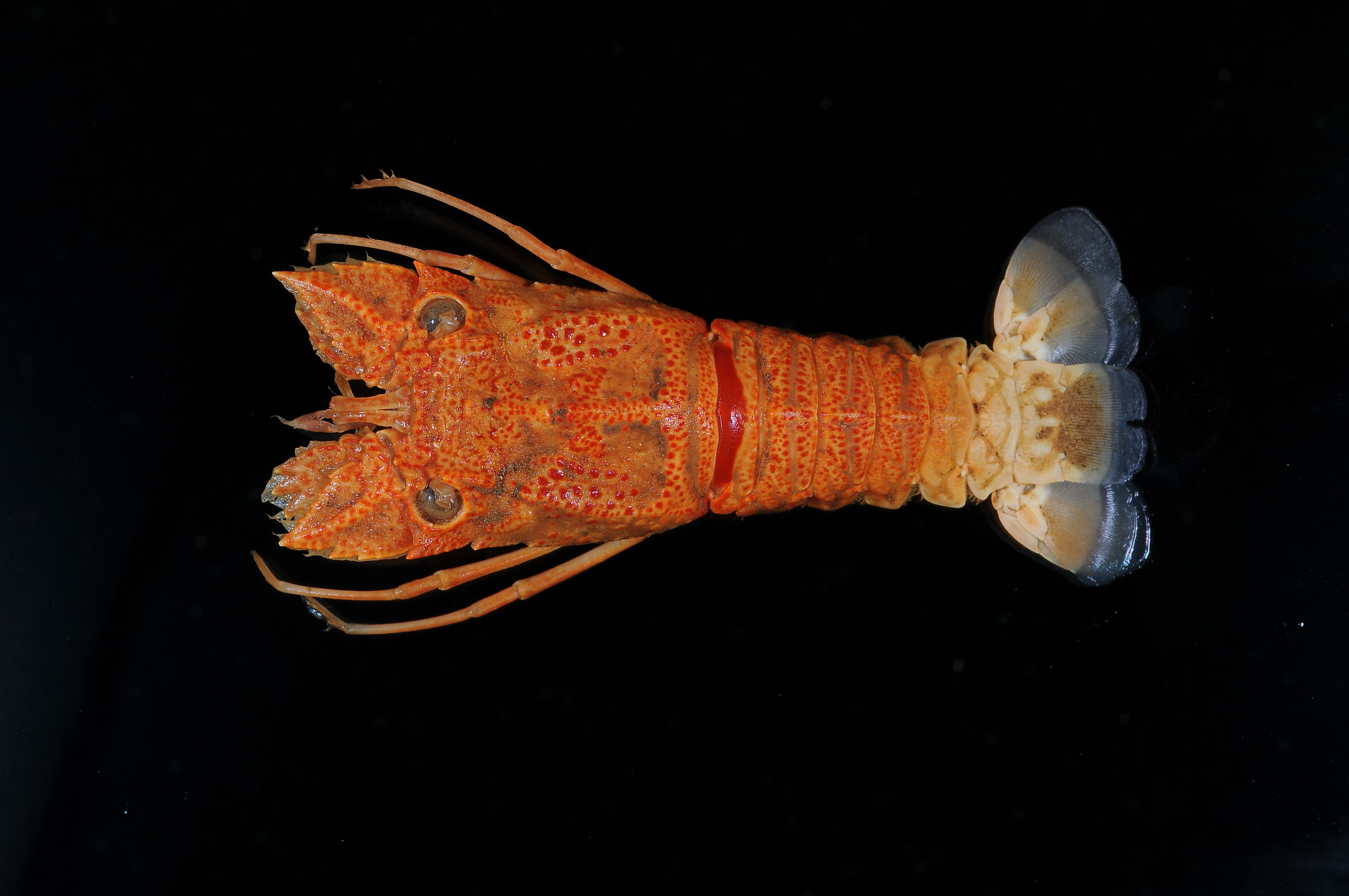
- Scammarctus batei

Scientific classification
- Kingdom: Animalia
- Phylum: Arthropoda
- Class: Malacostraca
- Order: Decapoda
- Suborder: Pleocyemata
- Family: Scyllaridae
- Subfamily: Scyllarinae
- Genus: Scammarctus; Holthuis, 2002

= Scammarctus =

Genus of crustaceans

Scammarctus is a genus of crustaceans belonging to the family Scyllaridae.

The species of this genus are found in Indian Ocean.

Species:

- Scammarctus batei (Holthuis, 1946)
