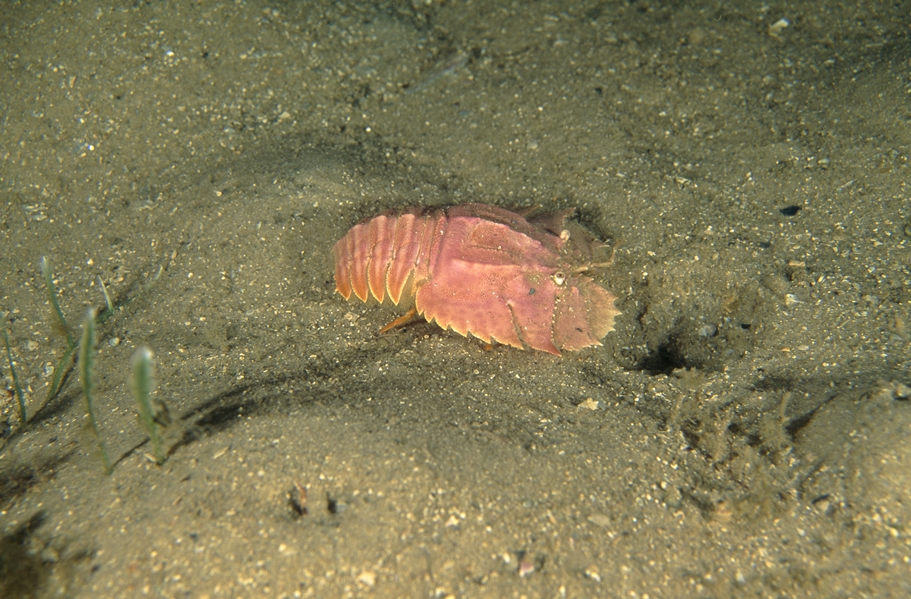

Conservation status
- Least Concern (IUCN 3.1)

Scientific classification
- Kingdom: Animalia
- Phylum: Arthropoda
- Class: Malacostraca
- Order: Decapoda
- Suborder: Pleocyemata
- Family: Scyllaridae
- Genus: Ibacus
- Species: I. peronii

Binomial name
- Ibacus peronii Leach, 1815

= Ibacus peronii =

Species of crustacean

Ibacus peronii, commonly known as the Balmain bug (often shortened to just bug) or butterfly fan lobster, is a species of slipper lobster. It lives in shallow waters around Australia and is the subject of small-scale fishery. It is a flattened, reddish brown animal, up to 23 cm (9 in) long and 14 cm (6 in) wide, with flattened antennae and no claws.

== Description ==
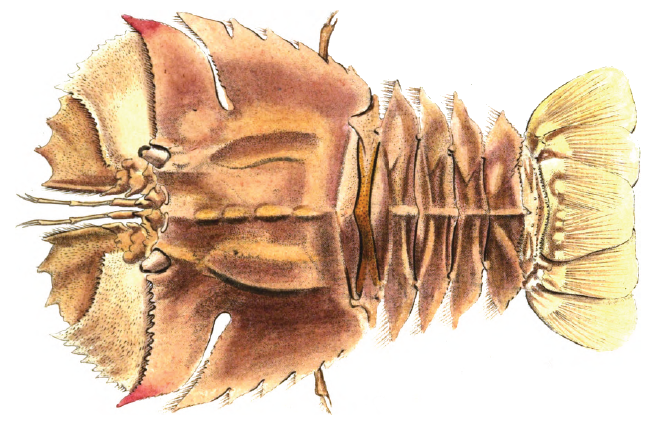

In common with other slipper lobsters, Ibacus peronii has a broad, flattened body and a large carapace. The carapace is reddish brown, and reaches lengths of 2–10 centimetres (0.8–3.9 in), with the whole animal able to reach a length of 23 cm (9 in), and a width of 10–14 cm (3.9–5.5 in). The antennae are also long and broad, and the flattened form of the whole animal allows it to partly penetrate itself in soft substrates. They have five pairs of legs and no claws. Captured animals typically weigh around 120 grams (4.2 oz), but the weight can range from 80 to 200 g (2.8 to 7.1 oz).

Female Ibacus peronii grows faster and reaches larger sizes in comparison to male Ibacus peronii. The size of female Ibacus peronii is significant because there is a linear relationship between the fecundity and the carapace length.

The species is often confused with the Moreton Bay bug, Thenus orientalis, but they can be distinguished by the placement of the eyes: the eyes of I. peronii are near the claws, while those of T. orientalis are at the margin of the legs.

== Distribution and ecology ==
It is found at depths of 20–450 metres (66–1,476 ft) off the coast of Australia from Southport in Queensland to Geraldton in Western Australia. A further population exists in Western Australia from Port Hedland to Broome. A Specimen was found in Port Phillip bay in July 2016.

Ibacus peronii is nocturnal and feeds on algae and small crustaceans. They often spend the daytime buried in sand or mud.

== Fishery ==
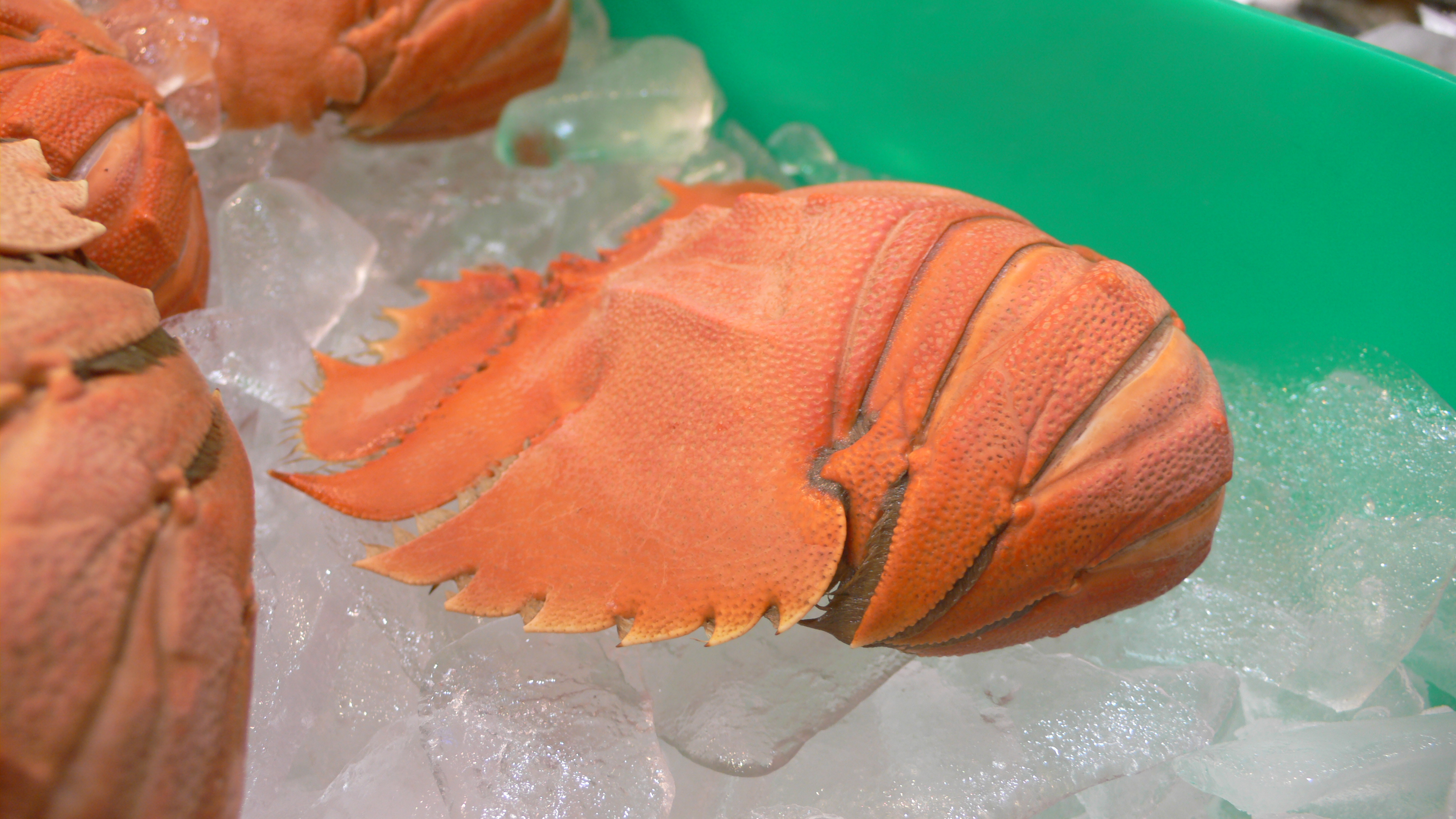
A cooked Balmain bug

Ibacus peronii is the most commercially important species in the genus Ibacus. Only wild-caught Ibacus peronii are available, although some research into aquaculture is ongoing. The fishery for I. peronii is focussed around New South Wales, where it is mainly caught as bycatch of trawling for fish and prawns. There is a peak in supply in January and February, and the price is highest in areas where it is caught, because of its increased familiarity and popularity there. I. peronii is almost always available at fish markets in Sydney.

The flesh of I. peronii is sometimes reported as tasting of garlic, which makes the species less desirable than the Moreton Bay bug, Thenus orientalis, for cooking. Only the tail contains edible meat. Small individuals yield 30% meat, while larger animals, which have proportionally smaller tails, have lower yields.

== Naming ==
The species Ibacus peronii was described by William Elford Leach in 1815, based on material collected by François Péron. Péron had labelled the animal Scyllarus incisus, and had previously called it Scyllarus kingiensis. Although the type locality was given simply as "New Holland" (now Australia), historical records demonstrate that the animal was caught off King Island, in the Bass Strait between Tasmania and the Australian mainland.

Common names used in Australia for Ibacus peronii include Balmain bug (after the inner Sydney suburb of Balmain), Eastern Balmain bug, butterfly lobster, flapjack, Péron's Ibacus crab, sand crayfish, sand lobster, southern shovel-nosed lobster, prawn killer and squagga, although the last two are not in current use. The named preferred by the Food and Agriculture Organization is butterfly fan lobster. Although it is most widely known as the "Balmain bug", three other species of Ibacus share that name.

== See also ==
- Balmain, New South Wales
