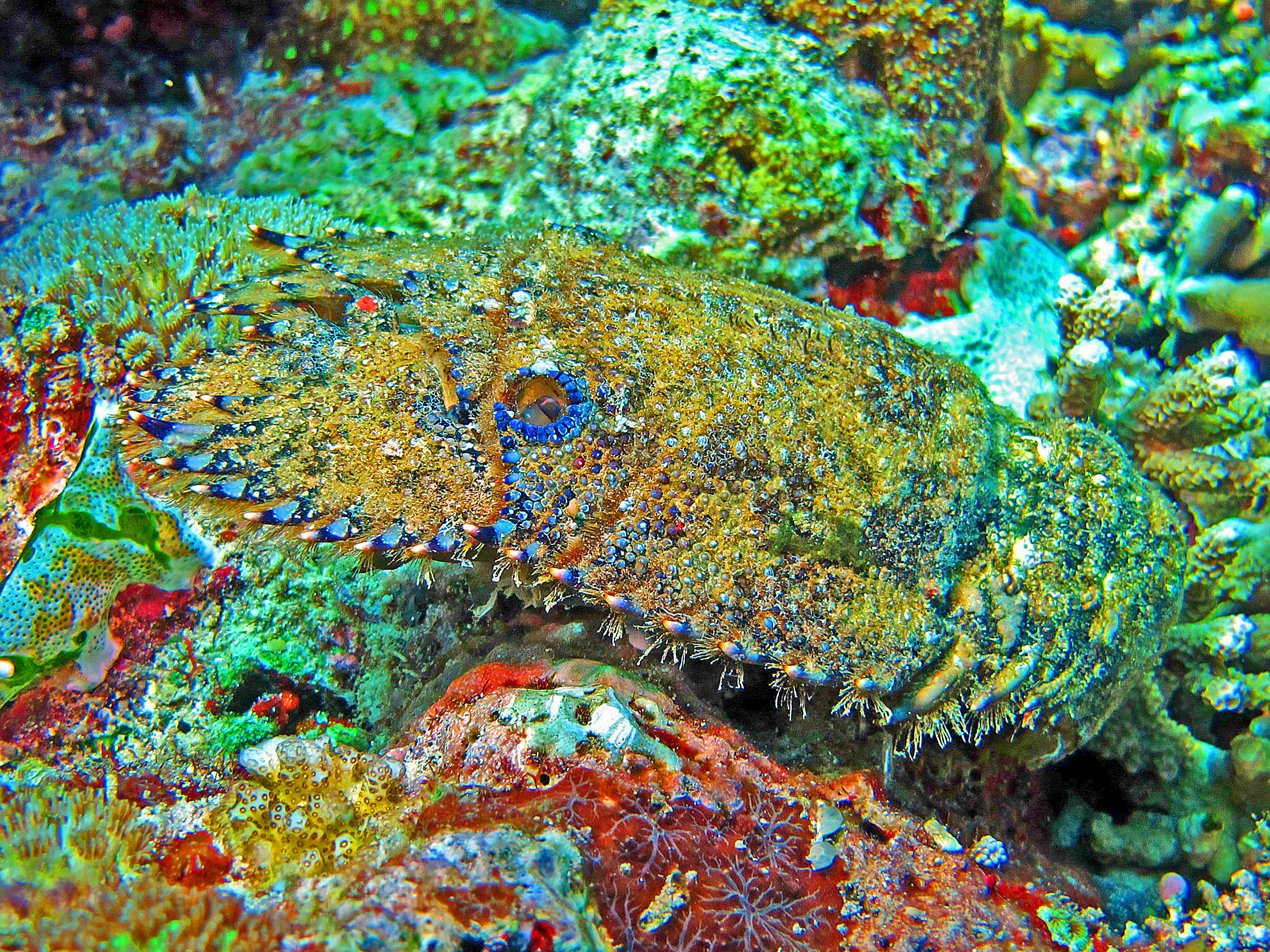
- Parribacus antarcticus, in Bunaken, Sulawesi

Conservation status
- Least Concern (IUCN 3.1)

Scientific classification
- Kingdom: Animalia
- Phylum: Arthropoda
- Clade: Pancrustacea
- Class: Malacostraca
- Order: Decapoda
- Suborder: Pleocyemata
- Family: Scyllaridae
- Genus: Parribacus
- Species: P. antarcticus

Binomial name
- Parribacus antarcticus (Lund, 1793)

Synonyms
- Cancer (Astacus) ursus major Herbst, 1793; Cancer barffi Curtiss, 1938; Ibacus antarcticus (Lund, 1793); Ibacus ciliatus Guilding, 1824; Ibacus parrae H. Milne Edwards, 1837; Parribacus antarcticus carinatus Pfeffer, 1881; Parribacus papyraceus Rathbun, 1906; Parribacus ursus major (Herbst, 1793); Pseudibacus Pfefferi Miers, 1882; Scyllarus antarcticus Lund, 1793; Scyllarus carinatus Guilding, 1824

= Parribacus antarcticus =

Species of crustacean

Parribacus antarcticus is a species of slipper lobster. Its common names include "sculptured mitten lobster" and "sculptured slipper lobster" in English, and ula-pehu and ula-pápapa in Hawaiian.

== Description ==
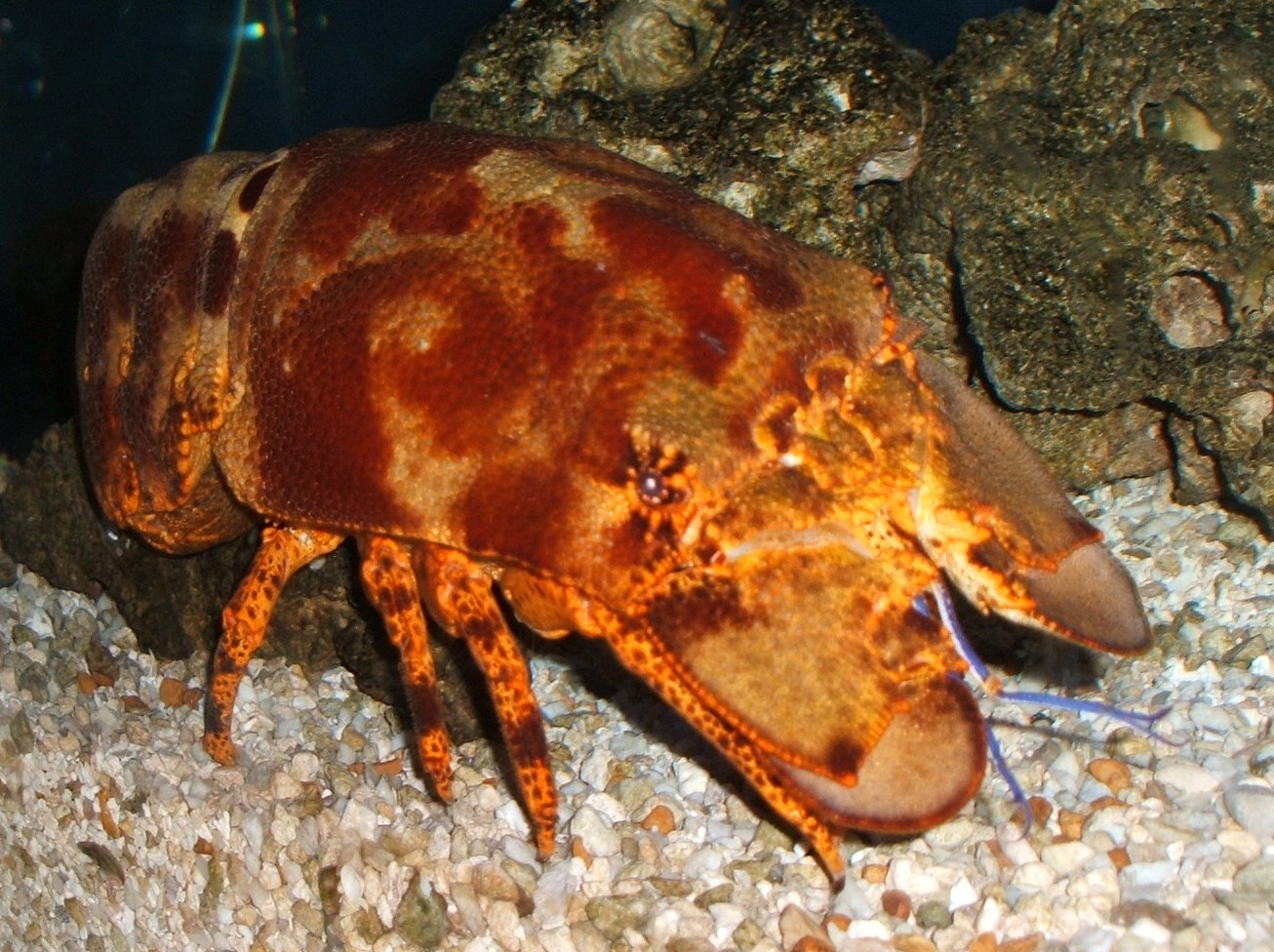
Parribacus antarcticus, at the Washington Zoo

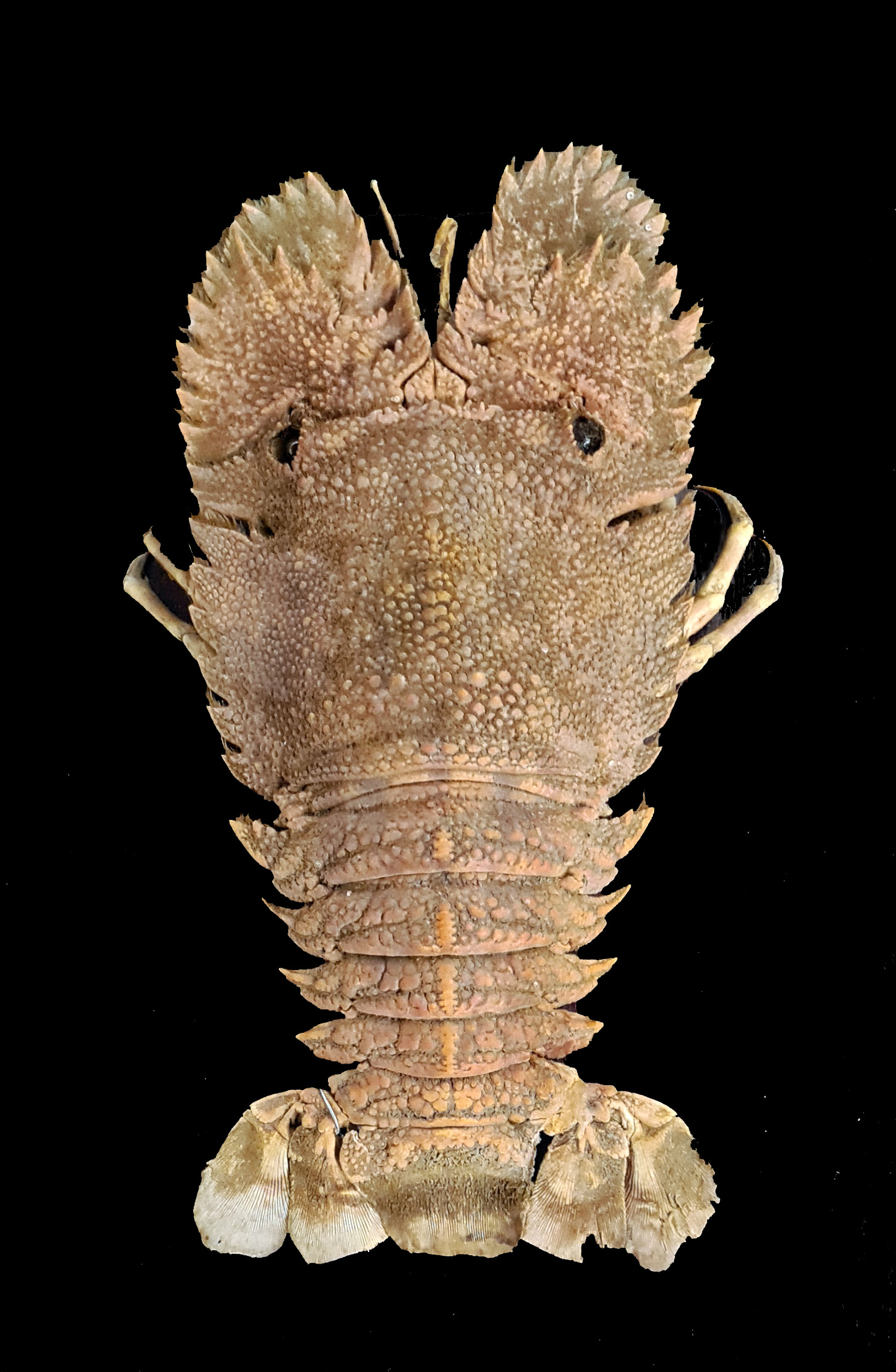
Parribacus antarcticus from the Indian Ocean at the Musée zoologique de la ville de Strasbourg

Parribacus antarcticus can reach a length of about 20 cm in males, but usually they are between 12 and 15 cm.. They are yellowish, mottled with brown and black patches, while rostrum and orbital margin are purplish. They have quite flattened bodies, with dorsal surface covered with tubercles and short hairs. The lateral margin shows large teeth banded with yellow, orange and light purple. In the abdominal somites the transverse groove is wide, with just a few hairs or tubercles. The small eyes are situated inside not closed orbits on the anterior margin of the carapace.

This species is nocturnal and in the daytime it usually hides in crevices or underside of large slabs or ledges, frequently in small groups. It can swim backwards very quickly by using the tails. This slipper lobster eats a variety of molluscs, small shrimps, crabs and sea urchins.

== Distribution ==
P. antarcticus is distributed along the western coast the Atlantic Ocean from Florida to northern Brazil, along the southern coast of Africa in the Indian Ocean, and in Hawaii and Polynesia in the South Pacific Ocean.

== Habitat ==
These slipper lobsters are bottom dwellers. Their habitat are the shallow water of lagoons and coral or stone marine reefs, preferably with a sandy bottom, at a depth of 0 – 20 m.
