= Charles Fransen =

Dutch zoologist

Charles Fransen is a zoologist from the Netherlands, specializing in shrimps.

He is currently a permanent researcher and curator of Crustacea (specializes in shrimps) at Naturalis Biodiversity Center, as well as an examiner of the Biology Education at Leiden University, both in the Netherlands.

He is also the author of several marine decapod species. He also has compiled three sets of databases for shrimp and crab species on the coast of West Africa.

His zoological author abbreviation is Fransen.

== See also ==
- Taxa named by Charles Fransen.
