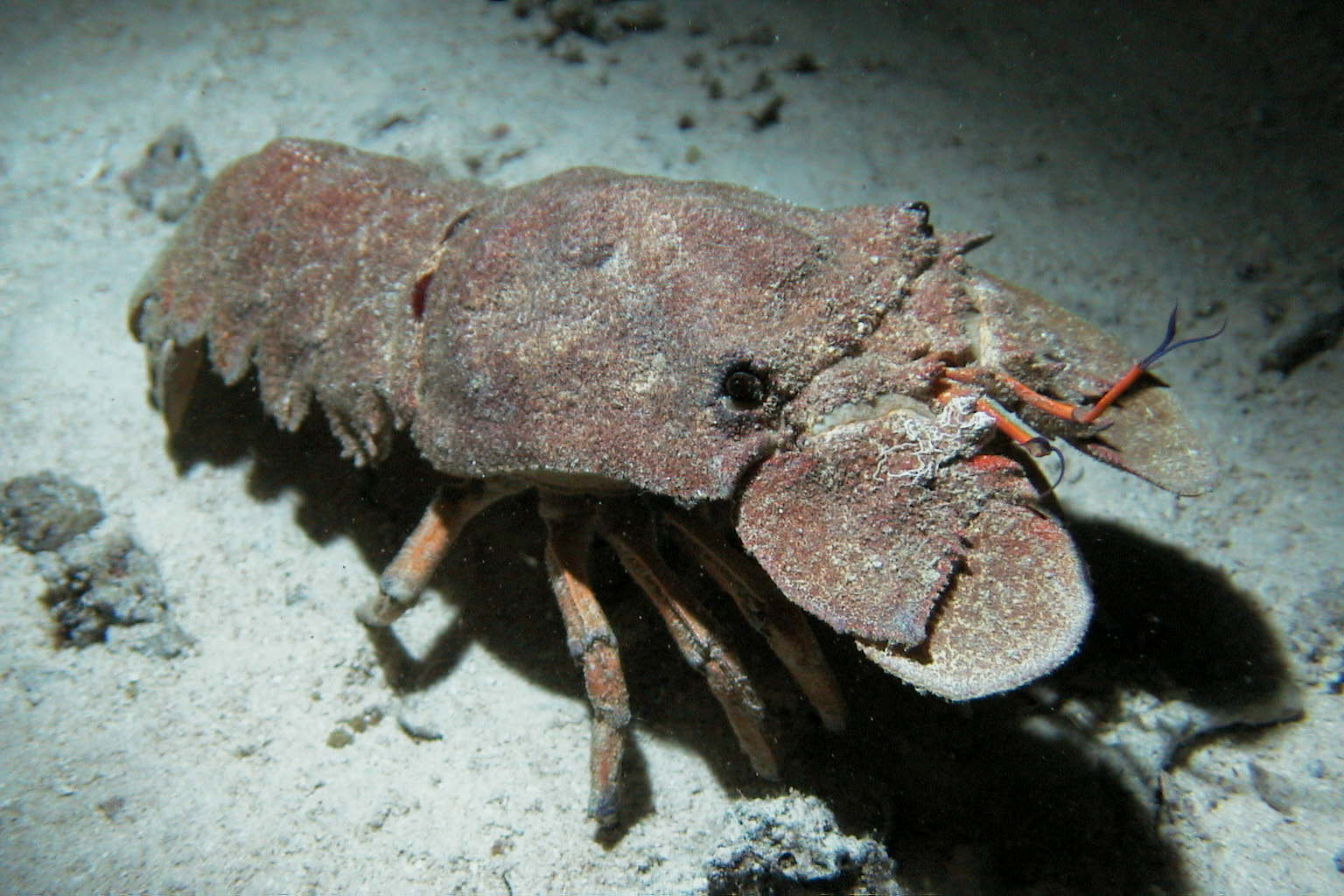
- Scyllarides latus

Scientific classification
- Kingdom: Animalia
- Phylum: Arthropoda
- Clade: Pancrustacea
- Class: Malacostraca
- Order: Decapoda
- Suborder: Pleocyemata
- Infraorder: Achelata
- Family: Scyllaridae; Latreille, 1825

Subfamilies
- Arctidinae; Ibacinae; Scyllarinae; Theninae

= Slipper lobster =

Slipper lobsters Temporal range: 100–0 Ma

Family of crustaceans

Slipper lobsters are a family (Scyllaridae) of about 90 species of achelate crustaceans, in the Decapoda clade Reptantia, found in all warm oceans and seas. They are not true lobsters, but are more closely related to spiny lobsters and furry lobsters. Slipper lobsters are instantly recognisable by their enlarged antennae, which project forward from the head as wide plates. All the species of slipper lobsters are edible, and some, such as the Moreton Bay bug and the Balmain bug (Ibacus peronii), are of commercial importance.

== Description ==
Slipper lobsters have six segments in their heads and eight segments in the thorax, which are collectively covered in a thick carapace. The six segments of the abdomen each bear a pair of pleopods, while the thoracic appendages are either walking legs or maxillipeds. The head segments bear various mouthparts and two pairs of antennae. The first antennae, or antennules, are held on a long flexible stalk, and are used for sensing the environment. The second antennae are the slipper lobsters' most conspicuous feature, as they are expanded and flattened into large plates that extend horizontally forward from the animal's head.

There is considerable variation in size among species of slipper lobsters. The Mediterranean species Scyllarus pygmaeus is the smallest, growing to a maximum total length of 55 millimetres (2.2 in), and rarely more than 40 mm (1.6 in). The largest species, Scyllarides haanii, may reach 50 centimetres (20 in) long.

== Ecology ==
Slipper lobsters are typically bottom dwellers of the continental shelves, found at depths of up to 500 metres (1,600 ft). Slipper lobsters eat a variety of molluscs, including limpets, mussels and oysters, as well as crustaceans, polychaetes and echinoderms. They grow slowly and live to a considerable age. They lack the giant neurones which allow other decapod crustaceans to perform tailflips, and must rely on other means to escape predator attack, such as burial in a substrate and reliance on the heavily armoured exoskeleton.

The most significant predators of slipper lobsters are bony fish, with the grey triggerfish being the most significant predator of Scyllarides latus in the Mediterranean Sea.

== Life cycle ==
A pair of slipper lobster (Scyllaridae) larvae

After hatching out of their eggs, young slipper lobsters pass through around ten instars as phyllosoma larvae — leaf-like, planktonic zoeae. These ten or so stages last the greater part of a year, after which the larva moults into a "nisto" stage that lasts a few weeks. Almost nothing is known about the transition from this stage to the adults, which continue to grow through a series of moults.

== Commercial importance ==
Global production of slipper lobsters from 1957 to 2007

Although they are fished for wherever they are found, slipper lobsters have not been the subject of such intense fishery as spiny lobsters or true lobsters. The methods used for catching slipper lobsters vary depending on the species' ecology. Those that prefer soft substrates, such as Thenus and Ibacus, are often caught by trawling, while those that prefer crevices, caves and reefs (including Scyllarides, Arctides and Parribacus species) are usually caught by scuba divers.

The global catch of slipper lobsters was reported in 1991 to be 2,100 tonnes (2,100 long tons; 2,300 short tons). More recently, annual production has been around 5,000 tonnes (4,900 long tons; 5,500 short tons), the majority of which is production of Thenus orientalis in Asia.

== Common names ==
A number of common names have been applied to the family Scyllaridae. The most common of these is "slipper lobster", followed by "shovel-nosed lobster" and "locust lobster". "Spanish lobster" is used for members of the genus Arctides, "mitten lobster" for Parribacus, and "fan lobster" for Evibacus and Ibacus. In Australia, a number of species are called "bugs", for example, the Balmain bug (Ibacus peronii) and the Moreton Bay bug (Thenus orientalis). Other names used in Australia include "bay lobster", "blind lobster", "flapjack", "flat lobster", "flying saucer", "gulf lobster", "mudbug", "sandbug", "shovel-nose bug", "shovelnose lobster", "crayfish", "slipper bug" and "squagga". Rarer terms include "flathead lobster" (for Thenus orientalis) and "bulldozer lobster". In Greece they may be known as Kolochtypes which roughly translates as 'bum hitter'. Twenty-two genera are recognised, the majority of which were erected in 2002 by Lipke Holthuis for species formerly classified under Scyllarus:

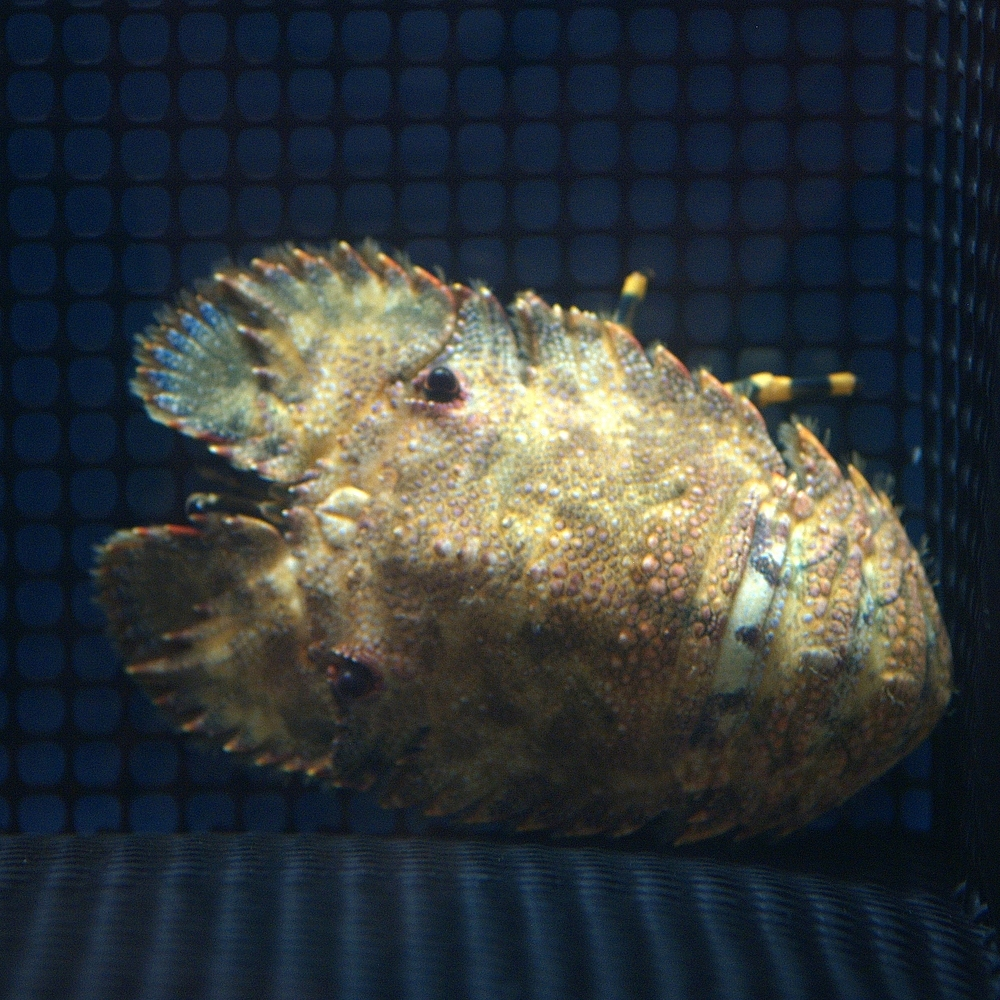
Parribacus japonicus

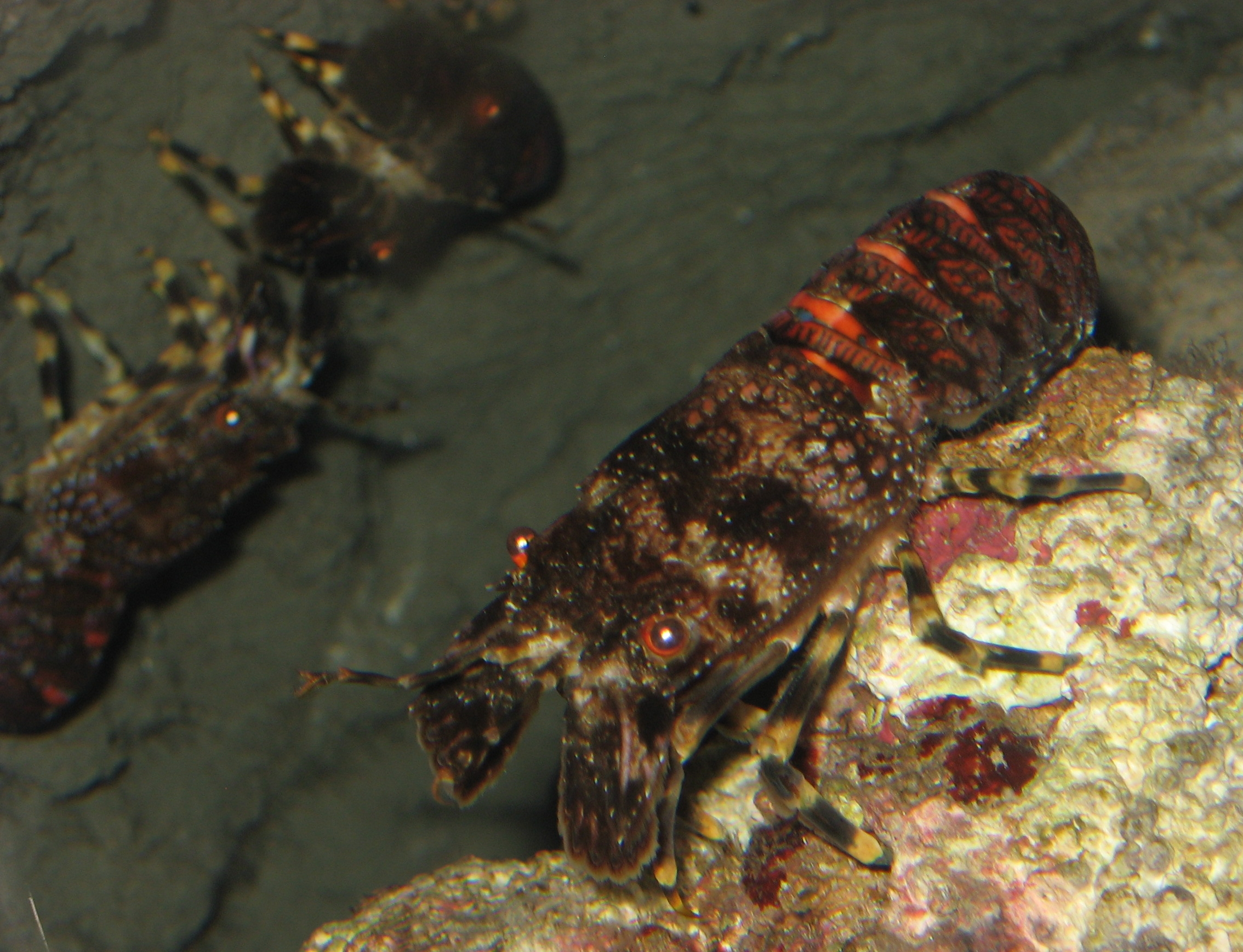
Scyllarus arctus

== Genera ==
Slipper lobsters belong to the following genera.

Scyllarinae Latreille, 1825

- Acantharctus Holthuis, 2002
- Antarctus Holthuis, 2002
- Antipodarctus Holthuis, 2002
- Bathyarctus Holthuis, 2002
- Biarctus Holthuis, 2002
- Chelarctus Holthuis, 2002
- Crenarctus Holthuis, 2002
- Eduarctus Holthuis, 2002
- Galearctus Holthuis, 2002
- Gibbularctus Holthuis, 2002
- Petrarctus Holthuis, 2002
- Remiarctus Holthuis, 2002
- Scammarctus Holthuis, 2002
- Scyllarella Rathbun, 1935 (extinct)
- Scyllarus Fabricius, 1775

Arctidinae Holthuis, 1985

- Arctides Holthuis, 1960
- Scyllarides Gill, 1898

Ibacinae Holthuis, 1985

- Evibacus S. I. Smith, 1869
- Ibacus Leach, 1815
- Palibacus Förster, 1984 (extinct)
- Parribacus Dana, 1852

Theninae Holthuis, 1985

- Thenus Leach, 1815

== Gallery ==
Gallery of various slipper lobsters species:

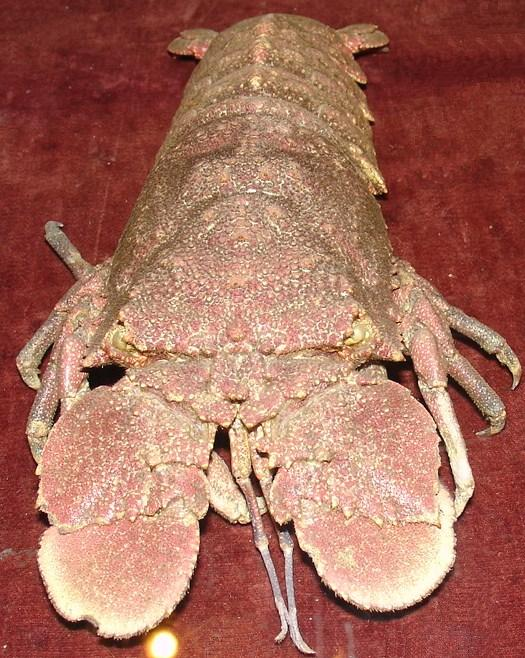
Arctides antipodum

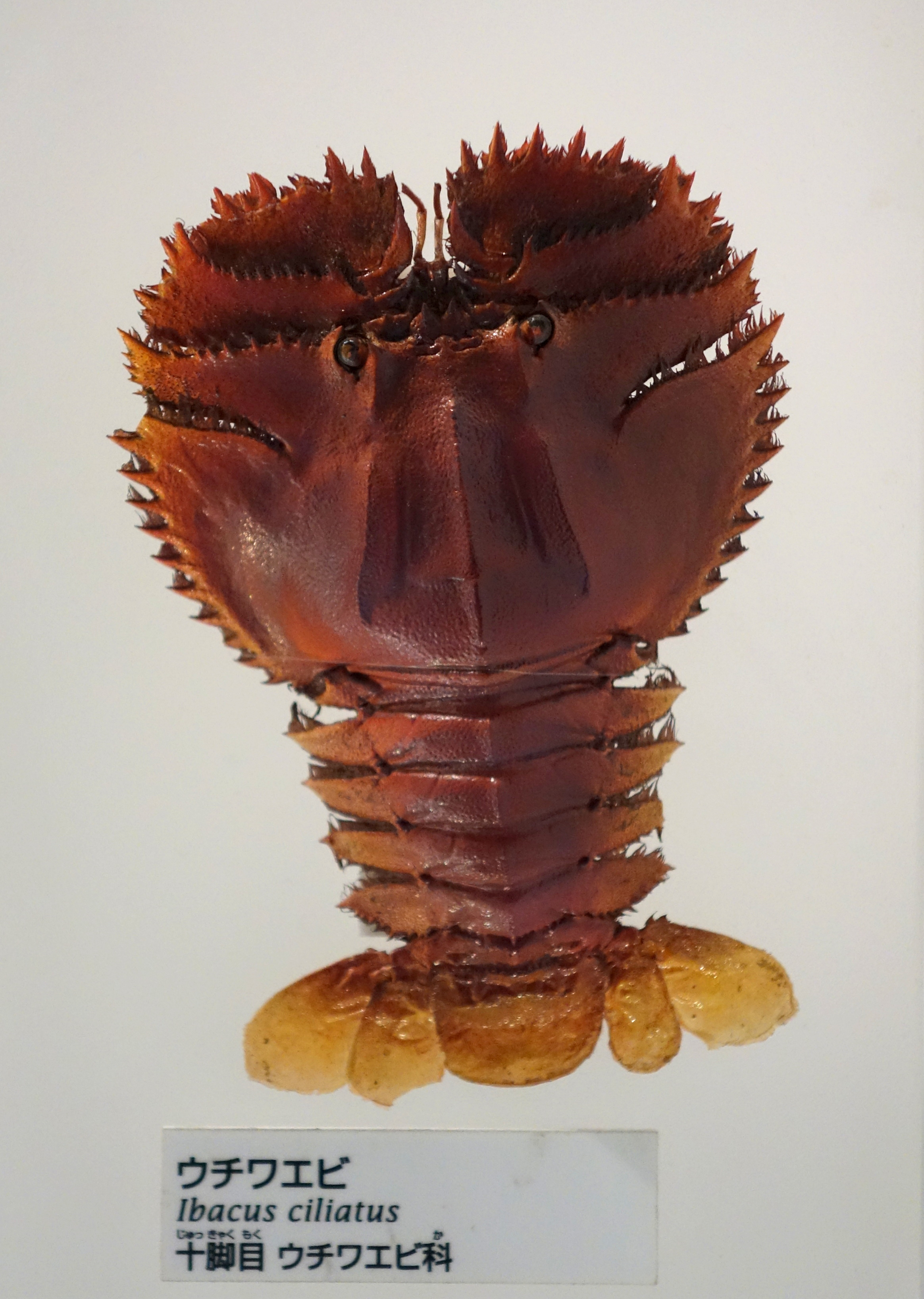
Ibacus ciliatus

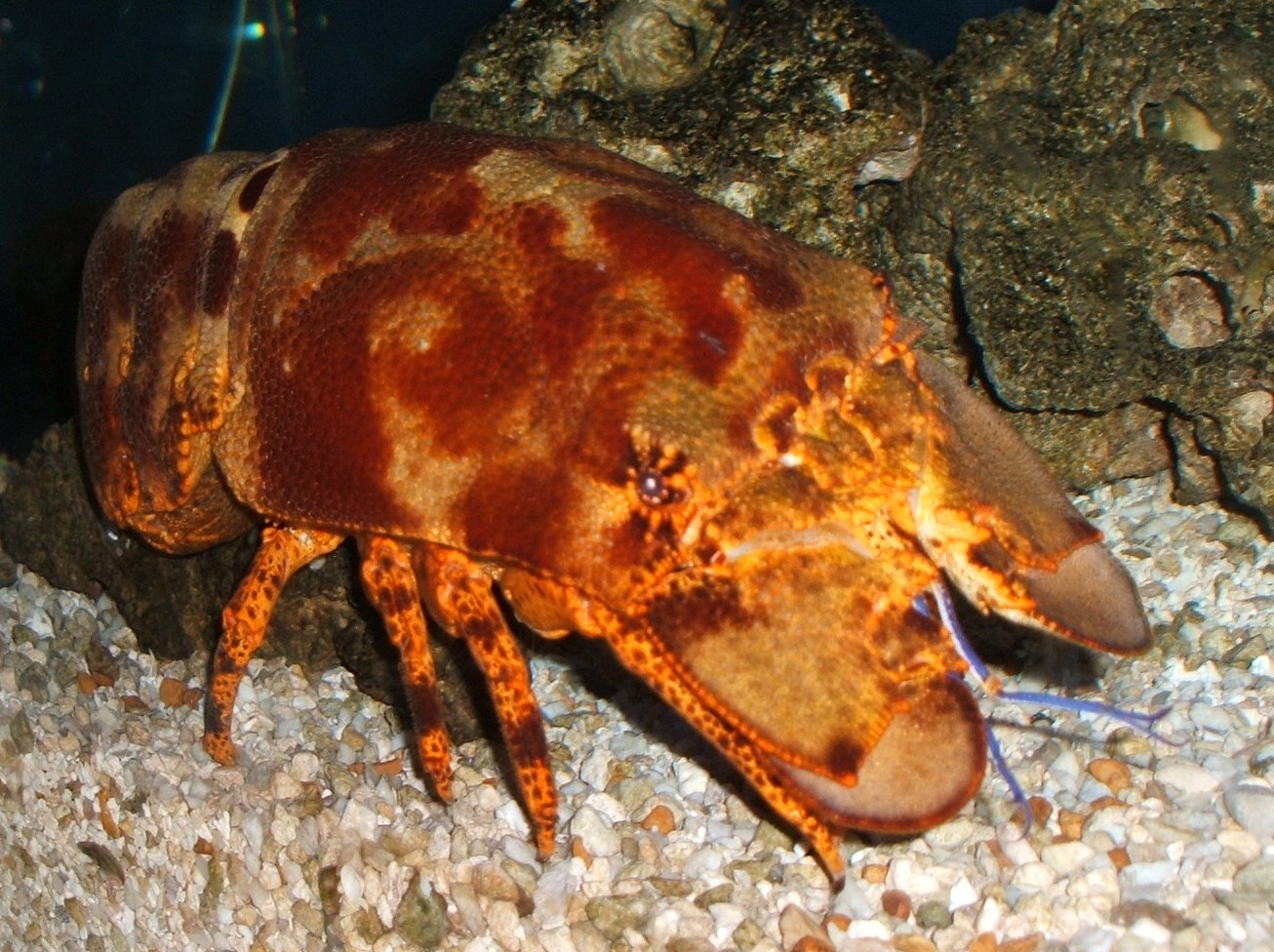
Parribacus antarcticus

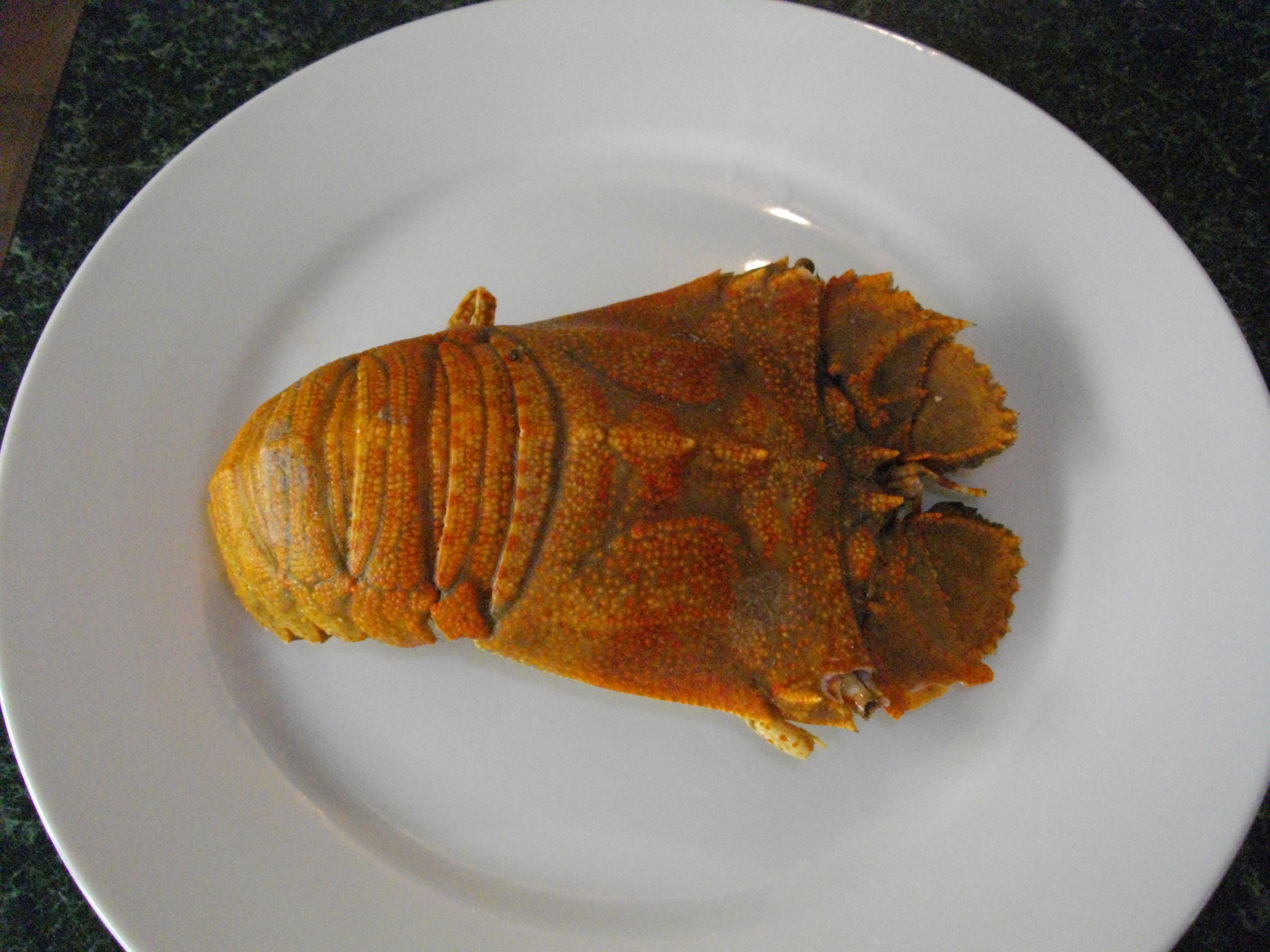
Thenus orientalis (cooked)

== Fossil record ==
The fossil record of slipper lobsters extends back 100–120 million years, which is considerably less than that of slipper lobsters' closest relatives, the spiny lobsters. One significant earlier fossil is Cancrinos claviger, which was described from Upper Jurassic sediments at least 142 million years ago, and may represent either an ancestor of modern slipper lobsters, or the sister group to the family Scyllaridae sensu stricto.
