= Lipke Holthuis =

Dutch carcinologist

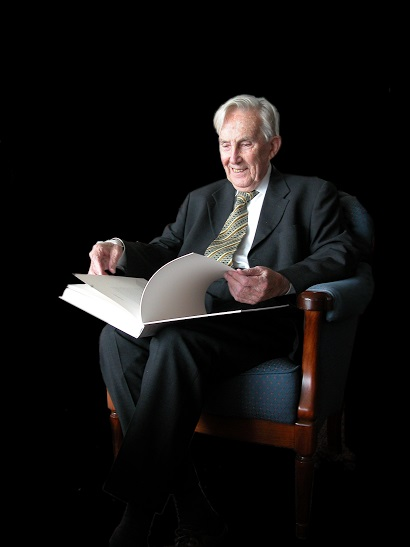
- Holthuis (2006)
- Born: 21 April 1921; Probolinggo
- Died: 7 March 2008 (aged 86); Leiden
- Education: Leiden University
- Scientific career
- Fields: Carcinology
- Workplaces: Rijksmuseum van Natuurlijke Historie

Lipke Bijdeley Holthuis (21 April 1921 – 7 March 2008) was a Dutch carcinologist, considered one of the "undisputed greats" of carcinology, and "the greatest carcinologist of our time".

Holthuis was born in Probolinggo, East Java and obtained his doctorate from Leiden University on 23 January 1946. He was appointed the assistant curator of the Rijksmuseum van Natuurlijke Historie (now Naturalis) in Leiden in 1941. He was the most prolific carcinologist of the 20th century, publishing 620 papers (108 of which were in the Leiden Museum Journals) totalling 12,795 pages which is an average of 185 pages per year and an average of approximately 21 pages per paper. These were published on many groups of crustaceans, their natural history and nomenclature, and the history of carcinology. This steady stream of publications resulted in the description of 428 new taxa: 2 new families, 5 subfamilies, 83 genera and 338 species. 67 taxa were named after him between 1953 (Hippolyte holthuisi) and 2009 (Caridina holthuisi, Lysmata holthuisi). However, in Fransen, C.H.J.M., De Grave, S., Ng, P.K.L. 2010, an additional 50 taxa were named after him.

In 1972 Holthuis received an honorary doctorate from the Norwegian University of Science and Technology (NTNU).

== Publication on Holthuis ==
- (in Dutch) Alex Alsemgeest & Charles Fransen [et al.]: In krabbengang door kreeftenboeken. De Bibliotheca Carcinologica L.B. Holthuis. Leiden, Naturalis Biodiversity Center, 2016. ISBN 978-90-6519-013-0

== See also ==
- Category:Taxa named by Lipke Holthuis
