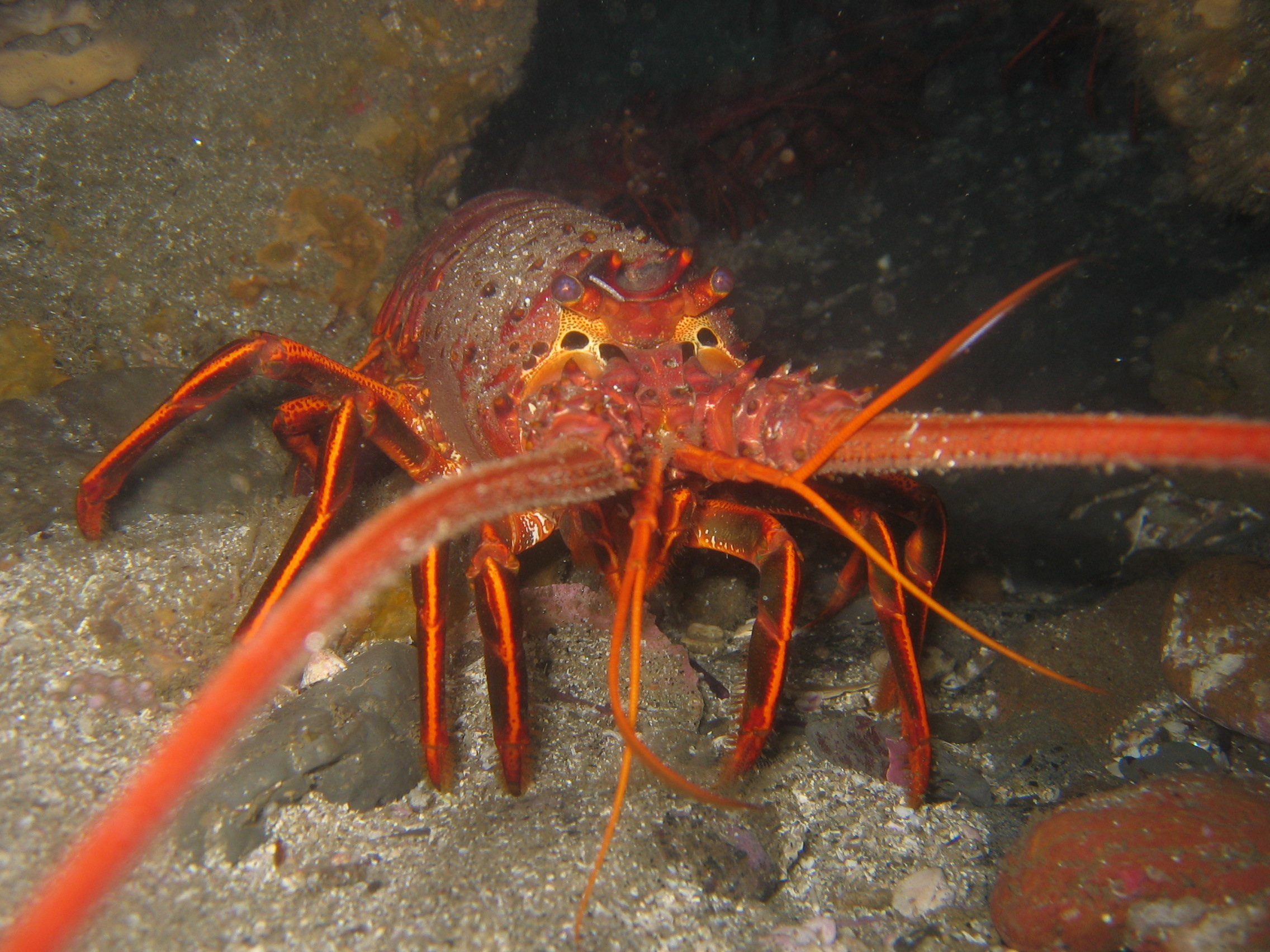

Conservation status
- Least Concern (IUCN 3.1)

Scientific classification
- Kingdom: Animalia
- Phylum: Arthropoda
- Clade: Pancrustacea
- Class: Malacostraca
- Order: Decapoda
- Suborder: Pleocyemata
- Family: Palinuridae
- Genus: Panulirus
- Species: P. interruptus

Binomial name
- Panulirus interruptus (J. W. Randall, 1840)
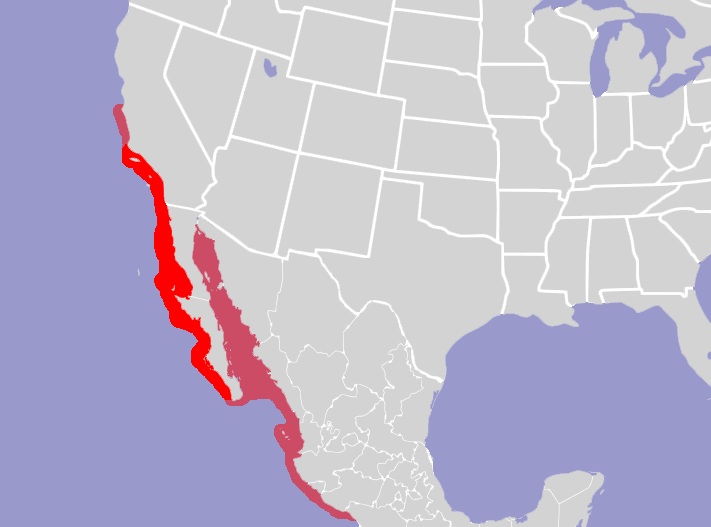
- Range of Panulirus interruptus: main areas in red; peripheral areas in darker red

Synonyms
- Palinurus interruptus J. W. Randall, 1840

= California spiny lobster =

Species of crustacean

The California spiny lobster (Panulirus interruptus) is a species of spiny lobster found in the eastern Pacific Ocean from Monterey Bay, California, to the Gulf of Tehuantepec, Mexico. It typically grows to a length of 30 cm (12 in) and is a reddish-brown color with stripes along its legs, and has a pair of enlarged antennae but no claws. The interrupted grooves across the tail are characteristic for the species.

Females can carry up to 680,000 eggs, which hatch after 10 weeks into flat phyllosoma larvae. These larvae feed on plankton before their metamorphosis into the juvenile state. Adults are nocturnal and migratory, living among rocks at depths of up to 65 m (213 ft), and feeding on sea urchins, clams, mussels and worms. The spiny lobster is eaten by various fish, octopuses and sea otters, but can defend itself with a loud noise produced by its antennae. The California spiny lobster is the subject of both commercial and recreational fishery in both Mexico and the United States, with sport fishermen using hoop nets and commercial fishermen using lobster traps. It is also considered a keystone species because of their control of urchin species which would otherwise damage kelp forests.

== Morphology ==
=== Appearance ===
In common with all spiny lobsters, the California spiny lobster has two large, spiny antennae, but no large claws on its legs. The California spiny lobster is one of the largest spiny lobster species, and grows up to 60 centimeters (24 in) long, but does not usually exceed 30 cm (12 in). Males can weigh up to 7.4 kilograms (16 lb)., with the record being a 16 lbs., 1 oz. male caught off Catalina island in 1968. The upper side of the animal is brownish red, without the paler bands or spots seen in some other spiny lobsters. The legs are a similar color, but with one or more lighter streaks running along their length. California spiny lobsters in particular have very brightly colored eye-spots.

=== Sexual differences ===
Males and females of all ages can be distinguished by the position of the two round genital openings or gonopores. In females, they are at the bases of the third pair of pereiopods, while in males they are at the base of the fifth (last) pereiopods, furthest from the head and the closest to the abdomen. Mature females have a small claw on the fifth pereiopod, and enlarged pleopods.

== Distribution ==
The California spiny lobster is found in parts of the Gulf of California, and along the Pacific coast of the length of the Baja California peninsula, extending as far north as San Luis Obispo Bay, California. There are occasional records from Monterey Bay, but the water there is too cold for the California spiny lobster to breed, and it is thought that any adult found in Central California arrived as a larva during El Niño years.

California spiny lobsters live on rocky substrates, at depths of up to 65 meters (213 ft). Although adults can be found in shallow water, including tide pools, they are more frequent in deeper waters. Juveniles generally inhabit rocky habitats at a depth of 0–4 m (0–13 ft) with dense plant cover, especially the surf grass Phyllospadix torreyi.

== Ecology and behavior ==
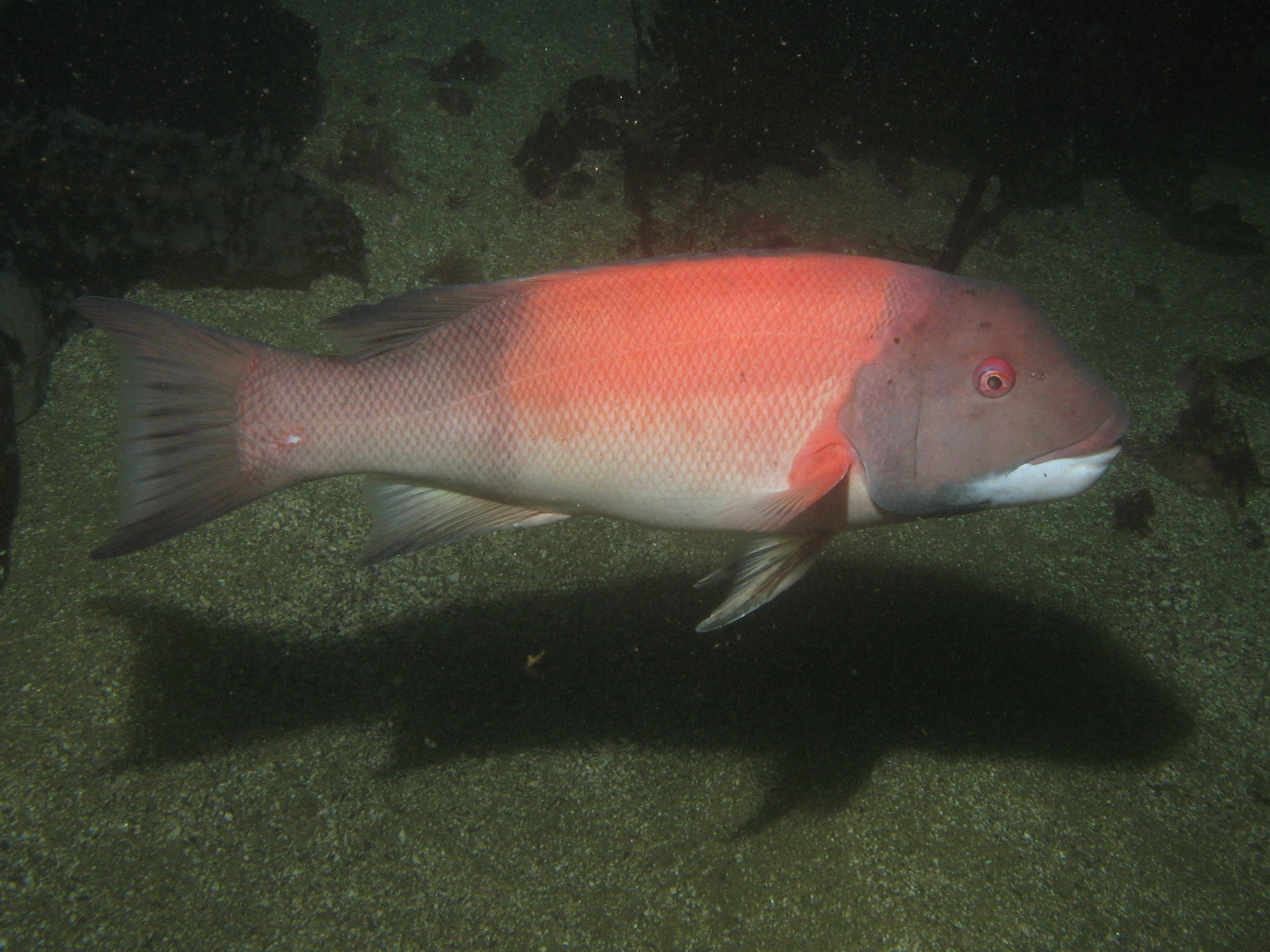
The California sheephead is a major predator of the California spiny lobster.

=== Feeding behavior ===
California spiny lobsters are nocturnal, hiding in crevices during the day, with only the tips of their long antennae showing as a means of avoiding predators. In these crevices, they can either be found alone or with 2 to 15 lobsters. The lobsters that are in the crevices tend to retreat further back into the burrow and brace their bodies against the rocky walls instead of chaotically or synchronously swimming out and away from predators. Towards dawn, the spiny lobsters form aggregations, which they maintain until dusk. At night, they emerge and feed on sea urchins, clams, mussels and worms. This activity is important in limiting sea urchin populations, and, subsequently, maintaining healthy seabed communities. Spiny lobsters show a gregarious approach to feeding because they are able to recruit other members of their species to feeding sites. They can recruit by using chemical and olfactory cues and social behavior. However, this is not always a positive trait as fishermen can take advantage of this and use other lobsters to attract more to their traps.

=== Predators ===
Natural predators of the California spiny lobster include bony fish such as the California sheephead, giant sea bass and cabezone, sharks such as the horn shark and leopard shark, octopuses and sea otters. In response to an approaching predator, spiny lobsters, including the California spiny lobster, can produce a loud noise using the stick-slip phenomenon, akin to a bowed instrument. The bases of the antennae act as a plectrum (similar to a pick), which is rubbed over a file on the edge of the antennular plate. If a predator is very close, spiny lobsters will flex their muscular tail in order to escape the predator, backwards.

California Spiny lobsters are also able to detect predators using chemical cues. The ability for these lobsters to chemically detect conspecifics and guide lobsters to suitable shelters is called the guide effect. They have a small home range which is strongly influenced by habitat. It is estimated that their home range is maximum 0.57 km^{2} while in many New Zealand species the spiny lobsters would travel a linear distance between 3.1-5km. California spiny lobster exhibit homing behavior which is common in many other species. This homing behavior allows the lobsters to be able to locate prey, avoid predators, and return to their shelters. Also, females have been proven to travel farther distances compared to the males and this usually increases when they are brooding and when the larvae is about to be released. California spiny lobsters lack fine-tuned locomotor control while swimming meaning that they exhibit short bursts of speed to try to escape a predator but are unable to control their movements while swimming fast, prioritizing speed over accuracy. They rely heavily on walking and crawling instead of swimming fast. Another defense mechanism that these lobsters utilize is when a group of them gather in a circle and create a spiny pincushion which repels the predator instead of the group attacking the predator. They orientate their bodies in such a way that points their spiny backs towards the predators so they are too dangerous to attack. This defense mechanism is used due to the aforementioned lack of ability of the lobsters to swim away effectively. Their most well-known defense mechanism is the rasping sound that they make when attacked by a predator. The spiny lobster uses this rasp as a startle or aposematic signal. This rasp can also be coupled with the flashing of their spines to deter predators from attacking them and to let them go free.

There is an annual migration, in which spiny lobsters enter shallower water in spring and summer, and head out to deeper water in fall and winter, reaching depths as great as 240 ft (73 m), perhaps to avoid the effects of winter storms.

The California Spiny Lobster plays a key role in structuring communities in kelp forests. However, the increase in fishing has decreased both the population size and the body size of the lobster. This has changed the trends in predation of the lobster because the lobster’s predators need to eat more lobster because of their smaller sizes. Also their larger body size is one of the ways that California spiny lobsters deter predators so with decreasing numbers they are less likely to deter the predators causing a decline in numbers.

== Acoustic signaling ==
California spiny lobsters use acoustic signaling as a defense mechanism because they lack large pinchers on their claws. To produce this rasp sound, they have a sound-producing apparatus at the base of their spiny antennae evolved approximately 125 million years ago.

To produce this sound the lobsters rub a soft-tissue extension at the base of each antenna over a smooth file under each eye. The sound is created using stick-slip friction between the antenna and the surface under the eye. Because they use non-rigid surfaces to produce these stick-slip sounds the lobsters can continue to generate these sounds during their molt cycle which provides acoustic defenses when their exoskeletons are softened. Even though their physical defenses are weakened during their molt cycle they can still defend themselves using acoustic defenses.

The antenna is used for both mechanical and acoustic weaponry because they can use their spiny, sharp antennae as a shield or a sword to ward off the predator and they use their antennas to make the screeching, rasping sound that startles the predator. Once physically contacted by the predator the California spiny lobster makes the rasp sound. This rasp functions both as a vibratory escape mechanism and as an acoustic startle mechanism. Not only does the rasp sound startle the predator but the vibrations that are caused from this rasp sound cause the predator to loosen its grip on the lobsters, allowing for the lobster to escape. The vibrations can also orient the predator toward the antennae, which can cause the predator to attack the antenna. If the predator attacks the antennae then the lobster can make an escape and leave their antennae behind. They can grow back their antenna after subsequent molts. The acoustic structures don’t differ between males and females.

== Life cycle ==
Two California Spiny Lobsters offshore of Anacapa Island

Female California spiny lobsters reach sexual maturity at a length of 65–69 millimeters (2.6–2.7 in), which is typically at an age of 5–9 years; males are sexually mature after 3–6 years. Because all the hard parts are lost at each molt, the life span of mature spiny lobsters is uncertain; they are thought to live for 50 years or more.

Spiny lobsters do not have the gonopods (first pleopods modified for reproduction) that occur in clawed lobsters and crabs, and females do not have a deep pocket on the sternum in which to store sperm. Instead, a spermatophore is transferred directly from one of the male's gonopores to the sternum of the female. The male gonopore is, however, adorned with a "penile process", which is straight and serrated, with a small "hairbrush". The sternum of mature females has three "windows" on the last three segments, which uniquely among Panulirus species, span both halves of the sternum. These windows are softer than the rest of the exoskeleton, and are thought to help the male locate the correct location to place the tar-like spermatophore.

After mating, the fertilized eggs are carried on the female's pleopods until they hatch, with between 120,000 and 680,000 carried by a single female. The eggs begin coral red, but darken as they develop to a deep maroon. When she is carrying the eggs, the female is said to be "berried". The eggs are ready to hatch after 10 weeks, and spawning takes place from May to August, The larvae that hatch (called phyllosoma larvae) do not resemble the adults. Instead, they are flat, transparent animals around 14 mm (0.55 in) long, but as thin as a sheet of paper. The larvae feed on plankton, and grow through ten molts into ten further larval stages, the last of which is around 30–32 mm (1.2–1.3 in) long. California spiny lobsters have complex and extended pelagic larval phases. During this phase the lobsters pass through 11 distinct developmental stages. The majority of these phases occur while the lobsters are tens to hundreds of kilometers off the shore in oceanic waters. While they are in the larvae phase offshore, the spiny lobster larvae cycle through the oceans for 6-9 months before they settle. Because they cycle through the ocean for so long it is very unlikely that co-denning lobsters are kin.

The full series of larval molts takes around 7 months, and when the last stage molts, it metamorphoses into the puerulus state, the final larval stage, still transparent. The puerulus larvae settle to the sea floor when the water is near its maximum temperature, which in Baja California is in the fall. The lobsters during the puerulus stage don’t eat. They rely on energy that was previously accumulated and stored during the larval phase. This energy mostly consists of lipids and proteins that can only last the lobster about 20-40 days but may be able to extend to 70 days if needed. Due to the fact that the spiny lobsters can’t eat during the puerulus phase they have to find a suitable place to settle. These habitats usually consist of crevices in either rocky reefs or boulders that are in less than 15 meters of water depth. To find these habitats the California Spiny Lobsters use many environmental signals such as underwater sounds, magnetic fields, water chemistry, physical cues, celestial cues, and hydrodynamic cues. The puerulus need to use these environmental cues to find suitable habitats because without being able to find suitable habitats the puerulus will run out of food and not be able to survive. Finding and establishing a suitable habitat will determine if the puerulus will be able to survive or not.

One of the environmental cues that is of great importance to the California Spiny Lobster are the underwater sounds. Underwater sounds play a key role in accelerating development and improving the conditions of the settling individuals. Individuals that are exposed to underwater sound have been shown to molt to first instar juveniles up to 38% faster than individuals that haven’t been exposed to underwater sound. Along with the delayed settlement, the individuals that weren’t exposed to underwater sound were also shown to have poorer survival and nutritional conditions compared to those that have been exposed to underwater sound. After settlement, the puerulus settles and molts into benthic juveniles. These juveniles are mostly found in crevices and holes in rocky areas. Usually where light levels are low. During this juvenile stage there are very high mortality rates in the first year after settling. The rate exceeds 80% and might be as high as 97% due to predation. The juvenile lobsters are more vulnerable to a larger size range of predators so they have a higher risk of predation compared to the larger, older lobsters. The high predation rate makes it even more important that the lobsters find good settlements early on and use the underwater sounds to find the right habitat.

The diet of the juveniles is varied, but comprises mostly amphipods and isopods, together with coralline algae and the plant Phyllospadix. When available, the juveniles prefer to eat crabs.

== Fishery ==
In his original description, John Witt Randall noted that the California spiny lobster is "used as food by the natives" of Upper California. The California spiny lobster is now the most economically important lobster on the American West Coast. Sport fishing may account for up to half the entire catch, while most of the commercial catch comes from lobster traps, with smaller amounts coming from the use of trammel nets or by trawling. The major fishing area is west of Baja California, and imports from Mexico to the United States are twice the amount produced in California.

=== Sport fishing in California ===
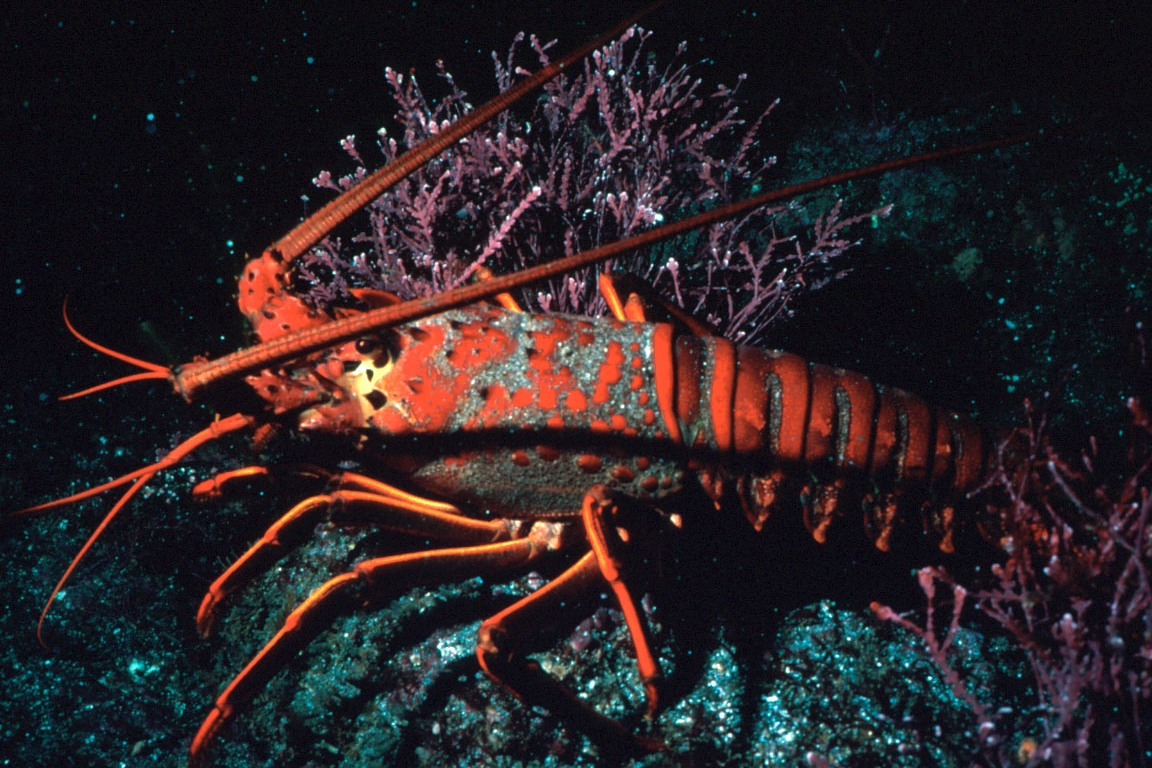
California spiny lobster

Recreational fishermen are allowed to catch lobsters with hoop nets or by SCUBA diving or free-diving; almost all come from California, with only small numbers from other U.S. states. The California Department of Fish and Game estimates that recreational fishers caught more than 200,000 spiny lobsters in the first half of the 2008/2009 season, amounting to around 280,000 pounds (130,000 kg), compared to commercial fishermen, who caught a total of 580,000 lb (260,000 kg) in the same time.

The California Department of Fish and Game sets and enforces a number of regulations pertaining to recreational fishing of spiny lobsters:

1. Open season for California spiny lobster runs from the Saturday before the first Wednesday in October until the first Wednesday after March 15.
2. No implements other than hoop nets may be used; no one person may have more than 5 nets and no vessel may use more than 10 hoop nets. When fishing from land, each fisherman is limited to two hoop nets.
3. Lobster fishers may not land more than seven California spiny lobsters on any given day, and may not have more than seven in their possession at any time.
4. Fishers must carry a lobster gauge, and any lobster smaller than the minimum landing size must be returned to the sea immediately. The minimum size is a carapace length of 3 1/4 inches (82.6 mm), measured along the midline from the rear of the eye socket between the horns, to the end of the carapace. This is equivalent to a total body length of 20 centimeters or 7.9 inches.
5. To fish for spiny lobster south of Point Arguello, a sport fishing license with ocean enhancement stamp must be displayed or kept nearby.
6. A report card for the season must be bought, filled in and returned before April 30 after the season ends.
7. Commercial and recreational traps must not be interfered with.

=== Commercial fishing in California ===
The open season for commercial fishing begins on the first Wednesday in October and runs until the first Wednesday after the 15th of March. Commercial fishermen may use individually buoyed traps, but may not dive for lobsters.

For those using lobster traps, the fishing effort is greatest at the beginning of the permitted season in California, and peters out towards the end of the season, 24 weeks later. Although the fishing effort becomes better concentrated on areas with more spiny lobsters during the season, the fishing efficiency (catch per unit effort) nonetheless decreases throughout the season.

=== Fishing in Mexico ===
In Mexico, spiny lobsters are an important commercial resource, representing the fifth most valuable fishery, worth US$18 million. Three species are exploited along the Pacific coast of the Baja California peninsula, but the catch of 744 t of the California spiny lobster makes up 95%–97% of the total, with only small quantities of Panulirus inflatus and Panulirus gracilis. The fishing rights are held by 26 local co-operatives.

The main legal restrictions on fishing for California spiny lobster in Mexico are a minimum landing size of 82.5 mm (3.25 in), the prohibition of catching berried females, and a closed season: from February 16 to September 14, fishing for spiny lobsters is prohibited in a region which moves south along Mexico's Pacific coast during the season.

Start date	End date	Northern limit	Southern limit
September 15	February 15	Mexico – United States border	An imaginary line running west from the mouth of El Tordillo
March 1	September 30	An imaginary line running west from the mouth of El Tordillo	An imaginary line running west from the mouth of Boca de la Soledad
May 16	November 15	An imaginary line running west from the mouth of Boca de la Soledad	Cabo San Lucas

The Mexican fishery for the California spiny lobster was the first Latin American fishery to be awarded the Marine Stewardship Council's sustainable fishery ecolabel, and the species is classed as Least Concern on the IUCN Red List.

== Conservation ==
As mentioned above, the California Spiny Lobster plays critical roles in commercial fishing as well as ecosystem management which is why California implemented a management plan to maintain sustainable population levels. This sets limits on the seasons of fishing, possession limit, and size limit of fishing. Reserves are also an effective conservation tool. The mortality rate of the lobsters inside of the reserves are reduced compared to outside of the reserves. The size and abundance of the lobsters also increased in reserves.

== Names ==
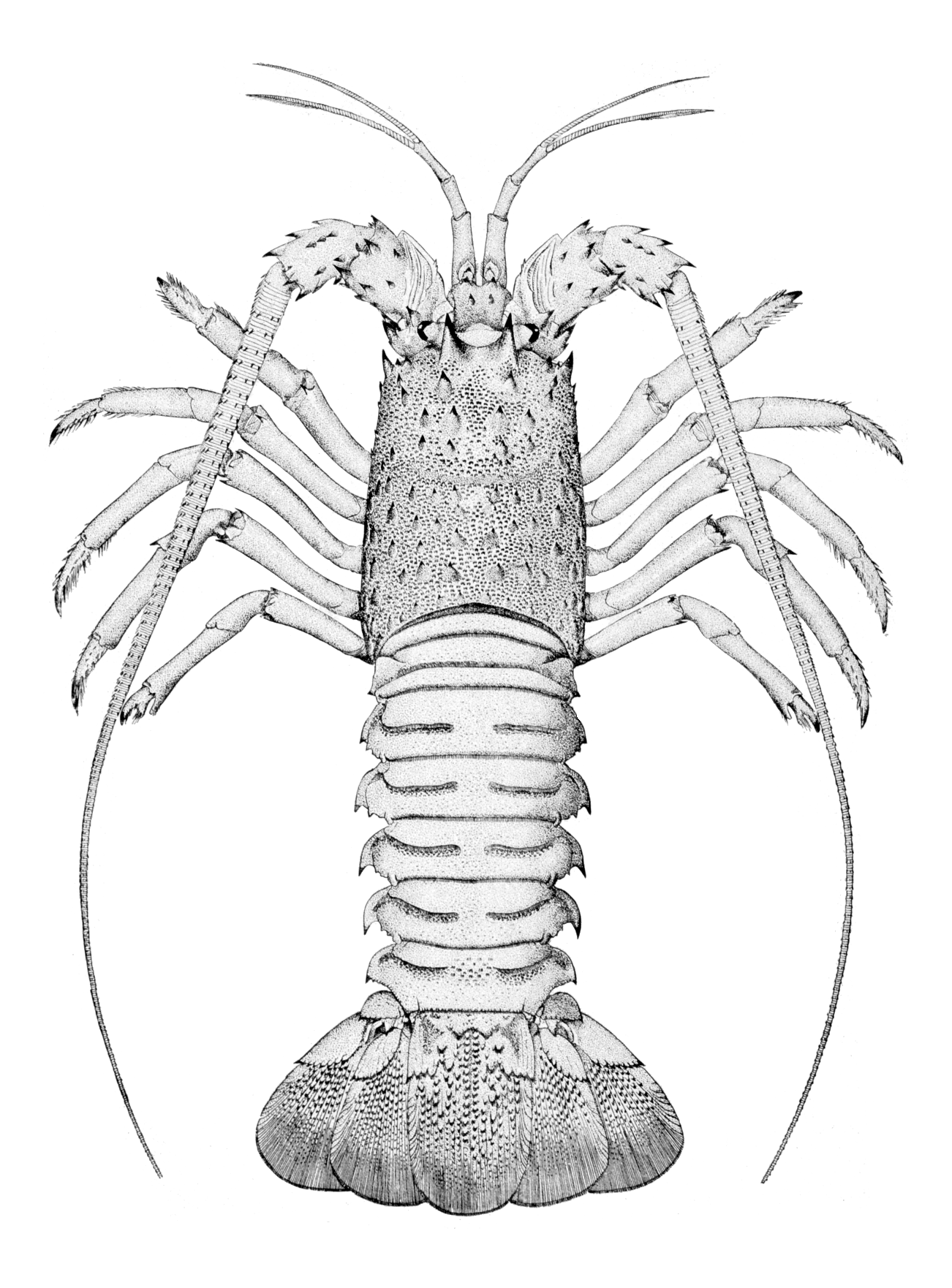
Drawing of a female Panulirus interruptus, showing the interrupted grooves across the tail which give the species its scientific name

Panulirus interruptus is called the California spiny lobster by the Food and Agriculture Organization, but a number of other local, vernacular names exist, including California lobster, California marine crayfish, and red lobster in the United States, and langosta colorada and langosta roja in Mexico. The preferred common name of the United States Fish and Wildlife Service is simply spiny lobster.

John Witt Randall described the species in the Journal of the Academy of Natural Sciences of Philadelphia in 1840, based on material given to him by Thomas Nuttall. The exact locality is not known, being given only as "Upper California", but the most likely sources are the places where Nuttall was most active, namely Santa Barbara and San Diego. The specific epithet interruptus refers to the grooves on the abdominal tergites, which are interrupted in this species. Although originally placed in the genus Palinurus, the California spiny lobster was later transferred to Adam White's new genus Panulirus, together with other spiny lobsters that have long flagella on their first antennae.

== Related species ==
The closest relatives are not the other species that occur in the East Pacific, but rather Panulirus argus from the Caribbean Sea and West Pacific species such as Panulirus japonicus, Panulirus marginatus, Panulirus pascuensis, Panulirus cygnus and Panulirus longipes; this relationship has been recovered from comparative studies of adult and larval morphology, as well as from molecular phylogenetics, using the sequences from cytochrome c oxidase and 16S ribosomal RNA genes.

The California spiny lobster can be differentiated from the other species in the genus by the interrupted grooves across the abdomen; other species either lack grooves, or have grooves which span the entire body segment.
