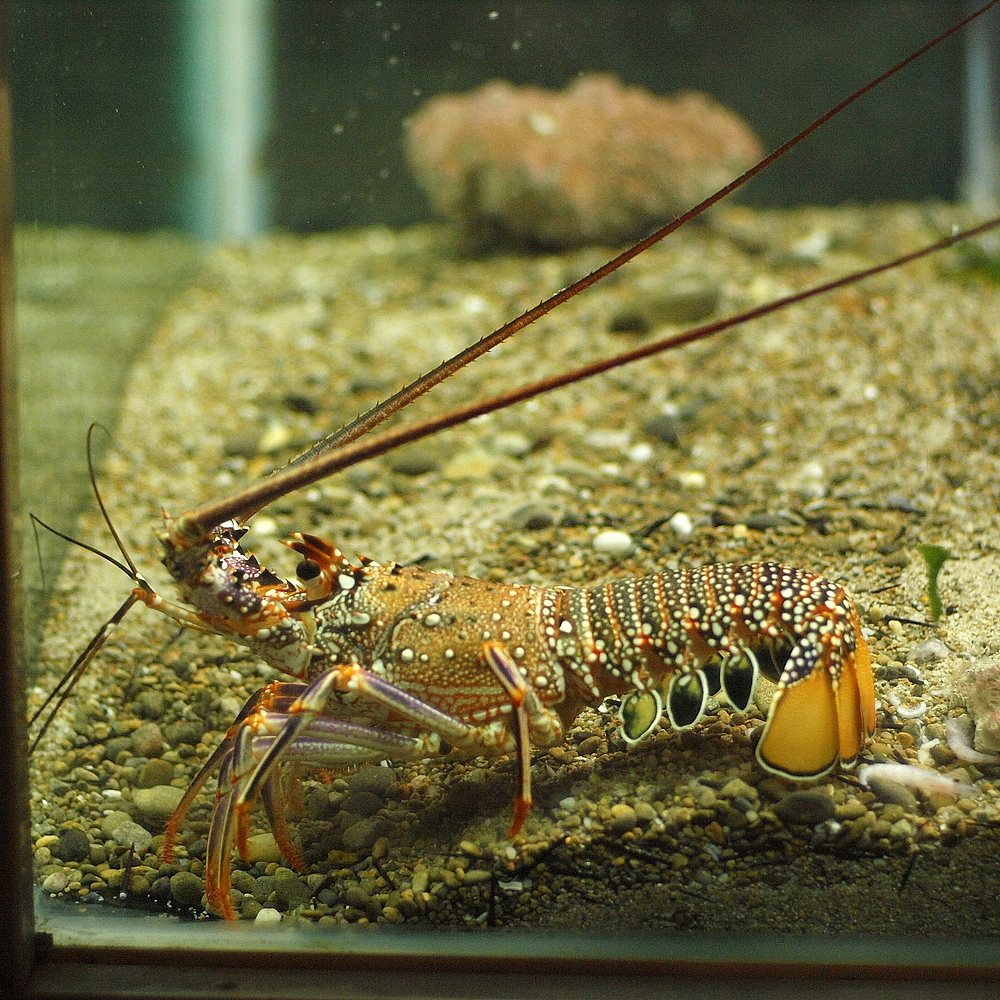

Conservation status
- Data Deficient (IUCN 3.1)

Scientific classification
- Kingdom: Animalia
- Phylum: Arthropoda
- Class: Malacostraca
- Order: Decapoda
- Suborder: Pleocyemata
- Family: Palinuridae
- Genus: Panulirus
- Species: P. brunneiflagellum

Binomial name
- Panulirus brunneiflagellum Sekiguchi & George, 2005

= Panulirus brunneiflagellum =

Species of crustacean

Panulirus brunneiflagellum in a Tokyo aquarium

Panulirus brunneiflagellum is a species of spiny lobster that lives around the Ogasawara Group (Bonin Islands) of southern Japan. Its members were previously included in P. japonicus, although it may be more closely related to P. femoristriga. It has been fished for more than 150 years by Japanese fishermen, who call the species aka-ebi. It differs from related species by the lack of banding along the flagella of the first pair of antennae.

== Distribution ==
The Ogasawara Group, or Bonin Islands, are an outlying archipelago of Japan in the western Pacific Ocean, on the Izu–Bonin–Mariana Arc. They lie around 1,000 kilometres (620 mi) south of Tokyo, and 1,500 km (930 mi) north of Saipan in the Mariana Islands. P. brunneiflagellum is the dominant Panulirus species around the southern islands in the group, but has also been recorded from Hachijo Island, at the north end of the Izu Ridge, 300 km (190 mi) from the Japanese mainland.

== Description ==
Panulirus brunneiflagellum is a typical spiny lobster. Adults vary in carapace length in the range 90–120 millimetres (3.5–4.7 in). The chief distinction between P. brunneiflagellum and related species of spiny lobster is in the colouration of the antennules (first antennae). In P. brunneiflagellum, the bases of the antennules are blackish purple, with white spots around the joints. The flagella are brownish, with no bands of colour. P. longipes bispinosus has paler antennules, and the flagella have four white bands across them.

== Taxonomy ==
In 1991, Hideo Sekiguchi reported the presence of two distinct forms of Panulirus femoristriga in Japanese waters. These were known to native fishermen as aka-ebi (literally "brown whisker") and shirahige-ebi (literally "white-banded whisker"). A third form is known as shironuke-ebi.

In 2005, Ray W. George assigned P. brunneiflagellum to an Indo-Pacific group within the genus Panulirus, which also contained P. japonicus, P. cygnus, P. marginatus and P. pascuensis. It was thought to have split from P. japonicus as a result of volcanic activity, either during the formation of the West Mariana fore-arc (20 million years ago) or during the extension of the Ogasawara Chain (20 million years ago). Subsequent molecular analyses have suggested that its sister species may instead by P. femoristriga.

== Ecology ==
Panulirus brunneiflagellum lives in clear, tropical waters at depths of up to 90 metres (300 ft), where temperatures are in the range 19–29 °C (66–84 °F). It lives in open caves, sometimes in association with P. longipes bispinosus, but usually near the entrance, whereas P. l. bispinosus shelters in the depths of the caves.

== Fishery ==
Japanese settlers colonised the Ogasawara Group in the 1860s, and began fishing P. brunneiflagellum soon after arriving. The fishery uses rectangular steel lobster traps covered in plastic mesh, roughly 1.0 × 0.5 × 0.5 metres in size. The traps are set daily at depths of 10–40 m (33–131 ft), and baited with fresh fish. Up to 24 boats are involved, 20 from Chichi-jima and up to four from Haha-jima. Between them, they catch 5 tonnes (11,000 lb) per year, of which 98% is P. brunneiflagellum (the remainder being P. longipes bispinosus and occasional P. penicillatus); Most of the catch is frozen and dispatched to Tokyo. A closed season is in force in June, July and August, to protect ovigerous (egg-bearing) females. In the absence of any detailed information, P. brunneiflagellum is listed as Data Deficient on the IUCN Red List.
