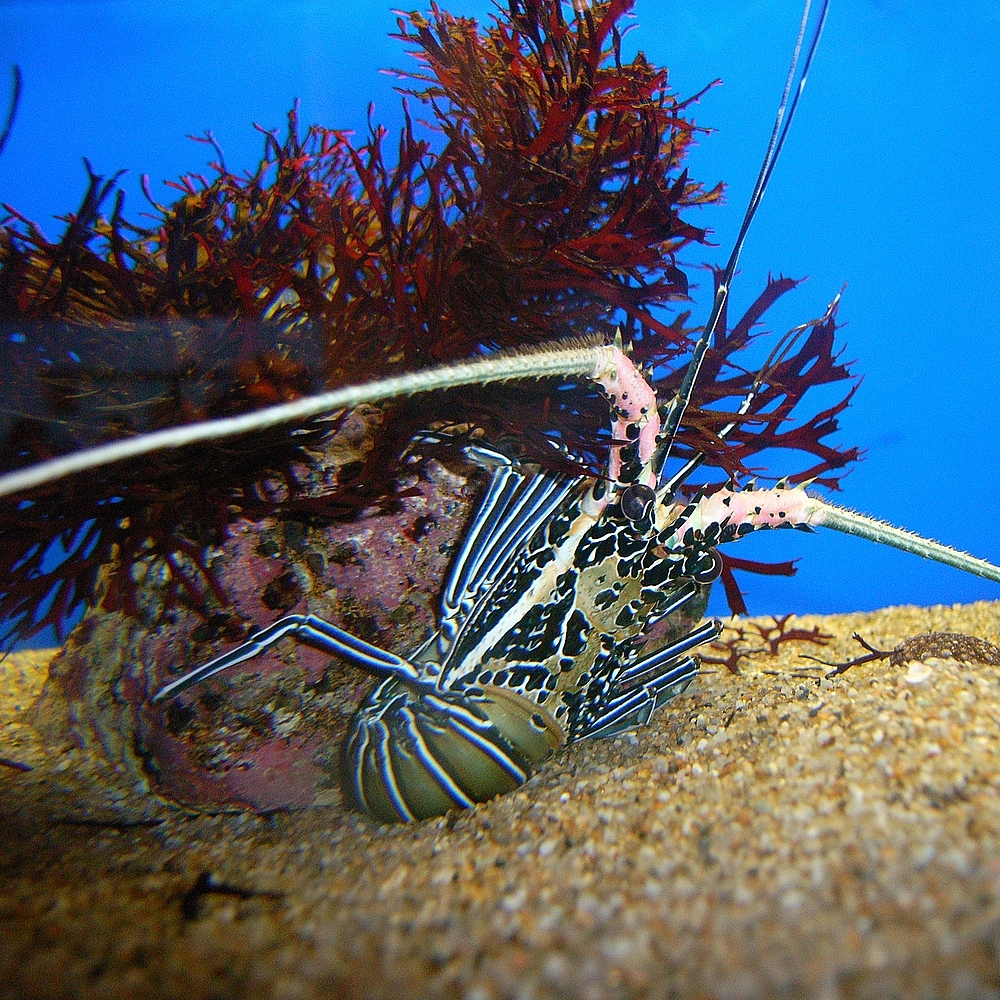

Conservation status
- Least Concern (IUCN 3.1)

Scientific classification
- Kingdom: Animalia
- Phylum: Arthropoda
- Class: Malacostraca
- Order: Decapoda
- Suborder: Pleocyemata
- Family: Palinuridae
- Genus: Panulirus
- Species: P. versicolor

Binomial name
- Panulirus versicolor (Latreille, 1804)

Synonyms
- Palinurus versicolor Latreille, 1804; Palinurus taeniatus Lamarck, 1818; Panulirus taeniatus White, 1847; Puer spinifer Ortmann, 1894; Panulirus demani Le Borradai, 1899; Puerulus spinifer Calman, 1909

= Panulirus versicolor =

Species of crustacean

Panulirus versicolor is a species of spiny lobster that lives in tropical reefs in the Indo-Pacific. Other names include painted lobster, common rock lobster, bamboo lobster, blue lobster, and blue spiny lobster. P. versicolor is one of the three most common varieties of spiny lobster in Sri Lanka, alongside Panulirus homarus and Panulirus ornatus.

== Etymology ==
The genus name Panulirus derives from the Greek word palin (meaning backwards) and oura (meaning tail and can be translated into which stands with the tail folded under the abdomen. The species name versicolor is a Latin word meaning of different colors.

== Morphology ==
Panulirus versicolor grows up to 40 centimetres (16 in) long, but is typically no more than 30 cm (12 in). It has no claws, two spiny rostra over the eyes, and two pairs of large antennae, like all spiny lobsters. The first pair of antennae are double ended, the second hard and spiny, both are usually white. The carapace is cylindrical, made of chitin, very solid and not extensible. The coloration is white, pink and black, with horizontal bands and a reticule. The abdomen is green with transverse black and white bands. The legs are dark blue to black with white stripes and the tail is blue-green. The tail is made up of five yellowish appendages yellowish at its base, with an apical blue area and a white margin. Also juveniles have a bright blue coloration with white lines, while the base of the antennas is white instead of pink. This species is rather similar to Panulirus femoristriga and Panulirus longipes.

== Biology and behaviour ==
In P. versicolor the reproduction usually takes place in summer, but it can happen all year around. Mating occurs belly to belly after a love parade. The spermatophore released by the males adheres to the female's sternum for several weeks. Females carry their eggs, about several hundred thousand, under their abdomen. A long oceanic larval phase follows, with several moults. These spiny lobster are nocturnal and solitary. In the daytime they hide in small caves and crevices in reefs or under coral. They are carnivores, eating both carrion and fresh caught arthropods, other crustaceans, and occasional small fish.

== Geographic distribution ==
Panulirus versicolor is present in the western Pacific and the Indian Ocean. In the Indian Ocean it occurs from as far south on the east coast of Africa as Natal, up through the Red Sea and Persian Gulf, in the Arabian Sea across to India, Myanmar, Thailand, and Malaysia, down through Indonesia to the waters of north-western Australia. In the western and central Pacific, it occurs as far north as southern Japan, throughout Micronesia, Melanesia, Polynesia and in the waters of north-eastern Australia.

A single P. versicolor was found in shallow coastal waters of Georgia, United States, in 2012. Likely deliberately released as an adult or unintentionally transported as a larva in a cargo ship's ballast water, it was the first specimen reported in the U.S. and the Atlantic Ocean.

== Habitat ==
This species occurs in the shallow tropical waters, in coral reef ecosystems and on seaward edges of the reef plateau, at depths up to 15 metres (49 ft).

== Economic uses ==
Panulirus versicolor is very commercially exploited, which has led to its rarefaction or even disappearance in many places; however, as its range is large and includes many protected areas, the species is not considered to be globally threatened. It is used as a food source throughout its range. P. versicolor is also kept in home aquariums.

== Gallery ==
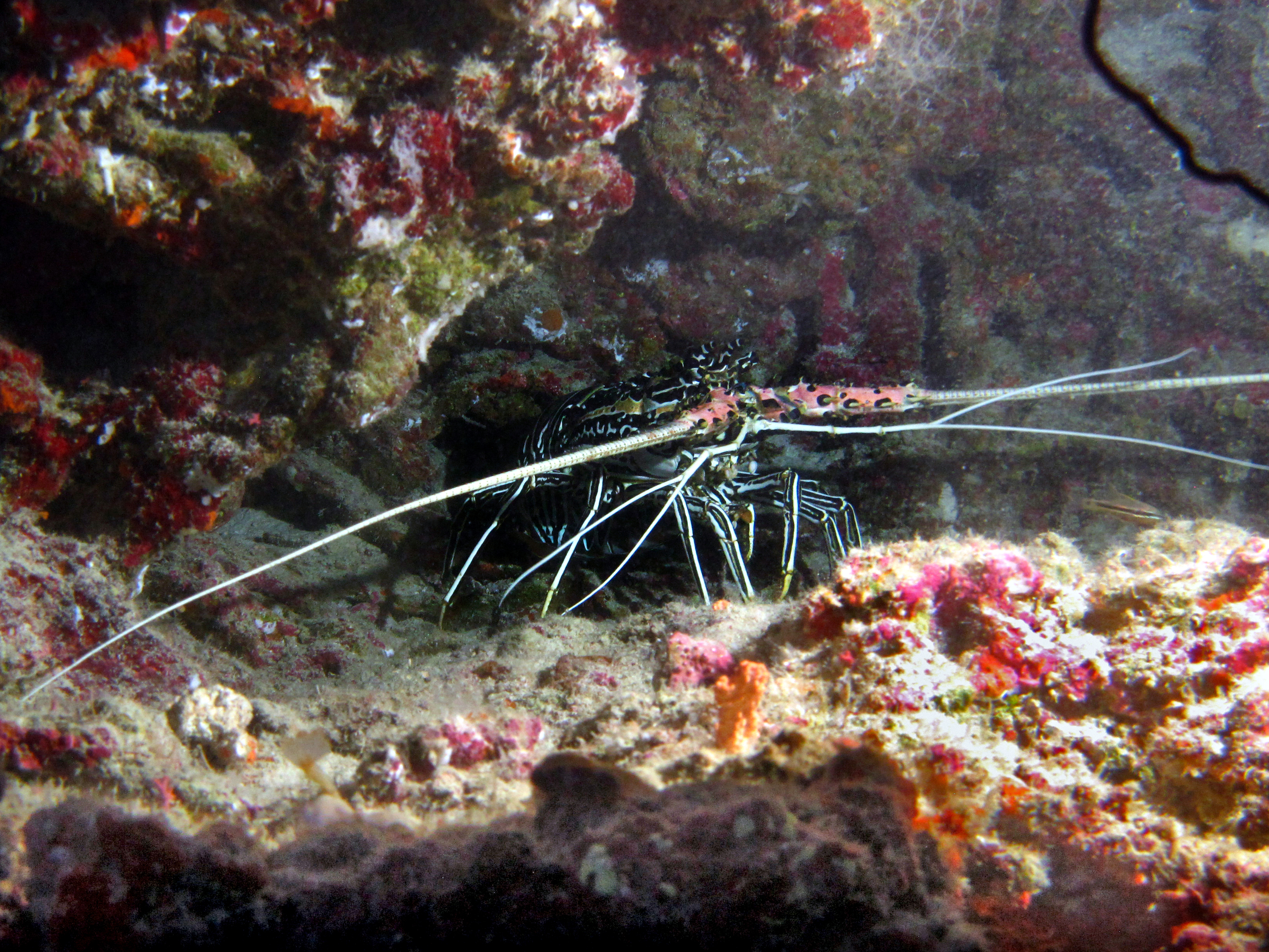
Panulirus versicolor in Maldives. Side view

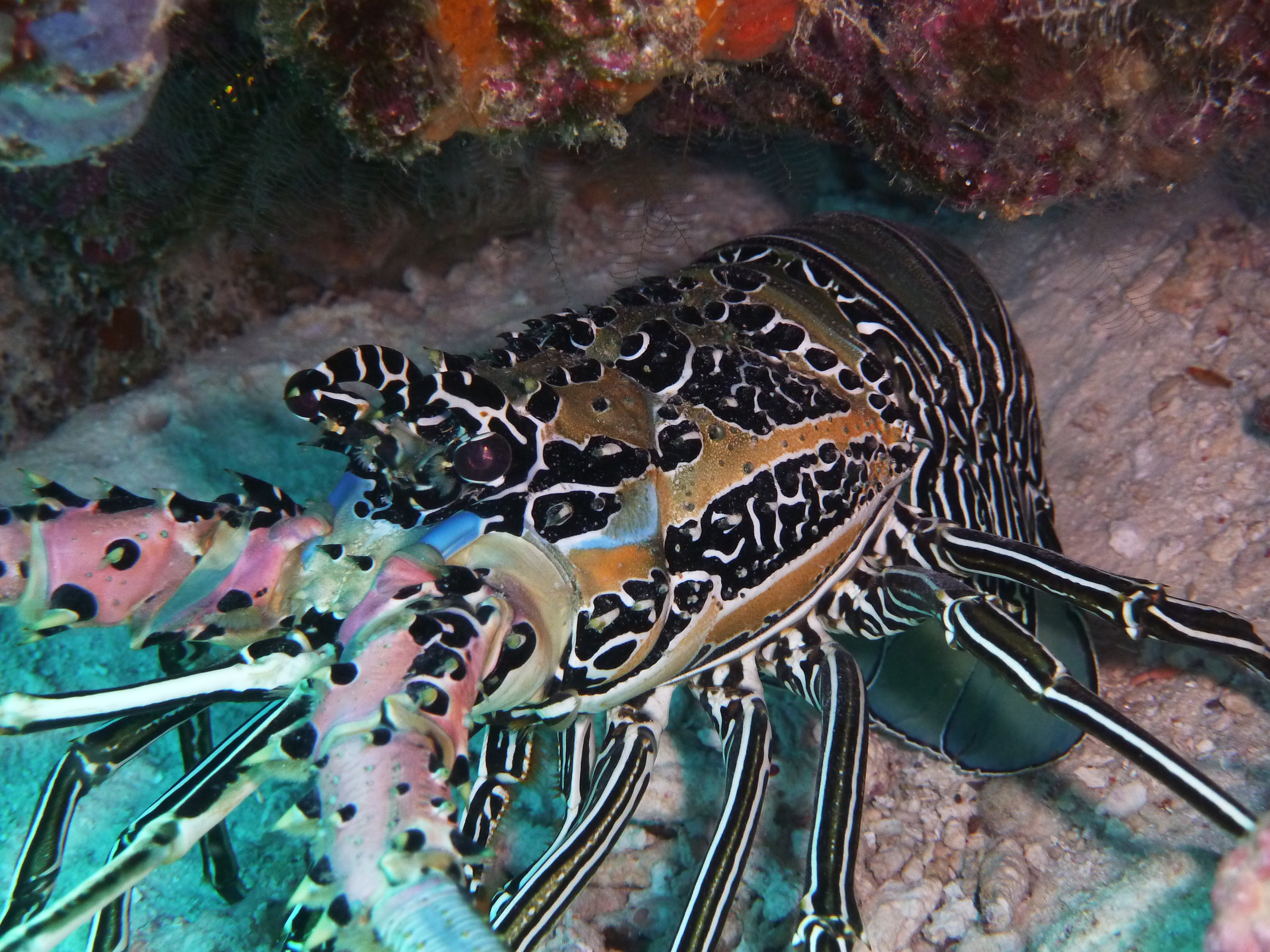
P. versicolor in Pom Pom Island. Dorsal view

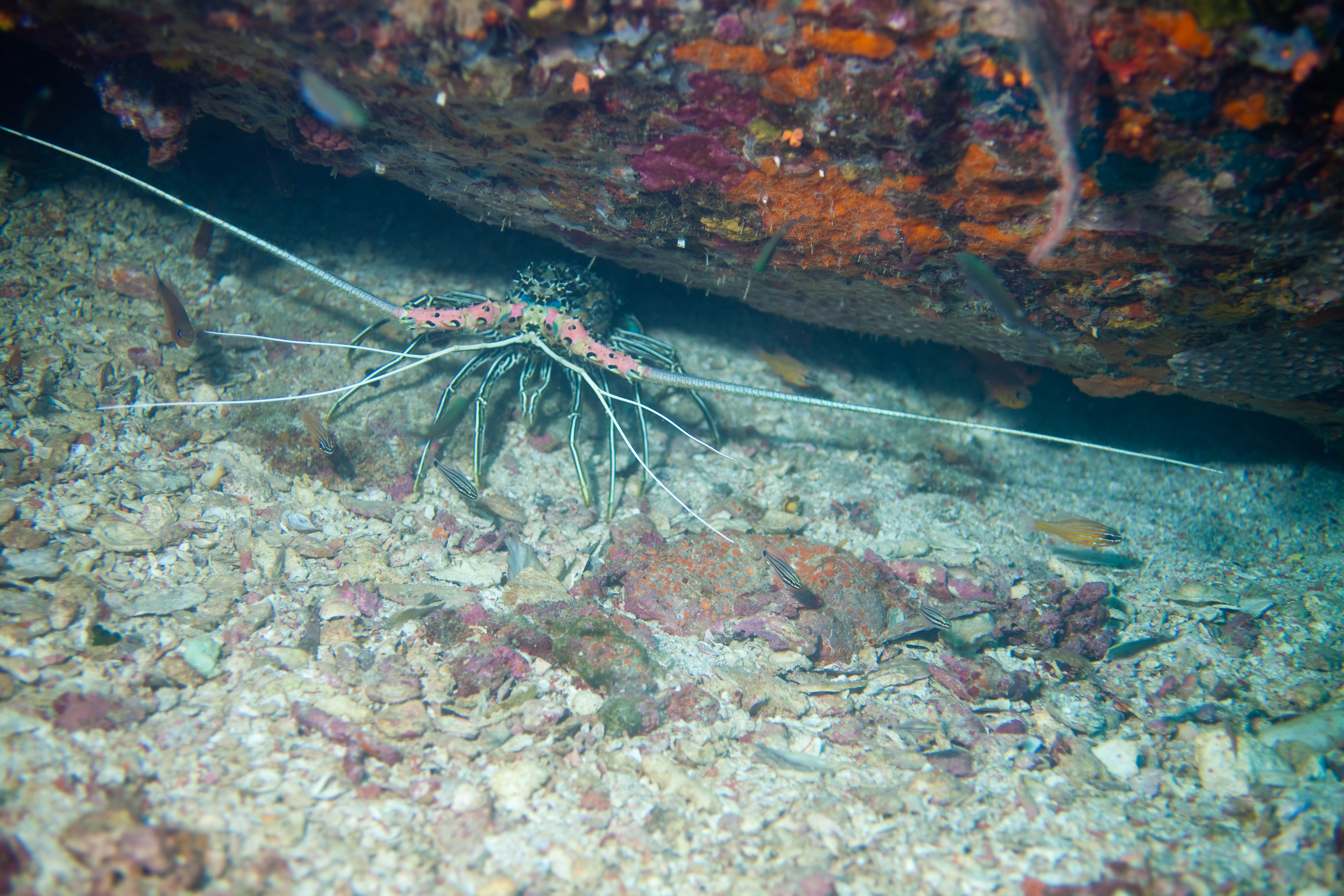
Front view
