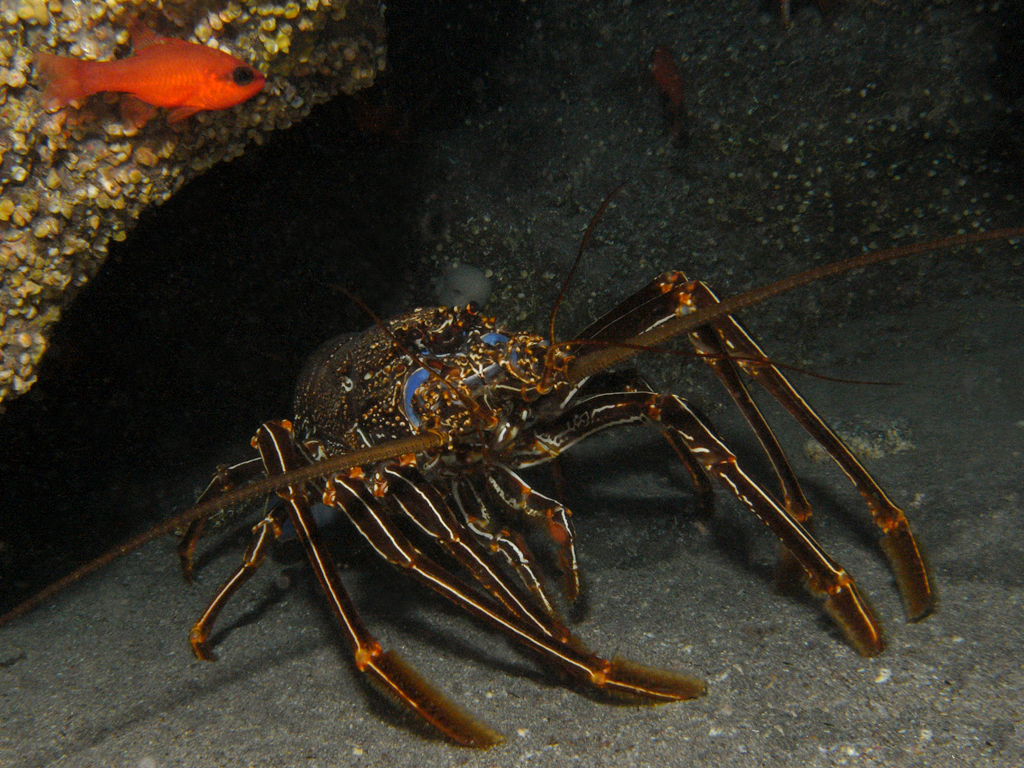

Conservation status
- Least Concern (IUCN 3.1)

Scientific classification
- Kingdom: Animalia
- Phylum: Arthropoda
- Class: Malacostraca
- Order: Decapoda
- Suborder: Pleocyemata
- Family: Palinuridae
- Genus: Panulirus
- Species: P. echinatus

Binomial name
- Panulirus echinatus Smith, 1869

= Panulirus echinatus =

Species of crustacean

Panulirus echinatus, the brown spiny lobster, is a species of spiny lobster that lives on rocky reefs in the tropical western Atlantic Ocean and central Atlantic Islands.

== Description ==
Like other spiny lobsters, Panulirus echinatus has no pincer-like chelae on its front walking legs. It differs from related species by having just two large spines on the antennular plate, just in front of the carapace, and the exopod of the third feeding appendage is reduced and bears no flagellum. The basic colour is brown with large white rounded spots. The antennules and limbs are brown and have longitudinal white or yellow markings. The average size varies over different parts of its range, with males growing to a carapace length of about 19 cm (7.5 in) and females 15 cm (5.9 in). Males are in general more numerous, larger and heavier than females but this may be because of behavioural differences, with females feeding less during the breeding season.

== Distribution and habitat ==
Panulirus echinatus is found off the coasts of northern Brazil and on the Atlantic Islands of Cape Verde, Saint Helena, Ascension Island, Tristan da Cunha and the Canary Islands. Its depth range is about 35 m (115 ft) though it is seldom deeper than 25 m (82 ft). It lives on rocks and among boulders, hiding in cracks and fissures during the day.

== Biology ==
Panulirus echinatus is a nocturnal generalist feeder and opportunistic browser. Examination of the stomach contents of animals caught on the Saint Peter and Saint Paul Archipelago show that the largest dietary item is fish, although it is not clear whether this is caught by the animal as prey or is the result of scavenging activity. Crustaceans formed part of the diet as did the green alga Caulerpa racemosa which is common in the study area. Another item consumed was calcareous algae scraped off the rock surface and this is likely to be an important source of calcium for the formation of the hard shell. Rock fragments found in the stomach are likely to have been ingested accidentally.

Females carry their egg mass around on their abdomens, under their tails, for several months until the eggs hatch. During this period the females are likely to hide away more in crevices and spend less time feeding. Males do not change their feeding behaviour during the breeding season. Little is known of the larval development of this species but the larvae are planktonic. A late-stage phyllosoma larva taken in mid-ocean has been shown by mitochondrial DNA analysis to belong to this species.

== Status ==
Panulirus echinatus has a wide distribution and seems to be very common within that range. It is harvested in most of the areas in which it is found and in Saint Helena and the Cape Verde Islands is fished commercially. The population trend is unclear but because of the fishing pressure throughout its range, the population is likely to have been reduced over the years. However, because of the high fecundity of the female, this spiny lobster is likely to be resilient and not suffer local extinctions. The International Union for Conservation of Nature has assessed its conservation status as being of "least concern".
