= Chinese spiny lobster =

Scientific classification
- Kingdom: Animalia
- Phylum: Arthropoda
- Class: Malacostraca
- Order: Decapoda
- Suborder: Pleocyemata
- Family: Palinuridae
- Genus: Panulirus
- Species: P. stimpsoni

Binomial name
- Panulirus stimpsoni Holthuis, 1963

Species of crustacean

The Chinese spiny lobster (Panulirus stimpsoni; Chinese: 中国龙虾), also known as the green lobster or Hong Kong rock lobster, is a member of the genus Panulirus of spiny lobsters endemic to the East and South China Seas. It is a moderate size, commercially important species with a range that extends along the east coast of China from Shanghai to Hong Kong. It has also been found in the Taiwan Strait.

The species name honors the American marine biologist William Stimpson, who originally identified the species as P. ornatus in 1860.

== Description ==
Panulirus stimpsoni is closely related to P. ornatus, which it was originally assigned to, with an identical arrangement of the spines on the carapace but the spines of P. stimpsoni are usually stronger than those of P. ornatus. Like P. ornatus and other spiny lobsters in the genus Panulirus, the larvae of P. stimpsoni are most likely retained in local estuarine waters. Like Panulirus polyphagus, P. stimpsoni lives on a coastal shelf with a high sediment load due to the muddy outflow of the Pearl River and other turbid, coastal streams.

=== Allergens ===
Like the American lobster, tropomyosin was identified as a major allergen of the Chinese spiny lobster.

== Ecology ==
The Chinese spiny lobster is omnivorous. In addition to its oceanic environment, it is also found in Baoan Lake where it predated upon by the common carp.

Panulirus stimpsoni is found in the shallow waters of rocky areas. Due to pollution, habitat loss, and over-fishing, the population has declined rapidly.

Although the species is considered endemic to China, lobster aquaculture has grown in Vietnam, with more than 1,000 tons of cage-raised Panulirus species, including P. stimpsoni, produced for export to China, Japan, Thailand, and Hong Kong. However, along with other lobster types, production has decreased since 2006 due to milky hemolymph syndrome.

== Conservation ==
The conservation status of Panulirus stimpsoni has not been evaluated based on the IUCN Red List criteria, despite being a fishery target species. It has been listed as an endangered species in China
