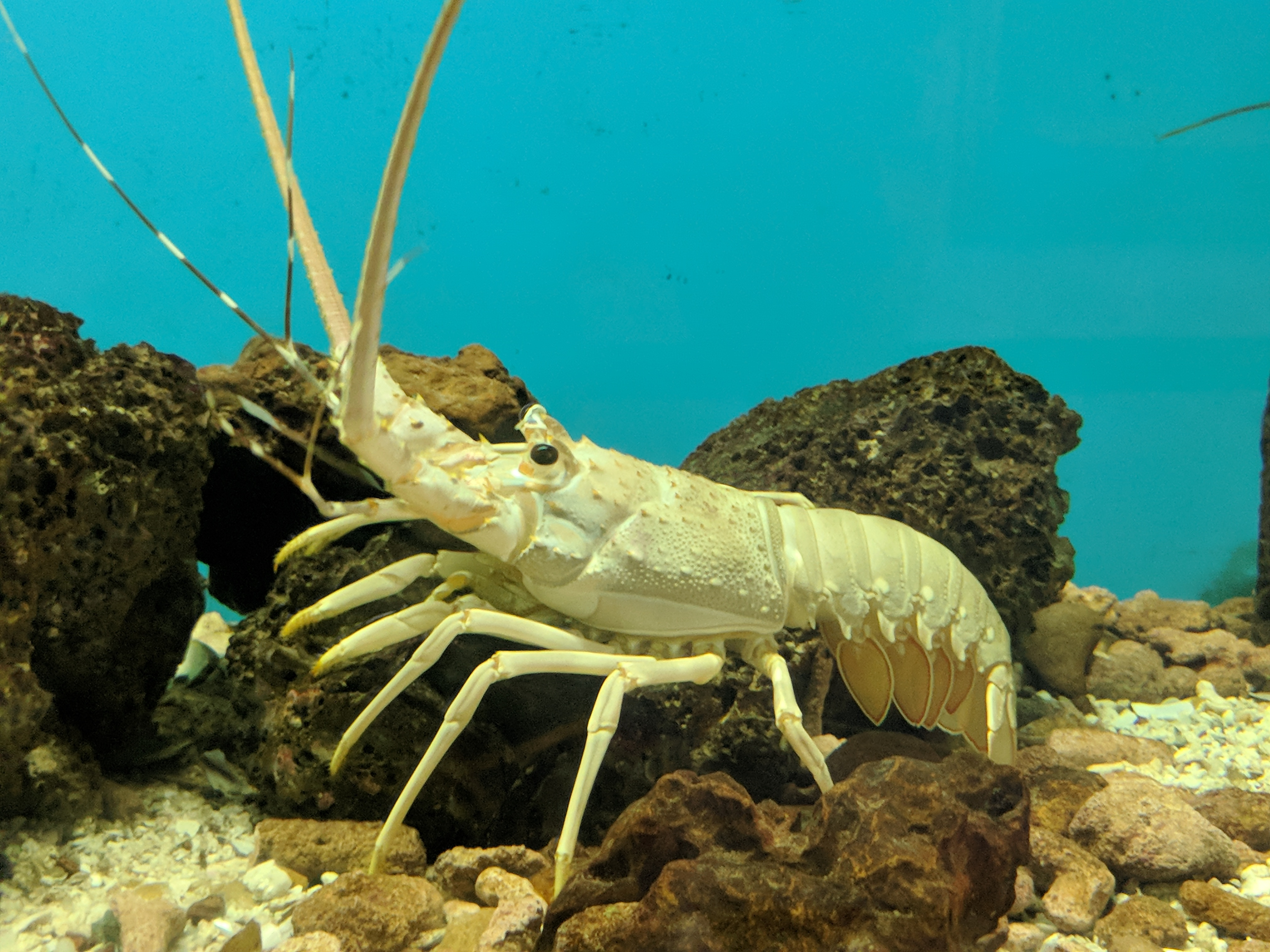

Conservation status
- Least Concern (IUCN 3.1)

Scientific classification
- Kingdom: Animalia
- Phylum: Arthropoda
- Class: Malacostraca
- Order: Decapoda
- Suborder: Pleocyemata
- Family: Palinuridae
- Genus: Panulirus
- Species: P. homarus

Binomial name
- Panulirus homarus (Linnaeus, 1758)

Subspecies
- P. h. homarus (Linnaeus, 1758); P. h. megasculpta (Pesta, 1915); P. h. rubellus Berry, 1974

Synonyms
- Cancer homarus Linnaeus, 1758; Astacus homarus (Linnaeus, 1758); Palinurus homarus (Linnaeus, 1758); Palinurus dasypus H. Milne-Edwards, 1837; Palinurus spinosus H. Milne-Edwards, 1837; Palinurus burgeri De Haan, 1841; Palinurus (Senex) buergeri (De Haan, 1841); Senex dasypus (H. Milne-Edwards, 1837); Panulirus dasypus (H. Milne-Edwards, 1837); Panulirus buergeri (De Haan, 1841)

= Panulirus homarus =

Species of crustacean

Panulirus homarus is a species of spiny lobster that lives along the coasts of the Indian and Pacific Oceans. It lives in shallow water, and feeds on the brown mussel Perna perna. It typically grows to a length of 20–25 cm (7.9–9.8 in). Alongside the dark green nominate subspecies, two red subspecies are recognised, one around the Arabian Peninsula, and one around southern Africa. It is the subject of small-scale fishery.

== Distribution ==
Panulirus homarus is found in the Indo-West Pacific region, from East Africa along the coast of the Indian Ocean, as far as the Malay Archipelago, and then along the coasts of the Pacific Ocean to Japan in the north and Australia, New Caledonia and probably the Marquesas Islands in the south.

Panulirus homarus lives in shallow water, usually 1–5 metres (3 ft 3 in – 16 ft 5 in) deep, including among rocks in the surf zone, but occasionally up to 90 m (300 ft), and in turbid water.

== Description ==
The body of P. homarus can reach up to 31 centimetres (12 in) in total length, or a carapace length of 12 cm (4.7 in), but the average is around 20–25 cm (8–10 in).

There is variation in the colouration, which parallels other morphological differences; most animals are dark green and have only very small squamae in the grooves of the abdominal tergites. Other animals are red, and have much more prominent sculpturation in the grooves on the abdominal tergites. The green form is known as the microsculpta form, and the red form as the megasculpta form.

=== Subspecies ===
Three subspecies of P. homarus are recognised, with the marked difference between the microsculpta form and the megasculpta form of the animal being used to separate them. Linnaeus' original description of the species was based on microsculpta material, so the nominate subspecies, P. h. homarus, is used for that subspecies. It is found throughout the species range. The megasculpta form occurs in two distinct geographical areas, each of which is considered a separate subspecies: P. h. megasculpta in southern Arabia and Socotra, and P. h. rubellus off the coasts of Madagascar and Southern Africa.

== Ecology ==
Panulirus homarus is nocturnal and gregarious. It feeds mostly on the brown mussel Perna perna. In South Africa, it is one of the main prey items for the Cape clawless otter.

== Fishery ==
In South Africa, P. homarus was only the subject of small-scale fisheries until 1969, when a company was formed to exploit it. It is also the most important species of spiny lobster to the lobster fisheries of Tamil Nadu and Kerala (India), although in East Africa, it is one of the less common species; the annual catch off Somalia is around 120 t. It is also caught in the Philippines, Taiwan and Thailand. Vietnam has lobster aquaculture based on the grow-out of wild caught juveniles. In Australia, hatchery technology is poised for commercialization.

== Taxonomic history ==
Panulirus homarus was named Cancer homarus in Carl Linnaeus' Systema Naturae in 1758, the starting point for zoological nomenclature. The original description was simply "[Cancer] macrourus, thorace antrorsum aculeato, manibus adactylis", with a type locality of Mari Asiatico. The lectotype is the animal portrayed in a watercolour published in 1705 in Georg Eberhard Rumphius' Amboinsche Rariteitkamer. The original specimen, which was in the collection of Henricus d'Acquet, the burgomaster of Delft has been lost, but the illustration survives, and is held in the Tropenmuseum in Amsterdam. Despite the vague location given by Linnaeus, the legend to the illustration makes it clear that the specimen was from Ambon, Indonesia.

Henri Milne-Edwards' species Palinurus spinosus is probably a subjective synonym of P. homarus. His description could apply to any of P. homarus, P. interruptus and P. regius, but the colours he described most closely resemble those of P. homarus.
