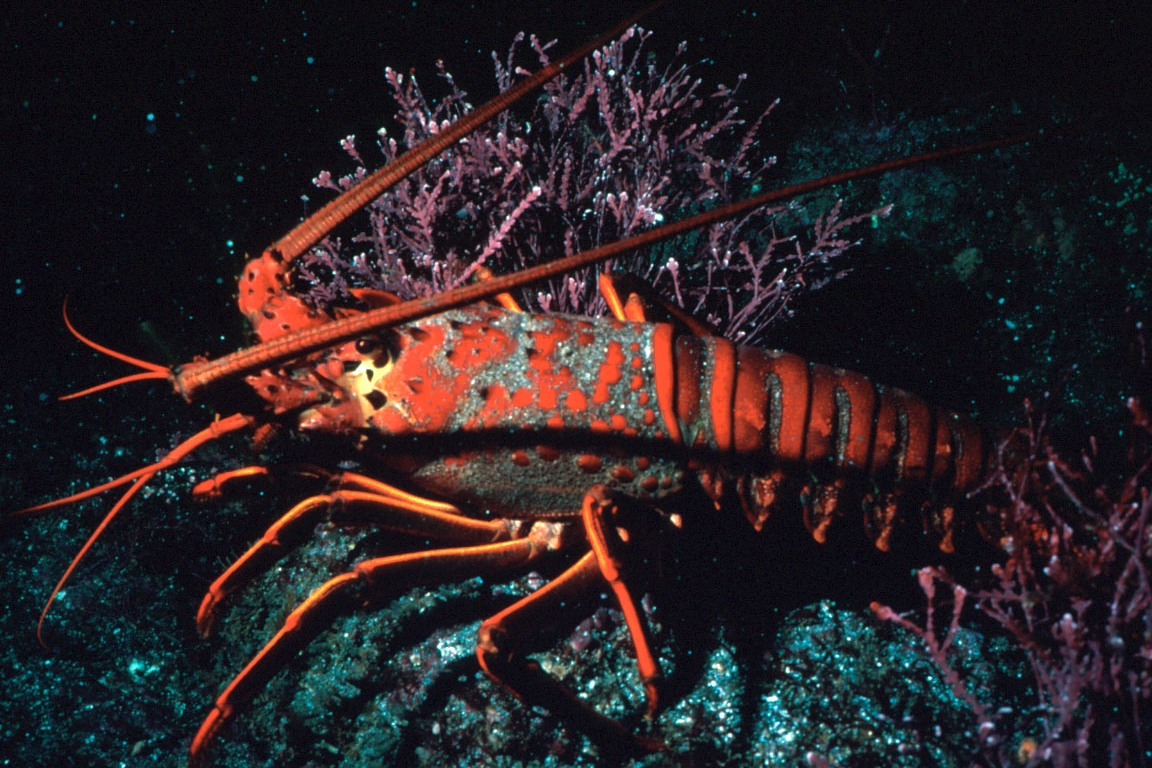
- Panulirus interruptus

Scientific classification
- Kingdom: Animalia
- Phylum: Arthropoda
- Clade: Pancrustacea
- Class: Malacostraca
- Order: Decapoda
- Suborder: Pleocyemata
- Family: Palinuridae
- Genus: Panulirus; White, 1847

Type species
- Panulirus japonicus (Von Siebold, 1824)

= Panulirus =

Genus of spiny lobster

Panulirus is a genus of spiny lobsters in the family Palinuridae, including those species which have long flagella on their first antennae.

== Species ==
It contains the following species:

Image	Name	Common name	Distribution
	Panulirus argus (Latreille, 1804)	Caribbean spiny lobster	western Atlantic Ocean
	Panulirus brunneiflagellum Sekiguchi & George, 2005		Ogasawara Group (Bonin Islands) of southern Japan
	Panulirus cygnus George, 1962	western rock lobster.	west coast of Australia
	Panulirus echinatus Smith, 1869	brown spiny lobster	tropical western Atlantic Ocean and central Atlantic Islands.
	Panulirus femoristriga (von Martens, 1872)	stripe-leg spiny lobster	Indo-Pacific.
	Panulirus gracilis Streets, 1871	green spiny lobster	Eastern Pacific: From Baja California Sur to the west coast of Peru and the Galapagos Islands.
	Panulirus guttatus (Latreille, 1804)	spotted spiny lobster or Guinea chick lobster	western Atlantic Ocean and the Caribbean Sea. Its range extends from Bermuda, the Bahamas, southern Florida and the West Indies, to Curaçao, Bonaire, Los Roques and Suriname
	Panulirus homarus (Linnaeus, 1758)		coasts of the Indian and Pacific Oceans
	Panulirus inflatus (Bouvier, 1895)	blue spiny lobster	Eastern Central Pacific: Mexico.
	Panulirus interruptus (Randall, 1840)	California spiny lobster	eastern Pacific Ocean from Monterey Bay, California to the Gulf of Tehuantepec, Mexico.
	Panulirus japonicus (von Siebold, 1824)	Japanese spiny lobster	the Pacific Ocean around Japan, China, and Korea.
	Panulirus laevicauda (Latreille, 1817)	smoothtail spiny lobster	Western Atlantic
	Panulirus longipes (A. Milne-Edwards, 1868)	longlegged spiny lobster	tropical Indo-Pacific
	Panulirus marginatus (Quoy & Gaimard, 1825)		Hawaiian Islands
	Panulirus meripurpuratus (Giraldes & Smyth,2016)		Pernambuco state, northeastern coast of Brazil.
	Panulirus ornatus (Fabricius, 1798)	tropical rock lobster, ornate rock lobster, ornate spiny lobster and ornate tropical rock lobster	Indo-Pacific, from the Red Sea and KwaZulu-Natal in the west to Japan and Fiji in the east
	Panulirus pascuensis Reed, 1954	Easter Island spiny lobster	Easter Island and the Pitcairn Islands in the Pacific Ocean
	Panulirus penicillatus (Olivier, 1791)	variegated crayfish, tufted spiny lobster, spiny lobster, Socorro spiny lobster, red lobster, pronghorn spiny lobster, golden rock lobster, double spined rock lobster and coral cray	tropical Indo-Pacific region
	Panulirus polyphagus (Herbst, 1793)	mud spiny lobster	tropical Indo-Pacific region.
	Panulirus regius De Brito Capello, 1864	royal spiny lobster	Eastern Atlantic and the Mediterranean
	Panulirus stimpsoni Holthuis, 1963	Chinese spiny lobster	Indo-West Pacific
	Panulirus versicolor (Latreille, 1804)	painted rock lobster, common rock lobster, bamboo lobster, blue lobster, and blue spiny lobster	western Pacific and the Indian Ocean
