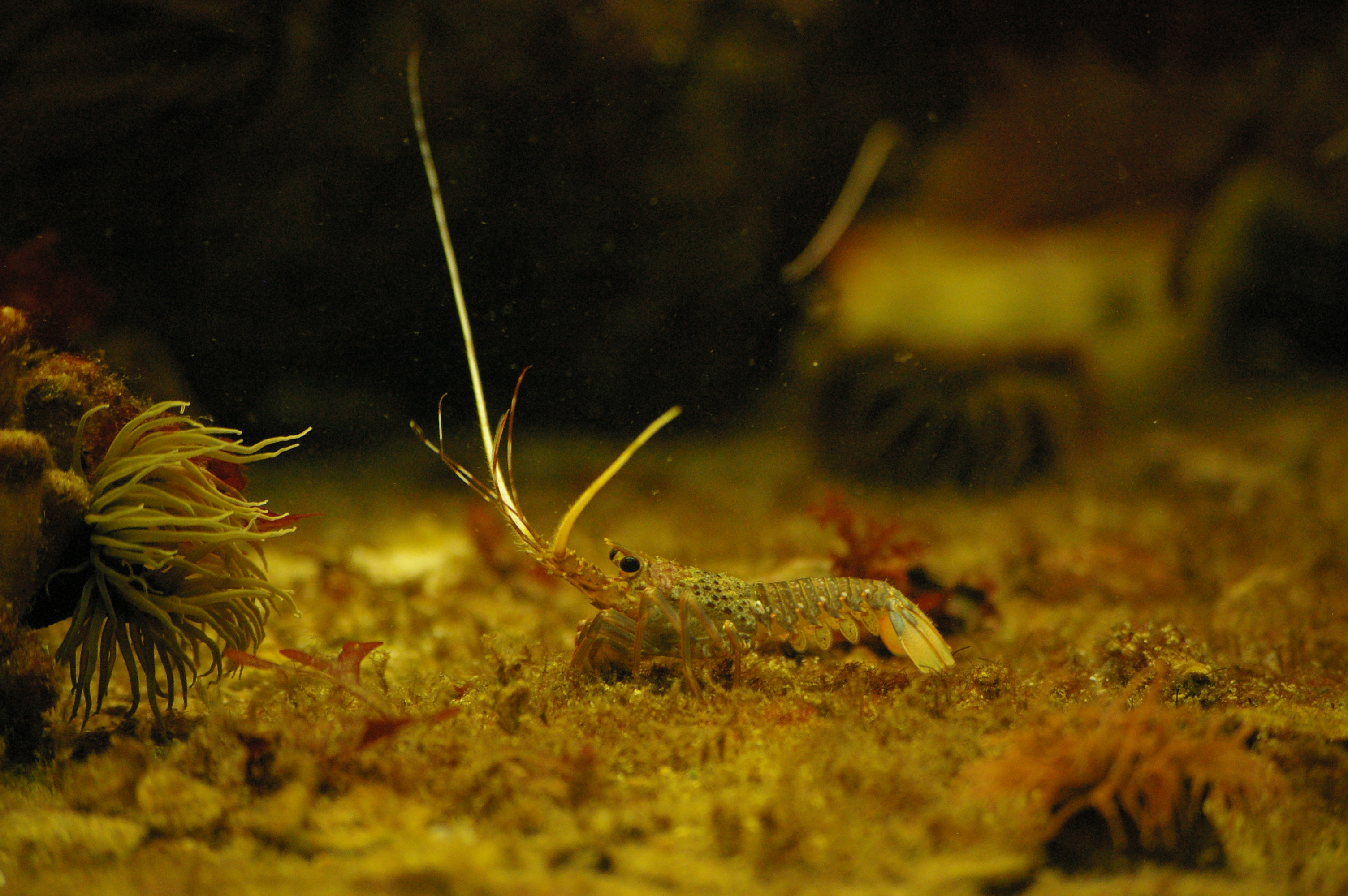
- Juvenile P. cygnus

Conservation status
- Least Concern (IUCN 3.1)

Scientific classification
- Kingdom: Animalia
- Phylum: Arthropoda
- Clade: Pancrustacea
- Class: Malacostraca
- Order: Decapoda
- Suborder: Pleocyemata
- Family: Palinuridae
- Genus: Panulirus
- Species: P. cygnus

Binomial name
- Panulirus cygnus George, 1962

= Panulirus cygnus =

Species of crustacean

An adult Panulirus cygnus in an aquarium

Panulirus cygnus is a species of spiny lobster (family Palinuridae), found off the west coast of Australia. Panulirus cygnus is the basis of Australia's most valuable fishery, making up 20% of value of Australia's total fishing industry, and is identified as the western rock lobster.

== Taxonomy ==
Panulirus cygnus was previously classified under several taxonomic arrangements, the description as a new species was published in 1962. The Western Australian crayfish was identified in 1916 as Panulirus penicillatus (Olivier, 1791). This was reassessed at the British Museum by Isabella Gordon in 1936 as Panulirus longipes at the request of Ludwig Glauert, a diagnosis that was conserved, despite further doubts, due to its extensive use by the state's crayfishing industry and associated legislation. The author, Ray George, recognised the similarities to other species of Panulirus in a comparative study, but proposed the anatomical characteristics were of an undescribed species.

The generic name is an anagram of Palinurus, as with other genera of its nominal family Palinuridae, the spiny lobsters. The name is derived from Palinurus, mentioned in the Aeneid, whose improper burial caused his soul to drift near the coast to the open seas; an appropriate metaphor for the habits of the spiny lobsters that develop near the coast and migrate away from it.

The specific epithet is named for an emblem of Western Australia, the black swan Cygnus atratus. The holotype was collected by George in a pool on Rottnest Island, at a depth of 1 metre, and preserved at the state's museum; other specimens in their collection were reclassified as paratypes. George's taxon was recognised as a subspecies until the 1970s, when a revision elevated the population to the rank of species. The recognition of the species was relevant to the conservation of its related fishing industry, it is unique to the region and could not be naturally repopulated from other regions.

Common names of the species include "western rock lobster", "Australian spiny lobster", "crayfish" or "crays". The common names of "lobster", "homard" and "yabbie" are also used to refer to this species, along with many other crustaceans.

== Description ==
The species has five pairs of legs that are used to move across the ocean floor, with the fifth set possessing claws in the females, and six smaller pairs are located at the mouth. The eyes are located at the ends of the stalks. They vary in colour from a brownish purple to a pale colour. The exoskeleton is segmented, and must be shed as the animal grows. The largest recorded specimen is 5.5 kilograms (12 lb), but a maximum weight of 5 kg (11 lb) is considered typical. The average accepted form of measurement, that of the carapace, is from 80 to 100 millimetres (3.1 to 3.9 in) in length.

== Distribution ==
The range of the species is along the coast of Western Australia, from Hamelin Bay to the North West Cape, and at islands such as the Houtman Abrolhos. The larvae of the species develop in the meadows of seagrasses of Western Australia, migrating out from these toward the deeper ocean and coral reefs such as the Abrolhos Islands.

== Fisheries ==
The annual catch is 8,000–15,000 tonnes. The value of production in 2003/2004 was A$248 million. The fishery was one of the first in the world to be certified as ecologically sustainable by the Marine Stewardship Council. The western coastline contains eight species of rock lobster, but the harvest primarily targets Panulirus cygnus.

The species is known to have been caught since the settlement of Swan River Colony, in 1829, and expanded as the larger populations were discovered in remote locations of the state. The industry came to be centred at the Houtman Abrolhos, at the edge of the continental shelf, where the mature crays occur in large populations. A cannery was established at the islands to export the seasonal catch in the 1930s. The early industry claimed to harvest up to fourteen species, however, research into the Abrolhos populations recognised only three.

The population harvested near Dongara is reputed to be a greater delicacy amongst consumers, although investigation of that catch did not reveal any morphological distinctions from other populations.

Western Rock Lobsters are found locally to Rottnest Island.

== See also ==
- Southern rock lobster
