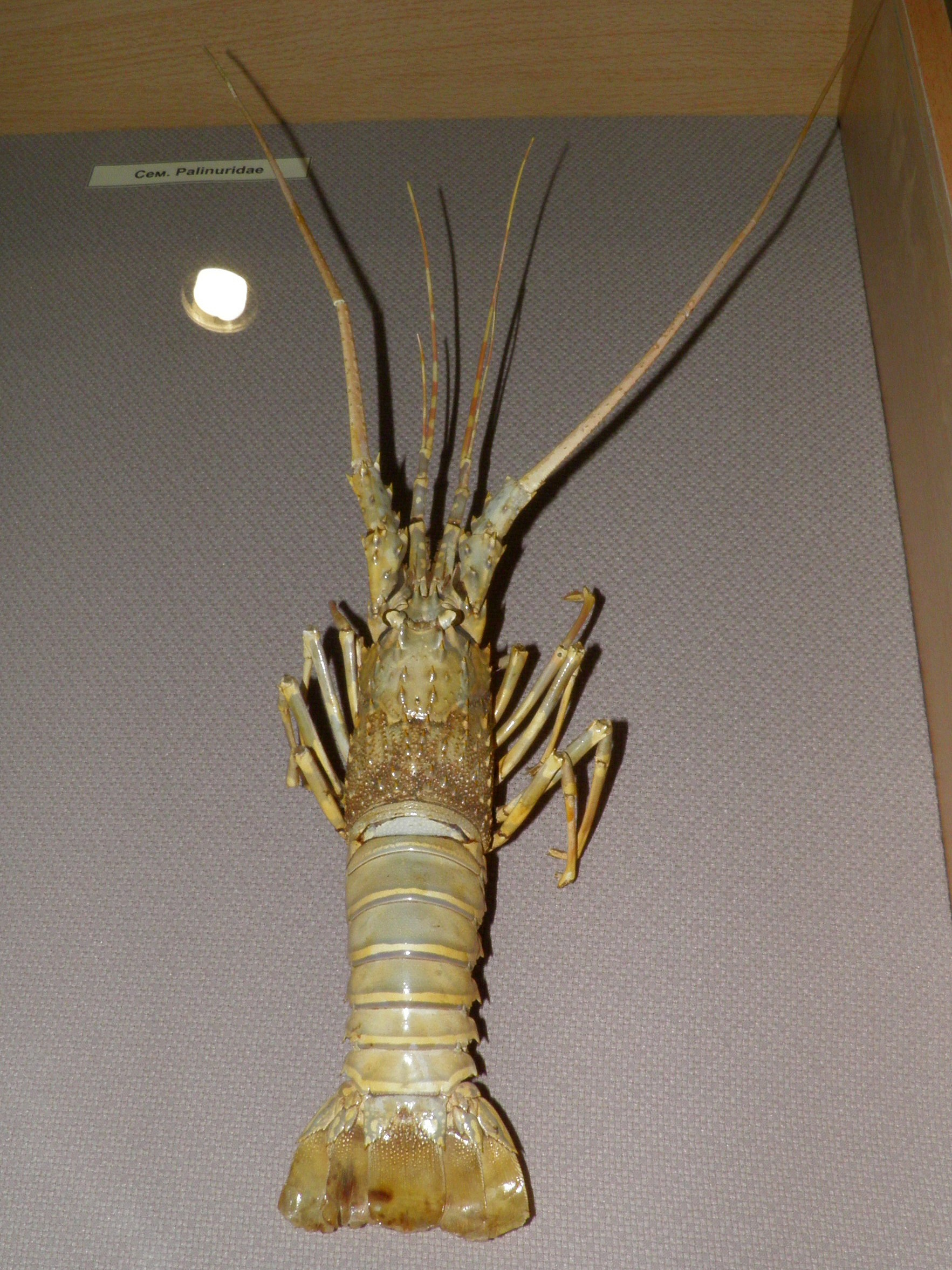

Conservation status
- Least Concern (IUCN 3.1)

Scientific classification
- Kingdom: Animalia
- Phylum: Arthropoda
- Class: Malacostraca
- Order: Decapoda
- Suborder: Pleocyemata
- Family: Palinuridae
- Genus: Panulirus
- Species: P. polyphagus

Binomial name
- Panulirus polyphagus (Herbst, 1793)

Synonyms
- Cancer (Astacus) polyphagus Herbst, 1793; Palinurus fasciatus Fabricius, 1798; Panulirus fasciatus (Fabricius, 1798); Panulirus orientalis Doflein, 1900

= Panulirus polyphagus =

Species of crustacean

Panulirus polyphagus, the mud spiny lobster, is a species of crustacean that lives on shallow rocky reefs and muddy substrates in the tropical Indo-Pacific region. The International Union for Conservation of Nature has assessed its conservation status as being of "least concern".

== Description ==
Panulirus polyphagus grows to a length of about 40 cm (16 in). The antennal plate bears two large spines and there are no transverse grooves on the abdominal segments. Distinctive colour features by which this species can be distinguished from other spiny lobsters include a greenish-grey background colour and a thin white band near the hind edge of each segment. In Europe, the otherwise similar native species, the north eastern Atlantic spiny crawfish (Panulirus regius), has four large spines on the antennal plate, and smooth grooves on the abdominal segments.

== Distribution and habitat ==
Panulirus polyphagus has a wide distribution in the tropical Indo-Pacific region. Its range extends from India and Pakistan, through the Philippines and Indonesia to northwestern Australia and southeastern New Guinea. It is usually found on rocky reefs or on muddy seabeds, often at the mouths of rivers, at depths down to 40 m (131 ft) and exceptionally to more than double this depth. This spiny lobster is sometimes imported into Europe and may be found at markets in continental Europe and the United Kingdom.

== Status ==
This species is caught for human consumption. It is harvested in India in the Mumbai region and the northwest between November and March, but seems to be overexploited as catches are declining in size. It is also caught in Indian waters as bycatch, especially on muddy substrates. In Thailand there is a commercial fishery with the spiny lobsters being sold in local markets.
