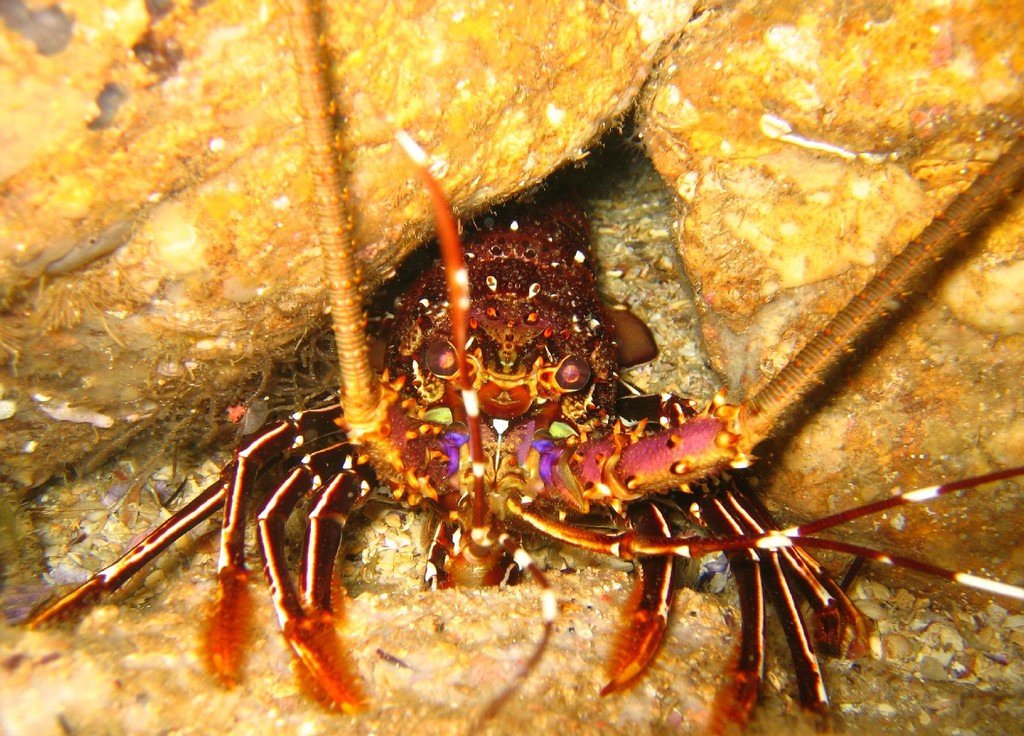
- Hiding in a rock crevice in New South Wales

Conservation status
- Least Concern (IUCN 3.1)

Scientific classification
- Kingdom: Animalia
- Phylum: Arthropoda
- Clade: Pancrustacea
- Class: Malacostraca
- Order: Decapoda
- Suborder: Pleocyemata
- Family: Palinuridae
- Genus: Panulirus
- Species: P. penicillatus

Binomial name
- Panulirus penicillatus (Olivier, 1791)

= Panulirus penicillatus =

Species of crustacean

Panulirus penicillatus is a species of spiny lobster that lives on shallow rocky and coral reefs in the tropical Indo-Pacific region. Common names for this spiny lobster include variegated crayfish, tufted spiny lobster, spiny lobster, Socorro spiny lobster, red lobster, pronghorn spiny lobster, golden rock lobster, double spined rock lobster and coral cray. It has a very wide range and the International Union for Conservation of Nature has assessed its conservation status as being of "least concern".

== Description ==
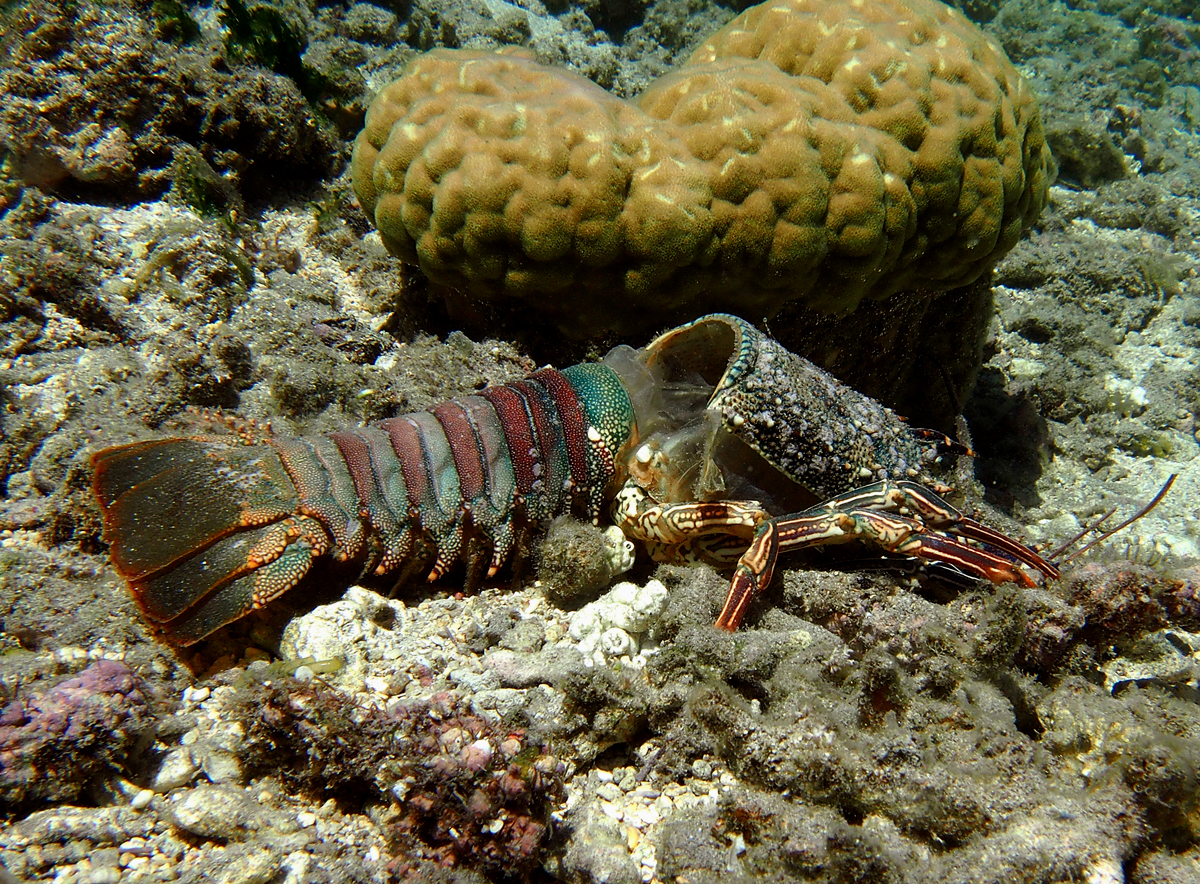
Shed exoskeleton

Spiny lobsters differ from true lobsters in having large spiny antennae and lacking pincers on their front legs. Panulirus penicillatus grows to a maximum length of about 40 centimetres (16 in), but a more normal length is 30 centimetres (12 in), with males growing to larger sizes than females. There is a group of four strong spines joined at the base, attached to the plate immediately in front of the carapace to which the antennules are attached. The colour of this spiny lobster is variable, ranging from yellowish-green to rusty-brown or bluish-black. There are small white spots on the carapace and abdomen and a pair of larger white spots near the outer edge of the first abdominal segment. The legs are dark green or red with yellow longitudinal stripes. The antennules are not banded.

== Distribution and habitat ==
Panulirus penicillatus occurs in the tropical and subtropical Indian and Pacific Oceans. Its range extends from the eastern coast of Africa and the Red Sea to Thailand, Japan, Australia, the Pacific archipelagos, the Galapagos Islands and islands off the coast of Mexico. It is found in shallow water, usually at depths of less than 4 metres (13 ft) on rocky surfaces, on the outer slopes of reefs and in water channels, where it hides in crevices during the daytime and emerges at night.

== Status ==
While P. penicillatus is heavily exploited for food throughout its wide range, this does not seem to have had a large impact on total populations, although some local populations may be declining. The age of maturity has not been studied, but closely related species become mature at three to four years of age. The longevity is probably at least ten years and the female fecundity is several hundred thousand eggs. For these reasons, the International Union for Conservation of Nature has assessed the conservation status of this spiny lobster as being of "least concern".
