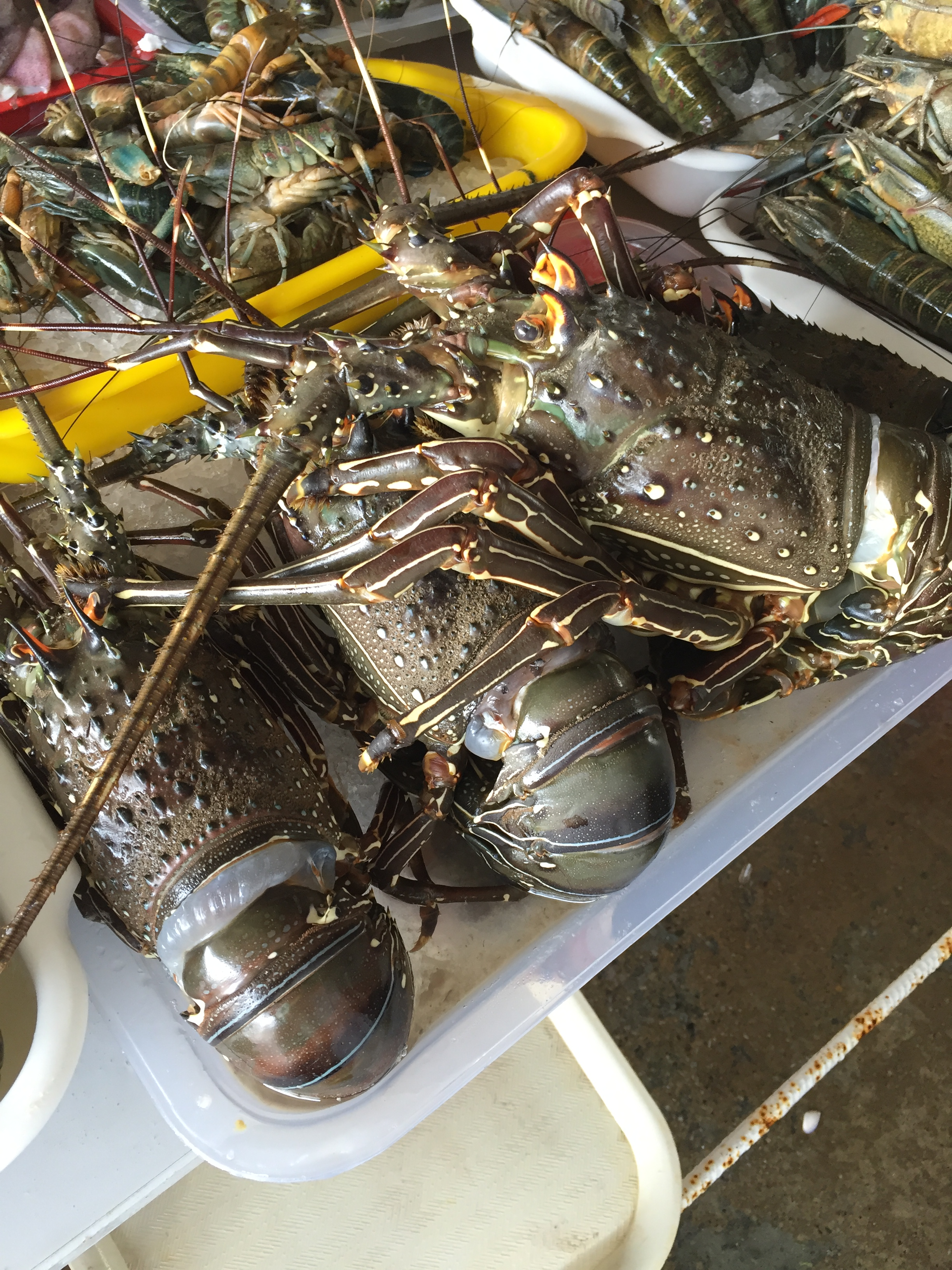

Conservation status
- Data Deficient (IUCN 3.1)

Scientific classification
- Kingdom: Animalia
- Phylum: Arthropoda
- Clade: Pancrustacea
- Class: Malacostraca
- Order: Decapoda
- Suborder: Pleocyemata
- Family: Palinuridae
- Genus: Panulirus
- Species: P. gracilis

Binomial name
- Panulirus gracilis Streets, 1871

= Panulirus gracilis =

Species of crustacean

Panulirus gracilis, the green spiny lobster, is a crustacean species described by Thomas Hale Streets 1871. Panulirus gracilis is part of the genus Panulirus and the Palinuridae family . IUCN categorizes the species globally as insufficiently studied. No subspecies are listed in the Catalog of Life.

The species is frequently captured under legal size, which jeopardizes it reproductive cycle.
