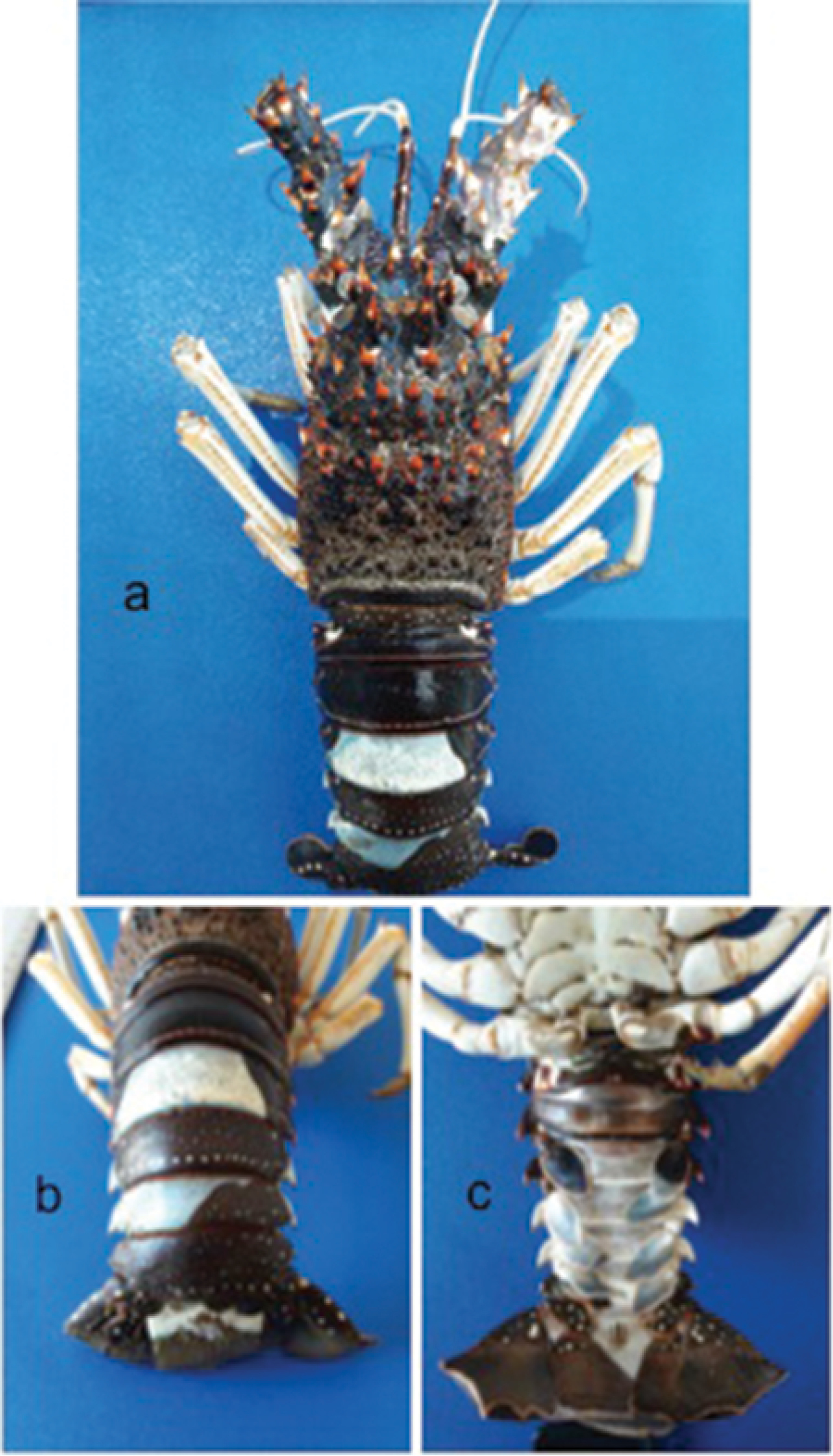
- a. Complete dorsal view, b. Partial dorsal view, c Partial ventral view.

Conservation status
- Least Concern (IUCN 3.1)

Scientific classification
- Kingdom: Animalia
- Phylum: Arthropoda
- Class: Malacostraca
- Order: Decapoda
- Suborder: Pleocyemata
- Family: Palinuridae
- Genus: Panulirus
- Species: P. inflatus

Binomial name
- Panulirus inflatus (Bouvier, 1895)

= Panulirus inflatus =

Species of crustacean

Panulirus inflatus, the blue spiny lobster, is a species of crustacean in the family Palinuridae (spiny lobsters). It is found at rocky reefs to depths of 30 m (100 ft) in the Pacific Ocean off Mexico, ranging from Baja California to Chiapas. It is commonly caught in artisanal fisheries, but the species is not threatened, being categorized as least concern by the IUCN. There are no subspecies.
