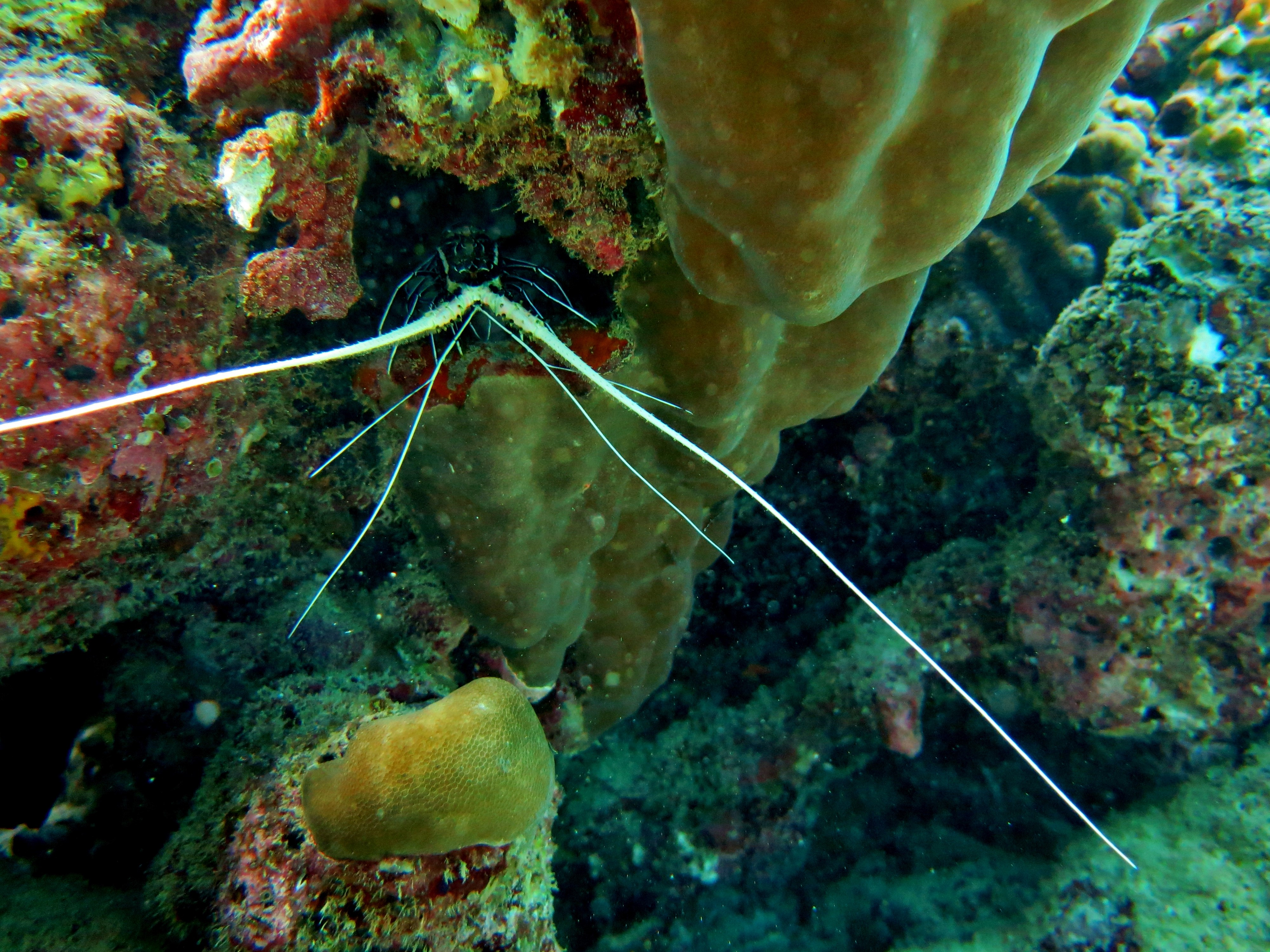

Conservation status
- Least Concern (IUCN 3.1)

Scientific classification
- Kingdom: Animalia
- Phylum: Arthropoda
- Class: Malacostraca
- Order: Decapoda
- Suborder: Pleocyemata
- Family: Palinuridae
- Genus: Panulirus
- Species: P. femoristriga

Binomial name
- Panulirus femoristriga (von Martens, 1872)

= Panulirus femoristriga =

Species of crustacean

Panulirus femoristriga is a species of spiny lobster (family Palinuridae). It occurs in the Indian and Pacific Oceans. IUCN categorizes the species globally as of "least concern". No subspecies are listed in the Catalog of Life.
