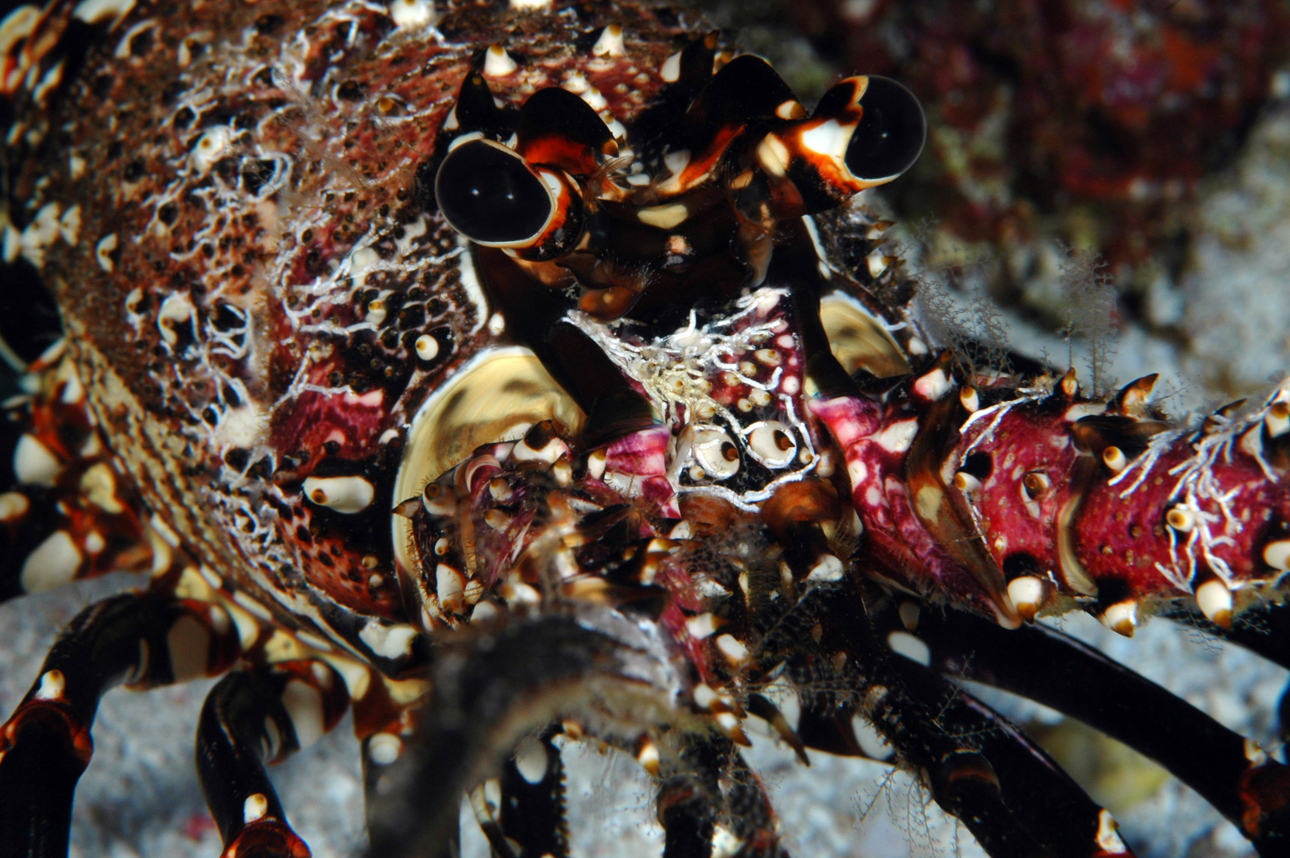

Conservation status
- Data Deficient (IUCN 3.1)

Scientific classification
- Kingdom: Animalia
- Phylum: Arthropoda
- Clade: Pancrustacea
- Class: Malacostraca
- Order: Decapoda
- Suborder: Pleocyemata
- Family: Palinuridae
- Genus: Panulirus
- Species: P. marginatus

Binomial name
- Panulirus marginatus (Quoy & Gaimard, 1825)

= Panulirus marginatus =

Species of crustacean

Panulirus marginatus, also known as the Hawaiian spiny lobster, banded spiny lobster, or ula in Hawaiian, is a species of spiny lobster in the family Palinuridae which is endemic to the Hawaiian Islands. It is the subject of extensive commercial and recreational fisheries.

== Description ==
P. marginatus can reach a total body length of about 40cm, with its carapace length reaching about 12cm. They have an exoskeleton that encases them and protects them from predators. This exoskeleton is molted periodically as the lobster grows and ages. Shortly after molting, the lobsters are in a more vulnerable state and therefore go deep into their hiding so that they can be safer until their carapace hardens once again. Spiny lobsters do not have the large claws like some other lobster species.

== Distribution & habitat ==
P. marginatus is endemic to the Hawaiian Islands, as its colloquial name, Hawaiian spiny lobster, implies. They can be found anywhere from the Hawaiian Islands to the Pearl and Hermes Atoll, and have also been found around Laysan Island.

They are usually found in shallow, warm waters around 62m deep and between 23 - 24°C (73.4 - 75.2°F). They are nocturnal and known to hide in protected spaces under rocks and in crevices.

== Human consumption ==
P. marginatus are often eaten, raw or cooked. They are easy to find and catch due to often being found in shallow waters. They are now a protected species in Hawaii, and regulations work to maintain their population. These regulations state that no spiny lobsters may be caught between May and August, and no females with eggs may ever be taken.

== Cultural significance ==
P. marginatus was sometimes used in place of pigs during religious sacrificial offerings.
