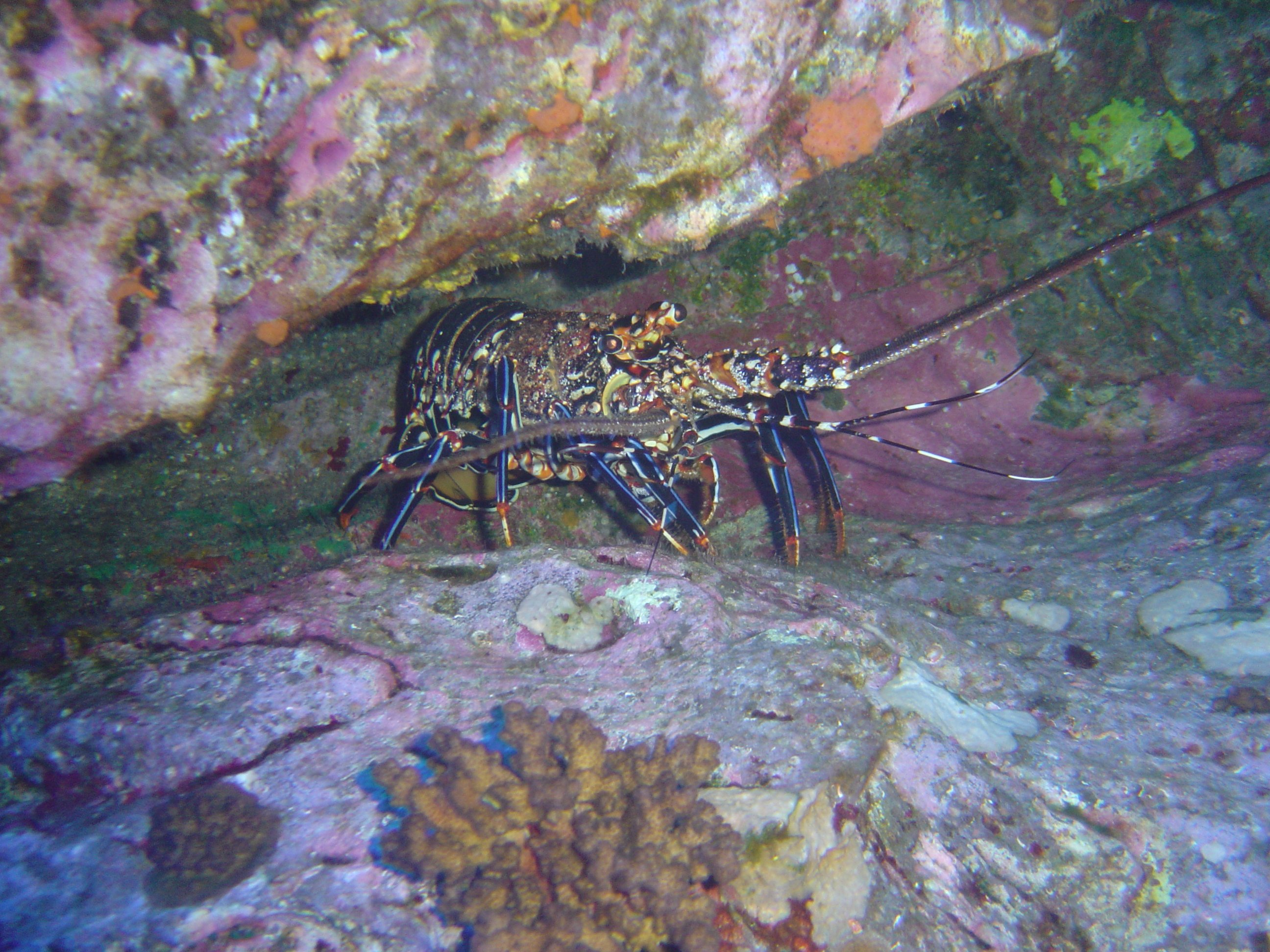

Conservation status
- Data Deficient (IUCN 3.1)

Scientific classification
- Kingdom: Animalia
- Phylum: Arthropoda
- Class: Malacostraca
- Order: Decapoda
- Suborder: Pleocyemata
- Family: Palinuridae
- Genus: Panulirus
- Species: P. pascuensis

Binomial name
- Panulirus pascuensis Reed, 1954

Synonyms
- Palinurus paschalis Holthuis, 1972

= Panulirus pascuensis =

Species of crustacean

Panulirus pascuensis is a species of spiny lobster found around Easter Island and the Pitcairn Islands in the Pacific Ocean. It is known in English as the Easter Island spiny lobster, Langosta de Isla de Pascua in Spanish and Ura in the Rapa Nui language. This lobster is fished on a small scale for local consumption.

== Description ==
Adults grow to a total length of 15–25 centimetres (6–10 in), with a carapace 6–10 cm (2.4–3.9 in) long. The antennal plate is visible in front of the carapace and has two large spines. The first pair of antennae are forked and the second pair are long, thick and spiny. There are long, slender flagella at the tips of the antennae. There are no claws on the first four pairs of walking legs. The colour of this spiny lobster is dark greenish purple with pale transverse bands on the posterior edge of the abdominal segments. The base of the tail fan has pale spots and the antennae are a uniform colour. The walking legs have slender longitudinal pale stripes.

== Distribution and habitat ==
Panulirus pascuensis is native to the south eastern Pacific Ocean, round the coasts of Easter Island and Pitcairn Island at depths of up to 5 metres (16 ft). It is also reported from the Austral Islands in French Polynesia. It is found on rocky shores and tends to hide during the day under boulders and in crevices.

== Biology ==
Like other spiny lobsters, Panulirus pascuensis feeds at night and is an omnivore and scavenger. Its diet consists of slow moving prey such as molluscs, echinoderms, crustaceans and chitons, supplemented with fish carcases or other carrion. Although it has no crushing claws, its mandibles are powerful and can break open bivalve and gastropod shells. The larvae spend over a year as part of the plankton before settling on the seabed and undergoing metamorphosis into juveniles.

== Status ==
Panulirus pascuensis is collected by hand or with a spear for human consumption on Easter and Pitcairn Islands. Gill nets and lobster pots are also sometimes used and at night a torch is employed. The IUCN has listed this lobster in the Red List of Threatened Species as "Data Deficient" because insufficient information is available to assess its population size and trend. The main threat to this lobster may be tourism, as the Easter Islanders are keen to attract more visitors and the Easter Island spiny lobster is the seafood dish of choice to serve to them at local restaurants. It is a traditional food of the Rapanui, the native Polynesian inhabitants of the island, and is represented on many rock engravings.
