= Phyllosoma =

Larval form of crustaceans in Achelata

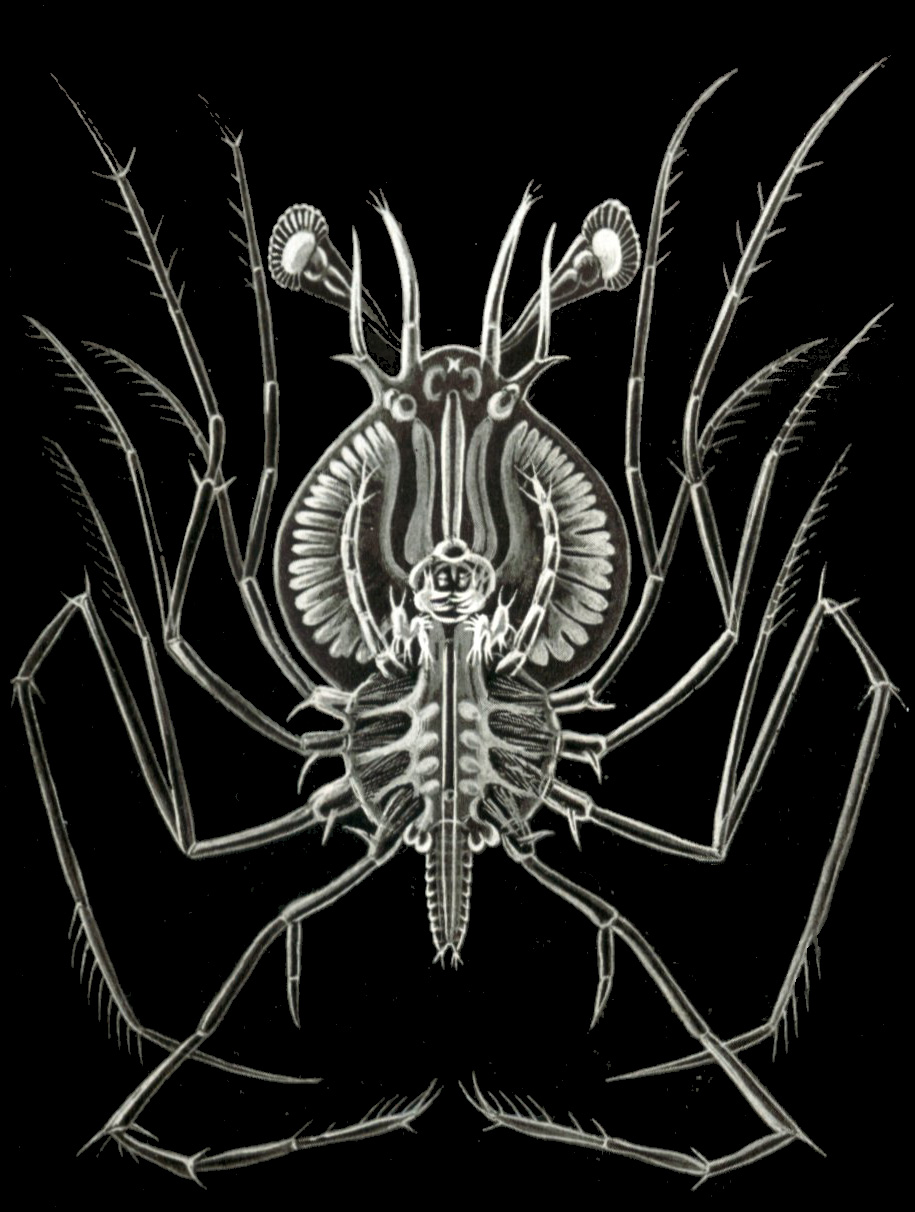
Phyllosoma larva of Palinurus elephas (drawing by Haeckel)

The phyllosoma is the larval stage of spiny and slipper lobster (Palinuridae and Scyllaridae), and represents one of the most significant characteristics that unify them into the taxon Achelata. Its body is remarkably thin, flat, and transparent, with long legs.

The phyllosoma larva of spiny lobsters has a long planktonic life before metamorphosing into the puerulus stage, which is the transitional stage from planktonic to a benthic existence. Despite the importance of larval survival to predict recruitment, not much is known about the biology of phyllosoma larvae. In many cases even natural diet is still unclear.

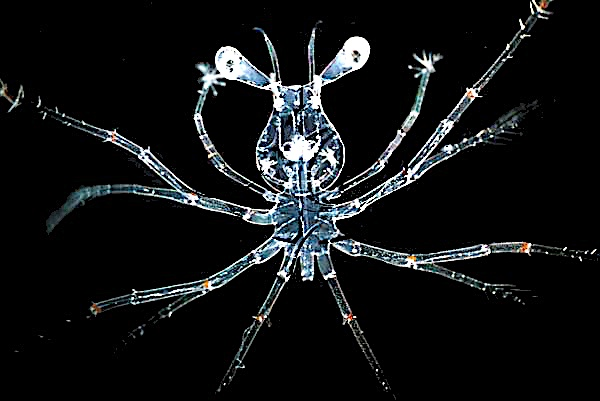
Phyllosoma larva (micrograph)

Even though adult morphology is well described, studies on the planktonic phyllosoma phase have been comparatively neglected given its long duration, which has made it difficult to rear them in the laboratory. Despite the relatively large size of these larvae and their immediate recognition in plankton sorting, important identification problems due to the lack of detailed and specific morphological descriptions have precluded specific determination in many plankton samples. Recent efforts to identify phyllosoma larvae using molecular techniques have provided further insight into the ecology and distribution.

== See also ==
- Crustacean larvae
