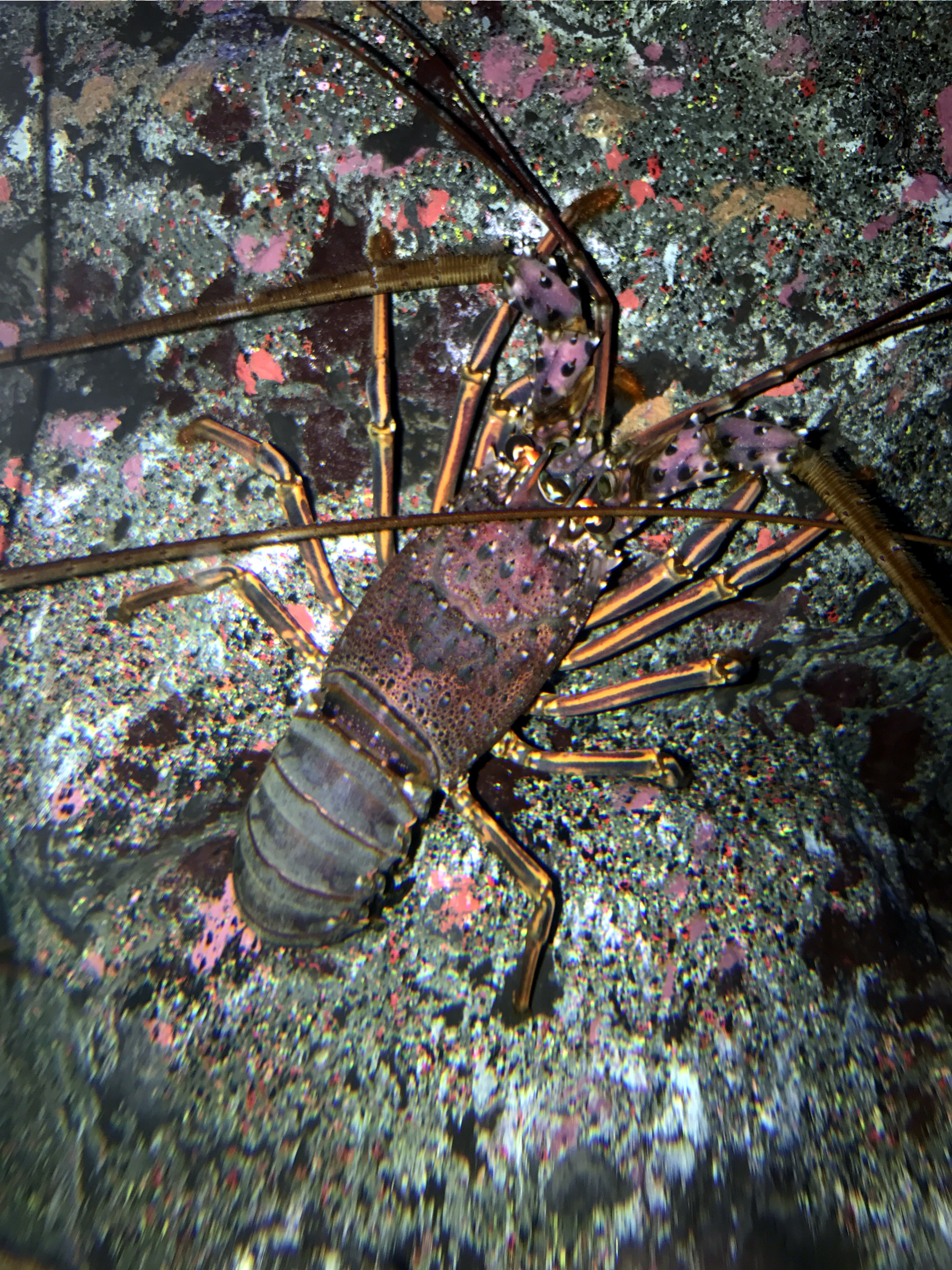

Conservation status
- Data Deficient (IUCN 3.1)

Scientific classification
- Kingdom: Animalia
- Phylum: Arthropoda
- Clade: Pancrustacea
- Class: Malacostraca
- Order: Decapoda
- Suborder: Pleocyemata
- Family: Palinuridae
- Genus: Panulirus
- Species: P. japonicus

Binomial name
- Panulirus japonicus (Von Siebold, 1824)

Synonyms
- Palinurus japonicus von Siebold, 1824

= Japanese spiny lobster =

Species of crustacean

The Japanese spiny lobster (イセエビ, ise-ebi; or 伊勢蝦/伊勢海老/伊勢蛯/鰝), Panulirus japonicus, is a member of the genus Panulirus of spiny lobsters. It grows up to 30 centimetres (12 in) long and lives in the Pacific Ocean around Japan, Taiwan, China, and Korea. P. japonicus is the subject of commercial lobster fishery in Japan. It is a popular item in high-class Japanese cuisine.
