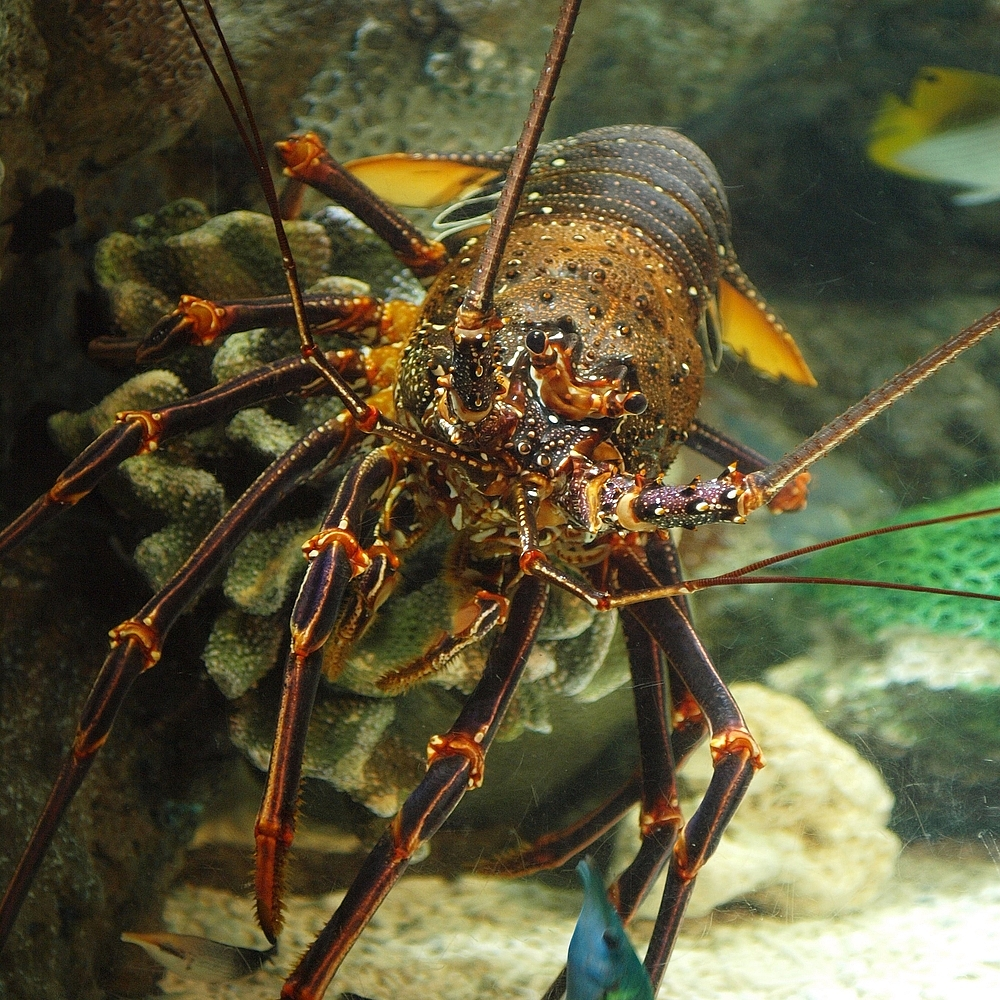

Conservation status
- Least Concern (IUCN 3.1)

Scientific classification
- Kingdom: Animalia
- Phylum: Arthropoda
- Class: Malacostraca
- Order: Decapoda
- Suborder: Pleocyemata
- Family: Palinuridae
- Genus: Panulirus
- Species: P. longipes

Binomial name
- Panulirus longipes (A. Milne-Edwards, 1868)

= Panulirus longipes =

Species of crustacean

Panulirus longipes, the longlegged spiny lobster, is a species of spiny lobster that lives on shallow rocky and coral reefs in the tropical Indo-Pacific region. The International Union for Conservation of Nature has assessed its conservation status as being of "least concern".

== Description ==
Panulirus longipes grows to a maximum length of about 30 cm (12 in), but a more normal adult size is 20 to 25 cm (8 to 10 in) with a carapace length of up to 10 cm (4 in). The general colour is dark brown or bluish-brown and there are numerous circular white spots on the abdomen and rather fewer spots on other parts of the body. The legs have pale longitudinal stripes and sometimes a single white spot near the tip.

== Distribution and habitat ==
Panulirus longipes is native to the tropical and subtropical Indo-Pacific region. Its range extends from Madagascar and the east coast of Africa to Malaysia, Japan, Taiwan, the Philippines, Indonesia, Papua New Guinea and northern Australia. It is found on rocky and coral reefs, usually at depths less than about 18 m (59 ft), but exceptionally as deep as 122 m (400 ft).

There are two subspecies; P. l. longipes is known from East Africa to Thailand, Taiwan, the Philippines and Indonesia, while P. l. bispinosus is known from Japan, Micronesia, Papua New Guinea, Vanuatu, Fiji, Tonga, the Cook Islands, New Caledonia and the east coast of Australia.

== Biology ==
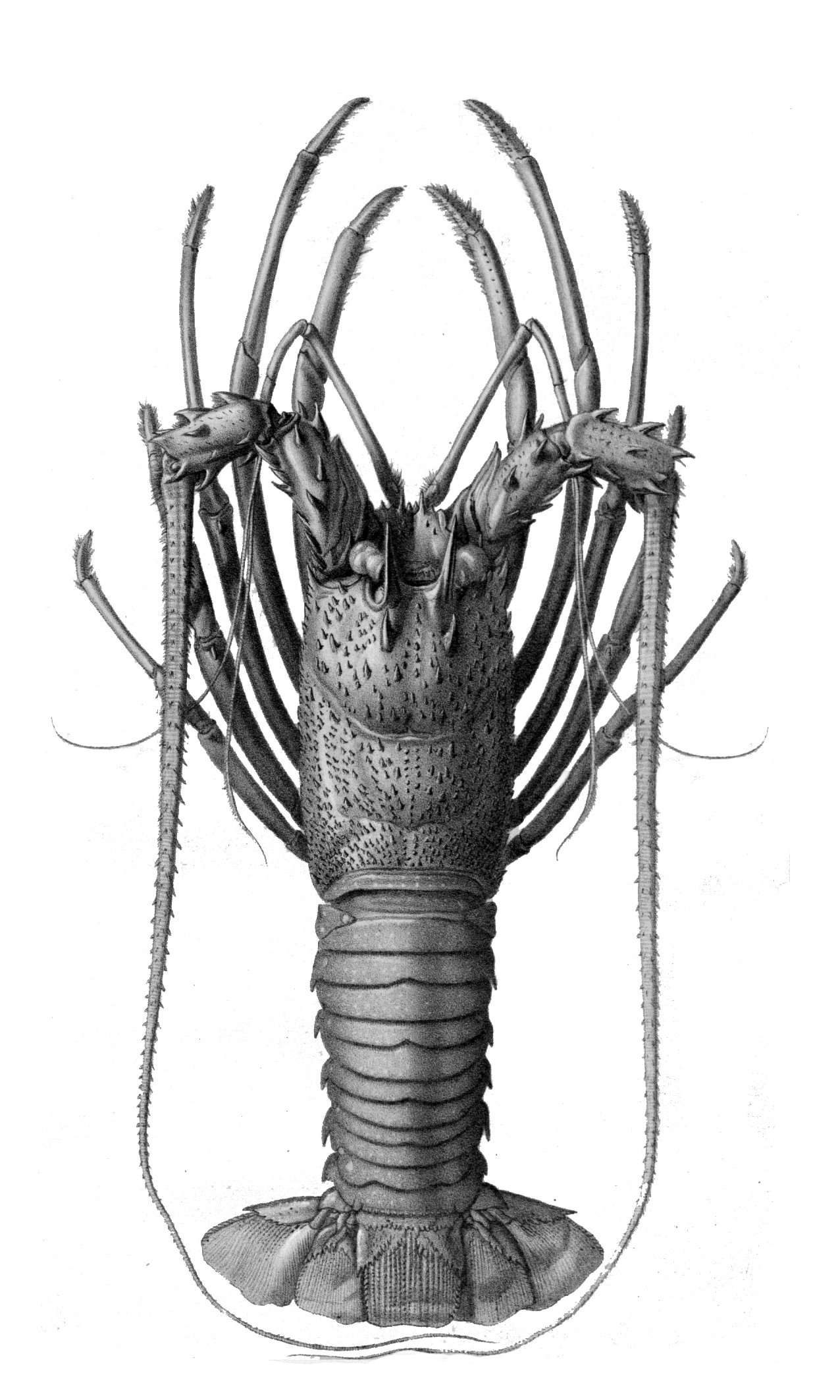
Panulirus longipes illustrated by Louveau in L. Guerin's Nouvelles Archives du Muséum d'Histoire Naturelle, 1868

Panulirus longipes is nocturnal and hides in rock crevices and under boulders during the day. It feeds on molluscs and other bottom-dwelling invertebrates and defends itself by producing audible sounds whose characteristics have been analysed by Meyer-Rochow & Penrose in 1977. Females carry a large clutch of small eggs tucked under their abdomen for several months. When the eggs hatch, the larvae are planktonic for about ten months before undergoing metamorphosis into puerulus larvae, which settle on the seabed. Juveniles are not gregarious at first and are generally found in shallower water than adults. They are slow-growing and reach a carapace length of about 2 cm (0.8 in) in eighteen months. The animals first breed at around five years of age.

== Status ==
This spiny lobster is caught throughout most of its range for human consumption. The fisheries are mostly small in scale with the methods used including lobster pots, spear-fishing, tangle-nets and traps. There are no population figures available but it is likely that it is being overfished in parts of its range. However, it has a very wide range and is common in much of that range, so the International Union for Conservation of Nature has listed its conservation status as being of "least concern".
