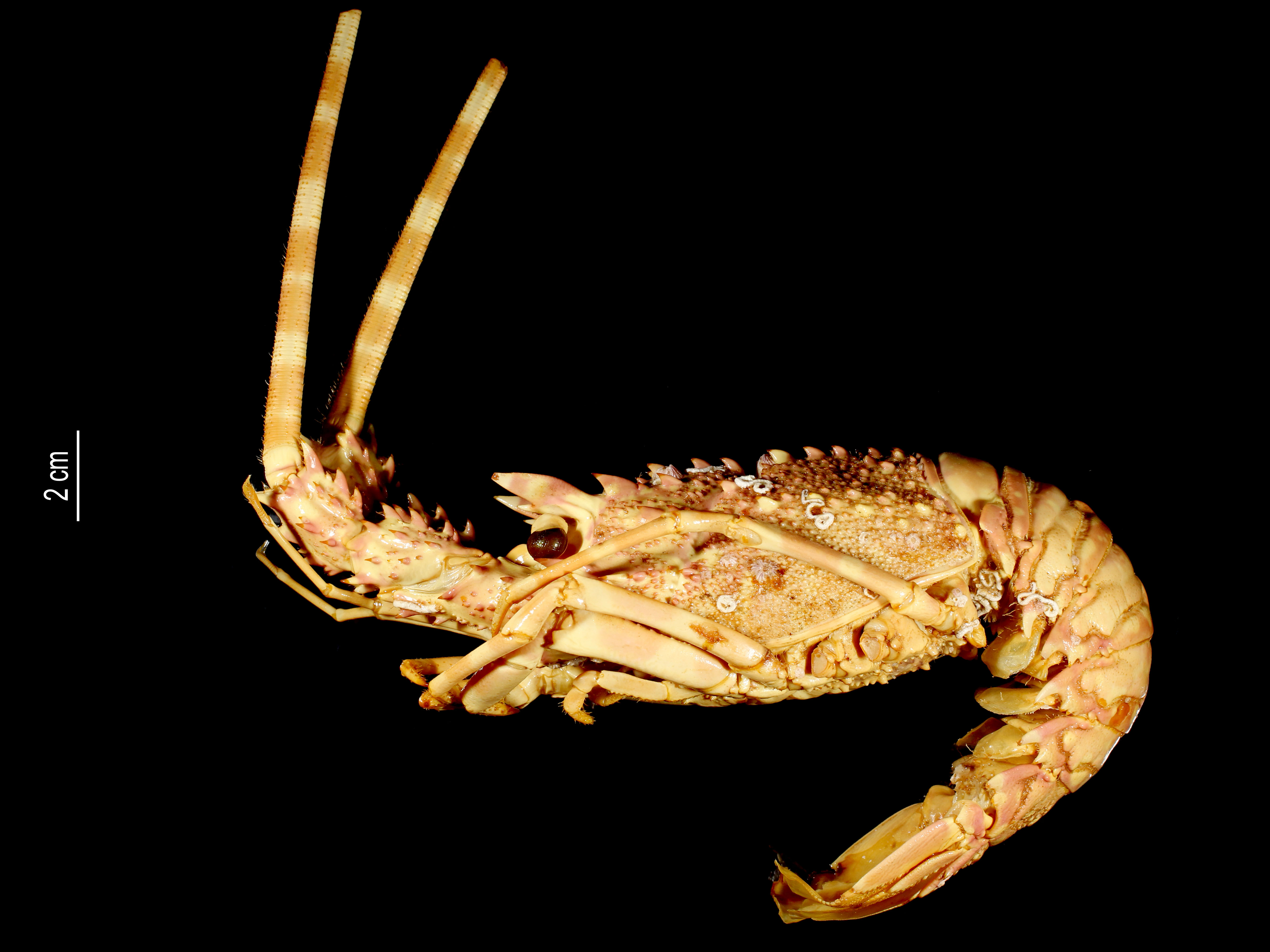

Conservation status
- Near Threatened (IUCN 3.1)

Scientific classification
- Kingdom: Animalia
- Phylum: Arthropoda
- Class: Malacostraca
- Order: Decapoda
- Suborder: Pleocyemata
- Family: Palinuridae
- Genus: Palinurus
- Species: P. charlestoni

Binomial name
- Palinurus charlestoni Forest & Postel, 1964

= Palinurus charlestoni =

Species of crustacean

Palinurus charlestoni is a species of spiny lobster which is endemic to the waters of Cape Verde. It grows to a total length of 50 cm (20 in) and can be distinguished from other Atlantic species in the genus by the pattern of horizontal bands on its legs. It was discovered by French fishermen in 1963, and has been the subject of small-scale fishery since. It is thought to be overexploited, and is listed as Near Threatened on the IUCN Red List.

== Description ==
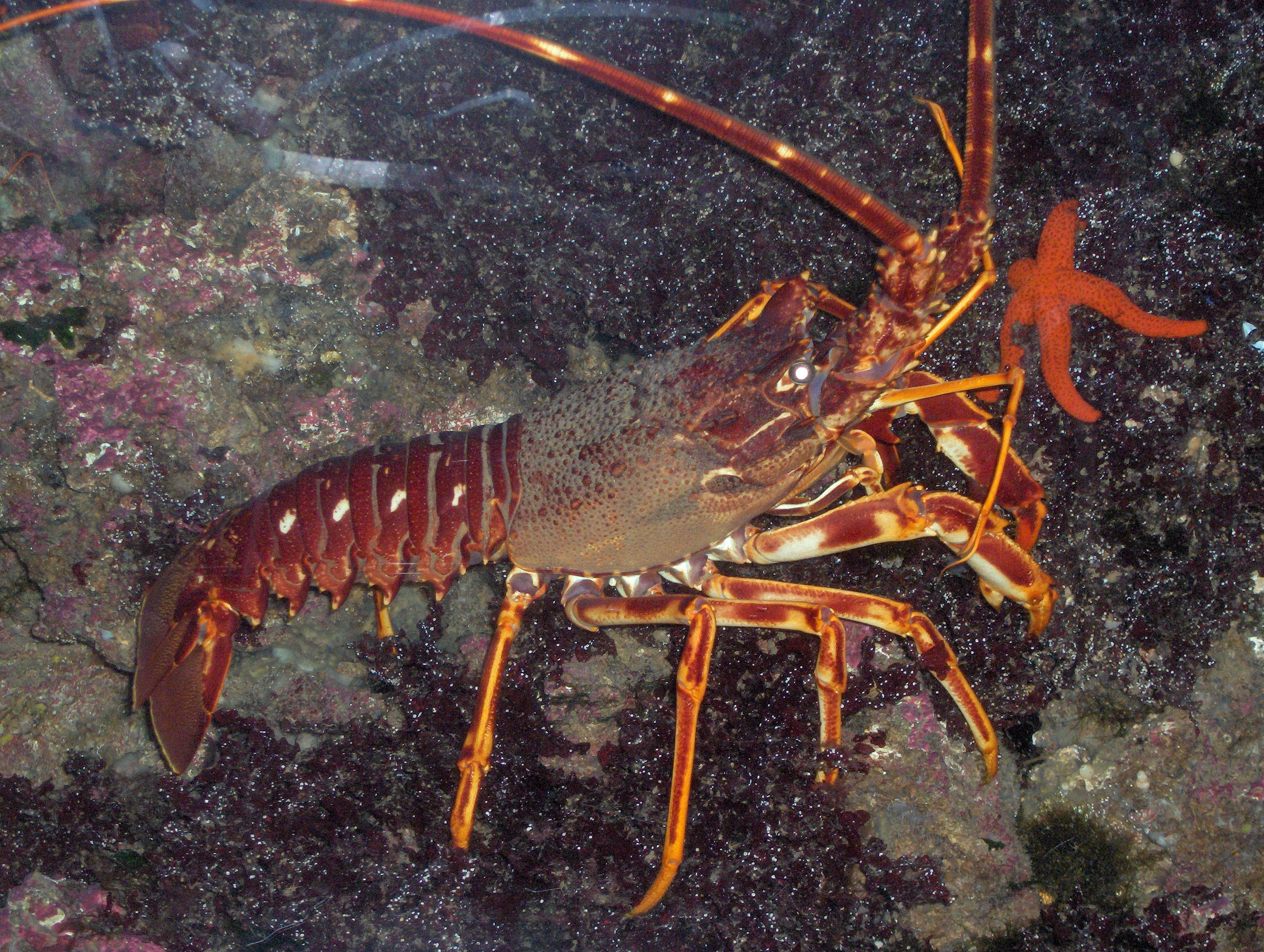
Palinurus elephas is a related species from the north-east Atlantic Ocean.

The total length of Palinurus charlestoni can reach 50 centimetres (20 in), with the average size around 40 cm (16 in). Like other spiny lobsters, it has five pairs of pereiopods (walking legs), but no chelae (claws).

In life, P. charlestoni is red to violet, but quite variable in colour. The carapace is red with white spots, while the abdomen is red with sharp white stripes on either side of the midline.

P. charlestoni can be distinguished from the other Atlantic species of Palinurus by overall colouration (being less brown than the other species), and more specifically by the patterns on the pereiopods; in P. mauritanicus, they are mottled and in P. elephas they are marked with longitudinal stripes, but in P. charlestoni, they are marked with narrow white bands alternating with wider red bands.

== Distribution and ecology ==
Palinurus charlestoni is endemic to the Cape Verde archipelago. It is found at depths of 50–400 m (160–1,310 ft), but with the greatest densities at depths of 100–250 m (330–820 ft). It prefers steep, rocky territory, where the water is at a temperature of 13–14 °C (55–57 °F).

== Life cycle ==
Palinurus charlestoni breeds from June onwards, peaking in the period August–November. The eggs are brooded on the female's pleopods for 4–5 months until hatching, which begins in November and peaks in December or January. From March to May, females have never been observed carrying eggs. The young animals grow through a series of moults, which have been observed in captivity in February and March. Females reach sexual maturity at a carapace length of around 90–110 millimetres (3.5–4.3 in). During its adult life, Palinurus charlestoni appears to undergo seasonal migrations, preferring waters at a depth of 100–200 m (330–660 ft) in summer, but 150–250 m (490–820 ft) in winter.

== Fishery and management ==
Palinurus charlestoni first became the subject of fisheries in 1963, when three French vessels that had previously fished for P. mauritanicus off Mauritania prospected the waters of the Cape Verde islands. Their catch provided the type specimens for the species description. In 1966, the Portuguese government extended their territorial waters to 12 nautical miles (22 km; 14 mi) offshore, preventing the French boats from fishing those waters. In 1975, Cape Verde declared independence from Portugal, although Portuguese vessels continued to fish there.

All catches of P. charlestoni are made with lobster traps, which have evolved in Cape Verde into a distinct local design. Traditional lobster traps are barrel-shaped with a wooden frame, and are 0.7 m (2 ft 4 in) long and 0.6 m (2 ft 0 in) high. The Cape Verdian traps are half-cylindrical with a metal frame covered in wire netting, and are 1.5–2.0 m (4 ft 11 in – 6 ft 7 in) long, 1.15–1.50 m (3 ft 9 in – 4 ft 11 in) wide and 0.5 m (1 ft 8 in) high. Mackerel and horse mackerel are used to bait the traps, which are then left overnight.

The size of the historical catch is not known in detail; one estimate for 1976 was 50 t, around 20–60 t was caught annually between 1982 and 1990, and production probably peaked in 1991/92, when the catch was around 85 t. Since then, the catch has generally shrunk, dropping to 14 t in 1996/97, or 35 t in 1998/99.

P. charlestoni is protected by a number of laws in Cape Verde. A limited number of licences are granted (only five in 2006), and a minimum landing size of 24 centimetres (9.4 in) is applied. A ban on landing egg-bearing females was repealed, and the closed season extended from three to six months (July to November). An estimate of the maximum sustainable yield (MSY) of P. charlestoni using Fox's surplus production model suggested that the species is being overexploited; it found the MSY to be around 40 t, which could be caught using only 60% of the effort expended on the fishery in 1999. Because of the likely overexploitation, and the species' limited range, it is listed as Near Threatened on the IUCN Red List.

== Taxonomy ==
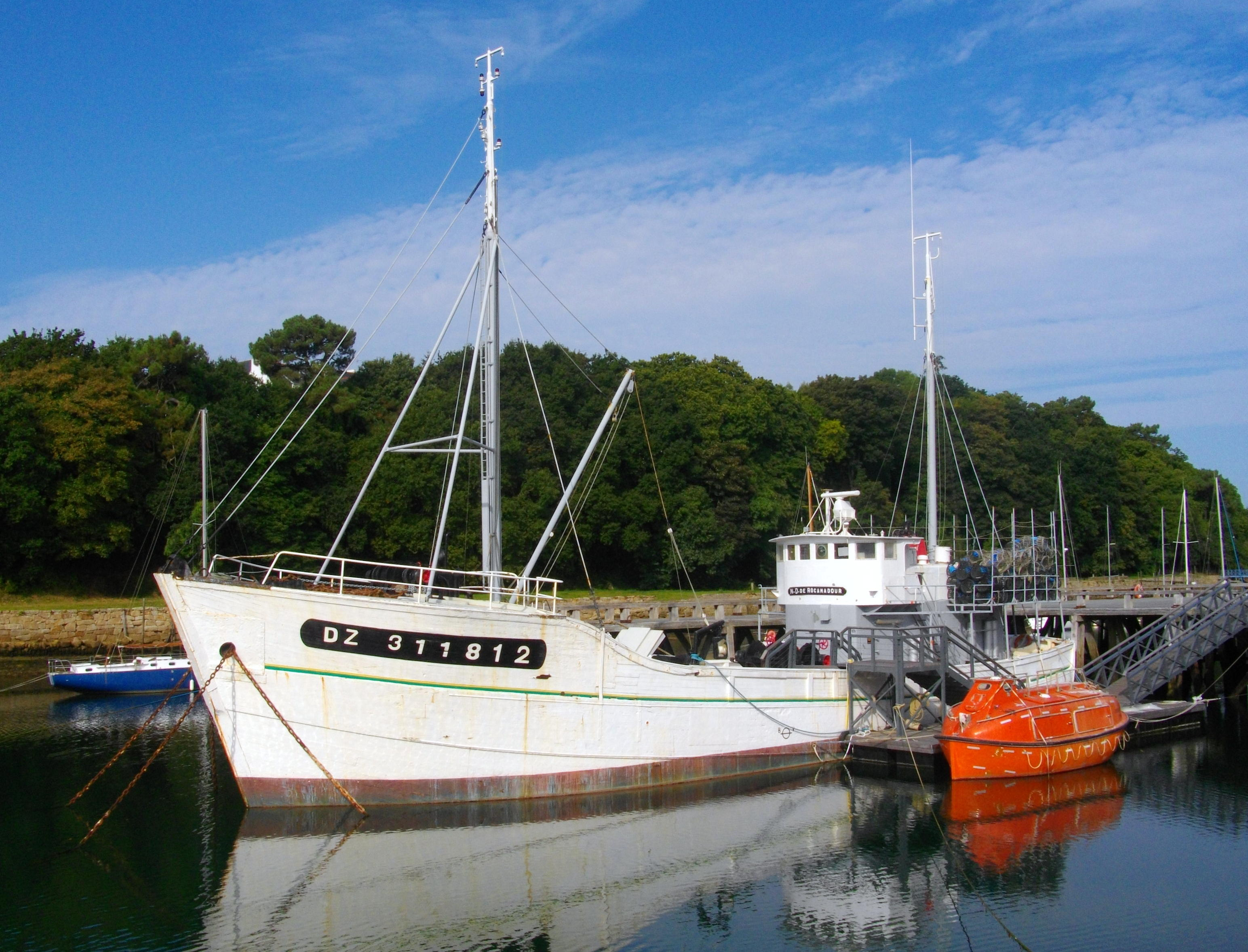
The Notre-Dame de Rocamadour, part of the original French fishing fleet that discovered P. charlestoni

Palinurus charlestoni was first described by Jacques Forest and E. Postel in 1964. The first specimens to be examined scientifically had been collected in late 1963 by the French lobster boat Charleston, operating out of Camaret-sur-Mer, and the specific epithet charlestoni commemorates that boat. Further specimens were obtained from other Camaret lobster boats, the Notre-Dame de Rocamadour and the Folgor, and the species was described in the Bulletin du Muséum National d'Histoire Naturelle.

== Evolution ==
P. charlestoni is one of six extant species in the genus Palinurus. According to analyses of the cytochrome oxidase gene, its nearest relatives are not Palinurus mauritanicus, which lives 600 kilometres (370 mi) to the east, off the coast of West Africa, or Palinurus elephas of the north-eastern Atlantic Ocean, but the species from the Indian Ocean – P. barbarae, P. gilchristi and P. delagoae. The genus is thought to have evolved in the Indian Ocean; from there, P. charlestoni is thought to have migrated clockwise round Africa, past the Cape of Good Hope, while its neighbour P. mauritanicus migrated anticlockwise, through the Tethys Sea.
