= Chocolate in savory cooking =

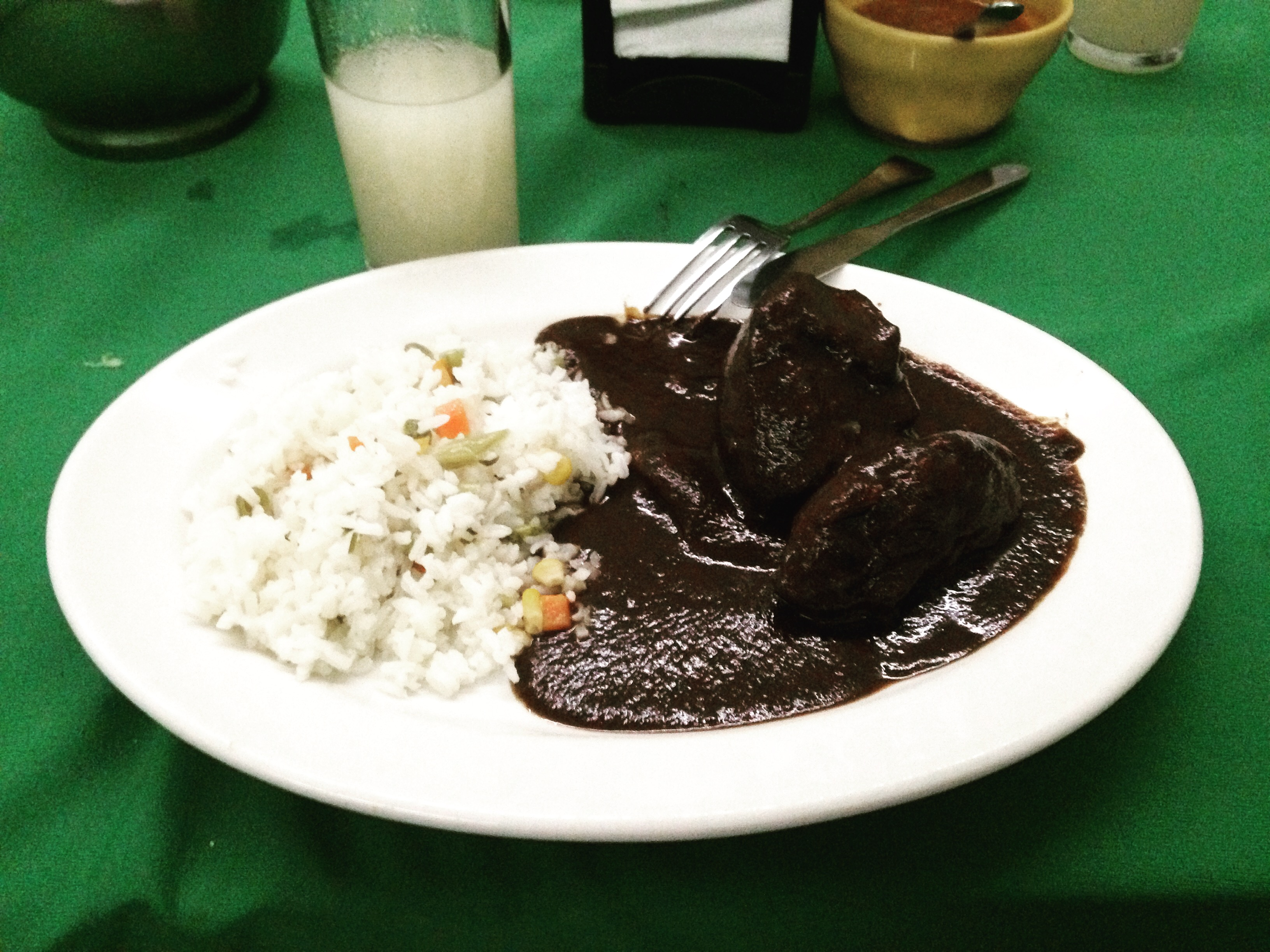
Mole can include chocolate. Above, a black mole (mole negro).

Despite being more common in sweet foods, chocolate has been used as an ingredient in savory cooking for over a thousand years.

Historically in the Americas, chocolate has been inconsistently included in savory cooking; it was used by the Mayans as early as 400 CE and essentially prohibited by the Aztecs. Throughout the 17th and 18th centuries, chocolate featured extensively in European cuisine, particularly in Northern Italy. Preparations included lasagna, fried liver and ragout dishes.

Today, although savory chocolate is most famously used in the Mexican sauce mole, it is still an ingredient in some European dishes. It is generally added in small quantities, to emulsify, improve texture, to add complexity, and to provide balance to acidic flavors. Some modern chefs have used chocolate in savory dishes, notably Heston Blumenthal in the early 2000s.

== History ==
Macreuse en ragout au chocolat

Having properly plucked and cleaned your wigeon, empty and clean it; blanch it on the fire and then pot it, seasoning it with salt, pepper, bay, and a bundle of herbs. Make a little chocolate to toss it in. Meanwhile, prepare a ragout with the liver, mushrooms, morels, meadow mushrooms, truffles, a quarter of a pound of chestnuts, and your wigeon now cooked and laid out on a platter. Serve your ragout over the wigeon, and garnish it as you like.

— François Massialot, Le cuisinier roïal et bourgeois (1691)

Inscriptions on a Petén bowl from 400 CE contain a reference to chocolate, referring either to a Mayan mole or a chocolate-flavored tamale. If the former, as of 2024 this would constitute the first known reference to mole. Although the dish mole poblano is often credited to the Aztecs, they did not use chocolate to flavor cooking; historians Michael and Sophie Coe analogize such use to Christians making coq au vin using sacramental wine. In a popular legend, the use of chocolate in mole is attributed to Mexican nuns in late 17th century Puebla. Culinary historian Maricel Presilla credits the Central American tradition of thickened chocolate drinks with influencing this addition.

Chocolate was considered a pleasant and unremarkable addition to European cuisine as of the mid-17th century. The first appearance in a French recipe is 1691, where it was used in a chocolate ragout served with wigeon. In the recipe, it was not explained how chocolate was made. During the 17th century, chocolate was a common ingredient in European cooking, particularly in Northern Italy. 18th-century Italian recipes contain chocolate as an ingredient in recipes for pappardelle, fried liver, black polenta and a 1786 manuscript from Macerata records a lasagna sauce containing chocolate, alongside anchovies, walnuts and almonds.Such was its popularity in Italy, that overuse was gentled mocked in a 1736 poem titled "Il Cioccolato." Chocolate featured in meat pies since the 17th century in Sicily. One recipe for a chocolate meat pie was included in Pellegrino Artusi's 1891 cookbook Science in the Kitchen under the name Torta alla Milanese (Milanese Pie), alongside flavours such as raisins and pine nuts.

Food writer Claudia Roden identifies the introduction of chocolate to Catalonia as taking place in the 19th century as Spaniards returned from Mexico. As it entered the cuisine, it was regarded as a novelty.

== Modern use ==
While chocolate is often understood as only being appropriate for sweet applications, chocolate is used as an ingredient in several popular recipes and by modern chefs. Chocolate is generally used in small quantities to emulsify, or, as described by Auguste Escoffier, to give dishes "some silkiness", and for the acidity it balances. On the use of little chocolate, for one dish Roden writes that the amount should be "so small that you hardly detect it", describing the flavour it contributes as "mysterious". In justifying its use, chefs may argue cocoa beans, as seeds, should be understood in the same manner as spices like caraway or cardamom.

=== Americas ===
The best known use of chocolate in savory cooking today occurs in mole, where a small amount is added as the sauce fries at the end of cooking. The small quantity is an important aspect to mole aficionados and recipe writers, who often emphasize the small amount to counter characterizations of mole as a chocolate sauce. Moles are a broad ranges of sauces, and chocolate is generally restricted to the red or black varieties. Chocolate is especially prevalent in mole preparations for celebrations, such as baptisms and holidays. Although the chocolate is sometimes intensively prepared by grinding cocoa beans on metate, often in Mexico today cacao nibs or Mexican chocolate is purchased from supermarkets and used. This Mexican chocolate contains sugar, cinnamon and sometimes ground almonds and is mass-produced as well as made artisanally.

Another sauce popular in Central America, pipián, does not usually contain chocolate except in a variety popular in Guatemala that originated in Sololá. The version tastes very similar to mole.

In the United States, a small amount of unsweetened chocolate is added by some cooks to chili con carne to add "richness, deeper flavor, and umami." A spice mix for this purpose made of cocoa, paprika and chipotle is sold in spice shops in the country. (Note: These spice mixes are also used for sweet purposes, integrated into brownies and cakes.) In Mexican cooking, chocolate and cocoa powder are treated as a spice. Chocolate is used to soften sharp flavors, such as the acidity of tomatoes, and to add complexity to dishes.

=== Europe ===
Chocolate is used by some Italian cooks: stirred into stews and braises to flavor and thicken, added to coq au vin, and combined with wine or vinegar as it is cooked down to make the sweet-and-sour sauce agrodolce. Pasta is also at times eaten with chocolate, serving as a filling in ravioli, an ingredient in sauces, and in some occasions integrated into pasta doughs, served with sauces based on cheese or meat. In Tuscany, chocolate is strongly associated with venison and wild boar.

Like in Italy, Spanish cooks sometimes add dark chocolate to their coq au vin. Savory applications of chocolate are particularly prominent in Spain within Catalonian cuisine, featured in versions of dishes such as lobster hotpot (caldereta de langosta) and chicken and prawn stew (pollo con langostinos). Other regions have their own dishes: in some, breadcrumbs are combined with chocolate to make dishes of migas. In Navarre in Spain's north, chocolate is eaten with oxtail in estofado de toro con chocolate, and in the region's mountain villages some cooks add chocolate when making their wine sauces, serving it with game such as hare or quail. Wine sauces are a frequent site for chocolate across western cooking; one such sauce in France being grand veneur.

=== Chefs ===
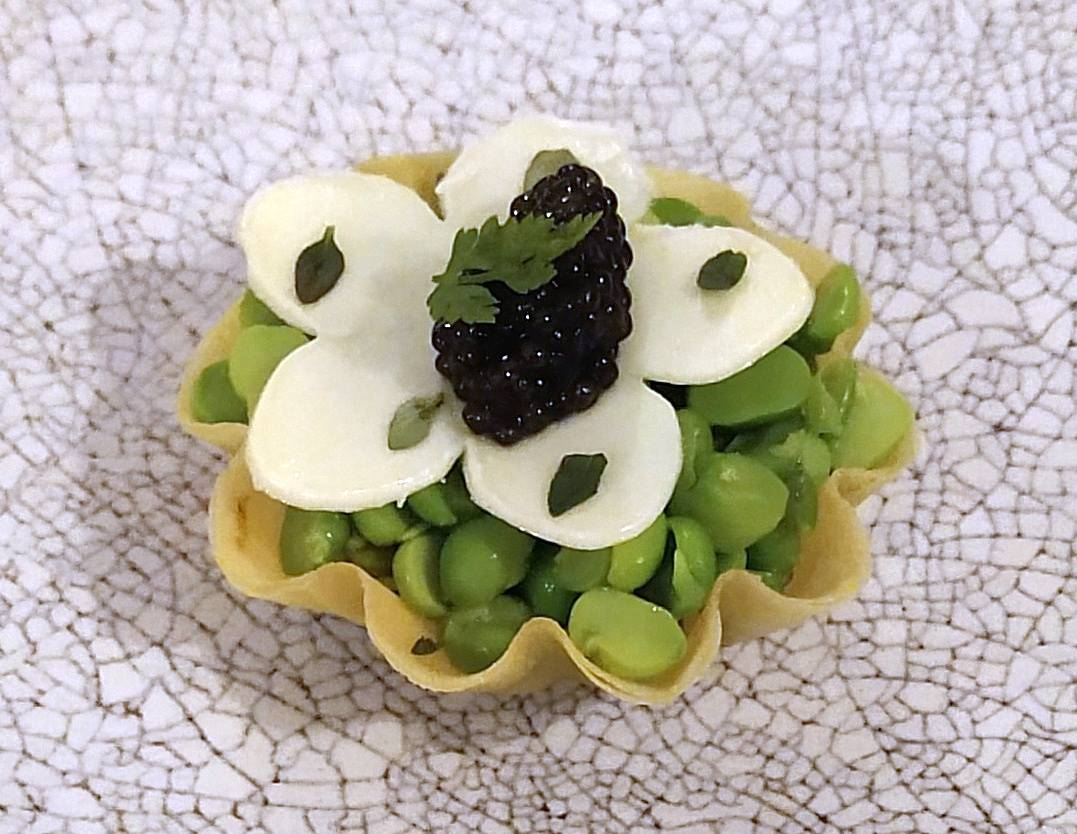
A pea tart topped with caviar and white chocolate

Modern chefs have used chocolate in forms including white and dark chocolate, as well as cacao nibs. For chefs, white chocolate has been used to make sauces glossy and creamy, counterbalancing saltiness and bring "richness" to vegetarian dishes. Dark chocolate is often paired with winter vegetables such as parsnips and wild mushrooms.

In the 2000s, it became common for chefs such as Heston Blumenthal to recommend pairing foods with similar flavour molecules according to the theory of food pairing. The ingredients they combined included white chocolate and caviar, as well as chocolate with garlic and coffee, based on the belief that the compounds these foods shared would produce desirable flavours. Blumenthal had turned away from this school of thought by 2010, calling it a product of his younger self's "bumptious enthusiasm" and saying that the number of flavour molecules in food made such an approach too "complex" to predict the results of.

== See also ==
- Melanzane al cioccolato (lit. 'chocolate eggplants')
- Types of chocolate

== Sources ==
- Bau, Frédéric (2008). Chocolate Fusion: Chocolate in Cuisine (2nd English ed.). Montagud Editores. ISBN 978-84-7212-117-1.
- Castle, Sheri (November 2, 2023). "Chocolate In Chili Is The Key To Extra Flavor And Richness". Southern Living. Archived from the original on May 14, 2024.
- Coe, Sophie D.; Coe, Michael D. (2013). The True History of Chocolate (3rd ed.). London: Thames & Hudson. ISBN 978-0-500-77093-1. OCLC 1085907808.
- Gerrie, David (October 31, 2013). "I should cocoa: Chefs are giving chocolate a starring role in savoury dishes". The Independent.
- Houston, Stephen (August 6, 2024). "A Good Hot Meal—Notes to a Culinary History". Maya Decipherment.
- Laiskonis, Michael (January 13, 2009). "Chocolate's Savory Side". Gourmet.
- Long-Solís, Janet; Vargas, Luis Alberto (2005). Food Culture in Mexico. Food Culture around the World. Connecticut: Greenwood Publishing Group. ISBN 0-313-32431-X.
- Medina, F Xavier (2005). Food culture in Spain. Food culture around the world. Connecticut: Greenwood Publishing Group. ISBN 0-313-32819-6.
- Presilla, Maricel E. (2012). Gran Cocina Latina: The Food of Latin America. New York & London: W. W. Norton & Company. ISBN 978-0-393-05069-1.
- Quinn, Sue (October 4, 2019). "Go ahead, have chocolate for dinner: Why you should cook with it, and not just dessert". The Washington Post.
- Roden, Claudia (2012). The Food of Spain: A Celebration. London: Michael Joseph. ISBN 978-0-718-15719-7.
- Rothman, Jordana (July 2, 2014). "White Chocolate Goes Savory: How Chefs Are Redeeming the Scorned Sweet". Bon Appétit.
- Sampeck, Kathryn (April 2019). "Early Modern Landscapes of Chocolate: The Case of Tacuscalco". In DeCorse, Christopher R (ed.). Power, Political Economy, and Historical Landscapes of the Modern World: Interdisciplinary Perspectives. SUNY Press. ISBN 9781438473437.
- Segan, Francine (2009). "Chocolate for Dinner, An Italian Tradition". Francine Segan: Food Historian. Tribune Media Syndicates.
- Segan, Francine (October 31, 2018). "Chocolate's Italian History". Italy Magazine. Archived from the original on November 4, 2024.
- Segnit, Niki (2010). The Flavour Thesaurus. London, England: Bloomsbury Publishing. ISBN 9780747599777.
- Spence, Charles; Wang, Qian Janice; Youssef, Jozef (2017). "Pairing flavours and the temporal order of tasting". Flavour. 6 (4) 4. doi:10.1186/s13411-017-0053-0.
- Tebben, Maryann (2014). Sauces: A Global History. London: Reaktion Books. ISBN 978-1-78023-351-2.
- Wallace, Hannah (February 7, 2013). "How to Use Chocolate in Savory Dishes". Bon Appétit.
