= Selbie =

Selbie is a surname. Notable people with the surname include:

- Colin M. Selbie (1889–1916), Scottish zoologist
- Duncan Selbie (born 1962 or 1963), British government official
- Evelyn Selbie (1871–1950), American actress
