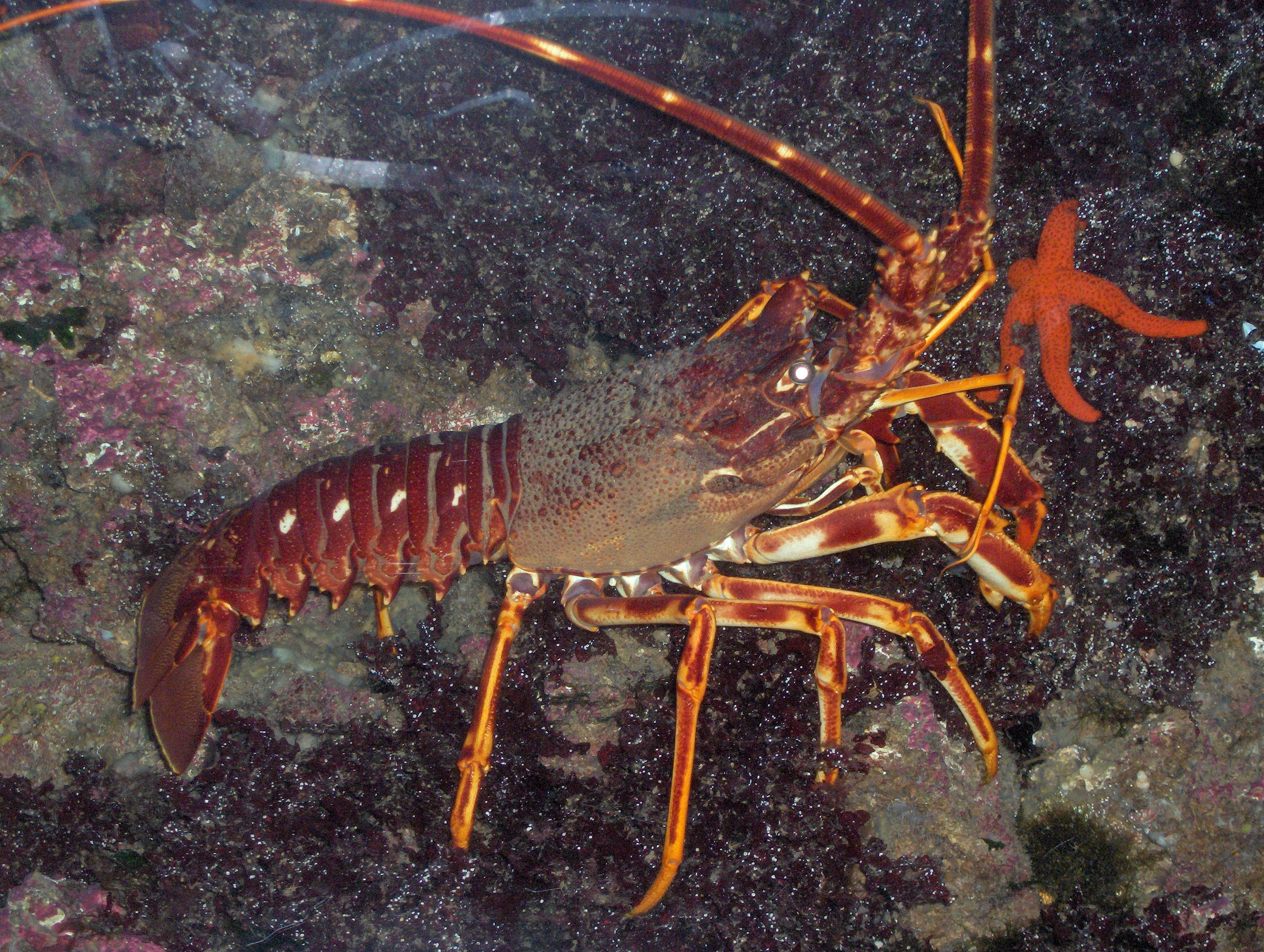
- Palinurus elephas

Scientific classification
- Kingdom: Animalia
- Phylum: Arthropoda
- Clade: Pancrustacea
- Class: Malacostraca
- Order: Decapoda
- Suborder: Pleocyemata
- Family: Palinuridae
- Genus: Palinurus; Weber, 1795

Type species
- Astacus elephas Fabricius, 1787

Species
- See text

= Palinurus (crustacean) =

Palinurus Temporal range: Albian–Recent

Genus of crustaceans

Palinurus is a genus of spiny lobsters in the family Palinuridae, native to the eastern Atlantic Ocean, Mediterranean Sea and western Indian Ocean. A 110-million-year-old fossil, recognisable as a member of the genus Palinurus, was discovered in a quarry in El Espinal in Mexico's Chiapas state in 1995 and named P. palaciosi.

== Species ==
This is a complete list of extant species:

Image	Scientific name	Common name	Distribution
	Palinurus barbarae Groeneveld, Griffiths & van Dalsen, 2006		south of Madagascar
	Palinurus charlestoni Forest & Postel, 1964	Cape Verde spiny lobster	Cape Verde
	Palinurus delagoae Barnard, 1926	Natal spiny lobster	
	Palinurus elephas (Fabricius, 1787)	common spiny lobster	eastern Atlantic Ocean, from southern Norway to Morocco and the Azores, and in the Mediterranean Sea
	Palinurus gilchristi Stebbing, 1900	southern spiny lobster	South Africa and Madagascar.
	Palinurus mauritanicus Gruvel, 1911	pink spiny lobster	eastern Atlantic Ocean and the western Mediterranean Sea.
