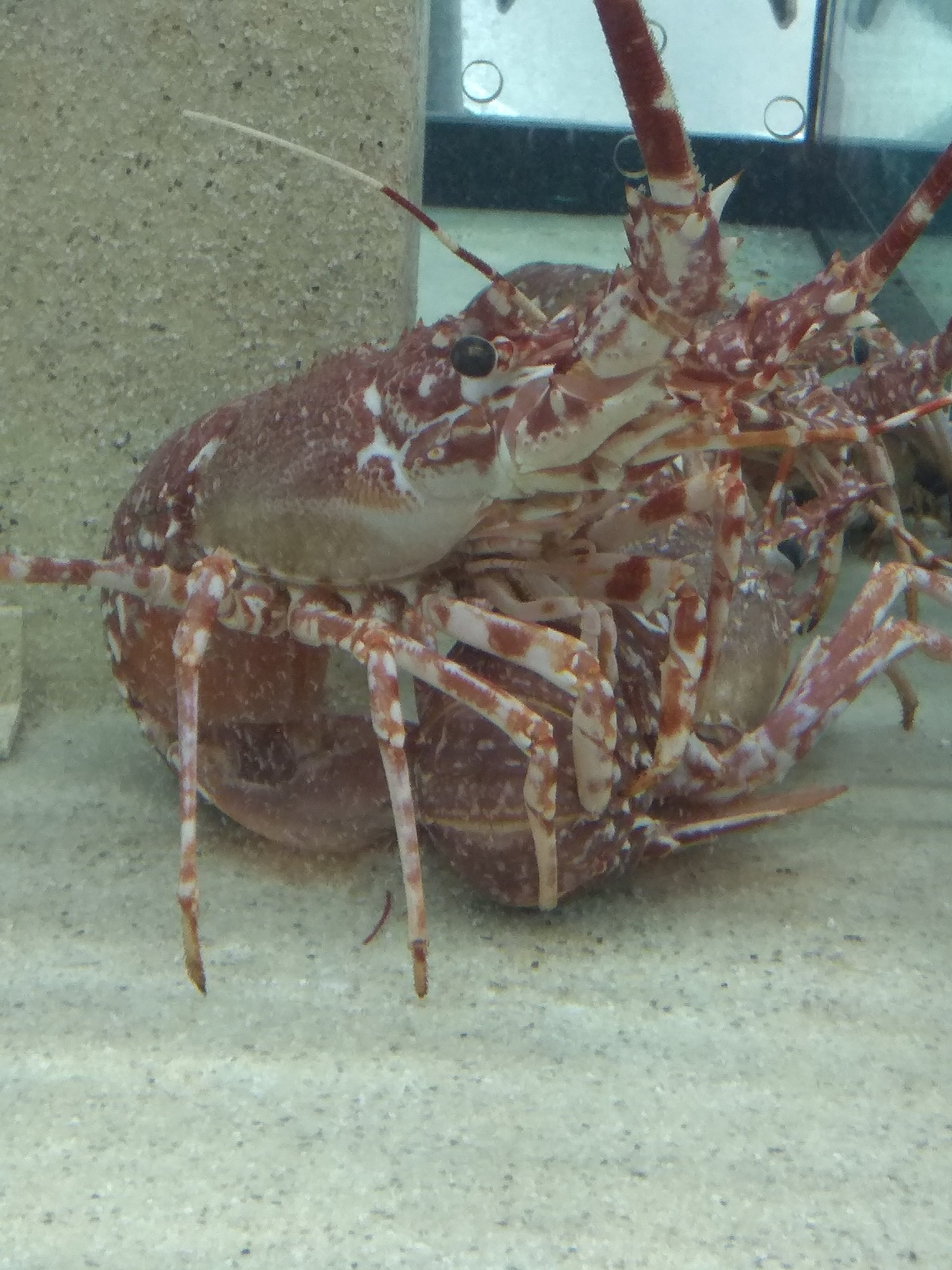

Conservation status
- Least Concern (IUCN 3.1)

Scientific classification
- Kingdom: Animalia
- Phylum: Arthropoda
- Class: Malacostraca
- Order: Decapoda
- Suborder: Pleocyemata
- Family: Palinuridae
- Genus: Palinurus
- Species: P. mauritanicus

Binomial name
- Palinurus mauritanicus Gruvel, 1911

Synonyms
- Palinurus vulgaris mauritanicus Gruvel, 1911 (basionym); Palinurus thomsoni Selbie, 1914

= Palinurus mauritanicus =

Species of crustacean

Palinurus mauritanicus (common name: pink spiny lobster) is a species of spiny lobster. It is found in deep waters in the eastern Atlantic Ocean and the western Mediterranean Sea.

== Description ==
The pink spiny lobster differs from Palinurus elephas, by its first pair of pereiopods (walking legs) that are as slender as its other pereiopods. The carapace shows two conspicuous, longitudinal rows of forward-directed spines. The peduncle, the base segment of the antenna, is particularly stout.

The pink spiny lobster may attain an age of at least 21 years.

== Distribution and habitat ==
It is distributed from south-western Ireland southwards throughout the western Mediterranean Sea (as far east as to Sicily, but not in the Adriatic Sea) and along the West African coast to Senegal. Palinurus mauritanicus and Palinurus elephas, are the only species of the family Palinuridae that occur both in the northeastern Atlantic Ocean and the Mediterranean Sea.

It is found on muddy or rocky bottoms at the edge of the continental shelf, but, off Europe in waters deeper than 200 m. Its greatest numbers occur at depths of between 200 and 400 metres (660 and 1,310 ft). The males seem more abundant at depths above 250 m while females and juveniles are found at greater depths.

== Diet ==
Palinurus mauritanicus lives as a scavenger from dead fish, but also hunts live molluscs, other crustaceans, polychaetes and echinoderms.

== Reproduction ==
The breeding season is between late summer and autumn, shortly after moulting. Females may carry up to 60,000 eggs. The study of larval ecology is scant. The hatching of the larvae happens after about three months as planktonic larvae (phyllosoma larvae). These larvae can be distinguished from other palinurid larvae by their pereiopods 4 and 5 being already present as small buds and by the long, non-setose exopod on pereiopod 3.

== Uses ==
Palinurus mauritanicus has been less the preferred target of lobster fisheries because of its relative scarcity, due to its deeper distribution. Its main fishing range is in the eastern central Atlantic off Mauritania. Its high unit value has led to depletion in the eastern central Atlantic.
