= Melanzane al cioccolato =

Italian dessert

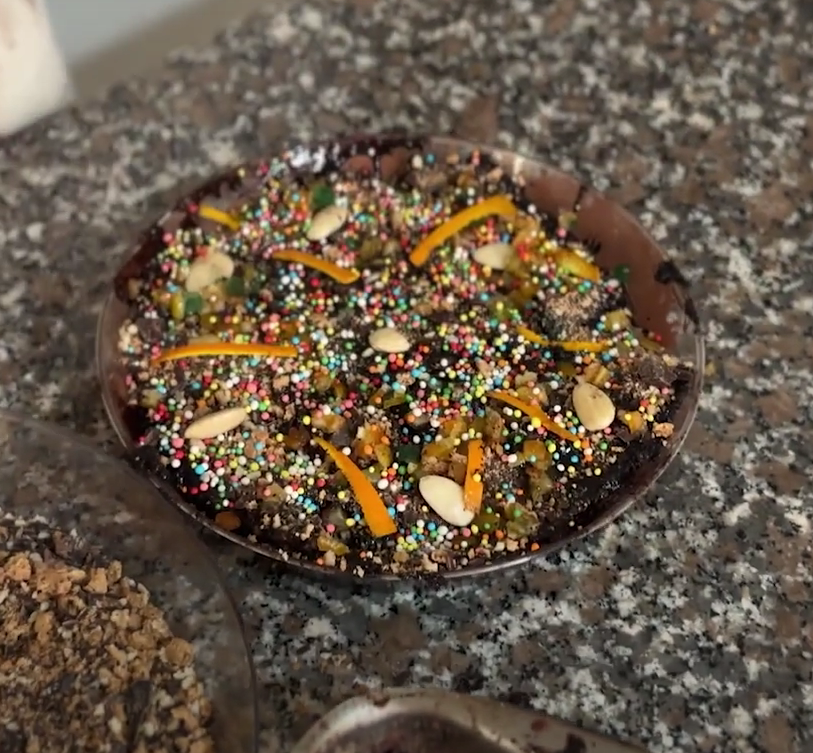
Melanzane al cioccolato with various toppings, including crushed amaretti di Saronno, almonds, sprinkles, and candied fruit

Melanzane al cioccolato (lit. 'chocolate eggplants') is a dessert made with fried eggplants and chocolate. The dish is popular along the Amalfi Coast, but is almost completely unknown elsewhere.

== Origins ==
The dish's origins are unclear. A legend recounts that during the Middle Ages, monks in a monastery in the mountains of Tramonti, Campania, produced a syrupy black liqueur known as Concerto d'Erbe. (Note: The liqueur continues to be made; a modern recipe has flavors of assorted herbs, spices and roots, coffee and a barley-based sugar syrup.) At some point, the prior created a new dish as he began dipping fried eggplant in the liqueur. Later in nearby Maiori, townspeople adapted this dish, substituting the liqueur with melted chocolate, creating melanzane al cioccolato.

Arthur Schwartz, writing in Naples at Table, does not rule out that this origin is historical, and dates the dish to no earlier than the mid-16th century when chocolate was introduced to Europe. While this legend suggests a long history, some travel guides and chefs consider it a novelty dish and a product of modern cooking.

== Preparations ==
Numerous distinct versions exist across the region. In a basic preparation, eggplant slices are coated in flour and fried, before being dredged in eggs and flour for a second fry. The dish is constructed by layering the eggplant slices with chocolate and fillings such as pine nuts, candied fruits (particularly citron), raisins, and almond pieces. It is typically served chilled or at room temperature.

In some modern preparations, a lighter dessert is made by baking, boiling, poaching or grilling the eggplant. Alternative fillings include ricotta or sponge cake, and Jordan almonds have been used as a topping. Because the dish takes a long time to prepare, melanzane al cioccolato is almost always homemade and rarely sold commercially.

A preparation of melanzane al cioccolato

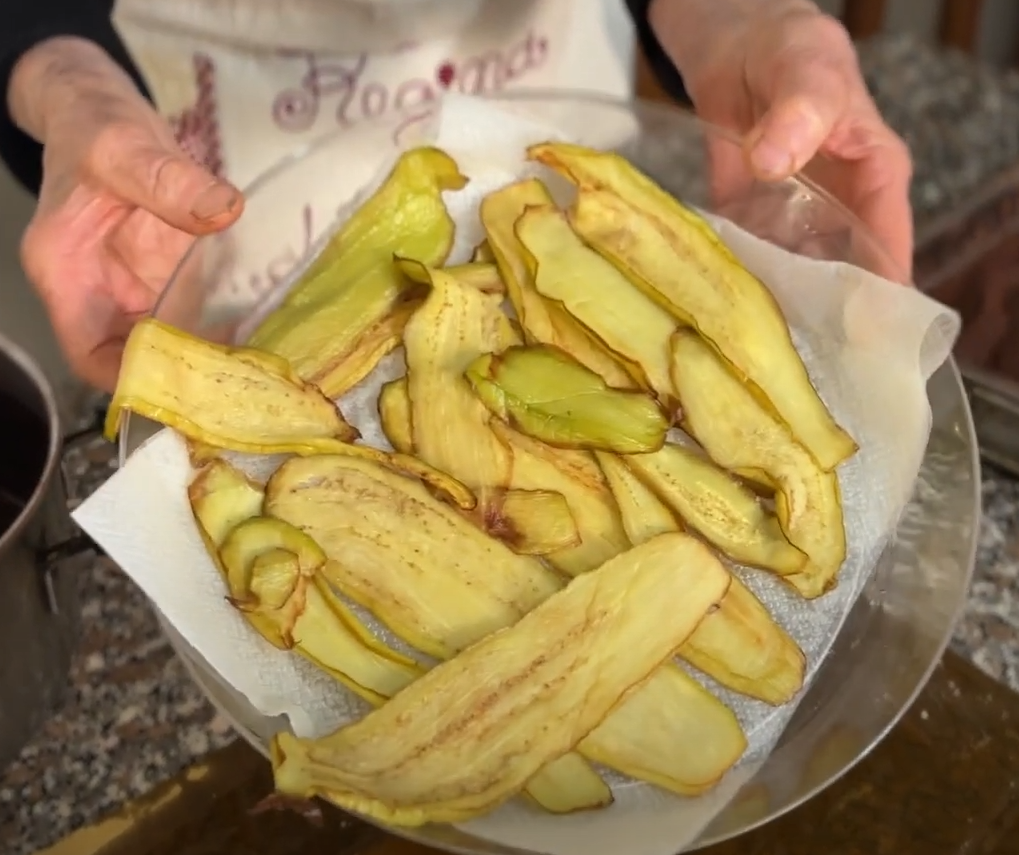
Slices of eggplant are fried

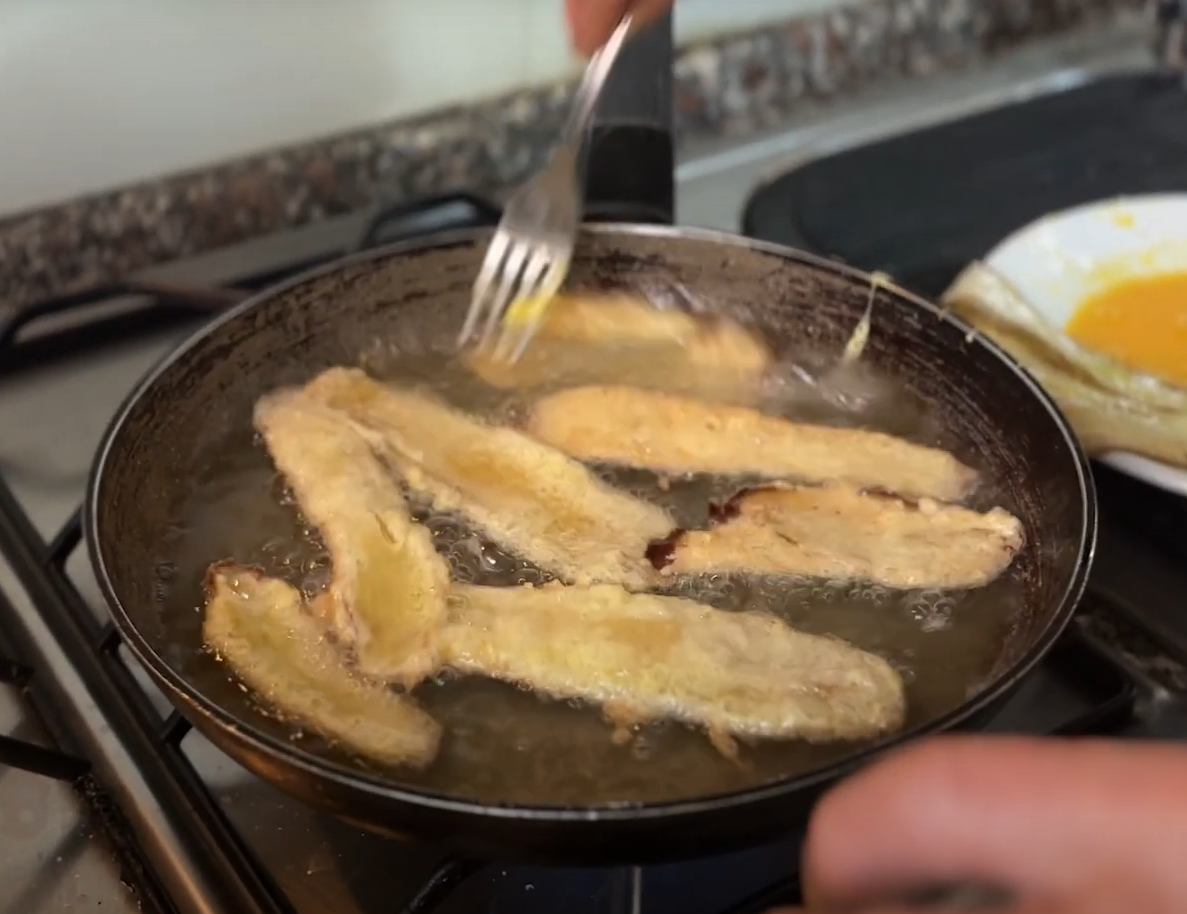
They are dredged in egg and flour and fried again

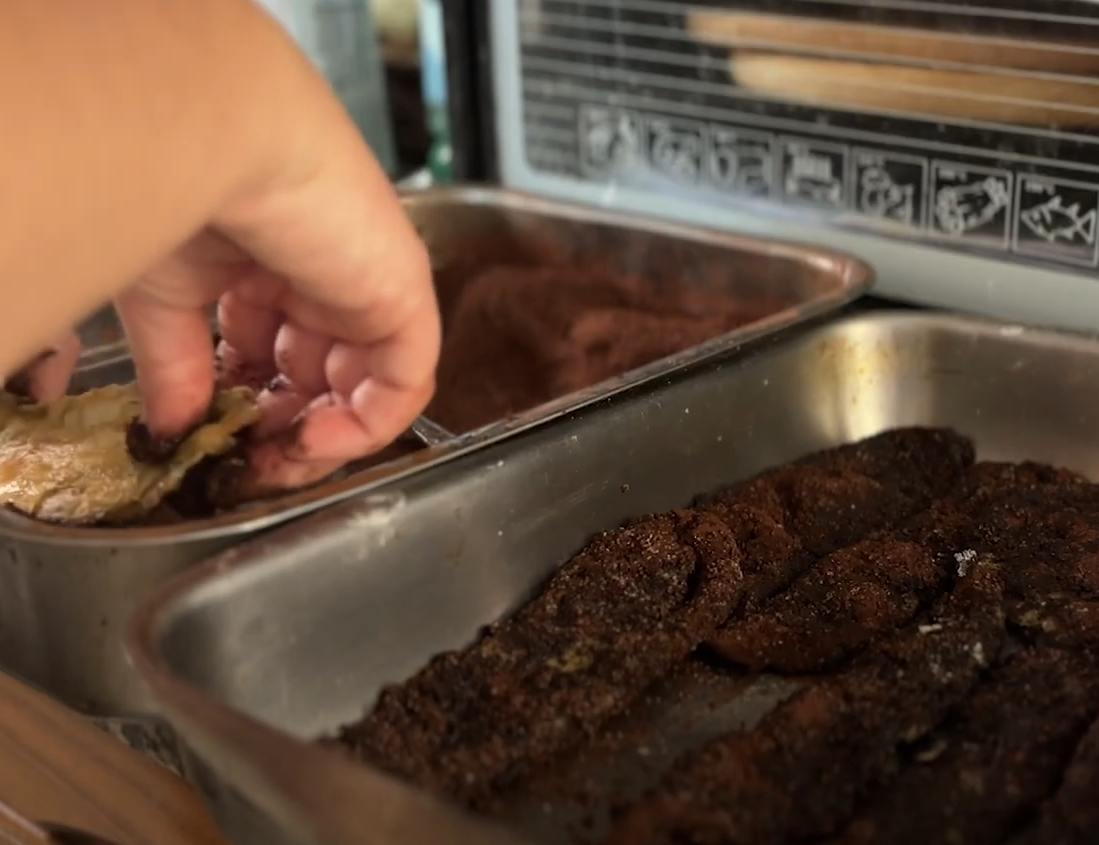
Then coated in chocolate

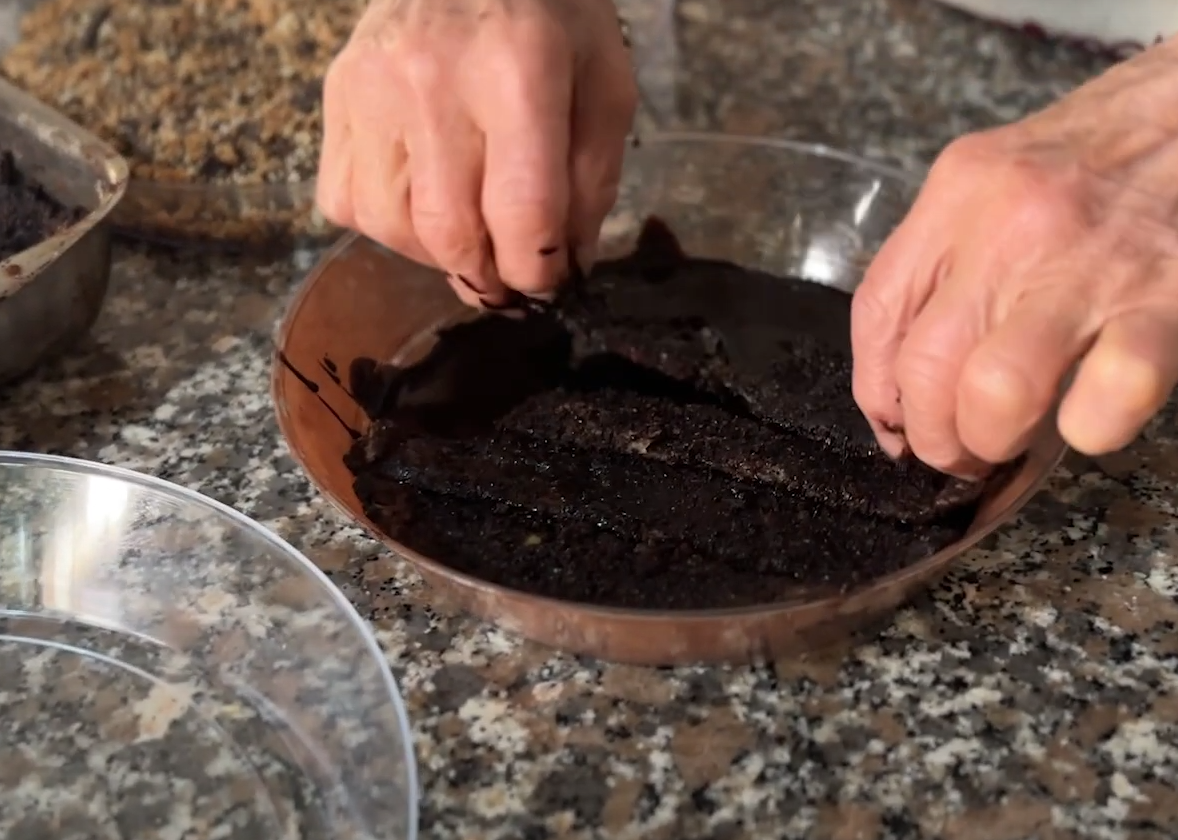
They are placed on chocolate sauce, forming a layer

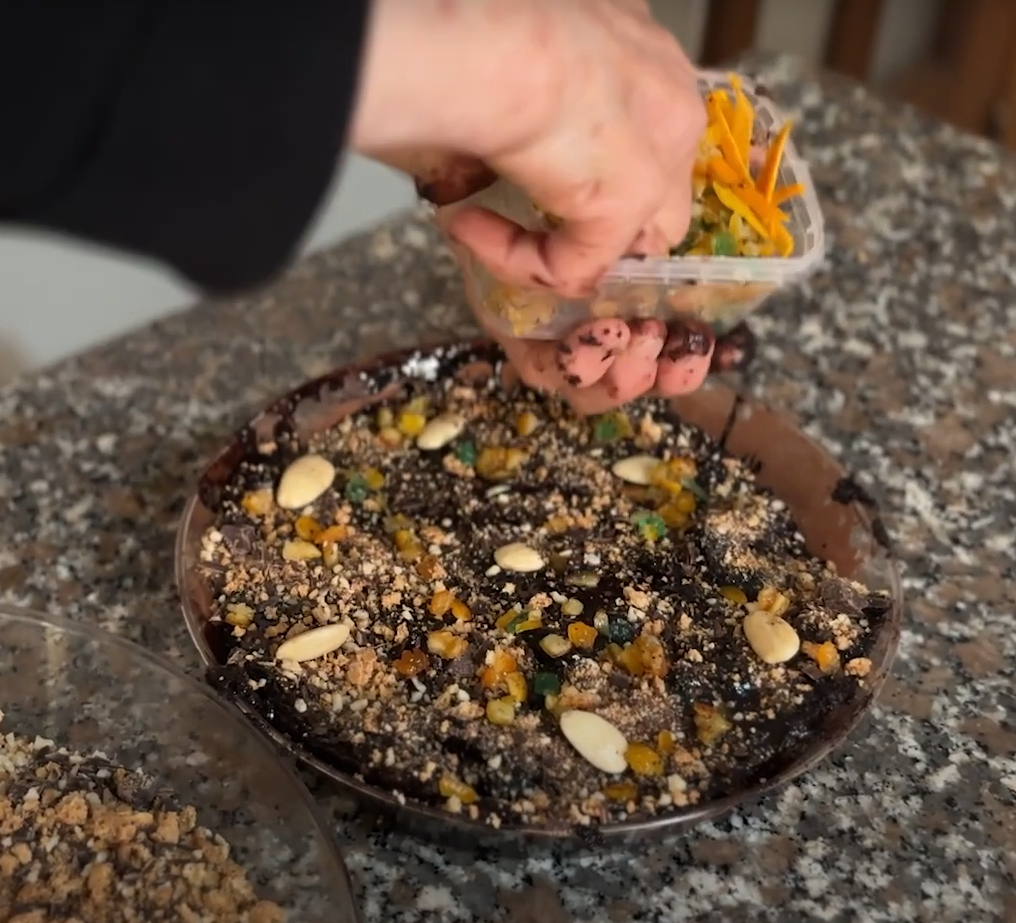
After multiple layers form, toppings are added

== Feast days ==
Today, melanzane al cioccolato is eaten along the Amalfi Coast, exclusively on feast days. For most of the region, this is 15 August, held in Europe to be the peak of summer. On that date, the public holiday Ferragosto occurs, and the Feast of the Assumption of Mary is celebrated. Schwartz describes both adults and children eagerly awaiting the day for the chance to eat the dish.

The town of Minori, located near Maiori, is closely associated with the dessert. Townspeople eat it yearly on 13 July during the feast of the town's patron saint, Trofimena. Baby eggplants are stuffed with ricotta and candied fruit, fried, dipped in melted chocolate, and left to set. It is served with the Italian liqueur limoncello.

== See also ==
- List of Italian desserts and pastries
- Chocolate in savory cooking

== Sources ==
- Contaldo, Gennaro (2006). Gennaro's Italian Year. London: Headline Publishing Group. ISBN 978-07553-1547-5.
- Lagattolla, Franco (1978). The Recipes that Made a Million. London: Orbis Publishing. ISBN 0-85613-489-9.
- Schwartz, Arthur (1998). Naples at Table: Cooking in Campania. New York: HarperCollins. ISBN 0-06-018261-X.
- Scicolone, Michele (2001). Italian Holiday Cooking: A Collection of 150 Treasured Recipes. New York: William Morrow. ISBN 0-06-019991-1.
- Segan, Francine (2011). Dolci: Italy's Sweets. New York: Stewart, Tabori & Chang. ISBN 978-1-58479-898-9.
- Segan, Francine (2015). "Italy". In Goldstein, Darra (ed.). The Oxford Companion to Sugar and Sweets. New York: Oxford University Press. ISBN 978-0-19-931339-6.
