= Mole (sauce) =

Mexican sauce and marinade

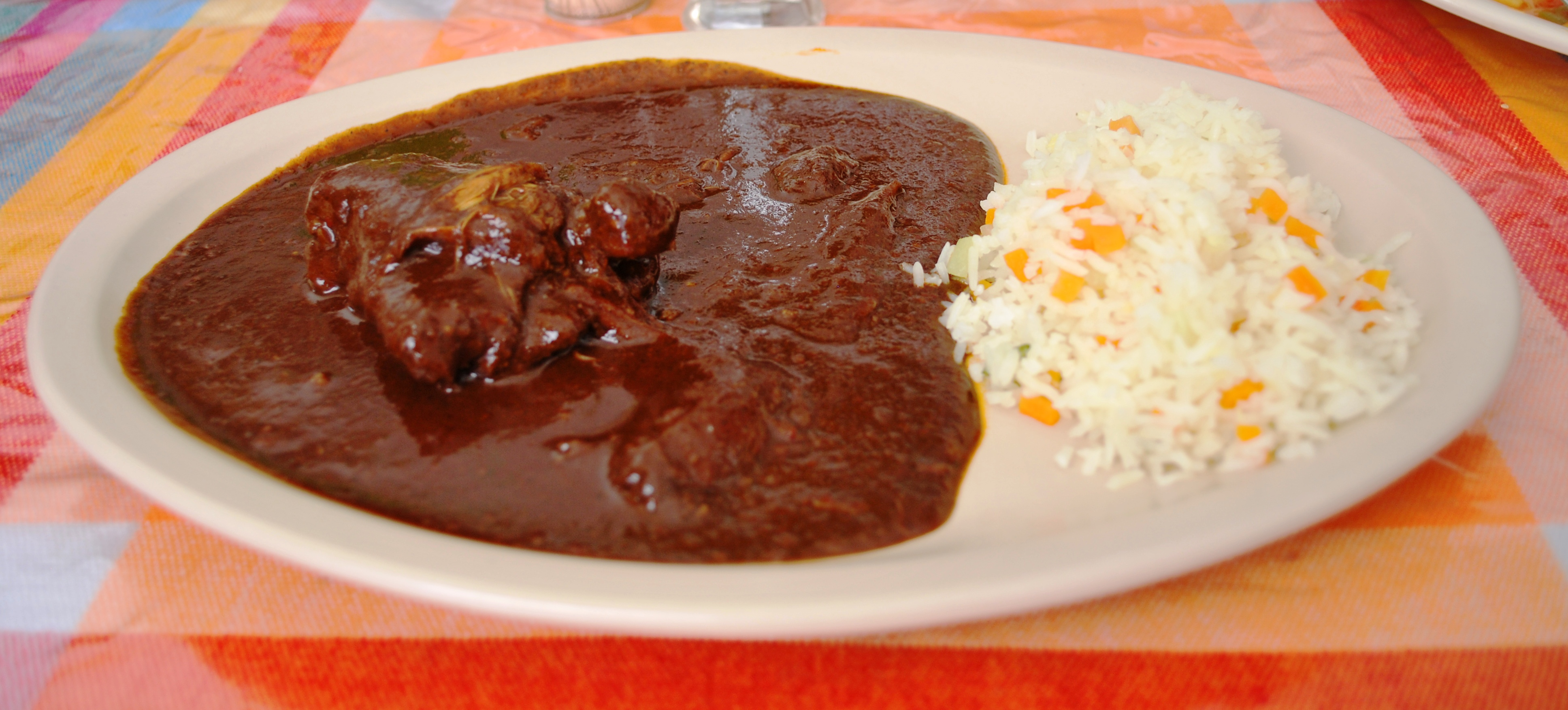
- Chicken in a dark red mole
- Type: Sauce and marinade
- Place of origin: Mexico
- Main ingredients: Chili pepper, spice and nut

Mole (Spanish: [ˈmole]; often hyperforeignized in English menus as molé to distinguish from another homograph for the animal mole) or mōlli (from Nahuatl pronounced [ˈmoːlːi]; lit. 'sauce, something ground') is a traditional sauce and marinade originally used in Mexican cuisine. In contemporary Mexico, the term is used for numerous sauces, including some fifty distinct varieties of mole across Mexico. Generally, a mole sauce contains fruits, nuts, chili peppers, and spices like black pepper, cinnamon, or cumin.

Pre-Hispanic Mexico showcases the role of chocolate, primarily as a beverage rather than a confection. Although modern culinary practices emphasize its versatility, historical evidence indicates that chocolate was most likely a later addition.

While not moles in the classic sense, there are some dishes that use the term in their name. Mole de olla is a stew made from beef and vegetables, which contains guajillo and ancho chili, as well as a number of other ingredients found in moles.

== History ==
Two states in Mexico claim to be the origin of mole: Puebla and Oaxaca. The best-known moles are native to these two states, but other regions in Mexico also make various types of mole sauces.

Moles come in various flavors and ingredients, with chili peppers as the common ingredient. The classic mole version is the variety called mole poblano, which is a dark red or brown sauce served over meat. The dish has become a culinary symbol of Mexico's mestizaje, or mixed indigenous and European heritage, both for the types of ingredients it contains and because of the legends surrounding its origin.

A common legend of its creation takes place at the Convent of Santa Clara in Puebla early in the colonial period. Upon hearing that the archbishop was going to visit, the convent nuns panicked because they were poor and had almost nothing to prepare. The nuns prayed and brought together the little bits of what they did have, including nuts, chili peppers, spices, day-old bread and a little chocolate. They killed an old turkey, cooked it and put the sauce on top; the archbishop loved it. When one of the nuns was asked the name of the dish, she replied, "I made a mole." Mole is an archaic word for "mix"; now, this word mostly refers to the dish and is rarely used to signify other kinds of mixes in Spanish.

A similar version of the story says that monk Fray Pascual invented the dish, again to serve the archbishop of Puebla. In this version, spice containers were knocked or blown over so that their contents spilled into pots in which chicken was cooking. Other versions of the story substitute the viceroy of New Spain, such as Juan de Palafox y Mendoza, in place of the archbishop.

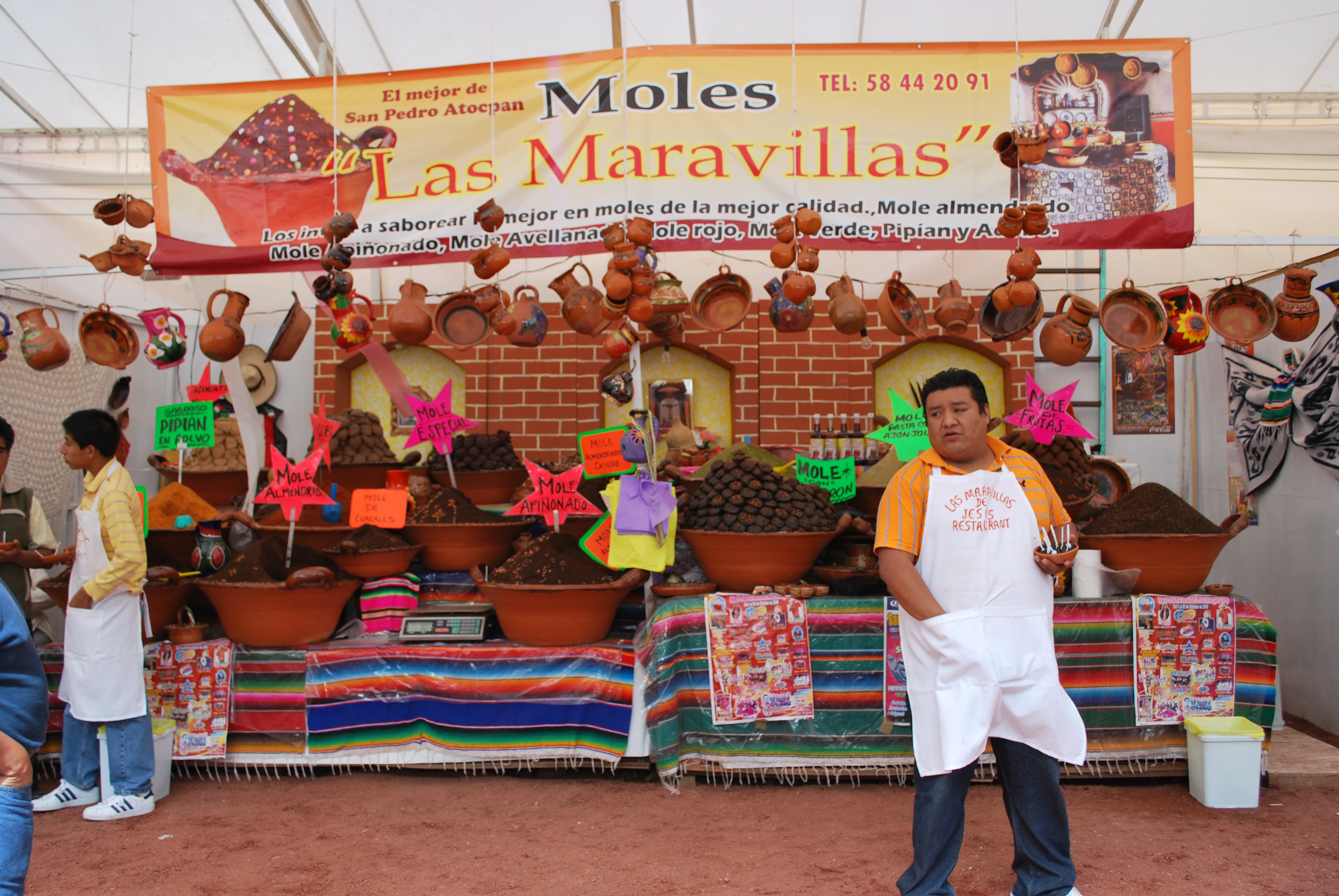
Selling mole mixes at the Feria Nacional del Mole in San Pedro Atocpan

Modern mole is a mixture of ingredients from North America, Europe, Africa, and Asia making it one of the first intercontinental dishes created in the Americas. Its base, however, is indigenous. Nahuatl speakers had a preparation they called mōlli or chīlmōlli (Nahuatl pronunciation: [t͡ʃiːlˈmoːlːi]), meaning "chili sauce".

In the book General History of the Things of New Spain, Bernardino de Sahagún says that mollis were used in a number of dishes, including those for fish, game and vegetables:

Spanish	Nahuatl	English translation
Vende también por oficio vender asados, y carne asada debaxo de tierra, y chilmole de cualquier género que sea, y el mole de masa cocida o de masa de frisoles tostados o cocidos, y de los hongos y xetas, y el mole de tomates gruesos o menudillos, y de las acederas, y de los bledos, y de los pescados, y de las ciruelas o de otras cosas acedas, y de los aguacates mezclados	tlatleoatzalli tlatemalnacatl tlatemalmolli chilmolli texiochilmolli chilcozmolli chiltecpinmollin totocuitlatl molli pucheoac chilmolli tlatonilli emolli [...] nanacamolli aîonanacamolli xitomamolli tomamolli xoxocoiolmolli xocoiolmolli aoacamolli...	He sells meats, sauces, meat sauces, chili sauces, mild red chili sauces, yellow chili sauces [...] mushroom sauces, gourd sauces, large tomato sauces, medium tomato sauces, sorell sauces, avocado sauces...

Theories about the origins of mole have supposed that it was something imposed upon the natives or that it was the product of the baroque artistry of Puebla, but there is not enough evidence for definitive answers.

Despite the fact that a very large number of mole recipes were to be found throughout prehispanic Mesoamerica, few if any contained chocolate, the Mexica reserving the use of chocolate for beverages. In the writings of Sahagún, there is no mention of it being used to flavor dishes.

== Preparation and consumption ==
All mole preparations begin with one or more types of chili pepper.

The classic moles of Central Mexico and Oaxaca, such as mole poblano and mole negro, include two or more of the following types of chili pepper: ancho, pasilla, mulato and chipotle. Other ingredients can include black pepper, achiote, huaje, cumin, clove, anise, tomato, tomatillo, garlic, sesame seed, dried fruit, herbs like hoja santa, and many other ingredients. Mole poblano has an average of 20 ingredients; mole almendrado has an average of 26, and Oaxacan moles can have over 30. Chocolate, if used, is added at the end of cooking. According to Rick Bayless, the ingredients of mole can be grouped into five distinct classes: hot (chili), sour (tomatillo), sweet (fruit and sugar), spice, and thick (seed, nut, tortilla). The preparation of mole negro includes charring several of the ingredients, and a greater amount of chocolate, both of which lead to a black colour.

The ingredients are roasted and ground into a fine powder or paste. This roasting and grinding process is extremely laborious and takes at least a day to accomplish by hand. Traditionally, this work was shared by several generations of women in the family, but after the arrival of electric mills, it became more common to take the ingredients to be ground. Many families have their own varieties of mole passed down for generations, with their preparation reserved for special events in large batches.

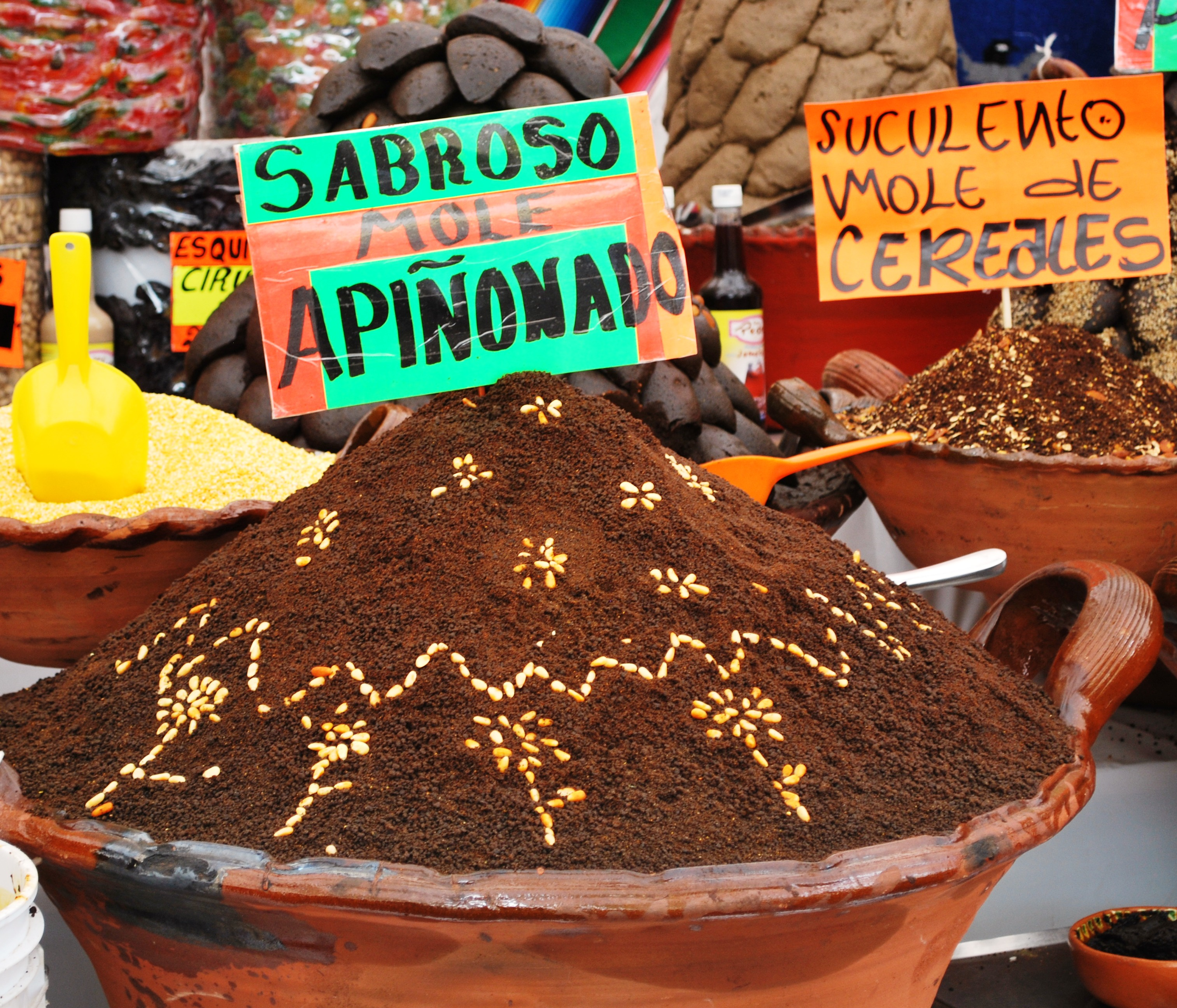
Mole piñón (mole with pine nut)

The resulting powder or paste is mixed with water or broth and simmered until it is pungent and very thick. It is most often prepared in a cazuela or a thick heavy clay cauldron and stirred almost constantly to prevent burning. Due to its thickness, Mexican food authority Patricia Quintana said it is too substantial to be called a sauce. However, it is always served over something and not eaten alone. Mole poblano is traditionally served with turkey, but also with chicken, pork, or other meat (such as lamb).

Some mole powders and pastes can be prepared ahead of time and sold, such as mole poblano, mole negro, and mole colorado. Many markets in Mexico, as well as grocery stores, supermarkets, and online retailers internationally, sell mole pastes and powders in packages or by the kilogram.

Prepared mole sauce will keep for about three days in the refrigerator and it freezes well. The paste will keep six months in the refrigerator and about a year in the freezer. Leftover sauce is often used for the making of tamale and enchilada (often called enmolada) or over egg at brunch.

== Varieties ==
=== Mole verde (green mole) ===
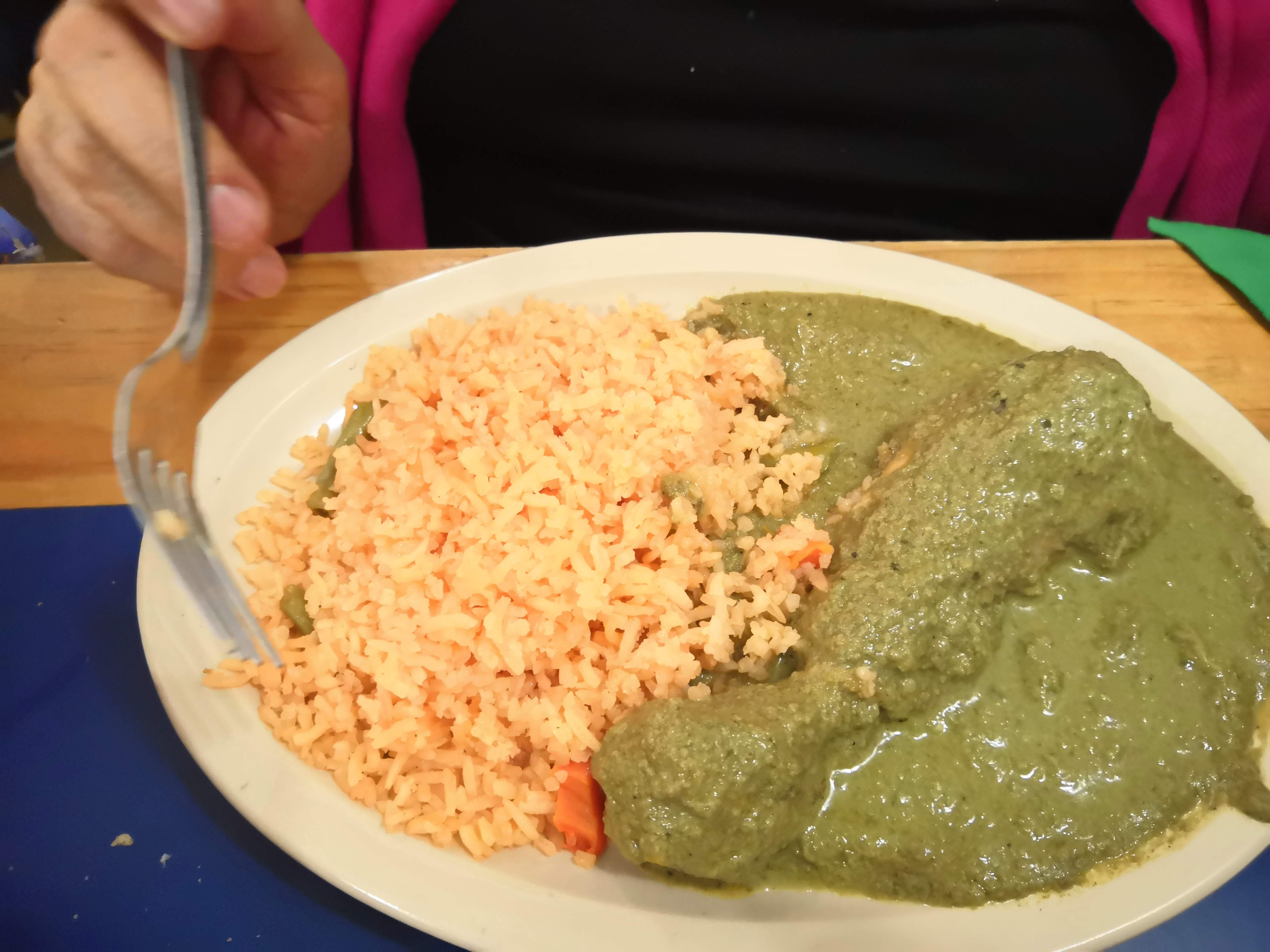
A rich green mole with arroz rojo

The main ingredients in mole verde are pumpkin seeds and green chili, which give color. Other ingredients may be green tomatoes, poblano, chile de árbol, tails onion, radish leaves, puñeton cilantro, lettuce, chard, parsley, epazote, onion, garlic, chicken broth, and a few bolillos or tortillas. This is a traditional recipe that varies depending on the region of the country where it is prepared.

The ingredients are chopped (except the pumpkin seeds) and ground. This preparation is gently fried in a pan with lard or vegetable oil. The seeds are ground with chicken broth or water and incorporated into the above, taking care of the amount to be added to achieve the desired consistency. This mole is served with chicken or pork and can be accompanied by red or white rice or beans.

=== Chimole ===
Chimole is common in Yucatán, and Belize. It is also known as "Black Dinner" because of its dark appearance. It is usually made from bone-in chicken or relleno, onions, carrots, boiled eggs that are added at the last minute, and occasionally peppers or tomatoes, as well as some black recado (achiote paste, made from pounded annatto seeds, blackened corn tortillas, and a blend of spices/aromatics used in Maya cuisine), in blocks. It is eaten with corn/flour tortillas.

=== Mole rojo ===
Mole rojo (red mole) is a traditional Mexican sauce known for its deep red color, rich flavor, and complex blend of dried chiles, spices, nuts, seeds, and sometimes fruit or chocolate. It is one of the many regional varieties of mole. Michoacán-style mole rojo emphasizes dried peppers and nuts, while Oaxacan mole rojo may include more spices and chocolate. It is cherished for its bold taste and festive use, with a smoky, earthy, and slightly sweet flavor, a thick, velvety texture and layered complexity from slow simmering and ingredient blending. It is commonly served over chicken, pork, or turkey, used in enchiladas de mole rojo. It is accompanied by rice, tortillas, or tamales.

== Regional varieties ==
=== Mexico ===
==== Oaxaca ====
Oaxaca has been called "the land of the seven moles". Its large size, mountainous terrain, variety of indigenous peoples, and many microclimates make for numerous regional variations in its food. From this has come moles amarillo, chichilo, colorado, estofado, manchamantel, negro, rojo and verde, all differently colored and flavored, based on the use of distinctive chilis and herbs. Manchamantel, a chicken and fruit stew, is questioned by some such as Susana Trilling in her book My Search for the Seventh Mole: A Story with Recipes from Oaxaca, Mexico, whether it is a true mole. In addition, those from Puebla claim this dish as their own.

Different regions of Oaxaca also have unique moles, such as mole blanco or mole de movia from the Mixteca, and mole costeño from the coast.

==== Puebla ====
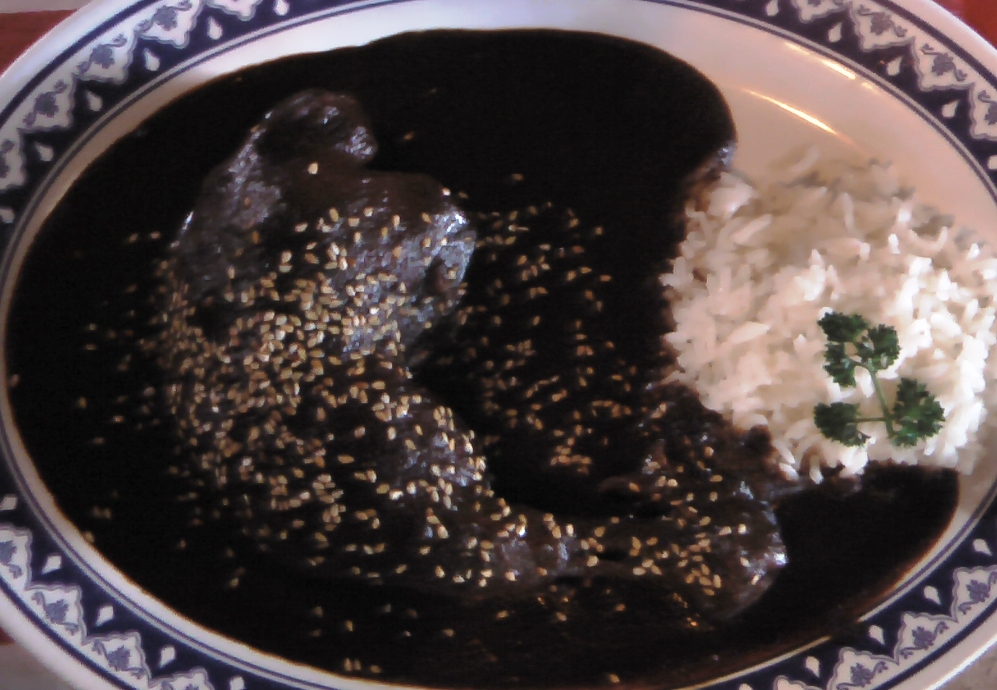
Chicken with mole poblano

Mole poblano is perhaps the best known of all mole varieties. An ancient dish native to the state of Puebla, it has been called the national dish of Mexico, and ranked first as the most typical of Mexican dishes.

==== San Pedro Atocpan, Mexico City ====
San Pedro Atocpan is an agricultural community in the mountains south of Mexico City. Until the mid-20th century it was similar to those surrounding it, growing corn, fava bean and nopal (prickly pear cactus). Electricity and other modern conveniences were slow to arrive, allowing the community to retain more of its traditions longer. In 1940, Father Damian Sartes San Roman came to the parish of San Pedro Atocpan and saw the potential in marketing mole to raise living standards in the area. At that time, only four neighborhoods prepared mole for town festivals: Panchimalco, Ocotitla, Nuztla and Tula, but those who prepared it were generally prominent women in their communities.

In the 1940s, one family made the long trek to Mexico City proper to sell some of their mole at the La Merced Market. It was successful, but they brought with them only two kilograms since it was made by hand grinding the ingredients on a metate. The arrival of electricity in the late 1940s made the use of a powered mill possible, and better roads made the trek to the city easier. Some of these mills were bought or financed by Father Sartes, but the mole was still cooked in a clay pot over a wood fire. In the 1970s, he was part of a small group which became a cooperative, which constructed the Las Cazuelas restaurant. This is where the first Mole Exhibition was held in 1978.

The care and tradition that went into the moles from there made them popular and made the town famous in the Mexico City area. Today, San Pedro Atocpan produces 60% of the moles consumed in Mexico and 89% of the moles consumed in Mexico City, with a total estimated production of between 28,000 and 30,000 tons each year. Ninety-two percent of the town's population makes a living preparing mole powders and pastes, all in family businesses. Prices for mole run between 80 and 160 pesos per kilogram, depending on the maker and the type. A number of moles are made in the town, but mole almendrado is signature to the area. Producers in Atocpan have their own versions of the various types of mole, often keeping recipes strictly secret. The production in the town has become very competitive, especially in quality. Twenty-two brands are permitted to print "Made in San Pedro Atocpan" on their labels.

==== Other ====
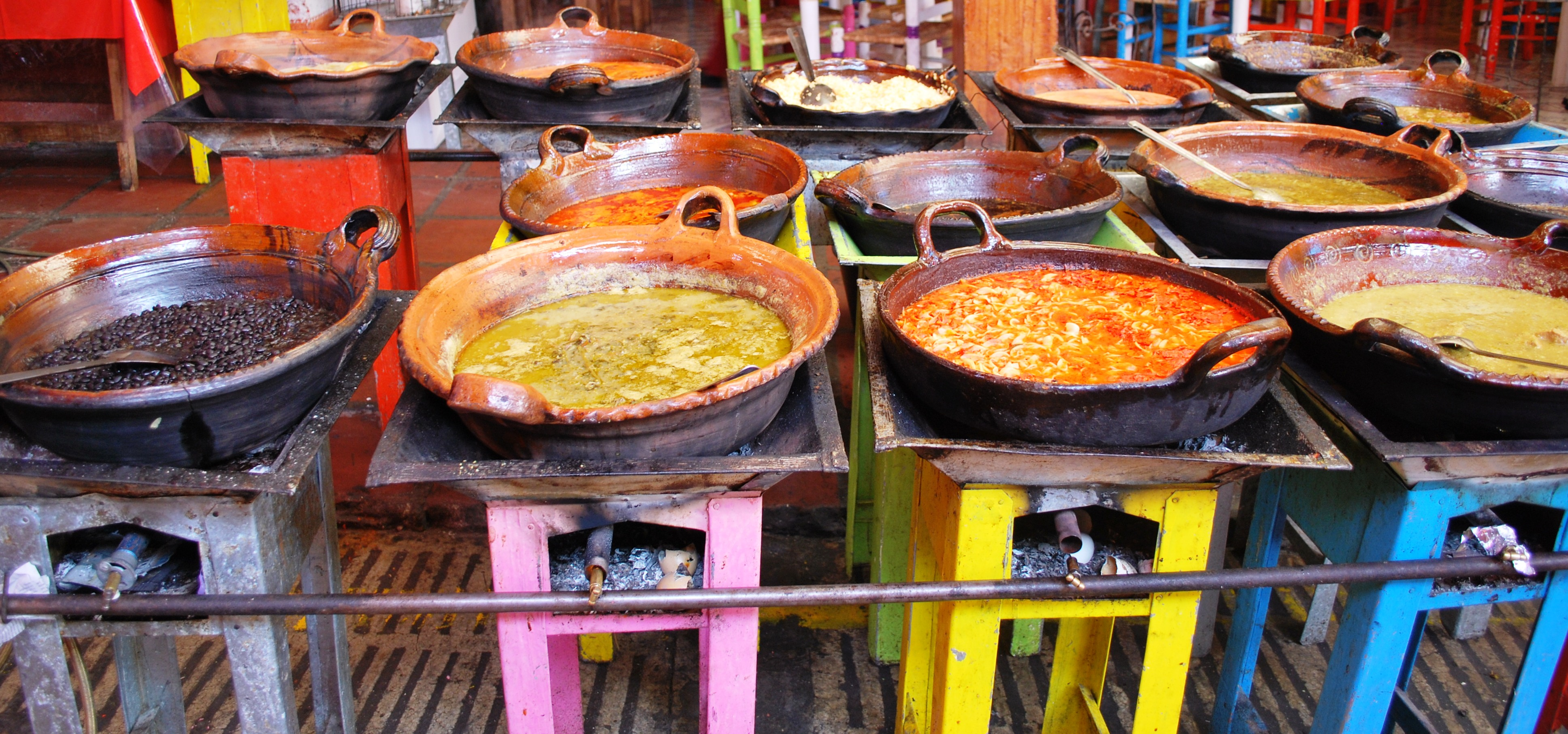
Mole and other dishes simmering in cazuela in Chalma, Malinalco, Mexico State

Various types of mole sauces can be found throughout the center of Mexico toward the south. There is the mole michoacan from Michoacan, mole prieto from Tlaxcala, mole ranchero from Morelos, mole tamaulipeco from Tamaulipas, mole xiqueño from Xico, Veracruz, and more.

Mole verde, from Veracruz, is made from ground peanut, tomatillo, cilantro and more, and served over pork.

Mole pipián is a type of mole which mostly consists of ground squash seeds. It generally contains tomatillo, hoja santa, chili pepper, garlic and onion to give it a green hue. There is also a red version, which combines the squash seed with peanut, red jalapeño or chipotle, and sesame seed. Like other moles, it is cooked with broth and then served with poultry and pork, or sometimes with fish and vegetable.

Mole rosa from Taxco, Guerrero, is very mild.

Chimole is also known as "Black Dinner" because of its dark appearance and is common in Yucatán, Mexico and Belize. Ingredients include spices and some black recado (achiote paste, a blend of spices commonly used in Maya cuisine) in blocks. This dish was first known by Yucatec Maya, but because of the Belize's vast cultural diversity, most Belizeans make it in their homes and for special occasions. The dish can be served with hot boiled egg, corn tortilla, rice, or just by itself.

Guacamole is a mild avocado sauce.

Huaxmole is a mole sauce variation, which is soupy and often served over goat meat (cabrito).

== As a common dish ==
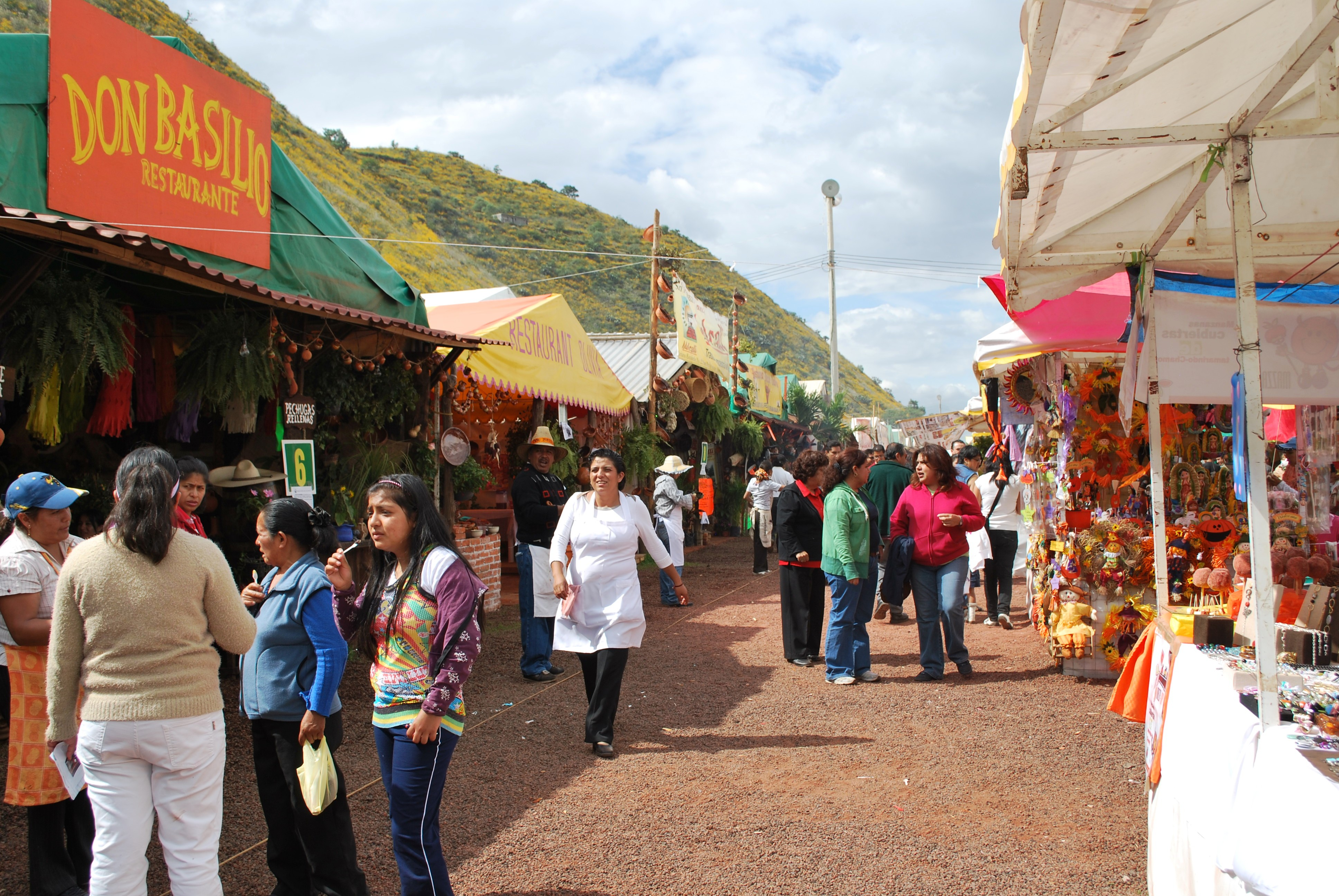
Restaurant stands at the Mole National Fair in San Pedro Atocpan

Mole is one of the most representative dishes of Mexico, especially for major celebrations. Ninety-nine percent of Mexicans have tried at least one type of mole.

The consumption of mole is associated with celebrations. In Mexico, to say "to go to a mole" (ir a un mole) means to go to a wedding. Mole has a strong flavor, especially the dark ones, and is considered to be an acquired taste for most. This has spawned another saying, (estar) en su mero mole, which means something like "(to be) one's cup of tea" or "(to be) in one’s element".

To promote their regional versions of the sauce, several Mexican places host festivals dedicated to it. The Feria Nacional del Mole (National Festival of Mole) was begun in 1977 in San Pedro Atocpan, and is held each year in October. The four restaurants there decided to take advantage of the festival of the Señor de las Misericordias (Lord of the Mercies) to promote their moles. Some 37 restaurants and mole producers now participate in the event.

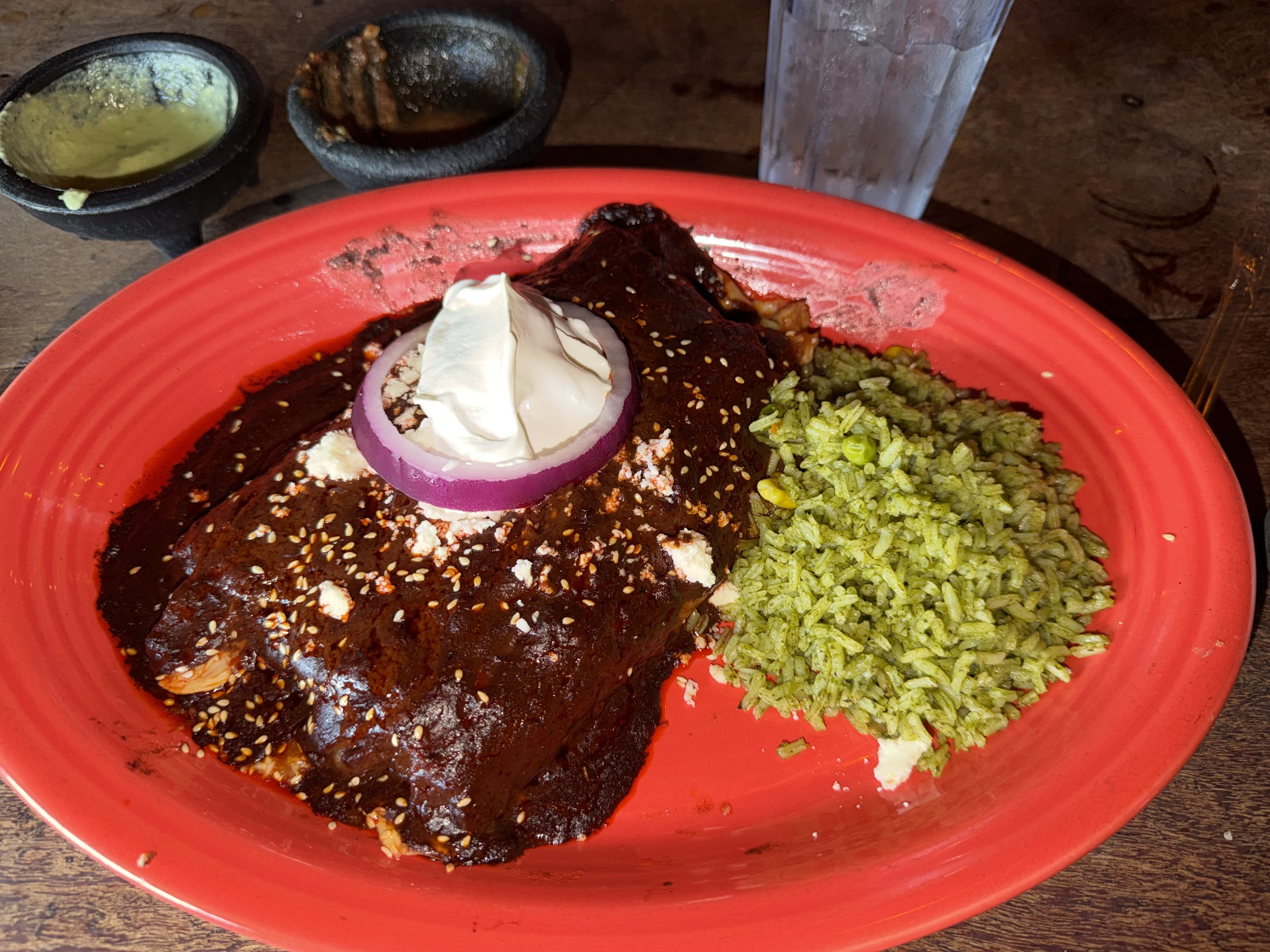
Mole poblano enchiladas

The women of Santa María Magdalena in Querétaro have been locally known for their mole for about 100 years. In 1993, they decided to hold a contest for the best mole. The Feria del Mole y Tortilla (Mole and Tortilla Festival) features a mole cook-off and attracts hundreds of visitors from the state. The community of Coatepec de Morelos in the municipality of Zitácuaro, Michoacán, holds an annual Feria de Mole in April.

Mole is a common food in the United States. Chicago has an annual mole festival for Mexican immigrants at the Universidad Popular community center.

== See also ==
- Chocolate in savory cooking
- List of sauces
