= Colin M. Selbie =

Scottish zoologist (1889-1916)

Colin Mackenzie Selbie
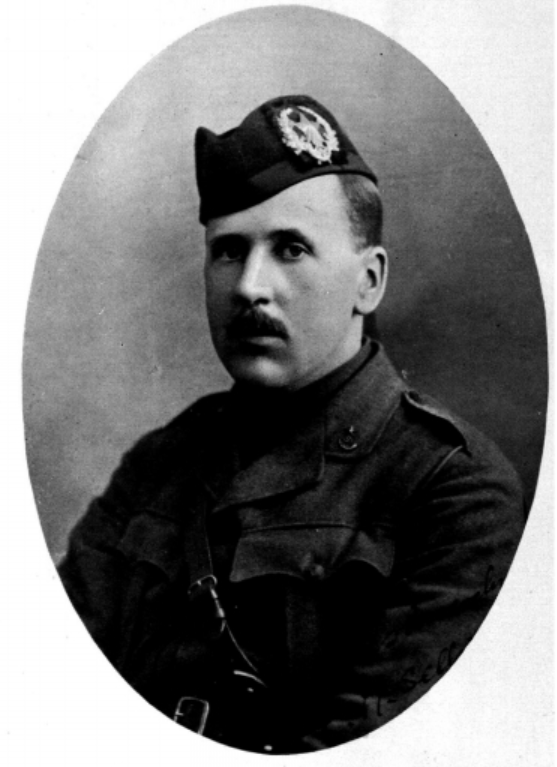
- Born: 24 February 1889; Birsay, Scotland
- Died: 14 July 1916 (aged 27); Somme, France
- Known for: work on Irish crustacea
- Scientific career
- Fields: Zoology
- Workplaces: National Museum of Ireland

Colin Mackenzie Selbie (24 February 1889 – 14 July 1916) was a Scottish zoologist who worked in the Natural History Museum Dublin and took part in the Clare Island Survey. Though he had a short career, his impact on the Irish study of crustacea and myriapoda was noted by those he worked with.

== Early life ==
Selbie was born in Birsay on 24 February 1889 to John and Margaret Selbie (née Mackenzie), though his year of birth is often cited as 1890. His father, John Alexander Selbie, was a minister in the Free Church and later went on to be a professor at Aberdeen United Free College. Selbie was third child of four, having an older brother William Philip, an older sister Jane, and a younger sister Eleanor. He held a B.Sc. degree from the University of Aberdeen, graduating in 1910.

== Zoological career ==
Selbie took up the position of Assistant Naturalist in the Dublin Museum of Science and Art in 1911. Under the guidance of Robert Francis Scharff, Selbie worked on crustacea and myriapoda, most notably on the specimens from the Fisheries cruiser the Helga and the Clare Island Survey. His ability to illustrate his monographs was a talent that was noted by his contemporaries.

He named one crustacea, Palinurus thomsoni, in honour of his former Professor John Arthur Thomson.

== Military career ==
Selbie enlisted into the 15th Royal Scots Regiment on the outbreak of World War I as a private on 4 November 1914. On the recommendation of his C.O. he received a commission into the Scottish Rifles where he attained the rank of Second Lieutenant in January 1915. He died on the Somme in July 1916. Selbie is commemorated on the Thiepval Memorial to the Missing of the Somme, and on the Birsay War Memorial.

== Works ==
- 1912 Some new Irish myriapods The Irish naturalist, Vol. XXI, No. 6, pp. 113–115
- 1912 National Museum of Science and Art, Dublin: Natural History Collections: Crustacea Museum bulletin: National Museum of Science and Art, Dublin, Vol. II, Part 1
- 1913 New records of Irish myriapods The Irish naturalist, Vol. XXII, No. 7, pp. 131–135
- 1913 National Museum of Science and Art, Dublin: Natural History Division: Our Knowledge of the higher crustacea in Ireland Museum bulletin: National Museum of Science and Art, Dublin, Vol. III, Part 3-4
