= Lobster stew =

Various stews involving lobster

Menorcan lobster stew
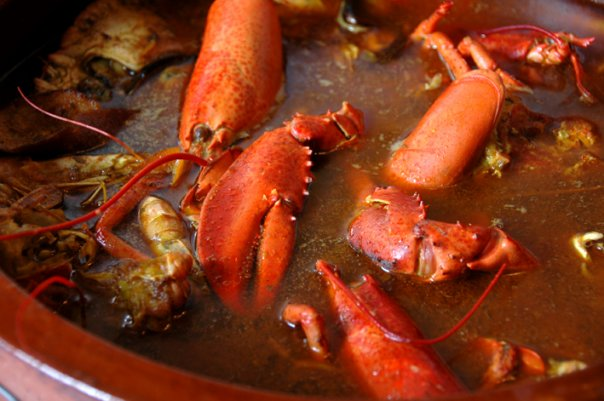
- Type: Soup
- Place of origin: Spain, United States
- Region or state: Menorca, Maine
- Main ingredients: Lobster

Lobster stew is found in a variety of cuisines. Two famous versions are Menorcan caldera de llagosta (with European spiny lobster), and Maine lobster stew (with American lobster).

== Spain ==
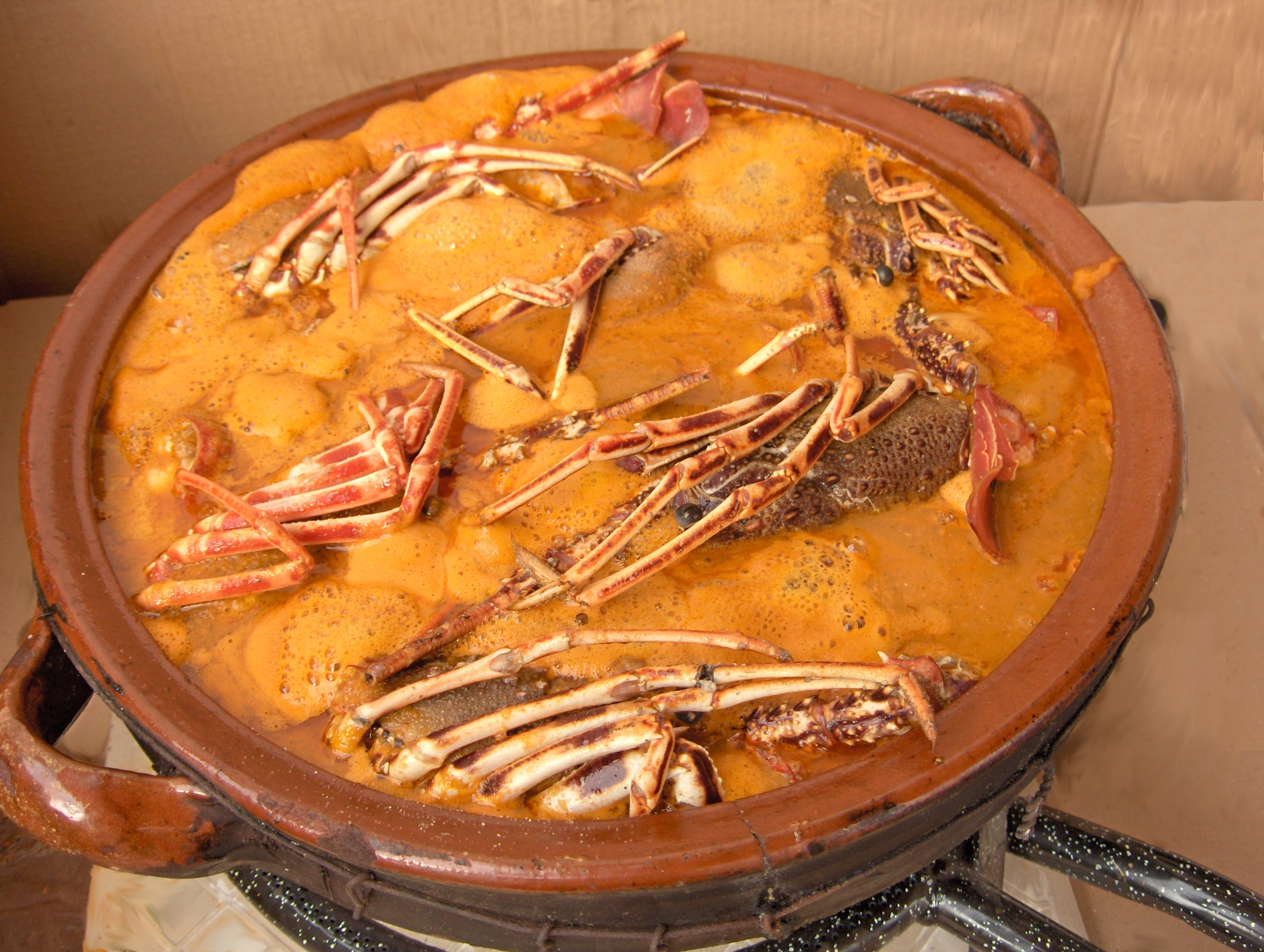
Caldera de llagosta (European spiny lobster as main ingredient)

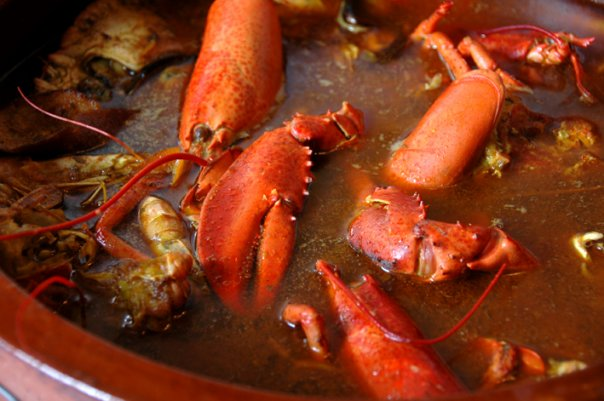
Caldera de llamàntol (European lobster as main ingredient)

Perhaps the most famous lobster stew recipes are those from the isle of Menorca. The term caldereta has become popular in use and most locals use it more often than the term caldera, even if that latter is the originally correct term for designating this variety of lobster dishes. The most symbolic recipe in the island is the caldera de llagosta. It is made out of local European spiny lobsters (Palinurus elephas, llagosta in Balearic). Menorcan equally, yet far less emblematic, is the caldera de llamàntol, which uses European lobsters (llamàntol in Balearic) instead of spiny lobsters.

Lobster is added to a sofrito, onions, tomatoes, garlic and parsley and boiled, and is eaten with thin slices of bread. It is a signature dish of Menorca, and even the monarchy of Spain has been known to travel to Menorca to enjoy it.

This dish is only available during spring and summer, because the local lobsters are protected and can only be captured between March and August.

A very similar recipe which also includes saffron, green peppers, wine and brandy can be called langosta a la catalana (Spanish for 'Catalan-fashioned spiny lobster'). Another recipe involves a sauce of lobster blood and chocolate.

== New England ==
Lobster stew, along with the lobster roll, is one of the most popular lobster dishes in Maine. The ingredient species is the local American lobster (Homarus americanus). It is similar to New England clam chowder in that it is based on milk. Unlike most Maine lobster dishes, it uses shelled lobster meat.

== See also ==
- List of fish and seafood soups
- List of seafood dishes
