= Palinurus barbarae =

Conservation status
- Data Deficient (IUCN 3.1)

Scientific classification
- Kingdom: Animalia
- Phylum: Arthropoda
- Class: Malacostraca
- Order: Decapoda
- Suborder: Pleocyemata
- Family: Palinuridae
- Genus: Palinurus
- Species: P. barbarae

Binomial name
- Palinurus barbarae Groeneveld, Griffiths & van Dalsen, 2006

Species of crustacean

Palinurus barbarae is a species of spiny lobster described in 2006, which was found by fishermen working the waters above the Walters Shoals, a series of submerged mountains 700 kilometres (430 mi) south of Madagascar. The animal weighs 4 kilograms (8.8 lb) and reaches up to 40 centimetres (16 in) long excluding the long antennae, and is similar to P. delagoae, found off South Africa, from which it may be differentiated by a number of characters including the larger number of spines. There are fears that the species, which lives in an area outside any country's jurisdiction, may now be exploited, or that it has already been brought near to extinction by overfishing.
