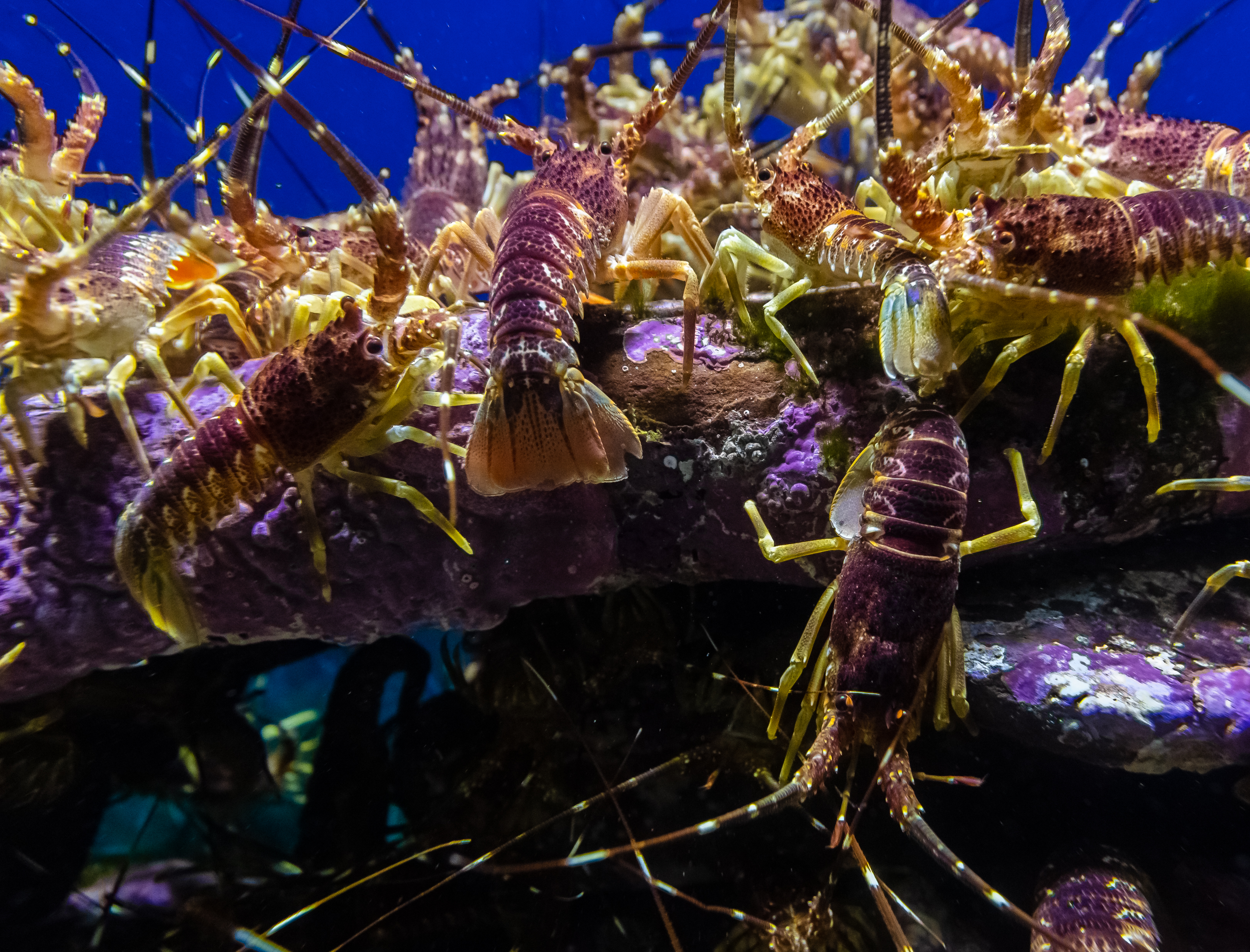

Conservation status
- Least Concern (IUCN 3.1)

Scientific classification
- Kingdom: Animalia
- Phylum: Arthropoda
- Clade: Pancrustacea
- Class: Malacostraca
- Order: Decapoda
- Suborder: Pleocyemata
- Family: Palinuridae
- Genus: Palinurus
- Species: P. gilchristi

Binomial name
- Palinurus gilchristi Stebbing, 1900

= Palinurus gilchristi =

Species of crustacean

Palinurus gilchristi, the southern spiny lobster, is a species of spiny lobster within the family Palinuridae.

It is distributed in the Atlantic and Indian Ocean near the coasts of South Africa from Cape Province to Port Alfred, where it lives in rocky areas as shelter at depths of 55 to 360 metres (180 to 1,180 ft). It has also been reported in Fort Dauphin, Madagascar, however this is likely a misidentification.

Males can grow to lengths of 16 centimetres (6.3 in) whereas females can grow up to 31 cm (12 in). Individuals live up to 10 to 12.5 years, however some may reach over 30 years.

== Conservation ==
Between 1974 and 2004 the catch per unit effort of the species declined by 70%, and although there have been declines in the pass that suggest a 'Vulnerable' assessment, the species population has been increasing over the past 10 years. It is predicted that due to restrictions and management by fisheries the population of the species will increase and stabilise with no declines. For these reasons the IUCN Red List has assessed the species as 'Least concern'.
