= Maricel Presilla =

American chef and author

Maricel Presilla is a chef, culinary historian, and author. She is best known for her Hoboken, New Jersey restaurants Cucharamama and Zafra. She is also a former history lecturer at Rutgers University before she entered the food industry.

== Biography ==
Maricel E. Presilla is the first Latin American woman to have been invited as a guest chef at the White House. She was nominated twice for James Beard Foundation journalism awards for articles written for Saveur magazine. She was a four-time James Beard Foundation Award nominee and won as Best Chef Mid-Atlantic on 7 May 2012. A year later, on 4 May 2013, her book Gran Cocina Latina: The Food of Latin America was named Cookbook of the Year by the James Beard Foundation. The International Association of Culinary Professionals chose Gran Cocina Latina as the best general book on 9 April 2013. Presilla is the chef and co-owner of Cucharamama in Hoboken, New Jersey, Zafra and Ultramarinos, her Latin American marketplace, bakery and chocolate shop are also in Hoboken. She specializes in the foods of Latin America and Spain. She also "holds a doctorate in medieval Spanish history from New York University and has received formal training in cultural anthropology. She taught at Rutgers University in their history department"

Presilla has studied tropical crops, cacao and vanilla agriculture, as well as chocolate production and "is the president of Gran Cacao Company, a Latin American chocolate research and marketing company that specializes in the sale of premium cacao beans from Latin America." She writes the column Cocina for the Miami Herald since 2003. She is a member of the advisory board of the Latin American food studies program of the Culinary Institute of America in San Antonio. In September 2009, she received the Silver Spoon Award from the trade magazine Food Arts for her performance in the culinary arts. In 2012, she was appointed the chairman of the newly created Felipe Rojas-Lombardi Memorial Scholarship Fund of the James Beard Foundation, and is a board member of the Fine Chocolate Industry Association. Presilla is a contributing editor for Saveur magazine. She is also a Grand Jury member and one of the founders of the newly created International Chocolate Awards based in London.

== Publications ==
- Peppers of the Americas, Lorena Jones Books (2017), ISBN 9780399578922
- Gran Cocina Latina: The Food of Latin America, W. W. Norton, (2012). ISBN 978-0-393-05069-1.
- The New Taste of Chocolate: A Cultural and Natural History of Chocolate with Recipes, Ten Speed Press, (2001, revised edition 2009).
- Feliz Nochebuena, Feliz Navidad: Christmas Feasts of the Hispanic Caribbean (Holt)
- Life Around the Lake (Holt)
- Mola: Cuna Life, Stories, And Art (Holt, 1995)
