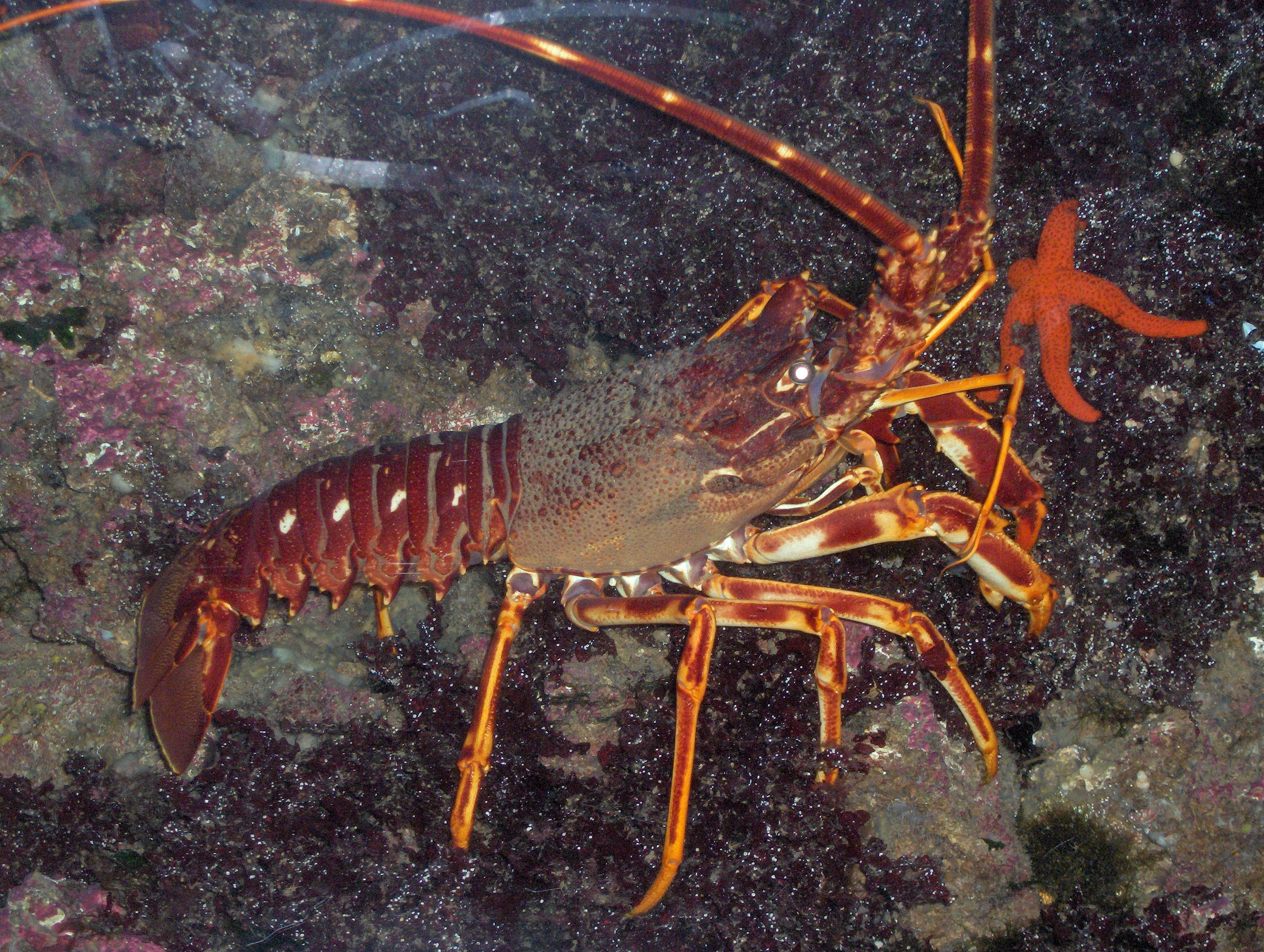

Conservation status
- Vulnerable (IUCN 3.1)

Scientific classification
- Kingdom: Animalia
- Phylum: Arthropoda
- Clade: Pancrustacea
- Class: Malacostraca
- Order: Decapoda
- Suborder: Pleocyemata
- Family: Palinuridae
- Genus: Palinurus
- Species: P. elephas

Binomial name
- Palinurus elephas (Fabricius, 1787)

Synonyms
- Palinurus vulgaris Latreille, 1803

= Palinurus elephas =

Species of crustacean

Palinurus elephas is a commonly caught species of spiny lobster from the East Atlantic Ocean and the Mediterranean Sea. Its common names include European spiny lobster, crayfish or cray (in Ireland), crawfish (in England), common spiny lobster, Mediterranean lobster and red lobster.

== Distribution and habitat ==
Palinurus elephas is a common species of spiny lobster, found in the eastern Atlantic Ocean, from southern Norway to Morocco and the Azores, and in the Mediterranean Sea, except its eastern extremes. It lives on rocky exposed coasts below the intertidal zone, mainly at depths of 20 to 70 metres (66 to 230 ft). It is named after the ancient Roman Tyrrhenian sea port of Palinurus (modern day Palinuro, Campania, Italy) where they are found in abundance off its promontory.

== Description ==
P. elephas may reach up to 60 cm (24 in) long, although rarely longer than 40 cm (16 in), and usually 25–30 cm (10–12 in). Few achieve their maximum weight of several kilograms.

The adults are reddish-brown with yellow spots. The carapace is slightly compressed and lacks lateral ridges. It is covered with forward pointing spines, with the supraorbital spines prominent. The antennae are very heavy and spiny, are tapering and even longer than the body. The first walking leg (pereopod) is provided with subchela (the distal end of a limb developed as a prehensile structure). The fourth segment (merus) of this leg has a characteristic row of spines.

== Reproduction ==
The breeding season is in September and October, with the female brooding the reddish eggs. These eggs hatch about six months later in the spring as flattened, leaf-shaped, planktonic larvae (phyllosoma larvae). P. elephas goes through ten phyllosoma stages and a puerulus stage before adulthood.

== Diet ==
It is nocturnal and feeds on small worms, crabs or dead animals, hiding in rock crevices or caves during the day.

== Uses ==
It is a much sought-after delicacy and is widely caught for food around the Mediterranean Sea and the Atlantic coasts of Morocco, Portugal, Spain and southern France, mostly with lobster pots. It is also caught less intensively off the Atlantic Coasts of Britain and Ireland. There are also small fisheries for this species on the west coast of Scotland, employing tangle nets or lobster pots. Palinurus elephas is the main ingredient of most lobster dishes around the Mediterranean shores, like the Menorcan caldereta de langosta (see lobster stew).
