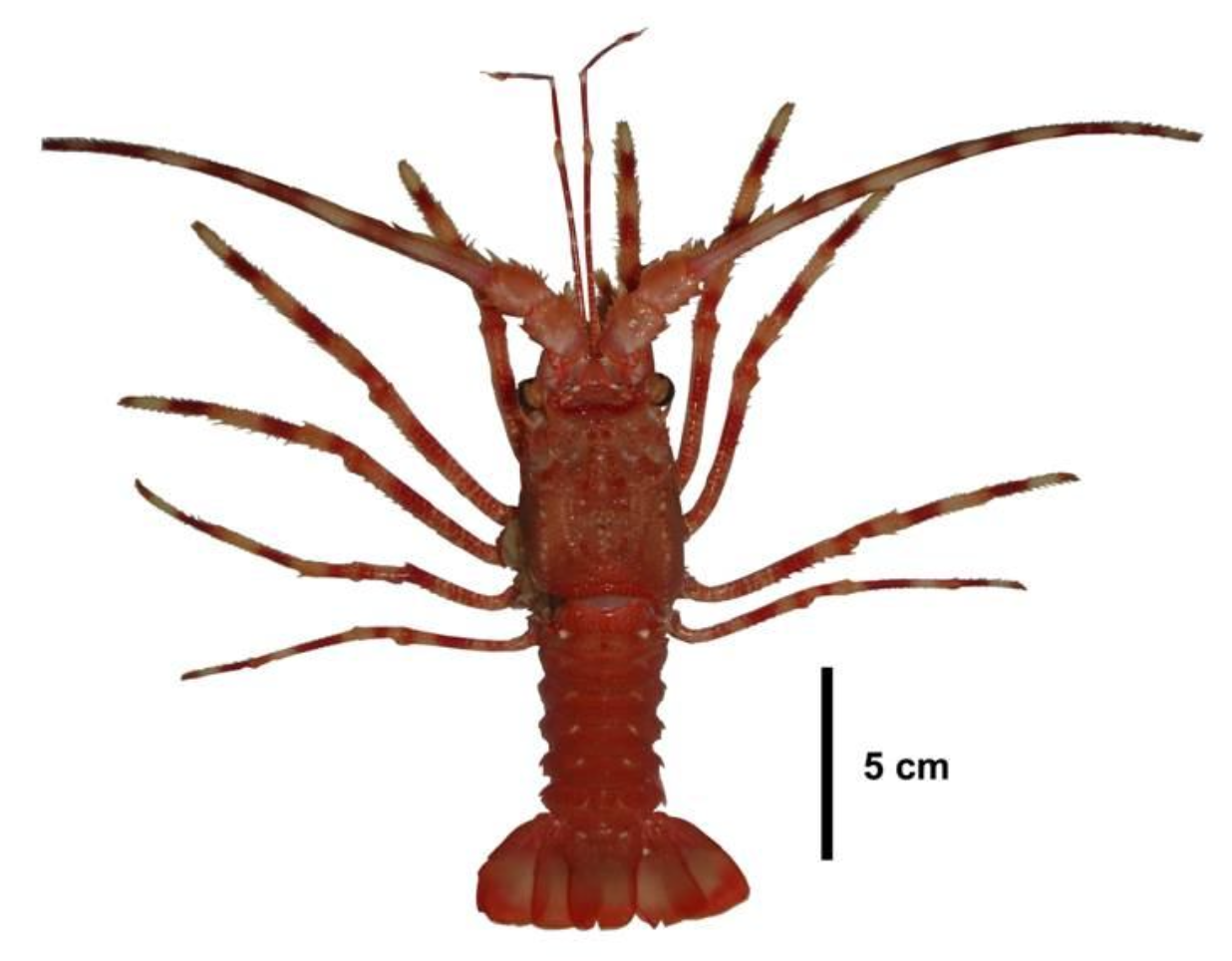
- Palinustus waguensis

Scientific classification
- Kingdom: Animalia
- Phylum: Arthropoda
- Clade: Pancrustacea
- Class: Malacostraca
- Order: Decapoda
- Suborder: Pleocyemata
- Family: Palinuridae
- Genus: Palinustus; A. Milne Edwards, 1880

Type species
- Palinustus truncatus A. Milne Edwards, 1880

= Palinustus =

Genus of spiny lobsters

Palinustus, sometimes referred to as blunthorn lobsters, is a genus of spiny lobsters which primarily live in coral reefs along the Indo-West Pacific region, with some members of this genus being found in the Western Atlantic, Taiwan, and Japan.

Like many other members of its family, Palinuridae, members of the Palinustus genus have spiny bodies, with slightly prismatic carapaces. Notably, members of the Palinustus genus can be distinguished from other genera of spiny lobsters through their widely separated supraorbital horns with truncated ends, along with their large, kidney-shaped eyes and long antennas which end in a whip-like flagellum. While there exists some variation in sizes and colour amongst species, most members of the Palinustus genus have bodies primarily consisting of orange and red tones, along with lighter-coloured bands on its pereiopods and/or antennae.

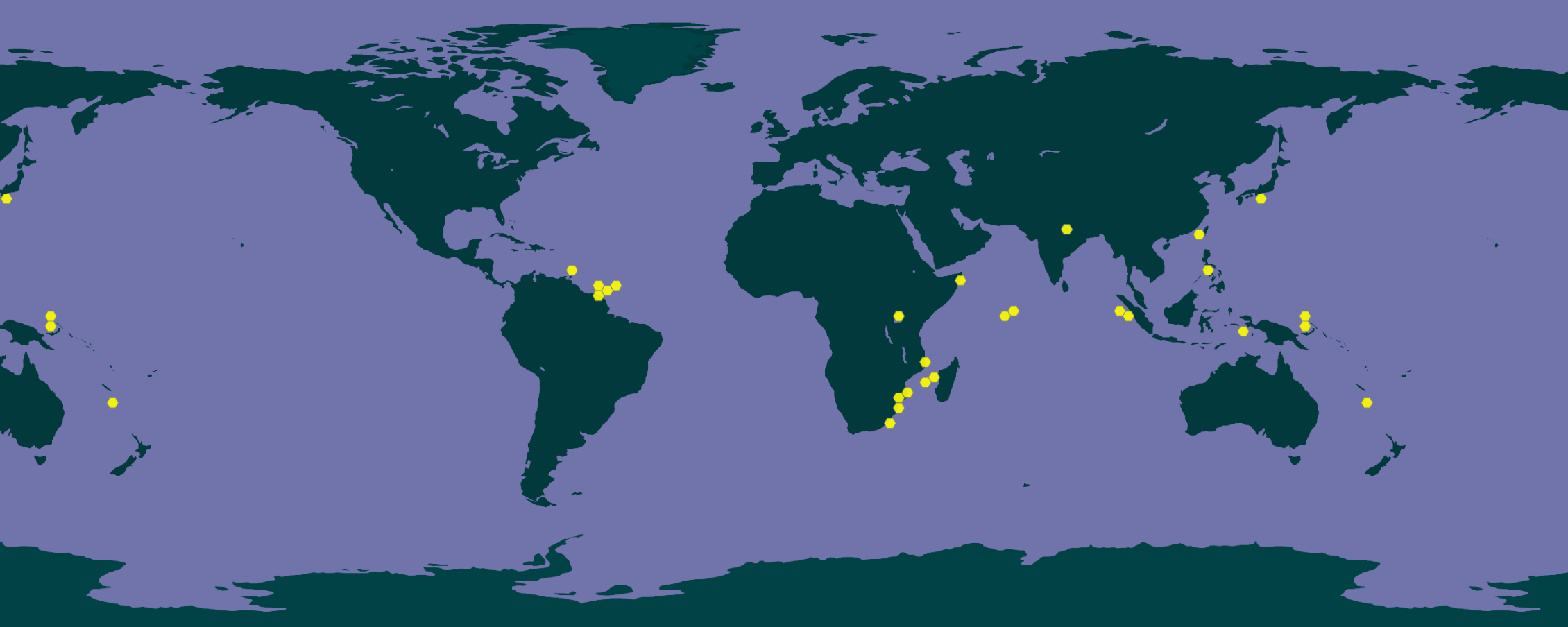
distribution map of genus Palinustus from GBIF (accessed 14 April 2025)

Species of this genus are generally distributed across deep-water equatorial contexts, making their distribution patterns similar to fellow Palinuridae genera Puerulus, Justitia, and Linuparus. They mostly inhabit the deeper portions of rocky habitats and reef slopes at depths of 59-670m, making them hard to capture and sample when using traditional methods.

== Taxonomy ==
The genus Palinustus was first introduced in 1880 by Alphonse Milne-Edwards, a French carcinologist, along with the description of Palinustus truncatus, making it the type species of the genus.

The genus Palinustus comprises five recognised extant species.

Previously, an additional species in the genus, Palinustus phoberus, was described by de French malacologist and zoologist Alphonse Trémeau de Rochebrune in 1883. However, that has since been found to be a junior subjective synonym of the earlier described Panulirus regius (de Brito Capello, 1864), and is now accepted as the latter. Limited number of specimens due to difficulties in retrieving wild samples have been a key taxonomic problem, with specimens of ''Palinustus mossambicus'' and ''Palinustus waguensis'' having been confused for one another in the past. ''Palinustus unicornutus'' has also been previously recognised as a variation of Palinustus waguensis in the past, but are now recognised as discrete species.

Image	Scientific name	Common name	Distribution	IUCN status
-	Palinustus holthuisi Chan & Yu, 1995	-	Taiwan and Japan	DD
-	Palinustus mossambicus Barnard, 1926	Buffalo blunthorn lobster	Mozambique and Somalia	DD
	Palinustus truncatus A. Milne-Edwards, 1880	American blunthorn lobster	Western Atlantic: Grenadines, The Guianas, the mouth of the Amazon River, Brazil	LC
-	Palinustus unicornutus Berry, 1979	Unicorn blunthorn lobster	Indo-west Pacific: South Africa (east coast), Glorioso Islands, La Reunion Island, Comoro Islands, Japan, Indonesia, New Caledonia, Taiwan, the Philippines, French Polynesia	LC
	Palinustus waguensis Kubo, 1963	Japanese blunthorn lobster	Indo-west Pacific: Japan, Thailand, Southwest India, Andaman Islands	LC
