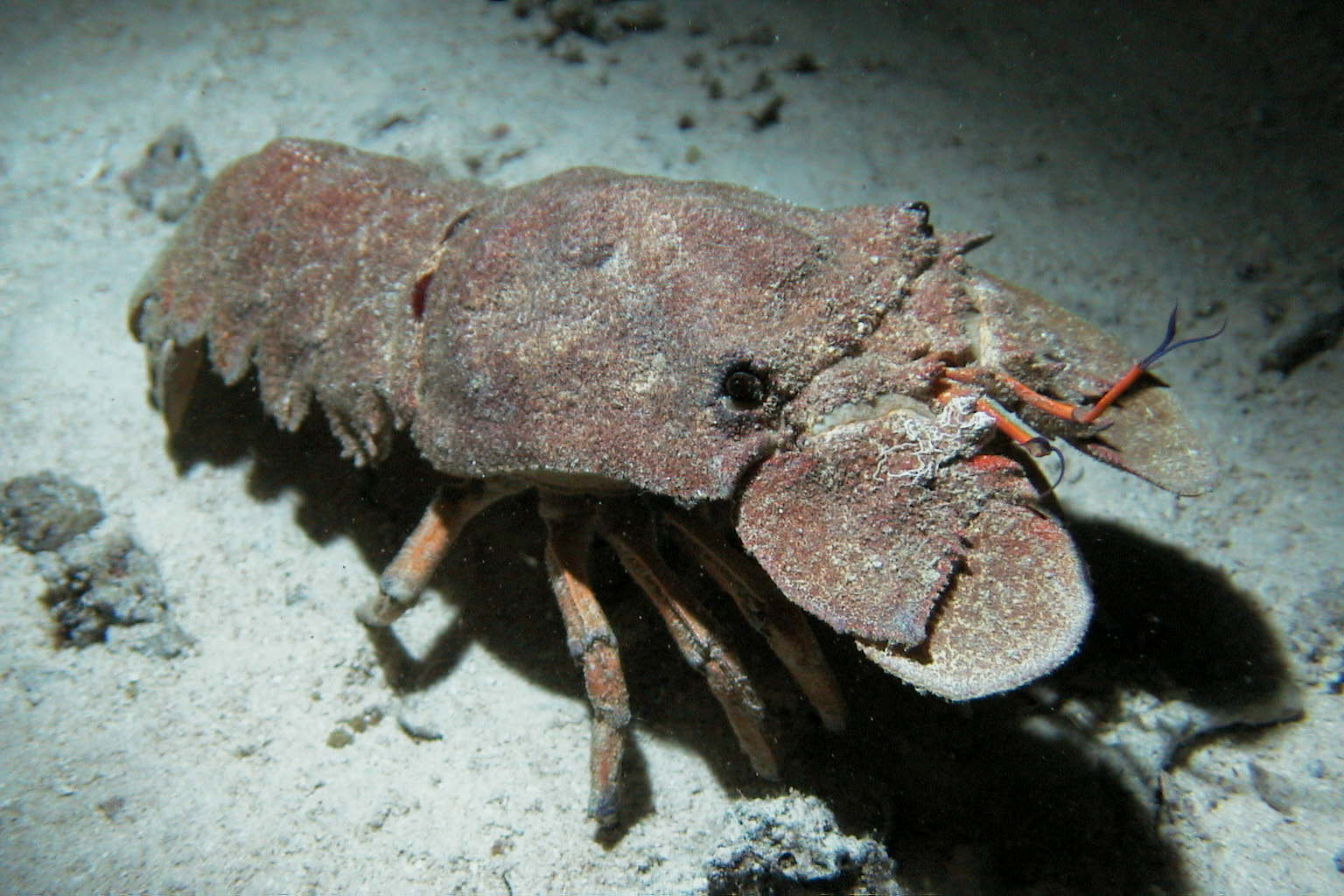

Conservation status
- Data Deficient (IUCN 3.1)

Scientific classification
- Kingdom: Animalia
- Phylum: Arthropoda
- Clade: Pancrustacea
- Class: Malacostraca
- Order: Decapoda
- Suborder: Pleocyemata
- Family: Scyllaridae
- Genus: Scyllarides
- Species: S. latus

Binomial name
- Scyllarides latus (Latreille, 1802)

Synonyms
- Scyllarus latus Latreille, 1802; Pseudibacus veranyi Guérin-Méneville, 1855

= Scyllarides latus =

Species of crustacean

Scyllarides latus, the Mediterranean slipper lobster, is a species of slipper lobster found in the Mediterranean Sea and in the eastern Atlantic Ocean. It is edible and highly regarded as food, but is now rare over much of its range due to overfishing. Adults may grow to 1 foot (30 cm) long, are camouflaged, and have no claws. They are nocturnal, emerging from caves and other shelters during the night to feed on molluscs. As well as being eaten by humans, S. latus is also preyed upon by a variety of bony fish. Its closest relative is S. herklotsii, which occurs off the Atlantic coast of West Africa; other species of Scyllarides occur in the western Atlantic Ocean and the Indo-Pacific. The larvae and young animals are largely unknown.

== Taxonomy ==
Scyllarides latus was originally classified in the genus Scyllarus, along with the four other slipper lobsters known at the time (Scyllarus arctus, Scyllarides aequinoctialis, Thenus orientalis and Arctides guineensis). Separate genera were first introduced by William Elford Leach in 1815, namely Thenus and Ibacus. In 1849, Wilhem de Haan divided the genus Scyllarus into two genera, Scyllarus and Arctus, but made the error of including the type species of Scyllarus in the genus Arctus. This was first recognised by the ichthyologist Theodore Gill in 1898, who synonymised Arctus with Scyllarus, and erected a new genus Scyllarides to hold the species that De Haan had placed in Scyllarus. Scyllarides is placed in the subfamily Arctidinae, which is differentiated from other subfamilies by the presence of multiarticulated exopods on all three maxillipeds, and a three-segmented palp on the mandible. The only other genus in the subfamily, Arctides, is distinguished by having a more highly sculptured carapace, with an extra spine behind each eye, and a transverse groove on the first segment of the abdomen.

The only other species of Scyllarides to occur in the Eastern Atlantic is Scyllarides herklotsii, which differs from S. latus mostly in the ornamentation on the carapace; while in S. latus the tubercles (lumps projecting from the surface) are high and pronounced, they are lower and more rounded in S. herklotsii.

=== Type specimen ===
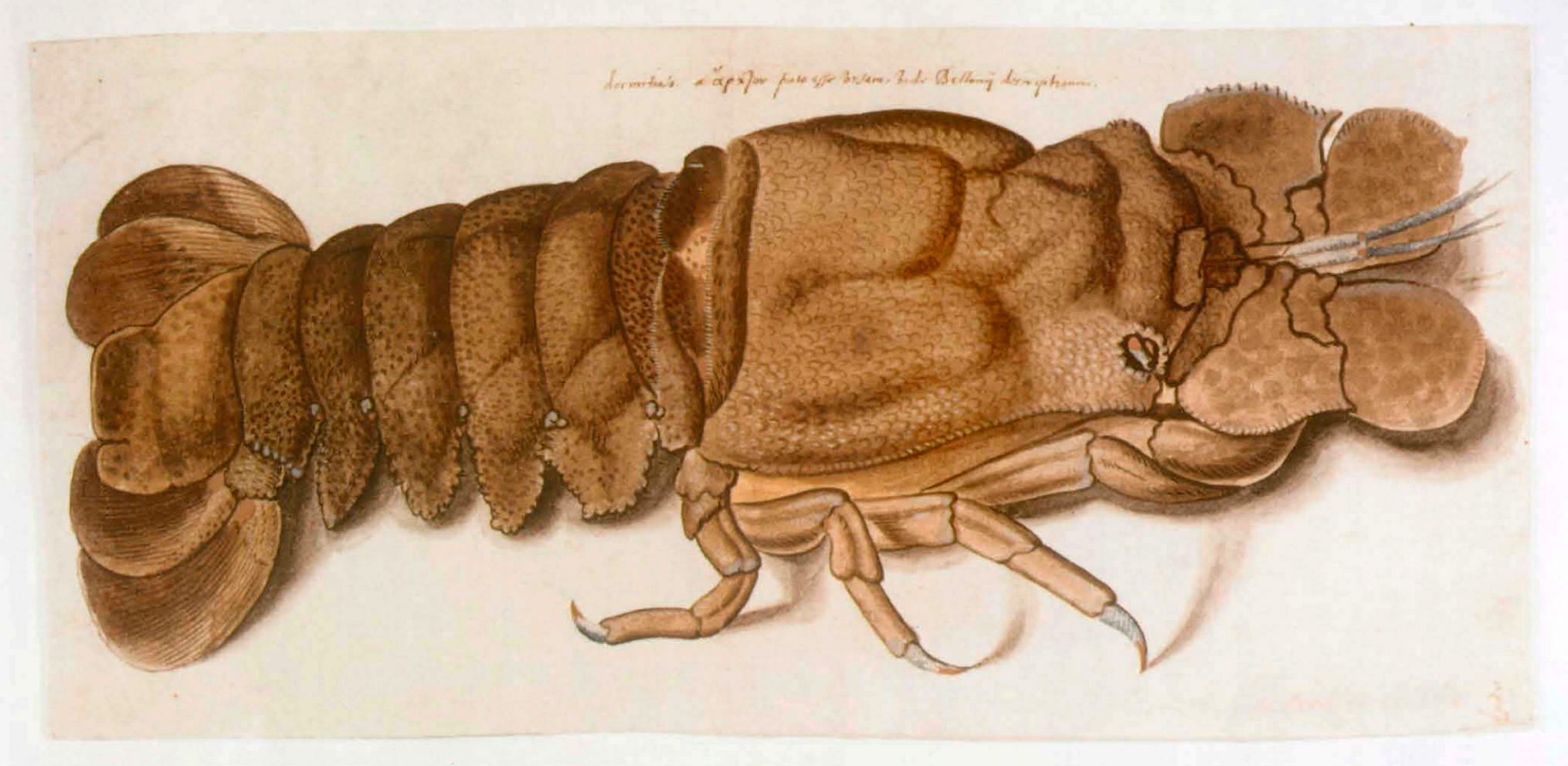
The type specimen of Scyllarides latus was painted by Cornelius Sittardus, and reproduced in Conrad Gesner's Historiae animalium.

The type locality given by Pierre André Latreille in his original description of the species was simply "Mediterranée" (Mediterranean Sea), without designating a type specimen. Lipke Holthuis later chose a lectotype for the species, which was the animal illustrated by Cornelius Sittardus, and published in Conrad Gesner's Historiae animalium in 1558 (book 4, p. 1097). This illustration, originally a watercolour but reproduced by Gesner in a woodcut, had been mentioned by Latreille in his description as being particularly fine, and is all that remains of the type specimen. Given that Sittardus was working in Rome at the time, it is likely that the type specimen was a fresh specimen from the Tyrrhenian Sea near Rome.

== Distribution ==
Scyllarus latus is found along most of the coast of the Mediterranean Sea (one exception being the northern Adriatic Sea), and in parts of the eastern Atlantic Ocean from near Lisbon in Portugal south to Senegal, including the islands of Madeira, the Azores, the Selvagens Islands and the Cape Verde Islands. In Senegal, it occurs together with a related species Scyllarides herklotsii, which it closely resembles.

== Description ==
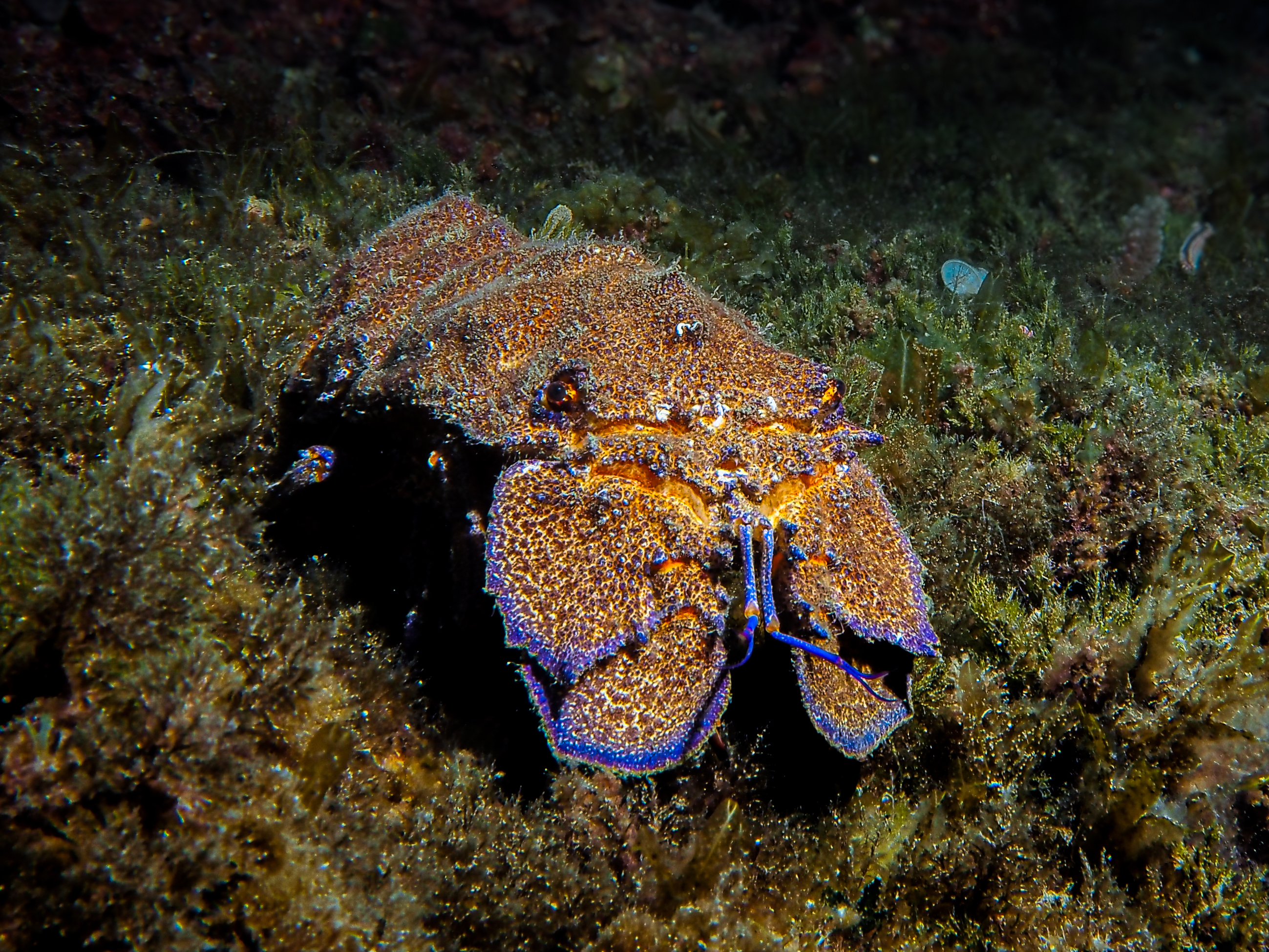
In Malta

S. latus can grow to a total body length about 45 centimetres (18 in), although rarely more than 30 cm (12 in). This is equivalent to a carapace length of up to 12 cm (4.7 in). An individual may weigh as much as 1.5 kilograms (3.3 lb). As in all slipper lobsters, the second pair of antennae are enlarged and flattened into "shovels" or "flippers". Despite the name "lobster", slipper lobsters such as Scyllarides latus have no claws, and nor do they have the protective spines of spiny lobsters. Instead, the exoskeleton, and particularly the carapace, are thicker than in clawed lobsters and spiny lobsters, acting as resilient armour. Adults are cryptically coloured, and the carapace is covered in conspicuous, high tubercles.

== Ecology ==
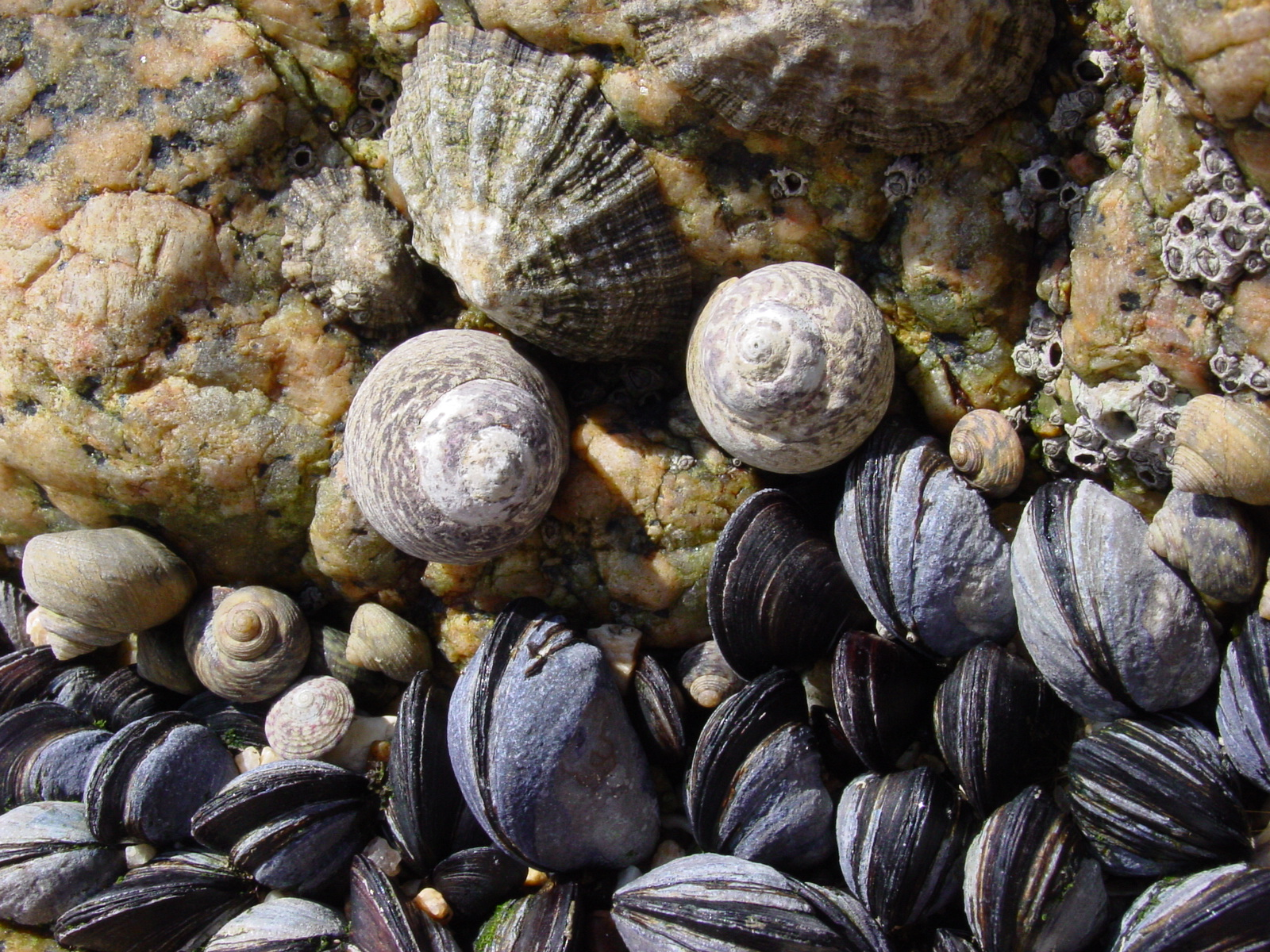
Limpets, gastropods and mussels are all eaten by Scyllarides latus.

=== Substrate ===
S. latus lives on rocky or sandy substrates at depths of 4–100 metres (13–328 ft). They shelter during the day in natural dens, on the ceilings of caves, or in reefs, preferring situations with more than one entrance or exit.

=== Diet ===
The diet of S. latus consists generally of molluscs. The preferred prey is, according to different sources, either limpets or bivalves. The prey, which S. latus can detect even under 3.5 cm (1.4 in) of sediment, is opened by careful use of the strong pointed pereiopods. They will also eat oysters and squid, but not sea urchins or muricid snails. They eat more in warmer seasons, getting through 3.2 oysters per day in July, but only 0.2 oysters per day in January.

=== Predators ===
The most significant predator of S. latus is the grey triggerfish, Balistes capriscus, although a number of other fish species have also been reported to prey on S. latus, including dusky groupers (Epinephelus guaza), combers (Serranus spp.), Mediterranean rainbow wrasse (Coris julis), red groupers (Epinephelus morio) and gag groupers (Mycteroperca microlepis). An Octopus vulgaris has been observed to eat S. latus in an artificial setting, but it is unclear whether S. latus is preyed on by octopuses in nature.

== Life cycle ==
Male Scyllarus latus carry spermatophores at the base of the last two pairs of pereiopods in April. Fertilisation has not been observed in this species, but most reptant decapods mate with the ventral surfaces together. Between July and August, females carry around 100,000 eggs on their enlarged, feathery pleopods. The eggs develop from being a bright orange colour to a dark brown before being shed into the water after around 16 days of development. There is normally only one generation per year.

The larvae are much less well known than the adults. An initial 1.3 millimetres (0.05 in) long naupliosoma stage, which swims using its antennae, moults into the first of eleven phyllosoma stages, which swim using their thoracic legs. The last phyllosoma stage may reach a size of 48 mm (1.9 in) and can be up to 11 months old; most of the intermediate phyllosoma stages have not been observed. A single nisto (juvenile has been recorded, having been caught off Reggio Calabria in 1900, but only recognised as being a juvenile S. latus in 2009. Young adults are also rare; a museum specimen with a carapace length of 34 mm (1.3 in) is the smallest adult yet observed. Adults moult annually, and probably migrate to cooler waters with a temperature of 13–18 °C (55–64 °F) to do so. The old exoskeleton softens over a period of 10–22 days before being shed, and the new, pale exoskeleton takes around three weeks to harden completely. Smaller individuals typically gain weight over the course of a moult, but this difference is less pronounced in larger animals.

== Behaviour ==
Scyllarides latus is mostly nocturnal in the wild, since most of its predators are diurnal. While sheltering, S. latus tends to be gregarious, with several individuals sharing the same shelter. When confronted with a predator, S. latus has no claws or spines to repel the predator, and instead either clings to the substrate, or swims away with powerful flexion of the abdomen, or "tail-flips". Larger lobsters can exert a stronger grip than smaller ones, with a force of up to 150 newtons (equivalent to a weight of 15 kilograms or 33 pounds) required to dislodge the largest individuals.

Predator avoidance may also explain the frequent behaviour where S. latus will carry food items back to a shelter before consuming them. When two S. latus individuals compete for a food item, they may use the enlarged second antennae to flip their opponent over, by wedging the antennae underneath the opponent's body and quickly raising them. An alternative strategy is to grip an opponent and begin the tail-flipping movement, or to engage in a tug of war.

== Human consumption ==
S. latus is edible, but it is a relatively rare species, and is therefore of little interest to fisheries. However, it is caught in small numbers throughout its distribution, mostly in trammel nets, by trawling and in lobster pots. An annual catch of 2,000–3,000 kg (4,400–6,600 lb) has been reported for Israel. Catching by hand has become increasingly frequent, since the advent of SCUBA diving made the animal's habitat more accessible to humans. This may have affected population sizes of S. latus in some areas.
