= Linuparus meridionalis =

Scientific classification
- Kingdom: Animalia
- Phylum: Arthropoda
- Class: Malacostraca
- Order: Decapoda
- Suborder: Pleocyemata
- Family: Palinuridae
- Genus: Linuparus
- Species: L. meridionalis

Binomial name
- Linuparus meridionalis Tsoi, Cham & Chu, 2011

Species of crustacean

Linuparus meridionalis is a species of spiny lobster in the genus Linuparus. It lives on the sea floor around Australia, New Caledonia and parts of Indonesia, at depths of 71–315 m (233–1,033 ft). Formerly considered part of L. trigonus, it was recognised as a separate species in 2011, based on variation in colouration, and subtle morphological differences.

== Distribution and ecology ==
Linuparus meridionalis is found in at depths of 71–315 metres (233–1,033 ft) around the northern and eastern coasts of Australia, off New Caledonia, and among the Indonesian Tanimbar Islands. L. meridionalis is benthic (lives on the sea floor), and feeds on various molluscs, crustaceans and other invertebrates. Females may carry eggs at any time from February to October.

== Description ==
Linuparus meridionalis males grow to a carapace length of 125 millimetres (4.9 in), with females only slightly smaller, at 122 mm (4.8 in). The body is "generally half brownish red and half white". The second to fifth somites of the abdomen are generally white, at least in the posterior half.

== Taxonomy ==
Until 2011, L. meridionalis was considered part of L. trigonus. Doubts were expressed as early as 1967 that the two populations belonged to the same species, but no convincing character could be found to separate them. In 2011, it was formally described as a separate species by scientists from Hong Kong and Taiwan, and was given the specific epithet meridionalis, meaning "southern", since the new species occurs only in the Southern Hemisphere. L. meridionalis is separated from L. trigonus by the pattern of colours on the body, and by subtle differences in the shape of the sternum. The other two extant species of Linuparus are less closely related.
