= Justitia mauritiana =

Scientific classification
- Kingdom: Animalia
- Phylum: Arthropoda
- Class: Malacostraca
- Order: Decapoda
- Suborder: Pleocyemata
- Family: Palinuridae
- Genus: Justitia
- Species: J. mauritiana

Binomial name
- Justitia mauritiana (Miers, 1882)

Synonyms
- Palinurus longimanus mauritianus Miers, 1882; Justitia longimana mauritiana Holthuis, 1946

Species of crustacean

Justitia mauritiana is a species of spiny lobster, sometimes called the gibbon furrow lobster. It lives in the western Indian Ocean around the Mascarene Islands (Réunion and the type locality, Mauritius), and also around the Hawaiian Islands. Larvae supposed to belong to this species have been reported around the Philippines, the Gilbert Islands and Tahiti. It grows to a total body length of 16 centimetres (6.3 in), and this small size, together with its scarcity and the difficulties of fishing for lobsters on rocky substrates, means that the species is not commercially exploited. J. mauritiana is also treated as a subspecies of Justitia longimanus.
