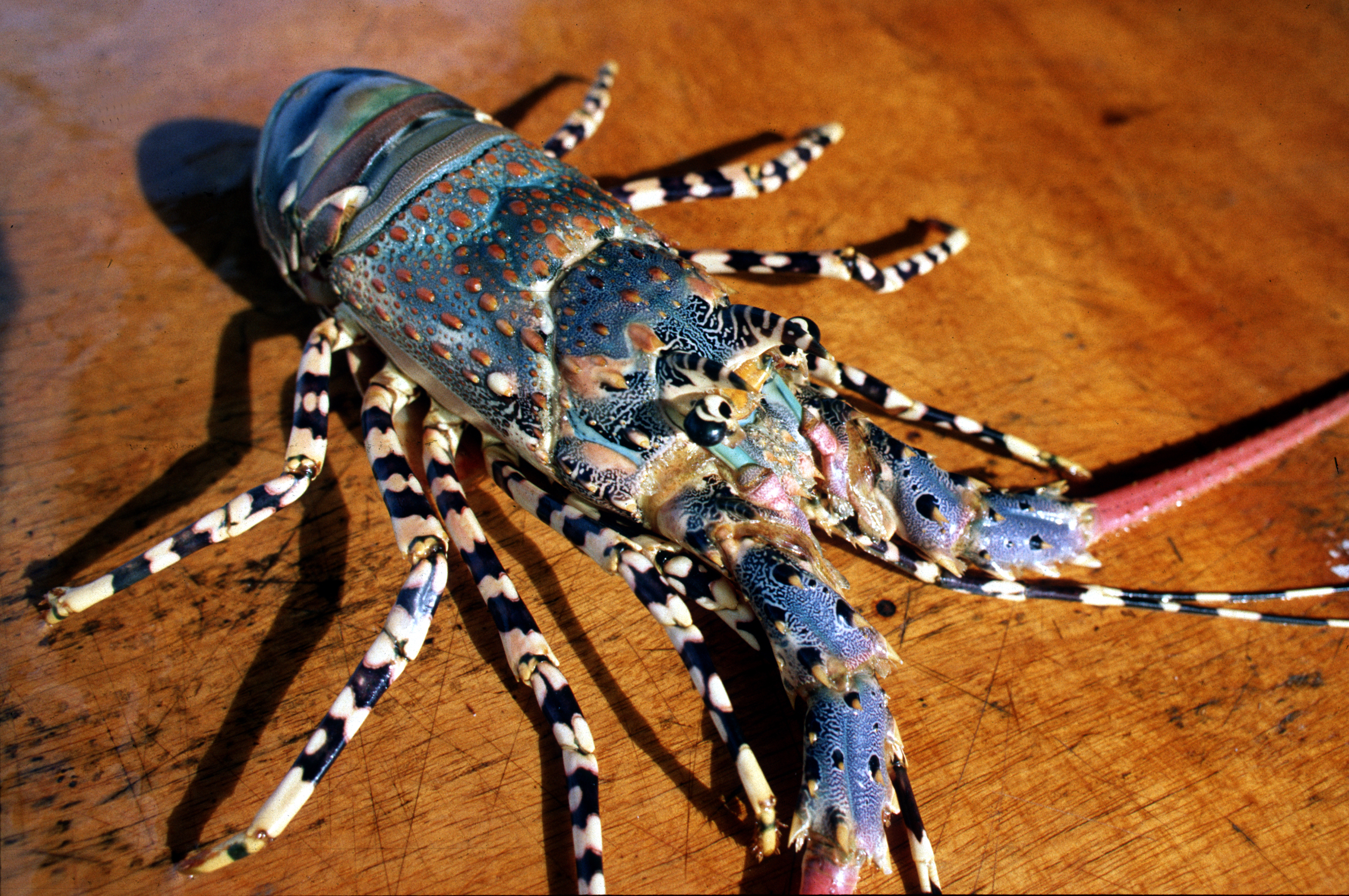

Conservation status
- Least Concern (IUCN 3.1)

Scientific classification
- Kingdom: Animalia
- Phylum: Arthropoda
- Clade: Pancrustacea
- Class: Malacostraca
- Order: Decapoda
- Suborder: Pleocyemata
- Family: Palinuridae
- Genus: Panulirus
- Species: P. ornatus

Binomial name
- Panulirus ornatus (Fabricius, 1798)

Synonyms
- Palinurus ornatus Fabricius, 1798; Palinurus sulcatus H. Milne-Edwards, 1837; Panulirus sulcatus White, 1847; Palinurus (Senex) sulcatus Pfeffer, 1881; Senex ornatus Lanchester, 1900

= Panulirus ornatus =

Species of crustacean

Panulirus ornatus (known by a number of common names, including tropical rock lobster, ornate rock lobster, ornate spiny lobster and ornate tropical rock lobster) is a large spiny lobster with 11 larval stages.

Panulirus ornatus has a wide geographical range in the Indo-Pacific, from the Red Sea and KwaZulu-Natal in the west to Japan and Fiji in the east. These lobsters can be found at shallow depths, typically no deeper than 50 m. In most parts of its range, the lobster is netted or speared, while in Northeast Australia, a commercial fishery has existed since 1966 and the harvesting of the species is regulated by the Great Barrier Reef Marine Park Authority. The species now also occurs in the Mediterranean, having invaded as a Lessepsian migrant through the Suez Canal.

The species is responsible for supporting a number of fisheries in Vietnam, Papua New Guinea, the Torres Strait in Australia, and other Indo-Pacific regions. With such stress on a single species for commercial purposes, countries like Australia and Indonesia have started successful aquaculture practices.

== Description ==
The ornate rock lobster is a large specimen with a blue-green carapace. It is characterized by its large frontal horns, as well as distinct patterning with stripes and spots of various colors throughout its body. Its walking legs have intricate stripe patterns, making it appear almost spider-like.

== Diet ==
The P. ornatus diet consists of a variety of invertebrates, from bivalves to gastropods and even other small crustaceans. These lobsters depend on carotenoids for energy as well as other functional benefits, including reproductive success, post-larval development, antioxidants, and even stress resistance. Many of these lobster species rely on crustacean feeds upon breeding in an aquaculture facility. Within these feeds, one of the most components is carotenoids, specifically astaxanthin. Many feeds also rely on nutrients from blue and green-lipped mussels, but experiments have shown that the carotenoid level offered from these feeds alone is not sufficient for the lobsters' development.

== Breeding and migration ==
Panulirus ornatus migrates annually from the Torres Strait to Yule Island in the Gulf of Papua in order to breed. Migration begins in mid to late August, during which ovary development, mating, and initial oviposition occur. Larval release occurs when the Panulirus ornatus population ends migration and arrives on the reefs of the eastern seaboard of the Gulf of Papua.

The breeding season for Panulirus ornatus stretches from November to March or April. After migration to the Gulf of Papua, the sexes segregate by water depth. Males enter shallower water and females enter deeper water until the eggs have hatched. Female Panulirus ornatus produce up to three broods with a reduction in size of each subsequent brood.

Most breeding adults are three years old. Mating males tend to be larger than females, with carapace lengths ranging from 100–150 mm, and that of females ranging from 90–120 mm. After breeding, there is high mortality in breeding adults.

There is no return migration of breeding adults. Reproductive migration across the Gulf of Papua occurs in order to disperse larvae in oceanic currents that favor their distribution near the Torres Strait. Dispersed throughout the eastern coast of Australia, Panulirus ornatus larvae must migrate as juveniles to the adult habitat in the northern Torres Strait. From there, they remain in specific reef complex for 1–2 years until they are of breeding age and undertake the annual mass migration to breed.

== Aquaculture/farming ==
The reason behind the wide cultivation of P. ornatus in aquaculture is because of its fast growing nature and it generally attains 1 kg in about 18 months. Individuals larger than 1 kg possess greater commercial value. Hence, formulated feed pellets have been used by many countries in Southeast Asia such as Vietnam and the Philippines in their aquaculture programs.

=== Seed lobsters (pueruli) ===
Selling wild-caught, out-grown rock lobster originated in countries like Vietnam and China. In the early 2000s, it was discovered that the waters surrounding Indonesia hosted the largest P. ornatus communities ever seen and therefore, Indonesia had the potential to host the world's largest lobster aquaculture industry. P. ornatus is now the most valuable resource in Indonesian fisheries.

These lobsters are extremely abundant, specifically in their puerulus stage: the transition stage between phyllosoma larva and juvenile lobster. This is also when they can be referred to as 'seed lobsters.' Pueruli are much more abundant than juveniles, so it is extremely efficient to gather members of this group. Fishers dive down to artificial habitats created specifically for pueruli settlement and manually remove them periodically. These specimens then are moved to grow-out sectors to mature for industry purposes. This is a mutually beneficial practice, as humans are able to export (and eat) large sums of P. ornatus, and meanwhile this species is subjected to much lower mortality rates in the process. In nature, pueruli mortality rates are about 99%, whereas in capture and on-grown practices, the mortality rate is lowered to under 25%. Hence, aquaculture practices are providing ways of increased lobster production and enhancing natural populations.

Many government officials do not recognize the mutual benefits of this practice and have implemented regulations in an attempt to increase already-stable populations of adult lobsters. In 2015, a law was put into place ending the practice of seed fishing, as it required all caught lobsters weigh at least 200 g. Later, in 2016, a new policy was announced that prohibited grow-out opportunities for lobsters. At this point, lobster seed fishing had been providing livelihood to thousands of Indonesian households for years. These practices then continued in secret, as fishers risked major penalty and arrest. In 2019, it was estimated that there were more puerulus fishers active than there had been before the new laws were implemented.

== See also ==
- Panulirus cygnus, the "western rock lobster"
- Jasus edwardsii, the "southern rock lobster"
- Spiny lobster culture in Vietnam
