= Fishing industry in Puerto Rico =

Fishing industry of the US territory of Puerto Rico

As a Caribbean island, Puerto Rico relies on the fishing industry. In 2018, according to the Puerto Rico Planning Board, local fisheries contributed about $300,000 to the island's economy. Historically, there has been a significant amount of commercially important fish—as well as shellfish, particularly spiny lobsters—within coastal Puerto Rican waters.

However Caribbean fish resources are among the most overexploited in the world, with 55% of overexploited commercial fishery populations as of 2020, according to the Food and Agriculture Organization.

Small-scale fisheries and villages have been heavily affected by Hurricane Maria and the COVID-19 pandemic. According to Miguel Ortiz, president of Guayama Fishing Village and the Commercial Fishermen Federation of Puerto Rico, they reportedly lost all kinds of equipment and in 2021 the village was operating at 35-40% capacity. Before Maria there were some 44 fishing villages, of which in January 2021 there were approximately 20 operating at a full or part time capacity. Prior to the hurricane the kiosk in the Guayama Fishing Village could generate about $70,000 a year, while it is currently generating a little over half that amount, an example of how severely Hurricane Maria has damaged the fishing industry.
