= Scyllarides haanii =

Conservation status
- Least Concern (IUCN 3.1)

Scientific classification
- Kingdom: Animalia
- Phylum: Arthropoda
- Clade: Pancrustacea
- Class: Malacostraca
- Order: Decapoda
- Suborder: Pleocyemata
- Family: Scyllaridae
- Genus: Scyllarides
- Species: S. haanii

Binomial name
- Scyllarides haanii (de Haan, 1841)

Synonyms
- Scyllarides haani Siebold; Scyllarus haanii de Haan, 1841 (basionym)

Species of crustacean

Scyllarides haanii, the Aesop slipper lobster, is a marine decapod crustean in the family Scyllaridae. Other common names include the humpbacked slipper lobster and the ridgeback slipper lobster.

== Description ==
Scyllarides haanii can grow to a maximum body length of 50.5 cm (20 in) but commonly range between 16 and 30 cm (6 and 12 in) in length. It is believed to be the largest of the Scyllarides species. It is a solitary species that shelters during the day and forages at night, primarily on a diet of bivalves.

== Distribution and habitat ==
Scyllarides haanii is a wide-ranging benthic species but nowhere abundant, and uncommon in some places. It is native to the Indo-Pacific region and known to occur in the eastern and western Indian Ocean and throughout the Pacific Ocean. It is likely its distribution is larger than indicated in population assessments from 2013 and earlier.

Scyllarides haanii inhabits coral reefs and rocky bottoms in relatively warm coastal waters in winter to early spring, and migrates into deeper waters to breed. The species has been found at depths of 10–135 m (30–440 ft).

== Conservation ==
Scyllarides haanii is subject to some targeted fisheries, and is also a frequent by-catch in lobster fisheries, leading to some localized declines. However, due to its wide distribution and occurrence in at least one protection area where fishing is prohibited indefinitely, the species is currently classified as least concern by the IUCN.
