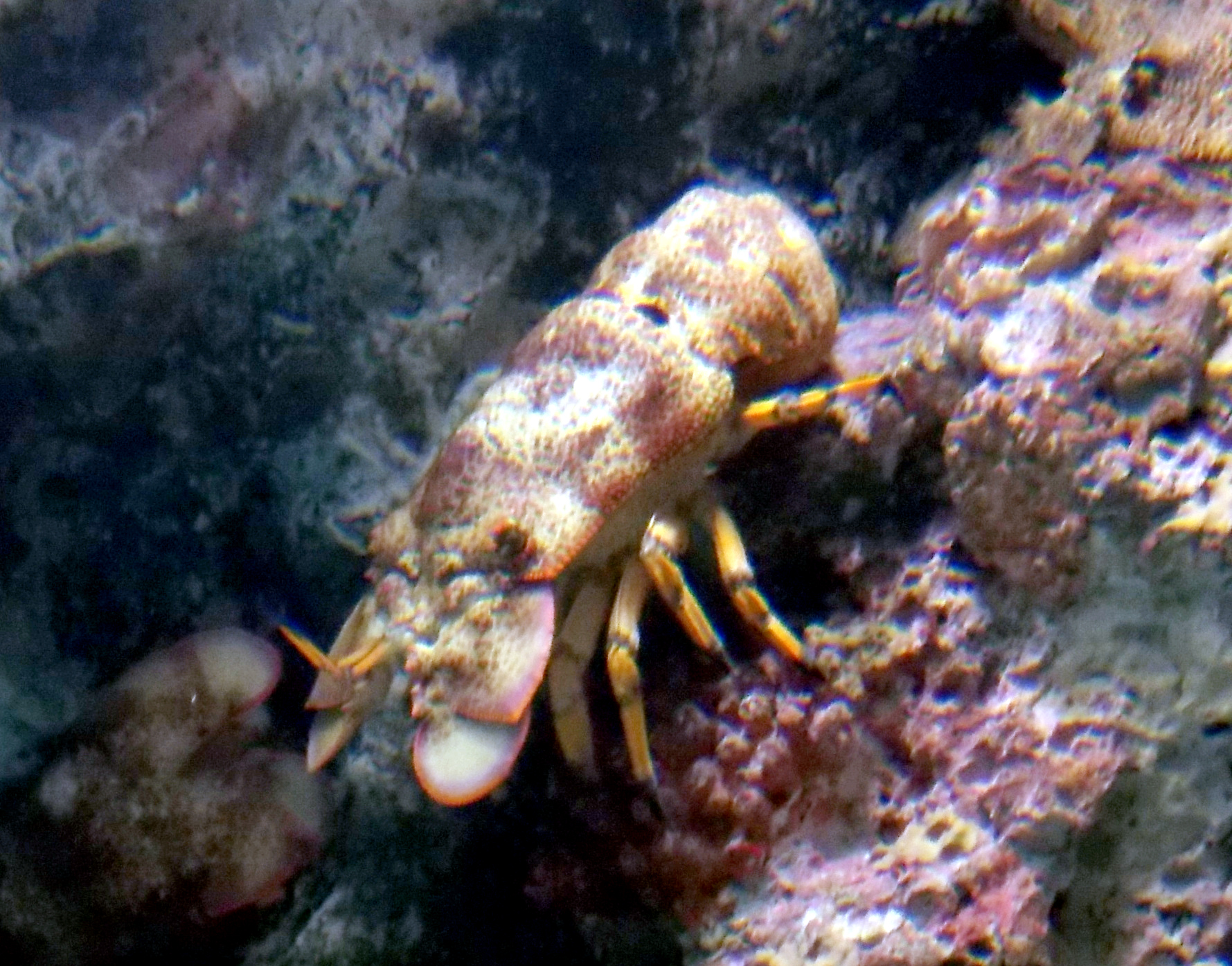

Scientific classification
- Kingdom: Animalia
- Phylum: Arthropoda
- Class: Malacostraca
- Order: Decapoda
- Suborder: Pleocyemata
- Family: Scyllaridae
- Genus: Scyllarides
- Species: S. squammosus

Binomial name
- Scyllarides squammosus (H. Milne-Edwards, 1837)

Synonyms
- Scyllarides sieboldi (De Haan, 1841); Scyllarus sieboldi De Haan, 1841; Scyllarus squammosus H. Milne-Edwards, 1837

= Scyllarides squammosus =

Species of crustacean

Scyllarides squammosus is a species of slipper lobster known as the blunt slipper lobster. It is found throughout the Indo-West Pacific region. Specifically its range is from Australia (Queensland, New South Wales, West Australia), Japan, Hawaii, Melanesia, New Caledonia to East Africa. Scyllarides squammosus has been found at depths from 7.5 m to 71 m.
