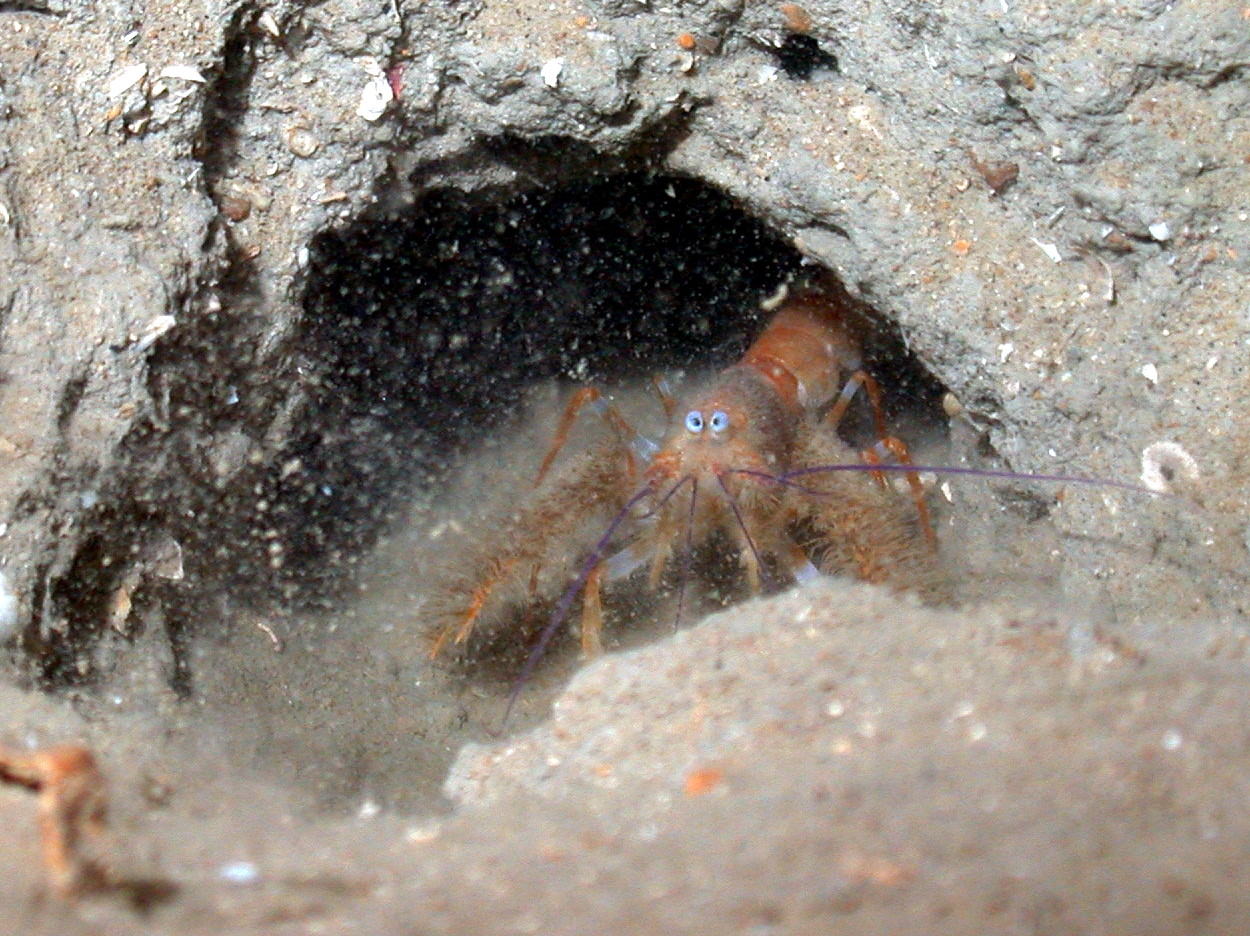
- Palinurellus gundlachi

Scientific classification
- Kingdom: Animalia
- Phylum: Arthropoda
- Clade: Pancrustacea
- Class: Malacostraca
- Order: Decapoda
- Suborder: Pleocyemata
- Infraorder: Achelata
- Family: Palinuridae

Groups included
- Palinurellus; Palibythus

= Furry lobster =

Family of crustaceans

Furry lobsters (sometimes called coral lobsters) are small decapod crustaceans, closely related to slipper lobsters and spiny lobsters. The antennae are not as enlarged as in spiny and slipper lobsters, and the body is covered in short hairs, hence the name furry lobster. Although previously considered a family in their own right (Synaxidae Spence Bate, 1881), the furry lobsters were subsumed into the family Palinuridae in 1990. Subsequent molecular phylogenetics studies have confirmed that the furry lobsters genera don't form a natural group and were both nested among the spiny lobster genera in family Palinuridae. That family now includes the two furry lobster genera and ten spiny lobster genera.

== Taxonomy ==
There are two genera, with three species between them:

- Phyllamphion elegans Reinhardt, 1849 – mole lobster, with an Indo-Pacific distribution
- Phyllamphion gundlachi (Von Martens, 1878) – Caribbean furry lobster, found in the Caribbean Sea and the Atlantic coast of South America; named for Juan Gundlach
- Palibythus magnificus P. J. F. Davie, 1990 – musical furry lobster, from the South Pacific (originally described from Samoa)
