= Scyllarides herklotsii =

Conservation status
- Data Deficient (IUCN 3.1)

Scientific classification
- Kingdom: Animalia
- Phylum: Arthropoda
- Clade: Pancrustacea
- Class: Malacostraca
- Order: Decapoda
- Suborder: Pleocyemata
- Family: Scyllaridae
- Genus: Scyllarides
- Species: S. herklotsii

Binomial name
- Scyllarides herklotsii (Herklots, 1851)

Synonyms
- Scyllarus herklotsii Herklots, 1851

Species of slipper lobster

Scyllarides herklotsii is a species of slipper lobster from the Atlantic coast West Africa. It is edible, but is not commercially fished, and is taken only by accident.

Scyllarides herklotsii was named in 1851 by Jan Adrian (or Janus Adrianus) Herklots in a doctoral thesis at the University of Leiden; the type material came from Butre, Ghana, and is stored at the Dutch Nationaal Natuurhistorisch Museum. The species is found from Senegal, where its range overlaps slightly with that of Scyllarides latus, south to Ponta do Pinda, Angola. It usually lives at depths of 5–70 metres (16–230 ft), but has been recorded from depths as great as 200 m (660 ft). It prefers sandy and rocky substrates.

Scyllarides herklotsii reaches a total length of 32 centimetres (13 in), but does not generally exceed 25 cm (9.8 in) long. It may be differentiated from S. latus by the lower, more rounded nature of the tubercles on the carapace.
