= Palibythus =

Palibythus magnificus

Conservation status
- Data Deficient (IUCN 3.1)

Scientific classification
- Kingdom: Animalia
- Phylum: Arthropoda
- Class: Malacostraca
- Order: Decapoda
- Suborder: Pleocyemata
- Family: Palinuridae
- Genus: Palibythus; Davie, 1990
- Species: P. magnificus

Binomial name
- Palibythus magnificus Davie, 1990

Genus of crustaceans

Palibythus magnificus, sometimes called the musical furry lobster, is a species of furry lobster found in Polynesia. It is generally included in the family Palinuridae, although it has also been separated from that family with the genus Palinurellus to form the family Synaxidae in the past. The species is known in Samoan as ula moana, a name which also covers the deep-water shrimp Heterocarpus laevigatus.

== Distribution ==
Palibythus is only known to occur around Samoa and the Tuamotu Archipelago. It lives at greater depth than Palinurellus – from 90 to 300 m (300–980 ft) – and is slightly larger, at up to 27 cm (11 in) in length. All the specimens held in natural history museums stem from the waters of Samoa, with only photos so far known of an animal from the Tuamotu Archipelago that is "almost definitely this species".

== Sound ==
Like other spiny lobsters (with the exception of the genera Jasus and Projasus), Palibythus is capable of making a loud screeching noise to distract or discourage potential predators. This is achieved by rubbing plectra at the base of the antennae against elongated "files" on the sides of the antennular plate.

== Relatives ==
Palibythus was originally placed with Palinurellus in the family Synaxidae, on the basis that both genera possess a triangular rostrum which is absent in the other genera of spiny lobsters, and that both genera lack the supra-orbital horns found in the other spiny lobster genera. Despite this, however, the two genera of furry lobsters are not sister taxa. The genera most closely related to Palibythus are Panulirus and Palinurus, while Palinurellus is closest to Jasus and Projasus, two other genera which lack the stridulating organ.

== Fishery ==
Although Palibythus is a large enough lobster to provide food for human consumption, its rarity, and the depths at which it lives, seem to preclude any commercial fishery.
