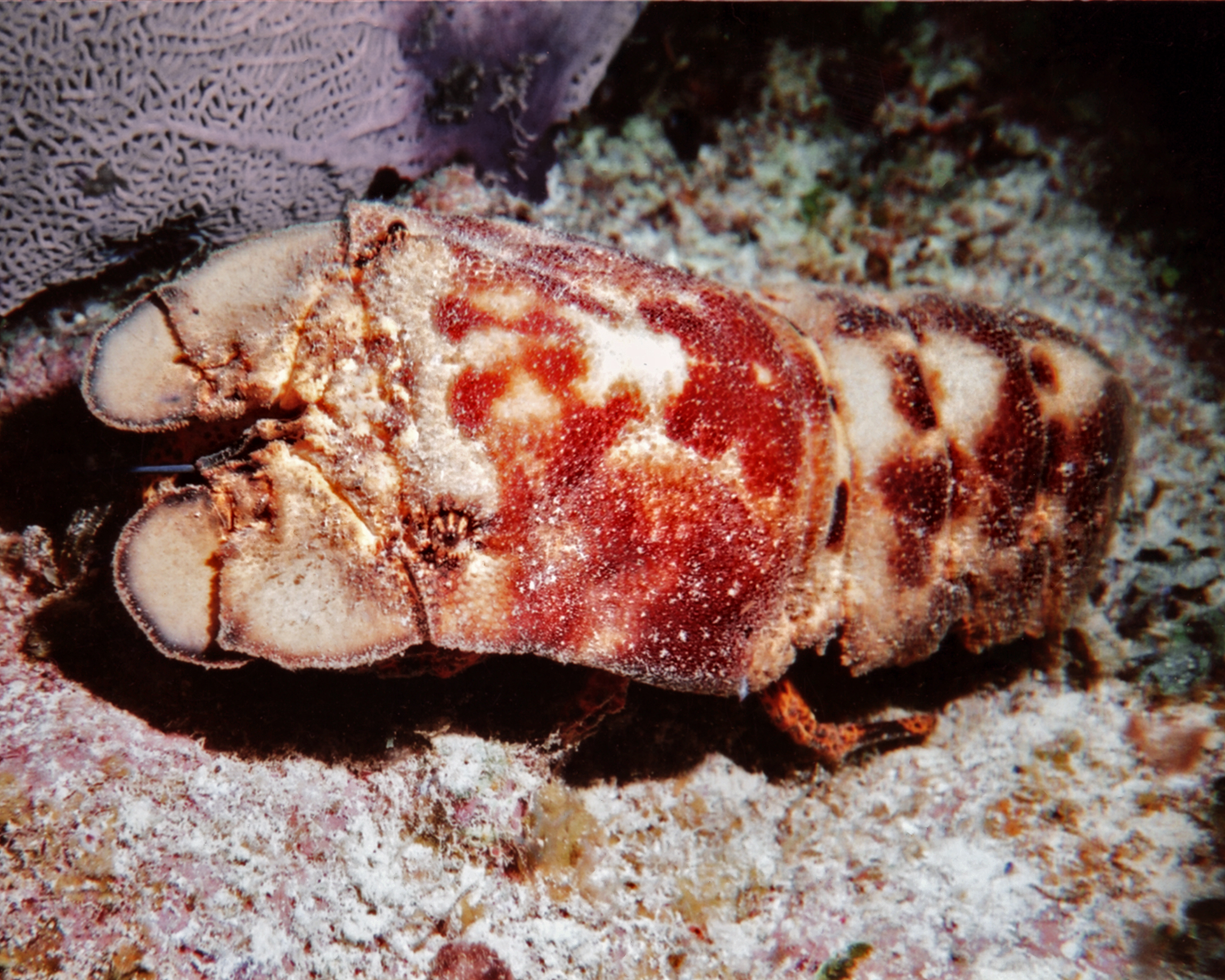

Conservation status
- Least Concern (IUCN 3.1)

Scientific classification
- Kingdom: Animalia
- Phylum: Arthropoda
- Class: Malacostraca
- Order: Decapoda
- Suborder: Pleocyemata
- Family: Scyllaridae
- Genus: Scyllarides
- Species: S. aequinoctialis

Binomial name
- Scyllarides aequinoctialis (Lund, 1793)

Synonyms
- Scyllarus aequinoctialis Lund, 1793; Pseudibacus gerstaeckeri Pfeffer, 1881

= Scyllarides aequinoctialis =

Species of crustacean

Scyllarides aequinoctialis is a species of slipper lobster that lives in the western Atlantic Ocean from South Carolina to São Paulo State, Brazil, including the Gulf of Mexico, Caribbean Sea, and Bermuda. Its common name is Spanish slipper lobster. It grows up to 30 centimetres (12 in) long, with a carapace 12 cm (4.7 in) long. S. aequinoctialis is the type species of the genus Scyllarides and the first species of slipper lobster to be described from the Western Atlantic.
