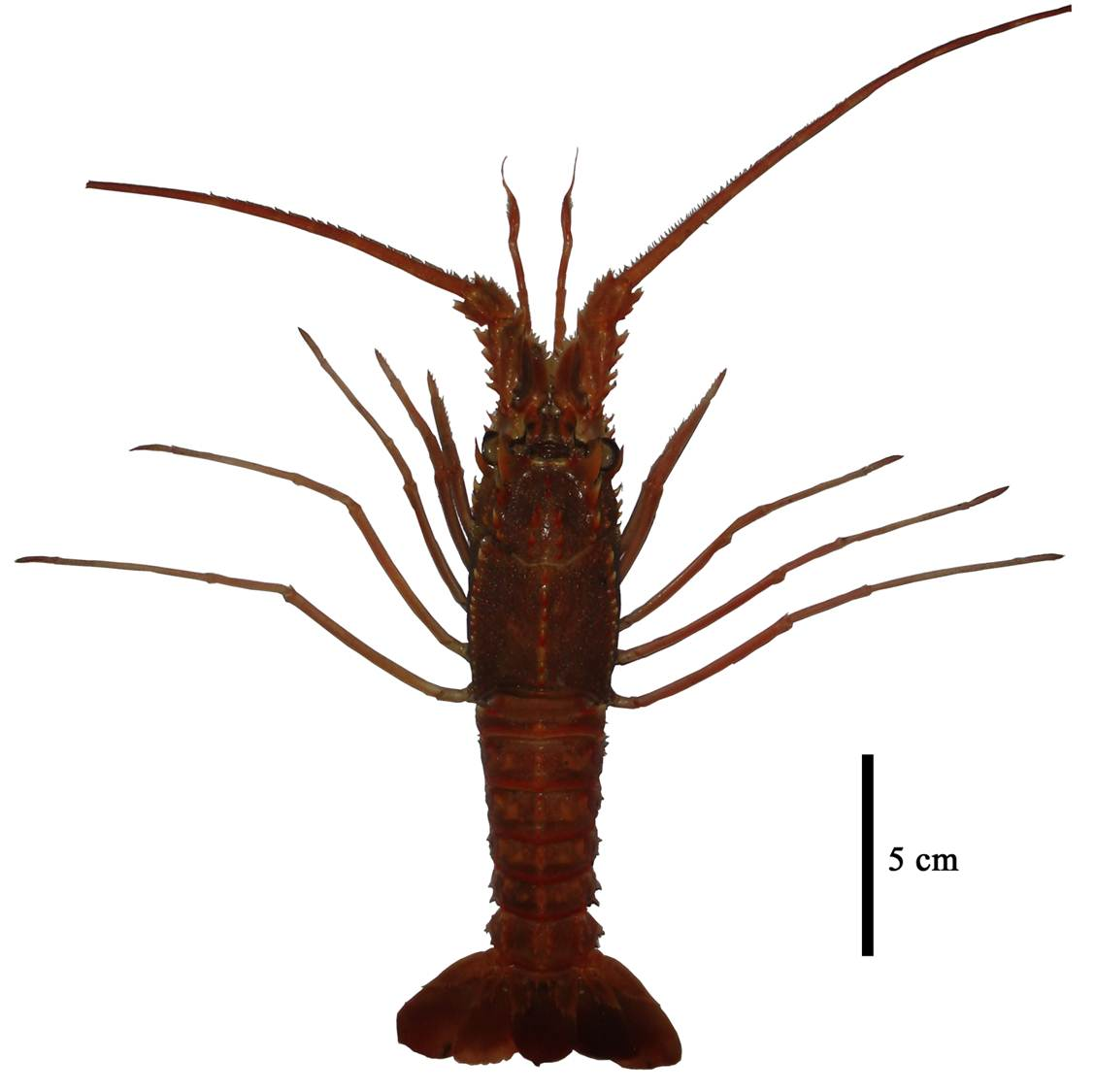
- Puerulus mesodontus

Scientific classification
- Kingdom: Animalia
- Phylum: Arthropoda
- Clade: Pancrustacea
- Class: Malacostraca
- Order: Decapoda
- Suborder: Pleocyemata
- Family: Palinuridae
- Genus: Puerulus; Ortmann, 1897

Type species
- Panulirus angulatus Bate, 1888

Species
- See text

= Puerulus (crustacean) =

Genus of crustaceans

Puerulus, commonly known as whip lobsters, is a genus of spiny lobsters in the family Palinuridae, native to the Indo-Pacific at depths of 200 to 700 meters.

== Species ==
- Puerulus angulatus Bate, 1888 (Holthuis 1991; Chan 2010) Banded whip lobster
- Puerulus carinatus Borradaile, 1910 Red whip lobster
- Puerulus gibbosus Chan, Ma & Chu, 2013
- Puerulus mesodontus Chan, Ma & Chu, 2013
- Puerulus quadridentis Chan, Ma & Chu, 2013
- Puerulus richeri Chan, Ma & Chu, 2013
- Puerulus sericus Chan, Ma & Chu, 2013
- Puerulus sewelli Ramadan, 1938 Arabian whip lobster
- Puerulus velutinus Holthuis, 1963 Velvet whip lobster
