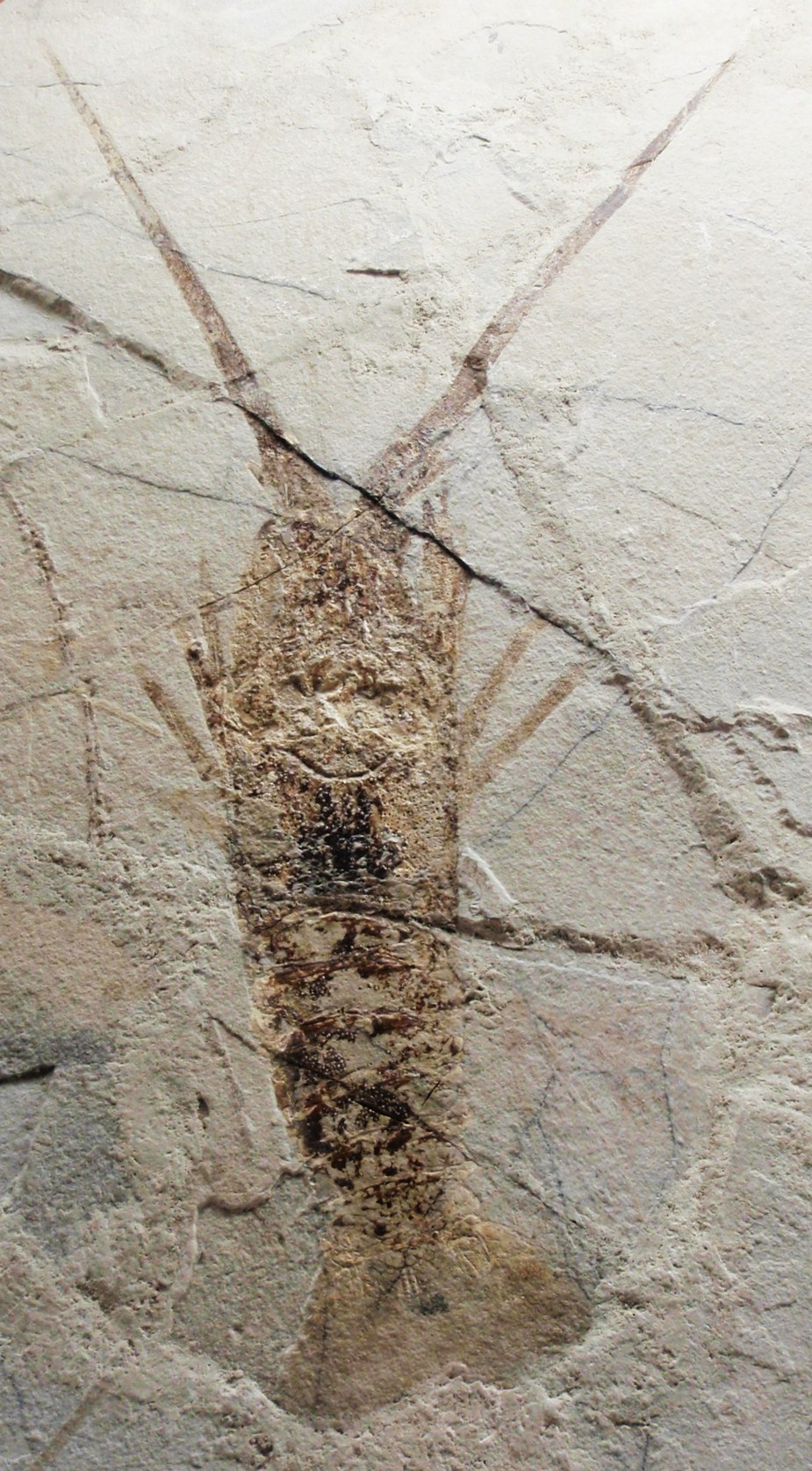
- Justitia desmaresti

Scientific classification
- Kingdom: Animalia
- Phylum: Arthropoda
- Class: Malacostraca
- Order: Decapoda
- Suborder: Pleocyemata
- Family: Palinuridae
- Genus: Justitia; Holthuis, 1946

Type species
- Palinurus longimanus H. Milne-Edwards, 1837

= Justitia (crustacean) =

Justitia Temporal range: Lutetian–Recent

Genus of spiny lobsters

Justitia is a genus of spiny lobsters. Following the recognition of Nupalirus as a separate genus, Justitia comprises one extant species and two fossil species:

- Justitia longimana (H. Milne-Edwards, 1837) – Recent

- Justitia longimana longimana (H. Milne-Edwards, 1837) – western Atlantic
- Justitia longimana mauritiana (Miers, 1882) – Indo-Pacific

- † Justitia desmaresti (Massalongo, 1854) – late Ypresian or early Lutetian, Monte Bolca, Italy
- † Justitia vicetina Beschin et al., 2001 – middle Lutetian, Chiampo, Vicenza, Italy
