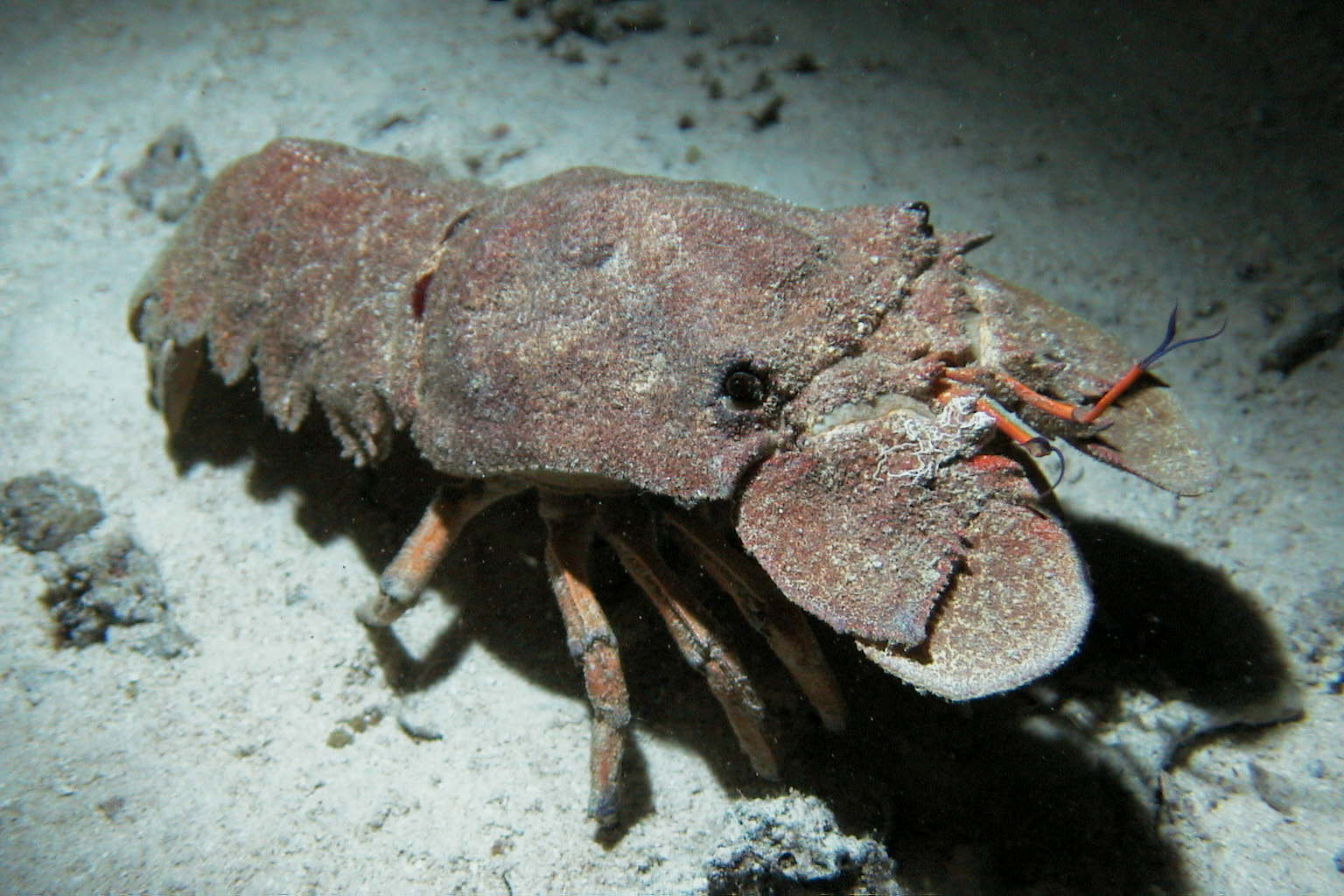
- Scyllarides latus

Scientific classification
- Kingdom: Animalia
- Phylum: Arthropoda
- Clade: Pancrustacea
- Class: Malacostraca
- Order: Decapoda
- Suborder: Pleocyemata
- Family: Scyllaridae
- Subfamily: Arctidinae
- Genus: Scyllarides; Gill, 1898

Type species
- Scyllarus aequinoctialis Lund, 1793

= Scyllarides =

Scyllarides Temporal range: Ypresian–Recent

Genus of crustaceans

Scyllarides is a genus of slipper lobsters.

== Characteristics ==
Scyllarides is placed in the subfamily Arctidinae, which is differentiated from other subfamilies by the presence of multiarticulated exopods on all three maxillipeds, and a three-segmented palp on the mandible. The only other genus in the subfamily, Arctides, is distinguished by having a more highly sculptured carapace, with an extra spine behind each eye, and a transverse groove on the first segment of the abdomen.

== Taxonomic history ==
In 1849, Wilhem de Haan divided the genus Scyllarus into two genera, Scyllarus and Arctus, but made the error of including the type species of Scyllarus in the genus Arctus. This was first recognised by the ichthyologist Theodore Gill in 1898, who synonymised Arctus with Scyllarus, and erected a new genus Scyllarides to hold the species that De Haan had placed in Scyllarus.

Three species of Scyllarides (S. astori, S. haanii, and S. squammosus) have been described in the North Pacific. However, DNA barcoding and morphological studies on the phyllosoma larvae collected in the western and central North Pacific suggested the existence of cryptic species.

== Species ==
Scyllarides comprises the following extant species:

- Scyllarides aequinoctialis (Lund, 1793)
- Scyllarides astori Holthuis, 1960
- Scyllarides brasiliensis Rathbun, 1906
- Scyllarides deceptor Holthuis, 1963
- Scyllarides delfosi Holthuis, 1960
- Scyllarides elisabethae (Ortmann, 1894)
- Scyllarides haanii (De Haan, 1841)
- Scyllarides herklotsii (Herklots, 1851)
- Scyllarides latus (Latreille, 1802)
- Scyllarides nodifer (Stimpson, 1866)
- Scyllarides obtusus Holthuis, 1993
- Scyllarides roggeveeni Holthuis, 1967
- Scyllarides squammosus (H. Milne-Edwards, 1837)
- Scyllarides tridacnophaga Holthuis, 1967

In addition, two extinct species of Scyllarides are known from the Eocene of Europe:

- Scyllarides bolcensis de Angeli & Garassino, 2008
- Scyllarides tuberculatus (König, 1825)
