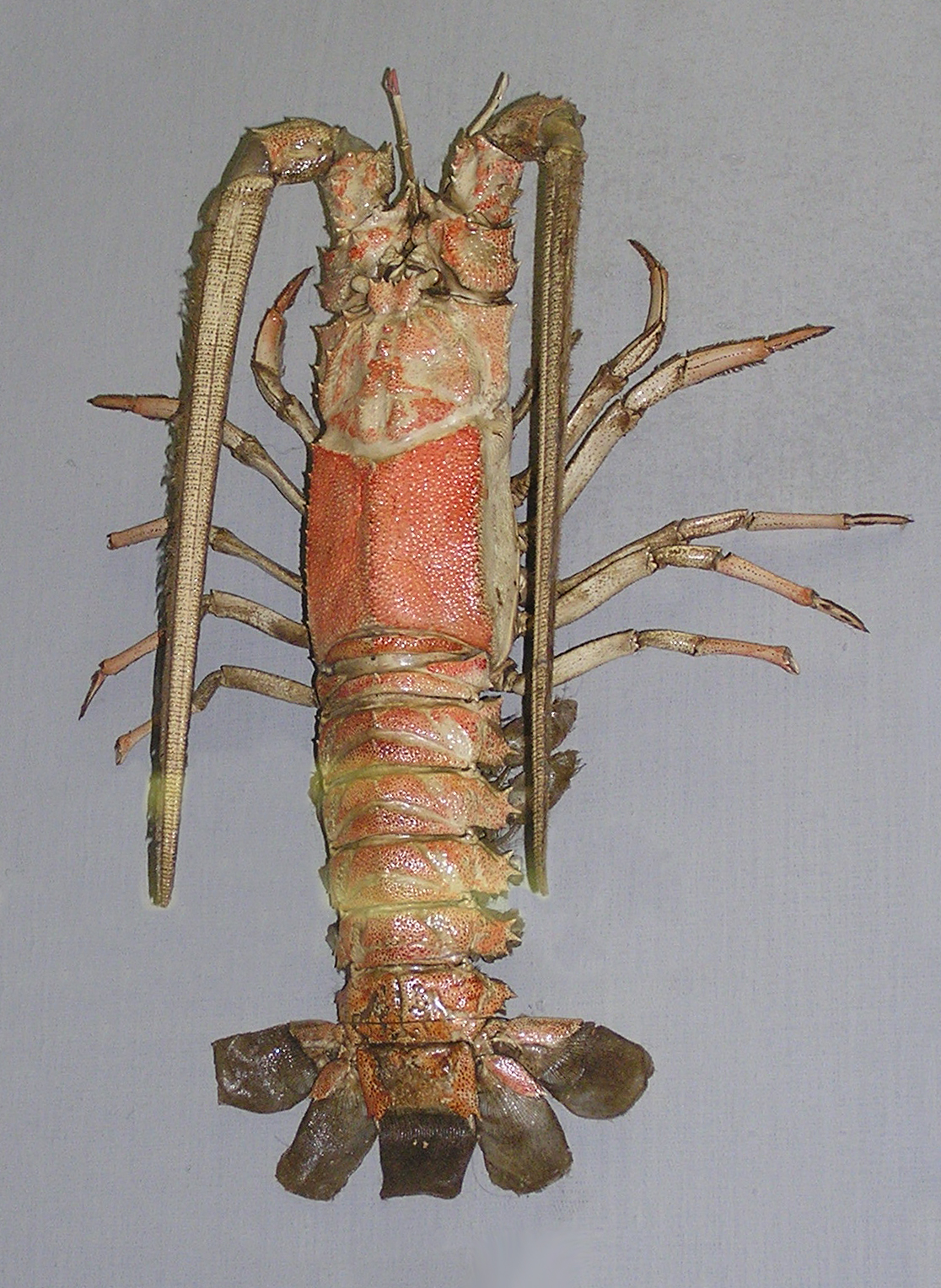
- Linuparus trigonus

Scientific classification
- Kingdom: Animalia
- Phylum: Arthropoda
- Clade: Pancrustacea
- Class: Malacostraca
- Order: Decapoda
- Suborder: Pleocyemata
- Family: Palinuridae
- Genus: Linuparus; White, 1847

Type species
- Palinurus trigonus von Siebold, 1824

= Linuparus =

Linuparus Temporal range: Aptian–Recent

Genus of crustaceans

Linuparus, the spear lobsters, is a genus of medium-sized to large spiny lobsters in the family Palinuridae. It contains four extant species found at depths of 30–500 m (100–1,640 ft) in the Indo-Pacific, and 32 fossil species, ranging from the Early Cretaceous to the Oligocene. L. trigonus is the only extant species also known from the fossil record.

== Extant species ==
- Linuparus meridionalis Tsoi, Chan & Chu, 2011
- Linuparus somniosus Berry & George, 1972
- Linuparus sordidus Bruce, 1965
- Linuparus trigonus (von Siebold, 1824)

== Extinct species ==
- Linpuarus adkinsi Rathbun, 1935
- Linpuarus africanus Glaessner, 1932
- Linpuarus bererensis Secretan, 1964
- Linpuarus bigranulatus Glaessner, 1930
- Linpuarus canadensis (Whiteaves, 1885)
- Linpuarus carteri (Reed, 1911)
- Linpuarus dentatus Van Straelen, 1936
- Linpuarus duelmenensis (Geinitz, 1849–50)
- Linpuarus dzheirantuiensis Feldmann et al., 2007
- Linpuarus eocenicus Woods, 1925
- Linpuarus euthymei (Roman & Mazeran 1920)
- Linpuarus grimmeri Stenzel, 1945
- Linpuarus hantscheli Mertin, 1941
- Linpuarus japonicus Nagao, 1931
- Linpuarus kleinfelderi Rathbun, 1931
- Linpuarus korura Feldmann & Bearlin, 1988
- Linpuarus laevicephalus Mertin, 1941
- Linpuarus macellarii Feldmann & Tshudy, 1988
- Linpuarus petkovici Benchmayer & Markovic, 1955
- Linpuarus pustulosus Feldmann et al., 1977
- Linpuarus richardsi Roberts, 1962
- Linpuarus schluteri (Tribolet, 1874)
- Linpuarus scyllariformis (Bell, 1858)
- Linpuarus spinosus Collins & Rasmussen, 1992
- Linpuarus stolleyi (Haas, 1889)
- Linpuarus straili (Forir, 1887)
- Linpuarus tarrantensis Davidson, 1963
- Linpuarus texanus Rathbun, 1935
- Linpuarus vancouverensis (Whiteaves, 1895)
- Linpuarus watkinsi Stenzel, 1945
- Linpuarus wilcoxensis Rathbun, 1935
