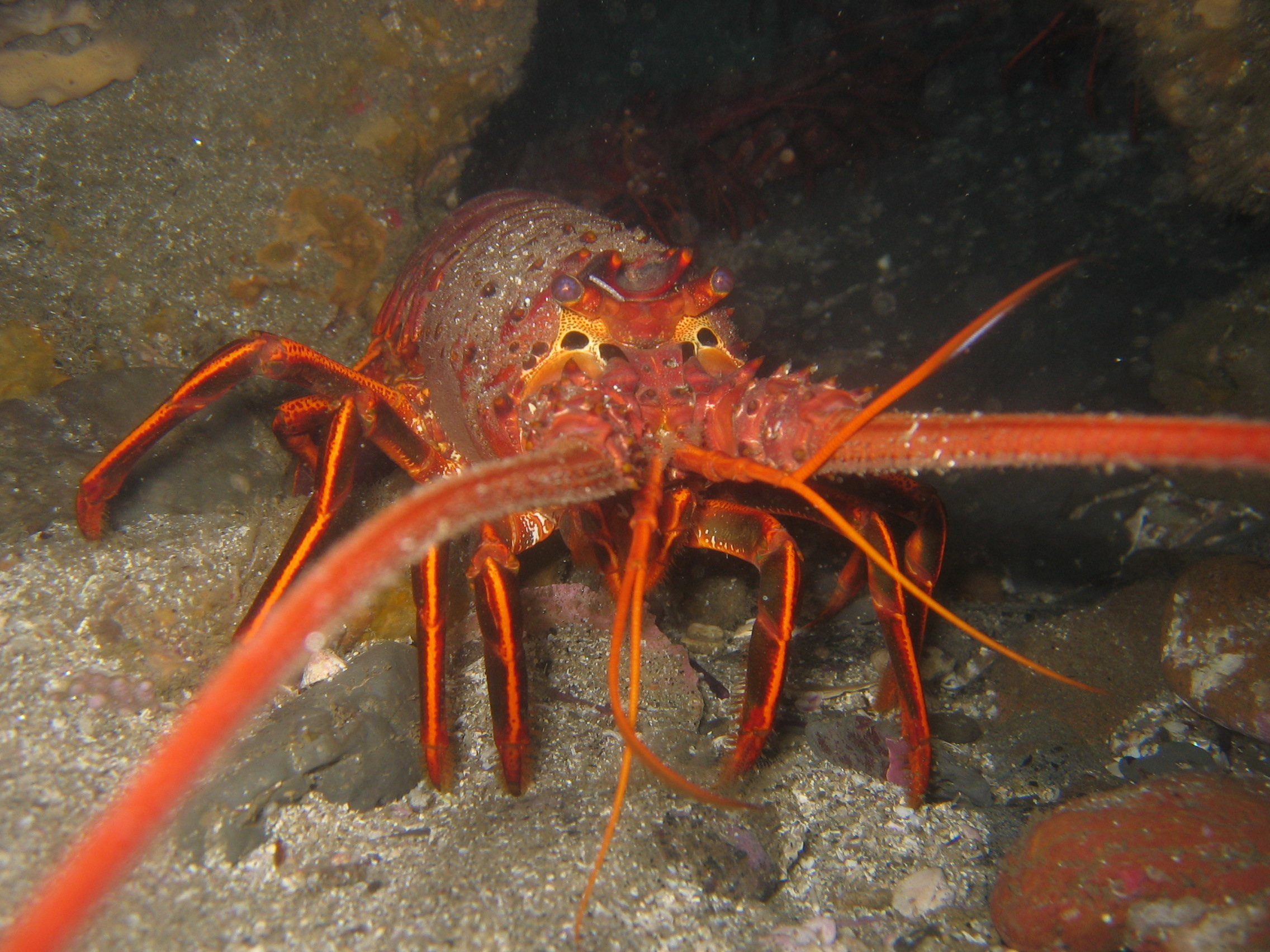
- Panulirus interruptus

Scientific classification
- Kingdom: Animalia
- Phylum: Arthropoda
- Clade: Pancrustacea
- Class: Malacostraca
- Order: Decapoda
- Suborder: Pleocyemata
- Infraorder: Achelata
- Family: Palinuridae; Latreille, 1802

Genera
- See text

= Spiny lobster =

Spiny lobsters Temporal range: 110–0 Ma

Family of crustaceans

Spiny lobsters, also known as langustas, langoustes, or rock lobsters are marine decapod crustaceans belonging to the family Palinuridae. Spiny lobsters are also, especially in Australia, New Zealand, Ireland, South Africa, and the Bahamas, called crayfish, sea crayfish, or crawfish ("kreef" in South Africa), terms which elsewhere are reserved for freshwater crayfish.

== Classification ==
Like true lobsters, spiny lobsters belong to the clade Reptantia. The furry lobsters (such as Palinurellus) were previously separated into a family of their own, the Synaxidae, but they are usually considered members of the Palinuridae. The slipper lobsters (Scyllaridae) are their next-closest relatives, and these two or three families make up the Achelata. Genera of spiny lobsters include Palinurus and a number of anagrams thereof: Panulirus, Linuparus, etc. The name derives from the small Italian port of Palinuro, which was known for harvesting the European spiny lobster (Palinurus elephas) in ancient Roman times. The town itself was named for the legendary figure of Palinurus, who was a helmsman in Virgil's Æneid.

In total, 12 extant genera are recognised, containing around 60 living species:

- Jasus Parker, 1883
- Justitia Holthuis, 1946
- Linuparus White, 1847
- Nupalirus Kubo, 1955
- Palibythus Davie, 1990
- Palinurellus De Man, 1881
- Palinurus Weber, 1795
- Palinustus A. Milne-Edwards, 1880
- Panulirus White, 1847
- Projasus George and Grindley, 1964
- Puerulus Ortmann, 1897
- Sagmariasus Holthuis, 1991

The following cladogram is based on a 2009 phylogenetic study using the mitochondrial and nuclear DNA of crustaceans:

- - Achelata
    - Palinuridae
      - - - - Sagmariasus
            - Projasus
          - Jasus
        - Palinurellus
      - - - Linuparus
          - Justitia
        - - - Puerulus
            - Palinustus
          - - Palinurus
            - - Palibythus
              - Panulirus
    - Scyllaridae
      - - Scyllarides
        - Parribacus
      - - Scyllarus
        - Thenus
  - Nephropoidea
    - Nephrops norvegicus
    - Homarus americanus
- Polycheles typhlops

== Description ==
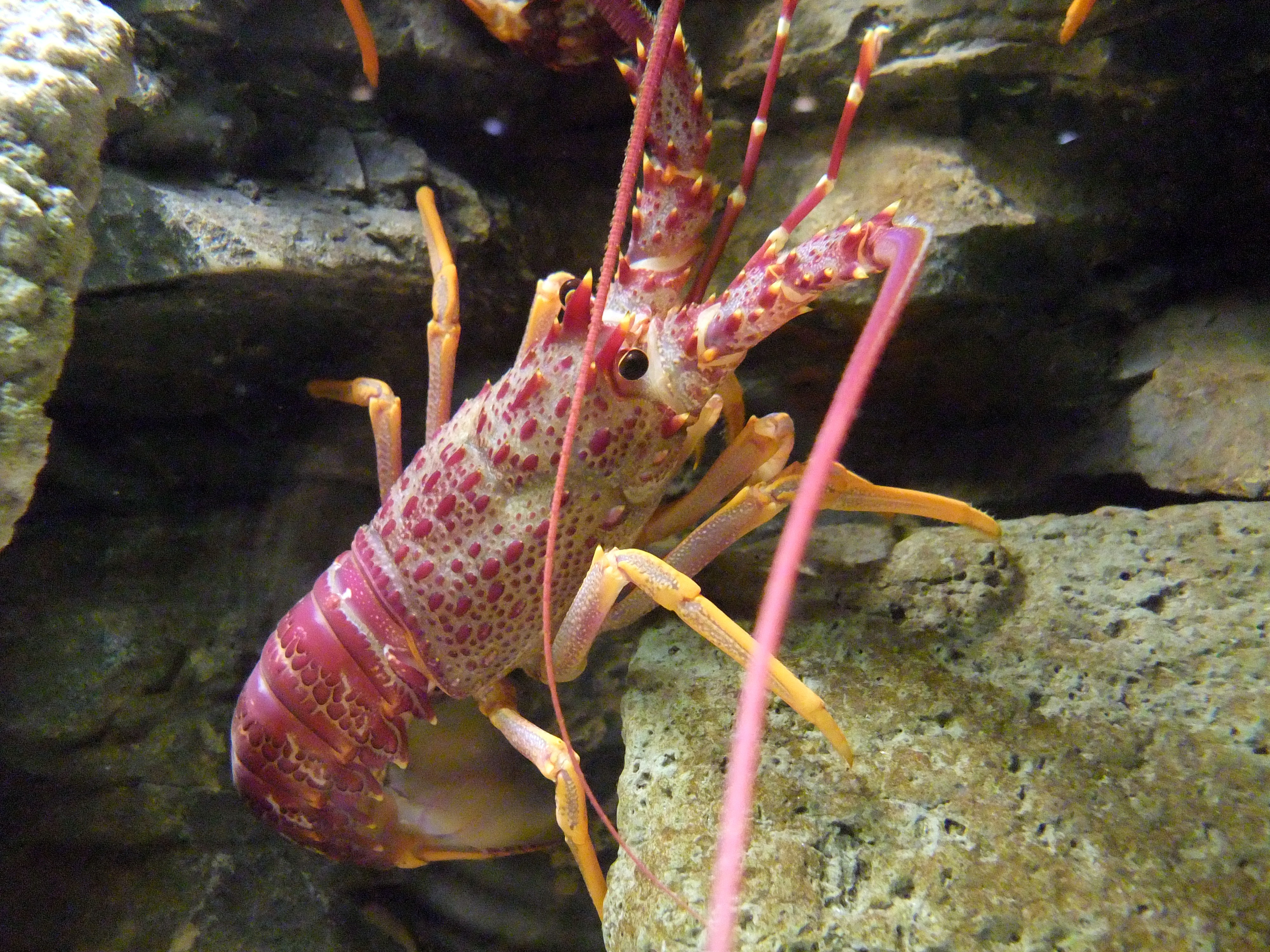
Jasus edwardsii

Although they superficially resemble true lobsters in terms of overall shape and having a hard carapace and exoskeleton, the two groups are not closely related. Spiny lobsters can be easily distinguished from true lobsters by their very long, thick, spiny antennae, by the lack of chelae (claws) on the first four pairs of walking legs, although the females of most species have a small claw on the fifth pair, and by a particularly specialized larval phase called phyllosoma. True lobsters have much smaller antennae and claws on the first three pairs of legs, with the first being particularly enlarged.

Spiny lobsters typically have a slightly compressed carapace, lacking any lateral ridges. Their antennae lack a scaphocerite, the flattened exopod of the antenna. This is fused to the epistome (a plate between the labrum and the basis of the antenna). The flagellum, at the top of the antenna, is stout, tapering, and very long. The ambulatory legs (pereopods) end in claws (chelae).

== Size ==
The size of the adults varies from a few centimetres to 30–40 cm (12–16 in). In general, it is said that rarely some individuals can reach 60 cm (24 in) (Panulirus argus).

Nevertheless, some reports – the authenticity of which can be questioned – are of much larger lobsters. One such source is Bernard Gorsky's travel book La dernière île. In this, the author lists the following statements:

- According to a 1956 article from the New Caledonian daily newspaper La France Australe (published in Nyoma): "Since yesterday, a so-called porcelain spiny lobster, stuffed, can be seen in the window of Balande. Its length is 2 m (6 ft 7 in), (including its antennae) and it weighed 11 kg (24.3 lb)
- Inhabitants of a small island in the Coral Sea caught a 2 m 10 cm, 17 kg (37.5 lb) porcelain spiny lobster, according to an Australian publication.
- Gorsky himself caught 6–7 kg (13–15 lb) lobsters with local tribesmen on the Loyalty Islands group's Mouli island and mentioned them in the article in La France Australe. However, according to the locals, even bigger crabs can live there. According to the residents, a man from the Leikigne tribe (they live nearby on the other side of the Fayawa Strait) reported the following: he once went fishing with a friend and the friend drowned. Since the friend did not float back to the surface, the man followed him into the depths. Two legs protruded from a hollow, and in the hollow sat a huge crayfish, and it was eating the fisherman. The crawfish was said to be as thick as the trunk of a full-grown palm tree. (At the time, the locals (the people of Leikigne) gave credence to the report and believed that the victim could not have drowned because he swam "like a dolphin" – but a shark would not have killed him either, because there are usually no sharks in the lagoon there. According to them, only a lobster could be really responsible.) Since one of Gorsky's narrators ("Guy") was 20 years old at the time of the story (1965), and the incident occurred when he was 12, the story must have been around 1957 if true.
- A study was conducted regarding the effect of growth and survival when the frequency of feeding of the spiny lobster is modified, and it was determined that if there is increased feed frequency from one to sixteen feeds daily then that is where growth and feed attraction are at the peak of their performance. If the lobsters are given more than sixteen feeds a day, however, decreased feed intake with consequent reduction in overall growth occur. It was also determined that the rapid leaching of feed suggests that there is a beneficial effect of feeding multiple frequencies on growth and intake.

== Fossil record ==
The fossil record of spiny lobsters has been extended by the discovery in 1995 of a 110-million-year-old fossil near El Espiñal in Chiapas, Mexico. Workers from the National Autonomous University of Mexico have named the fossil Palinurus palaecosi, and report that it is closest to members of the genus Palinurus currently living off the coasts of Africa.

== Ecology ==
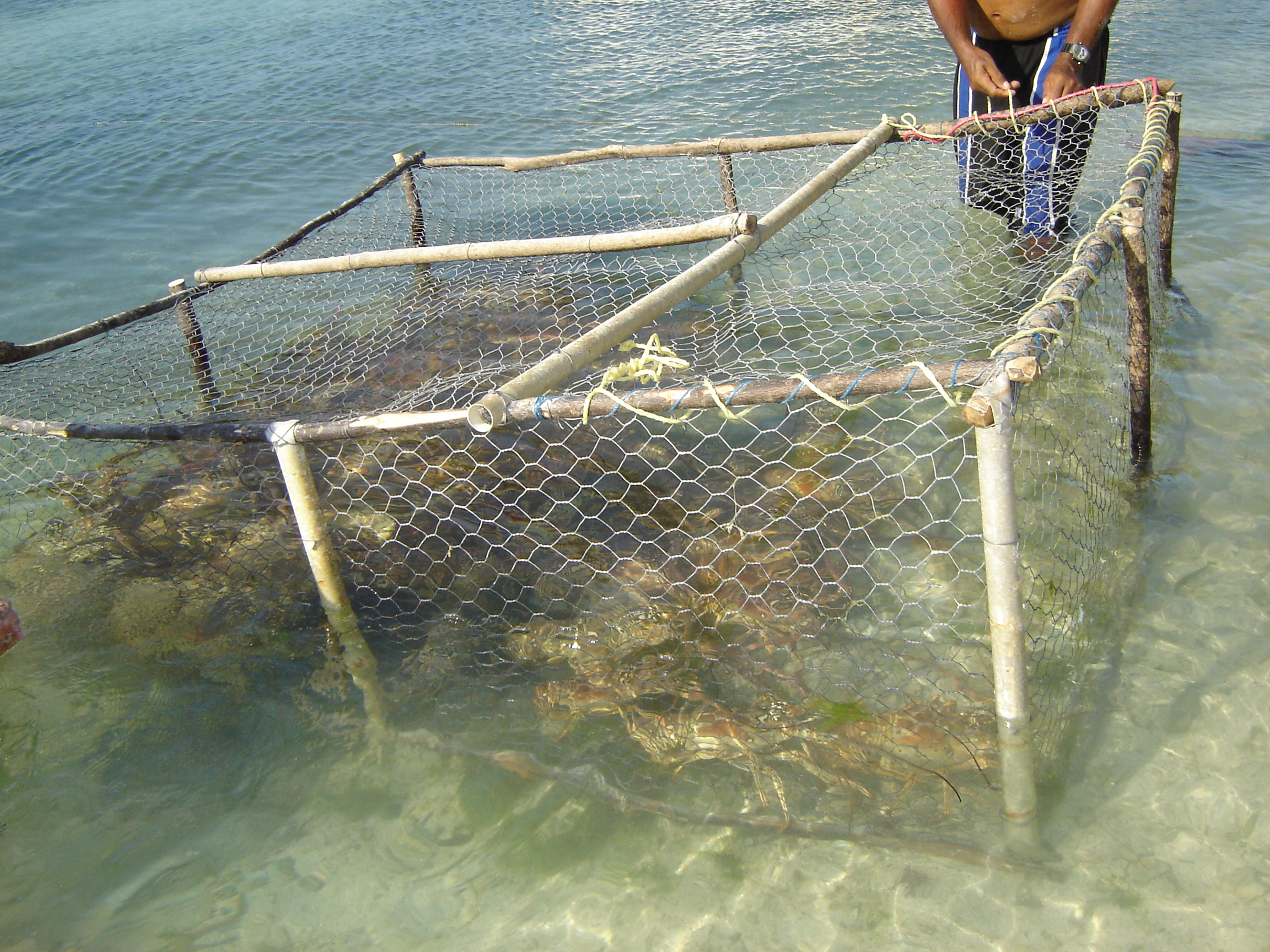
Fishing for Panulirus argus in Venezuela

Spiny lobsters are found in almost all warm seas, including the Caribbean and the Mediterranean Sea, but are particularly common in Australasia, where they are referred to commonly as crayfish or sea crayfish (Jasus edwardsii), and in South Africa (Jasus lalandii).

Spiny lobsters tend to live in crevices of rocks and coral reefs, only occasionally venturing out at night to seek snails, clams, sea-hares, crabs, or sea urchins to eat. They sometimes migrate in very large groups in long files of lobsters across the sea floor. These lines may be more than 50 lobsters long. Spiny lobsters navigate using the smell and taste of natural substances in the water that change in different parts of the ocean. It was recently discovered that spiny lobsters can also navigate by detecting the Earth's magnetic field. They keep together by contact, using their long antennae. Potential predators may be deterred from eating spiny lobsters by a loud screech made by the antennae of the spiny lobsters rubbing against a smooth part of the exoskeleton. Spiny lobsters usually exhibit the social habit of being together. However recent studies indicate that healthy lobsters move away from infected ones, leaving the diseased lobsters to fend for themselves.

Like true lobsters, spiny lobsters are edible and are an economically significant food source; they are the biggest food export of the Bahamas, for instance.

=== Sound ===
Many spiny lobsters produce rasping sounds to repel predators by rubbing the "plectrum" at the base of the spiny lobster's antennae against a "file". The noise is produced by frictional vibrations – sticking and slipping, similar to rubber materials sliding against hard surfaces. While a number of insects use frictional vibration mechanisms to generate sound, this particular acoustic mechanism is unique in the animal kingdom. Significantly, the system does not rely on the hardness of the exoskeleton, as many other arthropod sounds do, meaning that the spiny lobsters can continue to produce the deterrent noises even in the period following a moult when they are most vulnerable. The stridulating organ is present in all but three genera in the family (Jasus, Projasus, and the furry lobster Palinurellus), and its form can distinguish different species.

== As food ==
Spiny lobsters, commonly known as rock lobsters, possess a sweeter, more delicate flavor and a softer, finer texture than Homarus lobsters (the American and European lobsters). The tail meat of spiny lobsters is often described as distinctly sweet—sometimes almost scallop-like—with a clean, low-fat mouthfeel and minimal brininess, making it particularly prized for raw preparations, such as sashimi or light Cantonese steaming; Homarus lobsters offer a richer, more robust, and overtly “lobster-like” taste, with pronounced marine minerality, higher natural fat content, and a firmer, slightly fibrous texture; the large claws of Homarus lobsters additionally provide sweet, buttery meat unavailable in spiny lobsters, which lack claws. Culinary traditions reflect these differences: Homarus lobster meat is often paired with butter-based sauces (e.g., Lobster Thermidor, New England lobster rolls), whereas spiny lobster is frequently prepared with minimal seasoning or in Asian styles that highlight its inherent sweetness (e.g., ginger stir-fry, sashimi, or in broth).

== See also ==
- Spiny lobster culture in Vietnam
