= Black-tipped garfish =

Scientific classification
- Kingdom: Animalia
- Phylum: Chordata
- Class: Actinopterygii
- Division: Teleostei
- Order: Beloniformes
- Family: Hemiramphidae
- Genus: Hyporhamphus
- Species: H. neglectissimus

Binomial name
- Hyporhamphus neglectissimus Parin, Collette & Shcherbachev, 1980

Species of fish

The black-tipped garfish or black-tipped halfbeak (Hyporhamphus neglectissimus) is a halfbeak from the family Hemiramphidae.

== Information ==
It is found in the Indo-West Pacific, where it replaces Hyporhamphus neglectus in waters around New Guinea and northern Australia. The black-tipped halfbeak is known to be found within a marine environment within a pelagic-neritic range. This species is native to a tropical climate. The maximum recorded length of the Hyporhamphus neglectissimus as an unsexed male is about 14.4 centimeters or about 5.66 inches long. This species is native to the waters around New Guinea and northern Australia. The biology of this species explains this species to be a coastal species.

== Classification ==
The taxonomic classification of the Hyporhamphus neglectissimus is as follows:

- Kingdom : Animalia
- Eumetazoa : metazoans
- Phylum : Chordata
- Subphylum : Vertebrata
- Superclass : Gnathostomata
- Euteleostomi : bony vertebrates
- Actinopterygii : ray-finned fishes
- Order : Beloniformes
- Family : Hemiramphidae
- Genus : Hyporhamphus
- Species : Hyporhamphus neglectissimus
