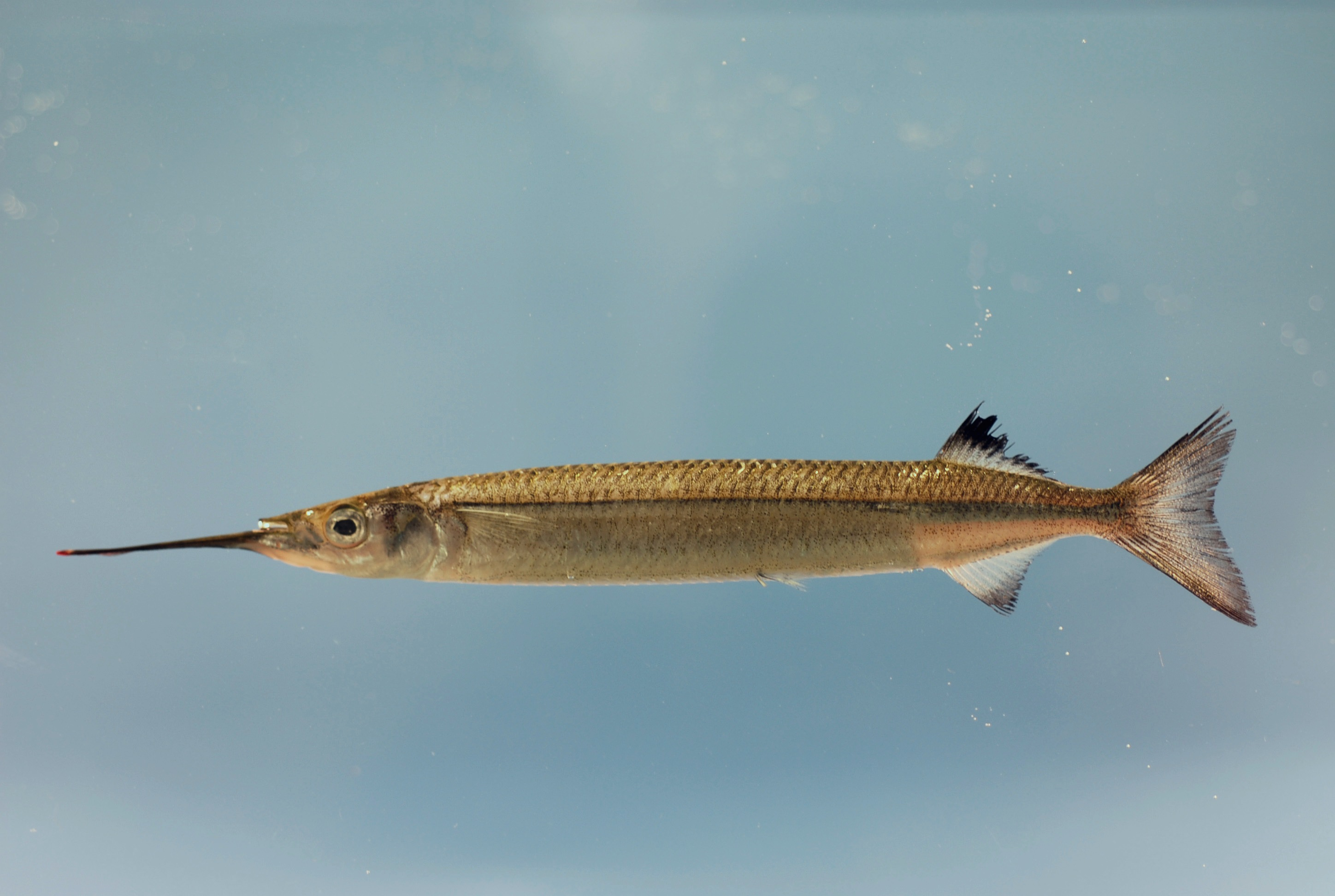
- American halfbeak (H. meeki)

Conservation status
- Least Concern (IUCN 3.1)

Scientific classification
- Kingdom: Animalia
- Phylum: Chordata
- Class: Actinopterygii
- Order: Beloniformes
- Family: Hemiramphidae
- Genus: Hyporhamphus
- Species: H. meeki

Binomial name
- Hyporhamphus meeki Banford & Collette, 1993

= American halfbeak =

Species of fish

The American halfbeak (Hyporhamphus meeki), also known as Meek's halfbeak, is a halfbeak from the family Hemiramphidae.

Its specific name is in honor of American ichthyologist Seth Eugene Meek (1859-1914).
