= Hyporhamphus collettei =

Conservation status
- Least Concern (IUCN 3.1)

Scientific classification
- Domain: Eukaryota
- Kingdom: Animalia
- Phylum: Chordata
- Class: Actinopterygii
- Order: Beloniformes
- Family: Hemiramphidae
- Genus: Hyporhamphus
- Species: H. collettei

Binomial name
- Hyporhamphus collettei Banford, 2010

Species of fish

Hyporhamphus collettei is a halfbeak from the family Hemiramphidae.

The specific name honours the American ichthyologist Bruce Baden Collette.

Found along the Western Atlantic, it is endemic to the nearshore marine waters of Bermuda.
