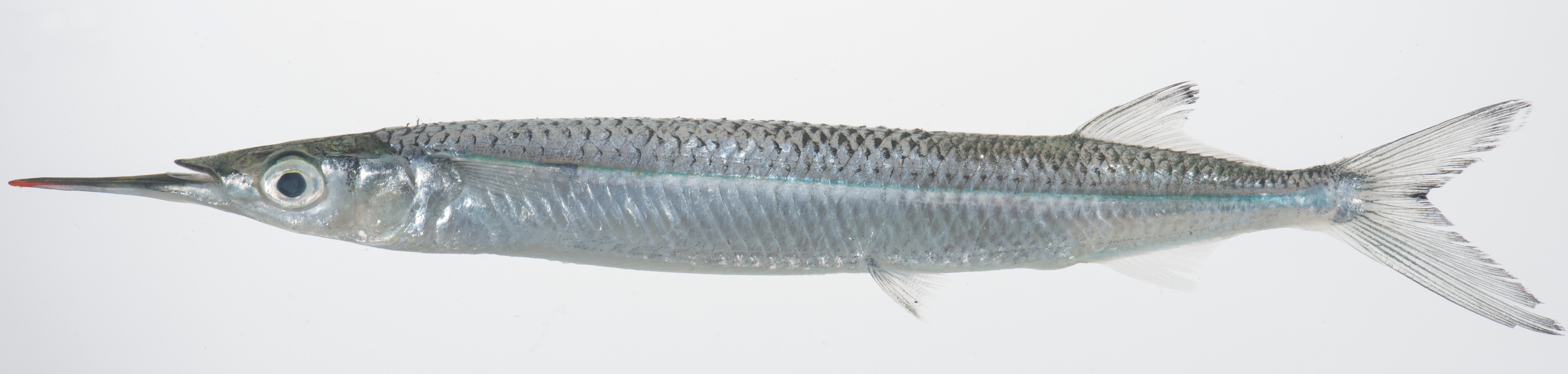

Scientific classification
- Kingdom: Animalia
- Phylum: Chordata
- Class: Actinopterygii
- Order: Beloniformes
- Family: Hemiramphidae
- Genus: Hyporhamphus
- Species: H. affinis

Binomial name
- Hyporhamphus affinis (Günther, 1866)

Synonyms
- Hemiramphus affinis Günther, 1866; Hemiramphus australensis Seale, 1906; Hemirhamphus delagoae Barnard, 1925; Hyporhamphus delagoae (Barnard, 1925)

= Hyporhamphus affinis =

Species of fish

Hyporhamphus affinis, the tropical halfbeak, tropical garfish, insular halfbeak or coral reef halfbeak, is a species of schooling marine fish from the family Hemiramphidae. It is distributed through the Indo-Pacific regions and has been recorded in the Mediterranean Sea which it reached through the Suez Canal.

== Description ==
Hyporhamphus affinis has a blue back with a silvery stripe on side, silvery white underparts and a blue caudal fin while the other fins are colourless. They grow to a maximum length of 38 cm. The distal half of the underside of the elongated lower jaw is bright red. There is a well developed anterior lobe on the dorsal fin and the caudal fin has a slightly longer lower lobe than the upper. The upper jaw is scaled, the pre-orbital region is much longer than the upper jaw.

== Distribution ==
Hyporhamphus affinis has an Indo-Pacific distribution from the Red Sea and coasts of eastern Africa east through the Indian Ocean islands to Western Australia, New Guinea, Philippines, and islands of Oceania, although it is absent from Hawaii and the Indo-Malayan Archipelago. It has been first recorded in the Levantine Sea in 1964 and has since spread as far west as Libya.

== Biology ==
Hyporhamphus affinis is found mainly at depths between 0 and 6m in proximity to coral reefs and islands but extends a little further from shore than Hyporhamphus dussumieri with which it is largely sympatric. It occurs in schools and feeds mainly on zooplankton, as well as small fish and detritus. The eggs are covered with adhesive filaments and are attached to floating and benthic objects.
