= Rhynchorhamphus malabaricus =

Scientific classification
- Kingdom: Animalia
- Phylum: Chordata
- Class: Actinopterygii
- Order: Beloniformes
- Family: Hemiramphidae
- Genus: Rhynchorhamphus
- Species: R. malabaricus

Binomial name
- Rhynchorhamphus malabaricus Collette, 1976

Species of fish

Rhynchorhamphus malabaricus or Malabar halfbeak is a halfbeak of the family Hemiramphidae of the order Beloniformes.

It is one of the four recognized species of the genus Rhynchorhamphus and can be found along the Western Indian Ocean, from southern India to Sri Lanka.
