= Hyporhamphus yuri =

Scientific classification
- Kingdom: Animalia
- Phylum: Chordata
- Class: Actinopterygii
- Order: Beloniformes
- Family: Hemiramphidae
- Genus: Hyporhamphus
- Species: H. yuri

Binomial name
- Hyporhamphus yuri Collette & Parin, 1978

Species of fish

Hyporhamphus yuri is a halfbeak from the family Hemiramphidae which has been reported from Okinawa and nearby islands in the north-west Pacific Ocean. This species was described by Bruce Baden Collette & Nikolai Vasilyevich Parin in 1978 from a type obtained at the Naha Market in Okinawa. The specific name honours the Russian ichthyologist Yuri Nikolayevich Shcherbachev of the Institute of Oceanology, Academy of Sciences of the USSR.
