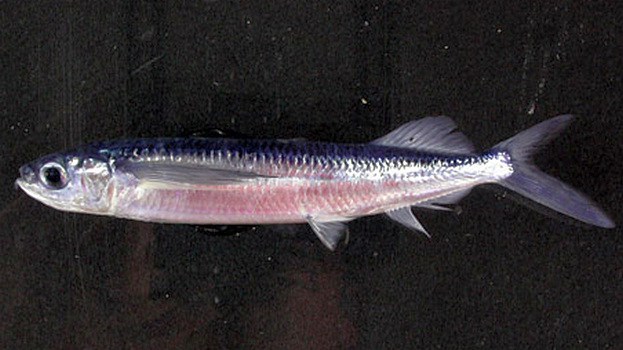

Scientific classification
- Kingdom: Animalia
- Phylum: Chordata
- Class: Actinopterygii
- Division: Teleostei
- Order: Beloniformes
- Family: Hemiramphidae
- Genus: Oxyporhamphus
- Species: O. micropterus

Binomial name
- Oxyporhamphus micropterus (Valenciennes, 1847)

Synonyms
- Exocoetus micropterus Valenciennes, 1847; Evolantia micropterus (Valenciennes, 1847); Hemiramphus argenteus Bennett, 1840; Hemiramphus cuspidatus Valenciennes, 1847

= Oxyporhamphus micropterus =

Species of fish

Oxyporhamphus micropterus, the bigwing halfbeak, is a species of halfbeak found in the tropical oceans. Halfbeaks (Hemiramphidae) are small ray-finned fish that are closely related to flying fish (Exocoetidae), and the two families share many physical characteristics, including wing-like pectoral fins. This species is found in the Indo-Pacific region, where it is a pelagic, open-ocean species. Achille Valenciennes first described this species in 1847, naming it Exocoetus micropterus. He found the first known specimen in King George Sound, Western Australia.

== Description ==
Oxyporhamphus micropterus is an epipelagic fish that resides in the tropical open oceans in the Pacific and Indian Oceans. Being in the same order and a close relative of the flying fish family, Exocoetidae, the morphology reflects the relationship, but there are some key differences. Compared to flying fish, the halfbeak has a center of gravity that is further towards the tail. This prevents the fish from taking off, as it would stall if it attempted to fly. These fish are half the length of the four-winged flying fish species, and a seventh of the weight.

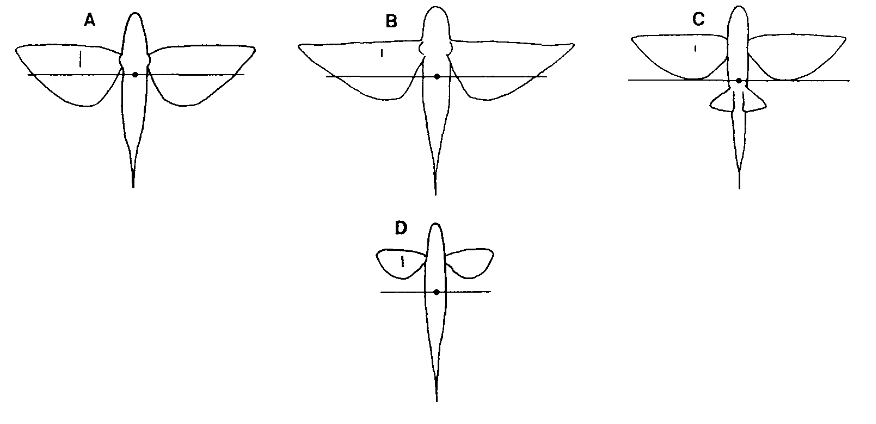
The wings, or the pectoral fins, are positioned more anteriorly on O. micropterus (D) than on the true flying fish (A, B, & C). The center of gravity is also more posterior in O. micropterus, rendering it unable to glide above the water surface.

The adults of this species are more robust and plumper than the juveniles, and their pectoral fins are positioned more towards the head than those of flying fish. The standard length of the fish is typically 125-130mm, with some of the largest reaching 176-185mm. The typical mass of the fish is around 30.2 grams. The body has an oval cross-section and is elongate. The fish is overall bright silver, with a blue-green tint dorsally. The pectoral and caudal fins have a melanistic pigment, and the dorsal and anal fins are translucent with a lack of chromatophores. The eyes of the fish are moderately sized, and the head is small. This fish, contrary to its relatives, has a lower jaw that is not noticeably elongate, and the length of its pectoral fins is about a quarter to a third of the length of its body. The pectoral fins are elongated. The fish has no dorsal or anal spines, with 13-15 rays in the dorsal fin and 13-15 in the anal fin. The anal fin’s origin is beneath the third to fourth dorsal ray. It has a forked caudal fin, the upper lobe shorter than the lower lobe. The lateral line is made up of 57-59 scales. The fish has a single chamber that makes up the swim bladder, it has 47-50 vertebral bones, 17-20 gill rakers on its first arch, and 11 branchiostegal rays. Compared with its closest relative, Oxyporhamphus similis, the False halfbeak, a few recently revealed morphological disparities set O. micropterus apart as a distinct species. First, O. micropterus has a significantly lower count in gill rakers, ranging from 24-27, compared to 31-34 in O. similis. The vertebral count of O. similis is markedly different from that of O. micropterus at 51-43. The predorsal scale count of O. micropterus (28-33) is lower than that of O. similis (31-37). The anal fin origin of O. micropterus is situated below the third to fourth dorsal fin ray, a distinct feature of O. micropterus.

== Systematics ==
Oxyporhamphus micropterus is part of the family Hemiramphidae. Hemiramphidae is one of the five families in the order Beloniformes, along with Exocoetidae, the true flying fishes. The families Exocoetidae and Hemiramphidae diverged approximately 33.0 million years ago. One of the eight genera in Hemiramphidae is Oxyporhamphus. Previously, Oxyporhamphus was classified as a “short-winged flying fish” because of its similar size and ecology, but more recent studies have reclassified it as a halfbeak. This genus is made up of two species: Oxyporhamphus micropterus, the bigwing halfbeak, and Oxyporhamphus similis, the false halfbeak. These taxa are separated geographically by the oceans, with O. similis widespread in the central Atlantic Ocean and O. micropterus in the Indian and Pacific Oceans. Many taxonomists classify the taxa not as distinct species but as two subspecies of Oxyporhamphus micropterus: Oxyporhamphus micropterus micropterus and Oxyporhamphus micropterus similis.

== Distribution ==
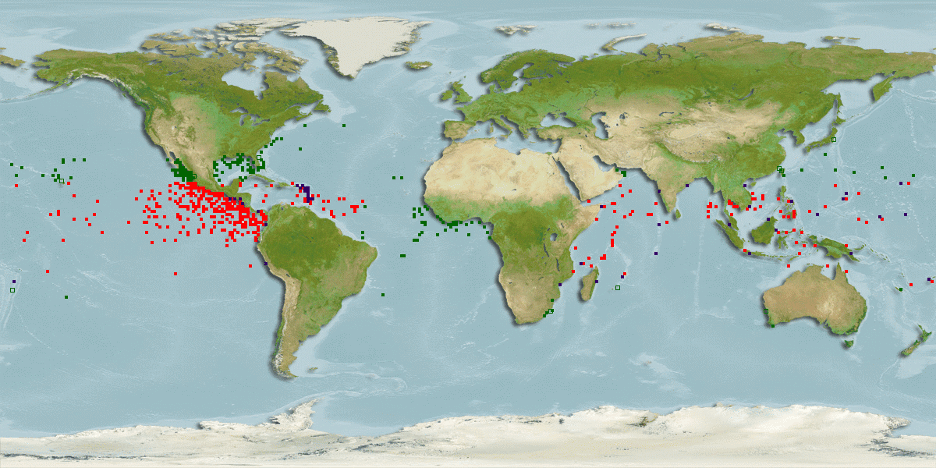
This map shows all reported O. micropterus accounts. It displays their preference for tropical waters in the Indo-Pacific.

Oxyporhamphus micropterus is abundant and widespread throughout tropical open oceans in the Indo-Pacific. It is replaced by the false halfbeak in the tropical waters of the Atlantic Ocean. The halfbeaks do not associate with the coast at any point in their life cycle. O. micropterus can be found in the central region of the South China Sea and even as far north as the Sea of Japan. Their range differs from that of other species in their family in that they don’t associate with landforms, such as small islands, and have a propensity for open ocean rather than neritic waters. The planktonic larvae of O. micropterus have one of the highest abundances of any ichthyoplankton in its ecosystem. In a study comparing the abundance of ichthyoplankton to microplastics, the density of planktonic larvae in the open-ocean water column is reported to be 0.0044 larvae per 100 m-3, the highest density of any planktonic fish larvae reported in the study.

== Life history ==
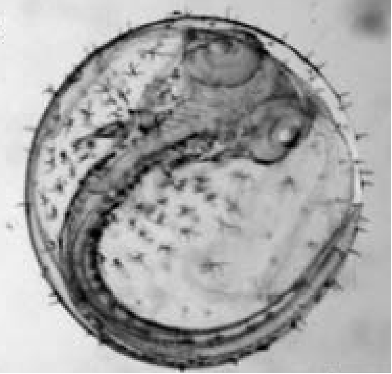
An egg of O. micropterus displaying the numerous short spines, translucent color, and spherical shape

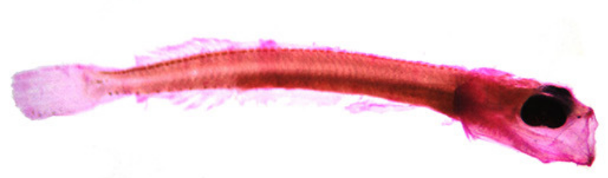
An O. micropterus larva, a planktonic organism, has developed pectoral fins before hatching from its egg.=

Oxyporhamphus micropterus reproduces throughout the entire year in the open ocean, laying eggs high in the water column that hatch into planktonic larvae. Their eggs are spherical, with many short spines, transparent, have a narrow perivitelline space, have a homogeneous yolk, lack oil globules, and are uniformly distributed during reproduction. The pectoral fins in the larvae are developed, and the mouth opens before the eggs hatch. The eggs tend to be concentrated around seamounts. The larvae that hatch from eggs are planktonic and filter-feed on smaller zooplankton that are <1 mm in size. The larvae grow in length and body weight at proportional rates until they become adults. Their tissue is soft and flexible, providing support to the fish as it grows, helping prevent it from collapsing as its mass increases. With increased weight, the fish becomes more elongate, maintaining their streamlined shape, thus exhibiting isometric growth. The diet of adult O. micropterus is predominantly composed of copepods and amphipods. A study on the feeding ecology of flying fish and relatives showed that 64% of the halfbeak’s diet consisted of copepods and 18.4% of amphipods. This species participates in resource partitioning with other similar species in the tropical epipelagic, with evolved gill rakers that help it feed on specific zooplankton that other ichthyofauna don’t feed on. Resource partitioning has helped the tropical epipelagic increase and maintain a high species diversity.

== Human use ==
Bigwing halfbeaks are primarily caught in pelagic trawl nets and seines, dip nets fitted with lights during the night, and gillnets. Although widely considered not a tremendous commercial fish, halfbeaks are found in local markets. One example of a local market is a halfbeak fishery on the southeast coast of India. In that fishery, the locals use halfbeaks as bait fish when fishing for billfish. They are consumed in many parts of the world, cooked in various ways: fresh, salted, smoked, or dried.

== Conservation status ==
Although many sources have not evaluated the conservation status of Oxyporhamphus micropterus, the species is widespread throughout the Indo-Pacific region, abundant, and appears to be of least concern. There are a few threats to the abundance of this species. A major one is microplastics, which impact the larval population of halfbeaks. A study that compared the density of plastic debris in the water column and the density of larval O. micropterus revealed that the planktonic larvae feed on microplastic particles that are shaped like major zooplankton taxa that are in the area. This contamination is not only a risk to the larvae but also an even greater risk to the predators of the larvae. Microplastics bioaccumulate as they move up the food chain, eventually polluting top predators such as marine birds and tuna, leading to gut blockages and starvation throughout members of the food chain. Another potential conservation concern for O. micropterus is the parasitic isopod, Lironeca spp. The University of Costa Rica found that this parasite infected O. micropterus off the coast of Baja California Sur. When observed, about 29% of the 70 O. micropterus evaluated had the parasite attached to the first dorsal fin, either partially or totally replacing it. The isopod had made a cavity that reached into the fish, approximately half the parasite’s body length. Many of the Lironeca occupy the gill cavity of the fish, impairing its respiration while the isopod feeds on oxygen and organic particles from the gills. Discovering more about parasitic isopods may help conserve O. micropterus and other hosts the parasite infects.
