= Arrhamphus krefftii =

Scientific classification
- Kingdom: Animalia
- Phylum: Chordata
- Class: Actinopterygii
- Order: Beloniformes
- Family: Hemiramphidae
- Genus: Arrhamphus
- Species: A. krefftii

Binomial name
- Arrhamphus krefftii Steindachner, 1867

Synonyms
- Hemiramphus kreftii Steindachner, 1867; Arrhamphus sclerolepis krefftii (Steindachner, 1867); Hemirhamphus breviceps Castelnau, 1878

Species of fish

Arrhamphus krefftii, the snub-nosed garfish, is a species of halfbeak in the genus Arrhamphus found in coastal waters of Australia from south of Rockhampton in Queensland to Sydney. The identity of the person honoured in the specific name is uncertain but it is thought that it may be the Australian zoologist and paleontologist Gerard Krefft (1830–1881). This species was previously classified as a subspecies of Arrhamphus sclerolepis, and remains so according to some authorities. This species is a herbivore and eats seagrass during the day. At night, it is a carnivore, eating mainly crustaceans.
