= Lampara net =

Type of fishing net

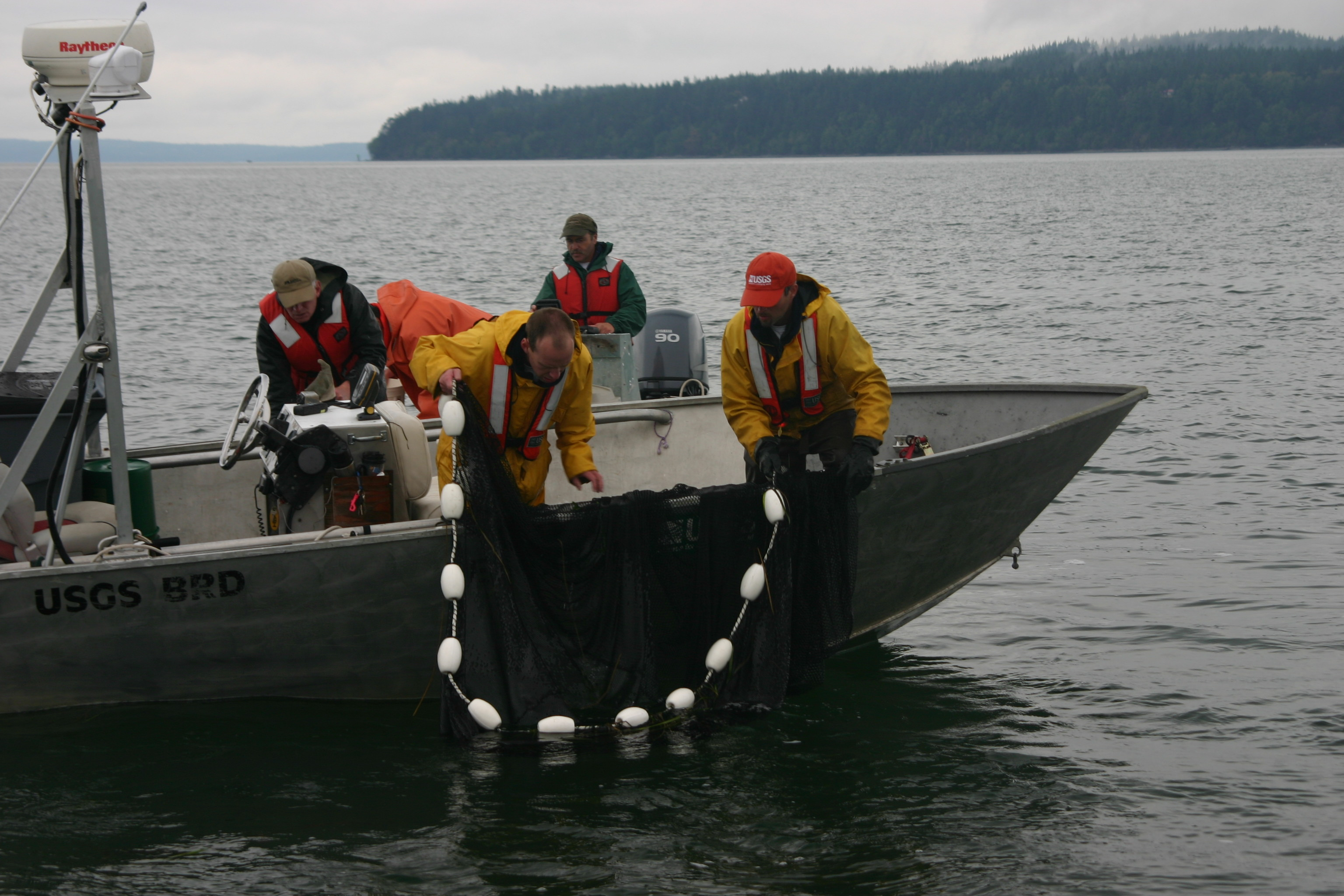
Fishing with a lampara net

A lampara net is a type of fishing net. It is a surrounding net having the shape of a spoon or a dustpan with a short leadline under a longer floatline. The net has a central bunt to contain the fish and two lateral wings.

Lampara nets are used for capturing pelagic fish, those swimming near the water's surface. They are often used in the Mediterranean, the United States, and South Africa to catch sardines. In Argentina they are used for anchoveta and mackerels and in Japan for sea breams and flying fish. They are used in Australia to catch eastern sea garfish (Hyporhamphus australis). In South Florida in the US lampara nets are used to catch ballyhoo (Hemiramphus brasiliensis) and balao (H. balao), which are used as bait fish by anglers. The fishery for opalescent inshore squid (Doryteuthis opalescens) in California became successful after Italian immigrants introduced the lampara net there in 1905.

These nets are often utilized on fishing vessels 9 to 18 meters long with 50 to 150 horsepower engines. The nets are hauled in by hand by a team of crewmembers pulling the lateral wings. The fish are removed with a smaller net or a scoop.
