= Rhynchorhamphus naga =

Scientific classification
- Kingdom: Animalia
- Phylum: Chordata
- Class: Actinopterygii
- Order: Beloniformes
- Family: Hemiramphidae
- Genus: Rhynchorhamphus
- Species: R. naga

Binomial name
- Rhynchorhamphus naga Collette, 1976

Species of fish

Rhynchorhamphus naga is a halfbeak of the family Hemiramphidae of the order Beloniformes.

It is one of the four recognized species of the genus Rhynchorhamphus. Found in the Western Central Pacific, actually restricted to the Gulf of Thailand, South China Sea and Java Sea.
