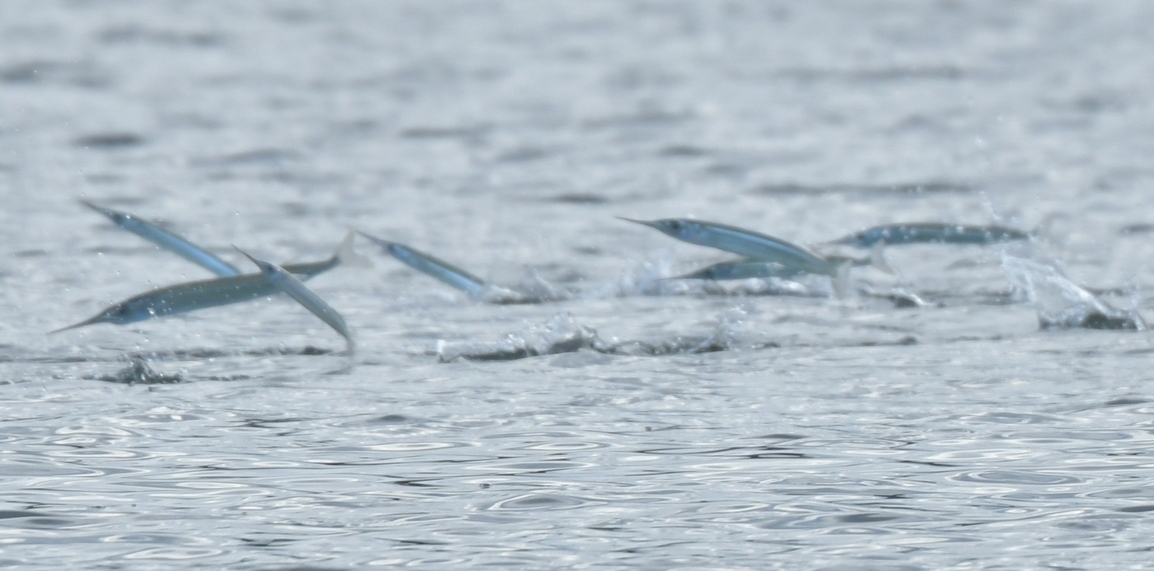
- A school of Hyporhamphus ihi in Northland

Scientific classification
- Kingdom: Animalia
- Phylum: Chordata
- Class: Actinopterygii
- Division: Teleostei
- Order: Beloniformes
- Family: Hemiramphidae
- Genus: Hyporhamphus
- Species: H. ihi

Binomial name
- Hyporhamphus ihi Phillipps, 1932

= Hyporhamphus ihi =

Species of halfbeak found all around New Zealand in shallow inshore waters

Hyporhamphus ihi, known as garfish, piper or by its Māori name takeke, is a halfbeak found all around New Zealand in shallow inshore waters.

== Names ==
Hyporhamphus ihi is commonly known as the garfish, piper or takeke in English. In the indigenous Māori language, it has several names: hangenge, ihe, karehā, takeke and wariwari.

== Description ==
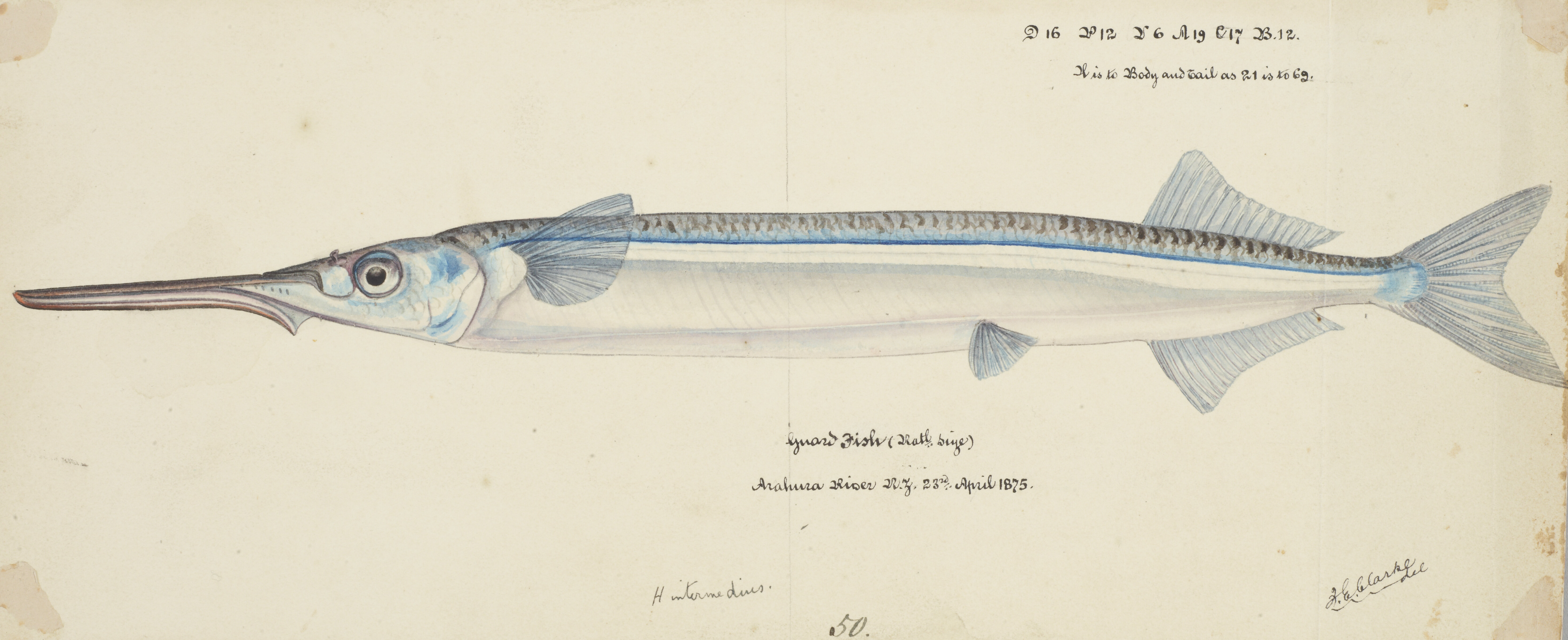
An illustration of Hyporhamphus ihi from 1875

The garfish is an unusual looking fish with many distinct features such as its elongated slender body, as well as its long lower jaw. The garfish typically grows to about 22 centimetres (8.7 in). The colouring of the fish allows it to appear somewhat camouflaged due to it having a greenish blue upper body with brown flecks and a silver-white belly and underbody. According to Montgomery and Saunders, "the fish can control its coloration by expanding or reducing the pigment in the dorsal melanophores". They also have a long silver stripe running from the top of the pectoral fin base to the tail.

The pectoral, dorsal, pelvic and caudal fins are dusky, and the anal fin is pale. As is usual with fish fins, the pectoral fin allows the fish to turn left or right and also support the stability of the fish. The dorsal fin, located well back on the garfish helps it make sharp turns and stabilise rolling. Unlike most fishes, the dorsal fin of the garfish lacks spines. Rather than having multiple spines running top to bottom, the dorsal fin is soft and veins of cartilage give rigidity to it when needed. The pelvic fin aids the fish with stopping quickly and general stability, as well as diving into deeper waters and rising to the surface. The caudal fin is the main propulsion fin, also known as the tail. Garfish have a forked caudal fin with a large lower lobe, called the hypocercal tail. The anal fin on the garfish, which allows it to have further stability in the water, is located at the back of the body.

Their most distinctive feature is their long lower jaw with an orange tip. Their upper jaw is usually longer than wide and their lower jaw is usually longer than the head length, which allows them to detect vibrations caused by prey. Due to their mouth posted far back from the front end of their body, "this places the mouth in a superior position making the garfish 'well adapted 'for surface feeding". The elongated jaw is a sensory organ, used to detect prey.

Another feature they obtain is the two to three rows of teeth that they have in both the upper and lower jaw. These types of teeth are called tricuspid, there are teeth are on both the premaxillae (which is small cranial bones at the very tip of the upper jaw, and the dentaries (which is an anterior bone of the lower jaw which is an area that bears teeth.

== Distribution ==
The garfish is endemic to New Zealand and this particular species is only found here, however southern garfish, H. melanochir a similar species can be identified in Australia. The garfish occurs all around New Zealand. They are also found in the southwest Pacific and the Chatham Islands. However, they are most common in northern and central inshore areas of New Zealand.

Garfish occupy inshore waters to depths of a few meters, in sheltered gulfs, bays, and larger estuaries, mainly around seagrass meadows or shallow waters, and over shallow reefs. Although garfish are widespread, it is rare and uncommon to estimate garfish abundance. This is due to their localised schooling behaviour, which makes it difficult to estimate abundance. The fish are typically found in the open ocean during the daytime, staying close to the surface of the water to avoid detection. They migrate to harbours and estuaries in the evening.

== Life cycle ==
The lifestyle patterns of the garfish are unknown to New Zealand in great detail; however, they may be similar to closely related species from Australia such as the southern garfish (H. melanochir). It is known that the New Zealand garfish matures at 22 cm (8.7 in) and had a maximum of 40 cm (16 in), however, the maximum age may be slightly lower than 10 years.

The New Zealand garfish is known to spawn at the end of spring to around the beginning summer. This is done in shallow bays, allowing the eggs to sink to the seafloor and adhere to vegetation. After the eggs adhere to the vegetation the larvae may be taken in coastal plankton surveys. It is also suspected that the garfish are less variable in comparison to other small pelagic eggs. This feature however allows localized populations, which are susceptible to local depletion.

== Prey and predators ==
Garfish are omnivorous as they feed on eelgrass, seaweed and smaller crustaceans, such as zooplankton, mysids, crab larvae and polychaete larvae. The garfish is a nocturnal planktivore however, and does not rely on sight to catch prey. It was seen that a tapetum lucidum was absent. This means that the amount of light that can pass through the retina was not as strong as nocturnal fish that obtain this feature. Their pupils are small and are fully occupied by the lens. The garfish swims with a nearly rigid body, which has been related to its use of the lateral line in feeding. Due to the presence of the lateral line system and the absence of the tapetum lucidum it indicated that the beak may have had a sensory function. This led to the hypothesis that the garfish use their anterior lateral line system to detect prey.

Due to the garfish's localised schooling behavior, they attract bigger species of fish and mammals such as the kingfish (Morrison, Lowe, Spong & Rush, 2007) and dolphins. The schooling behavior of garfish also exposes them to heavy predation from sea birds such as gannets, shags and penguins. However, it is unlikely that garfish would be predated on by all three seabird species at once. The species of seabird that the garfish is subject to predation from is heavily dependent on whereabouts in the marine environment they are. Garfish schooling in shallow harbor areas are likely to be predated upon by shags, while garfish schooling in more open, deeper waters will more likely become prey for gannets/penguins.

== In a human context ==
Garfish were once a staple resource for early Maori and were of high cultural significance. They were a source of food as well as an important source of bait when fishing for larger species such as yellowtail kingfish. Garfish were generally caught by dragging a finely woven flax net across seagrass beds in shallow harbors. A seine-like technique was used where one end of the net was fixed to the shore while the other end was dragged out and around in a large arc and pulled back to shore. The same technique is still used by modern fishermen by where a fine mesh net is dragged around shallow harbors. The garfish are often kept alive and transported to other fishing grounds where they are deployed as live baits for fish such as snapper, kingfish and kahawai.

Garfish are considered easy to fish in New Zealand. They are often eaten by battering and frying in a doughnut shape, created by rolling a fish around a bottle as a way to more easily break and remove the spine.
