= Rhynchorhamphus arabicus =

Scientific classification
- Kingdom: Animalia
- Phylum: Chordata
- Class: Actinopterygii
- Order: Beloniformes
- Family: Hemiramphidae
- Genus: Rhynchorhamphus
- Species: R. arabicus

Binomial name
- Rhynchorhamphus arabicus Parin & Shcherbachev, 1972

Species of fish

Rhynchorhamphus arabicus or Arabian flyingfish is a halfbeak of the family Hemiramphidae of the order Beloniformes.

It is one of the four recognized species of the genus Rhynchorhamphus and can be found in the Western Indian Ocean, near Yemen and Somalia.
