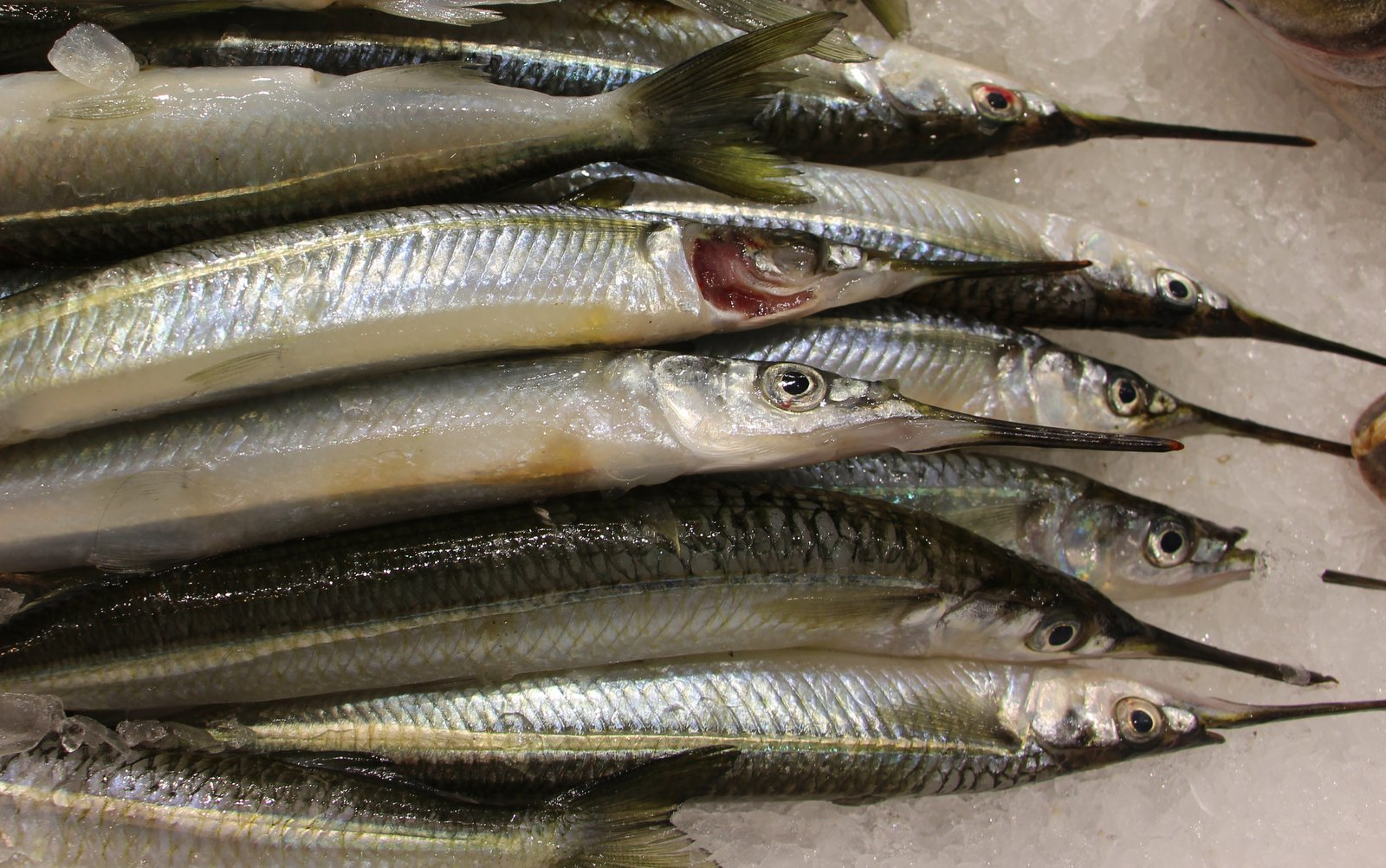

Scientific classification
- Domain: Eukaryota
- Kingdom: Animalia
- Phylum: Chordata
- Class: Actinopterygii
- Order: Beloniformes
- Family: Hemiramphidae
- Genus: Hyporhamphus
- Species: H. regularis

Binomial name
- Hyporhamphus regularis (Günther, 1866)

= Hyporhamphus regularis =

river garfish

Species of fish

Hyporhamphus regularis is a halfbeak garfish from the family Hemiramphidae. It is found in Australian waters. The red tip on the lower jaw is an identification feature.
