= Hyporhamphus neglectus =

Scientific classification
- Kingdom: Animalia
- Phylum: Chordata
- Class: Actinopterygii
- Order: Beloniformes
- Family: Hemiramphidae
- Genus: Hyporhamphus
- Species: H. neglectus

Binomial name
- Hyporhamphus neglectus (Bleeker, 1866)

Synonyms
- Hemirhamphus neglectus Bleeker, 1866

Species of fish

Hyporhamphus neglectus is a halfbeak from the family Hemiramphidae.

It is found in the Western Central Pacific. It replaces the coastal Hyporhamphus limbatus in waters around Java, Sumatra, Borneo and the Philippines. It is also known from the middle of the eastern coast of Queensland, Arnhem Land, Northern Territory, and the northern part of Western Australia, and from offshore islands .
