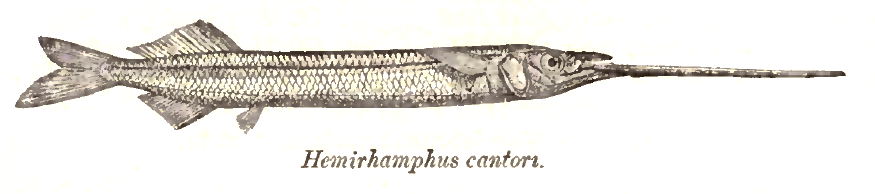
- Long-billed Halfbeak (R. georgii)

Scientific classification
- Kingdom: Animalia
- Phylum: Chordata
- Class: Actinopterygii
- Order: Beloniformes
- Family: Hemiramphidae
- Genus: Rhynchorhamphus; Fowler, 1928

Type species
- Hemiramphus georgii Valenciennes, 1847

= Rhynchorhamphus =

Genus of fishes

Rhynchorhamphus is a genus of halfbeaks. They are found in western Pacific and Indian ocean.

== Species ==
There are currently four recognized species in this genus:

- Rhynchorhamphus arabicus Parin & Shcherbachev, 1972 (Arabian flyingfish)
- Rhynchorhamphus georgii (Valenciennes, 1847) (Long-billed halfbeak)
- Rhynchorhamphus malabaricus Collette, 1976 (Malabar halfbeak)
- Rhynchorhamphus naga Collette, 1976
