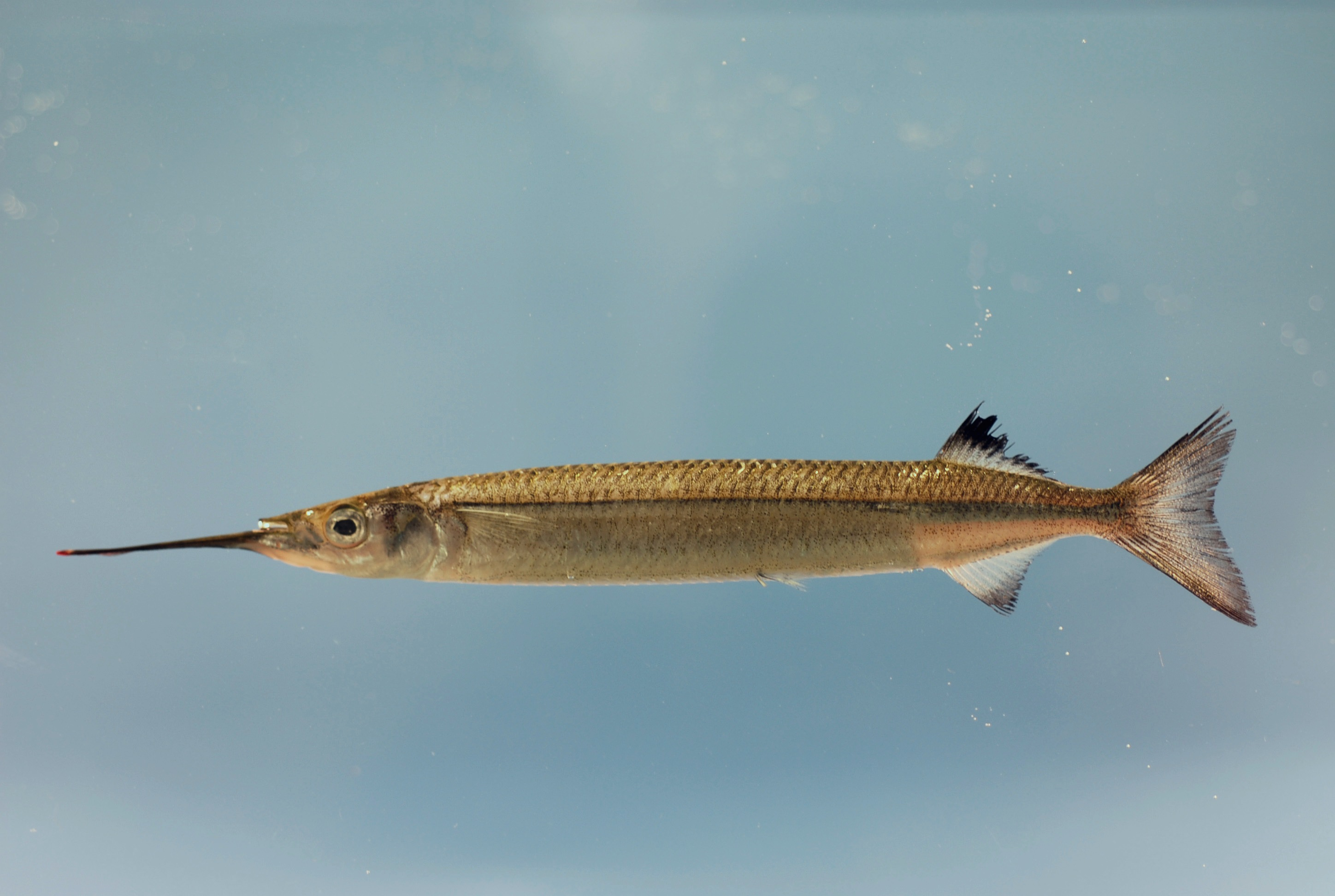
- American halfbeak (H. meeki)

Scientific classification
- Kingdom: Animalia
- Phylum: Chordata
- Class: Actinopterygii
- Order: Beloniformes
- Family: Hemiramphidae
- Genus: Hyporhamphus; T. N. Gill, 1859

Type species
- Hyporhamphus tricuspidatus T. N. Gill, 1859

Synonyms
- Eulepidorhamphus Fowler, 1919; Ichthyacus Fernández-Yépez, 1948; Odontorhamphus Weed, 1933; Reporhamphus Whitley, 1931

= Hyporhamphus =

Hyporhamphus Temporal range: Oligocene–present

Genus of fishes

Hyporhamphus is a genus of halfbeaks. The species in this genus are distributed throughout the warmer seas of the world, most species being Indo-Pacific and there are some freshwater species.

== Species ==
There are currently 39 recognized species in this genus:

- Hyporhamphus acutus (Günther, 1872)
  - Hyporhamphus acutus acutus (Günther, 1872) (Pacific halfbeak)
  - Hyporhamphus acutus pacificus (Steindachner, 1900) (Acute halfbeak)
- Hyporhamphus affinis (Günther, 1866) (Tropical halfbeak)
- Hyporhamphus australis (Steindachner, 1866) (Eastern sea garfish)
- Hyporhamphus balinensis (Bleeker, 1858) (Balinese garfish)
- Hyporhamphus brederi (Fernández-Yépez, 1948)
- Hyporhamphus capensis (Thominot, 1886) (Cape halfbeak)
- Hyporhamphus collettei Banford, 2010
- Hyporhamphus dussumieri (Valenciennes, 1847) (Dussumier's halfbeak)
- Hyporhamphus erythrorinchus (Lesueur, 1821)
- Hyporhamphus gamberur (Rüppell, 1837) (Red Sea halfbeak)
- Hyporhamphus gernaerti (Valenciennes, 1847)
- Hyporhamphus gilli Meek & Hildebrand, 1923 (Choelo halfbeak)
- Hyporhamphus hildebrandi Jordan & Evermann, 1927
- Hyporhamphus ihi Phillipps, 1932 (New Zealand piper)
- Hyporhamphus improvisus (J. L. B. Smith, 1933) (Shortfin halfbeak)
- Hyporhamphus intermedius (Cantor, 1842) (Asian pencil halfbeak)
- Hyporhamphus limbatus (Valenciennes, 1847) (Congaturi halfbeak)
- Hyporhamphus meeki Banford & Collette, 1993 (American halfbeak)
- Hyporhamphus melanochir (Valenciennes, 1847) (Southern sea garfish)
- Hyporhamphus melanopterus Collette & Parin, 1978
- Hyporhamphus mexicanus Álvarez, 1959 (Mexican halfbeak)
- Hyporhamphus naos Banford & Collette, 2001 (Pacific silverstripe halfbeak)
- Hyporhamphus neglectissimus Parin, Collette & Shcherbachev, 1980 (Black-tipped garfish)
- Hyporhamphus neglectus (Bleeker, 1866)
- Hyporhamphus pacificus (Steindachner, 1900)
- Hyporhamphus paucirastris Collette & Parin, 1978
- Hyporhamphus picarti (Valenciennes, 1847) (African halfbeak)
- Hyporhamphus quoyi (Valenciennes, 1847) (Quoy's garfish)
- Hyporhamphus regularis (Günther, 1866)
  - Hyporhamphus regularis ardelio (Whitley, 1931) (Eastern river garfish)
  - Hyporhamphus regularis regularis (Günther, 1866) (Western river garfish)
- Hyporhamphus roberti (Valenciennes, 1847)
  - Hyporhamphus roberti hildebrandi D. S. Jordan & Evermann, 1927 (Central American halfbeak)
  - Hyporhamphus roberti roberti (Valenciennes, 1847) (Slender halfbeak)
- Hyporhamphus rosae (D. S. Jordan & C. H. Gilbert, 1880) (California halfbeak)
- Hyporhamphus sajori (Temminck & Schlegel, 1846) (Japanese halfbeak)
- Hyporhamphus sindensis (Regan, 1905) (Sind halfbeak)
- Hyporhamphus snyderi Meek & Hildebrand, 1923 (Skipper halfbeak)
- Hyporhamphus taiwanensis Collette & J. X. Su, 1986
- Hyporhamphus unicuspis Collette & Parin, 1978 (Simpletooth halfbeak)
- Hyporhamphus unifasciatus (Ranzani, 1841) (Common halfbeak)
- Hyporhamphus xanthopterus (Valenciennes, 1847) (Red-tipped halfbeak)
- Hyporhamphus yuri Collette & Parin, 1978

Two fossil species are also known:

- †Hyporhamphus jerzyi (Jerzmanska, 1985) - Oligocene of Poland & Ukraine (Menilitic Formation) and France (Rhine Graben) (=Hemirhamphus georgii Jerzmanska, 1968)
- †Hyporhamphus tatjanchenkoi Bannikov, Carnevale & Kotylar, 2016 - Middle Miocene of the North Caucasus, Russia.

H. tatjachenkoi appears to be related to the modern Hyporamphus affinis and Hyporhamphus gamberur.
