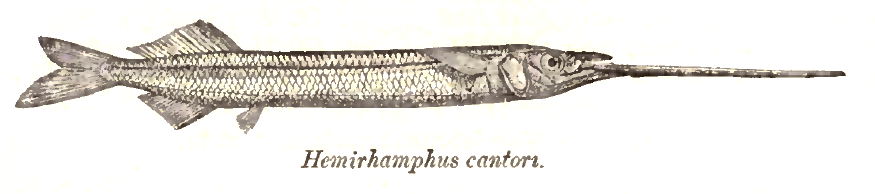
- Long-billed Halfbeak (R. georgii)

Conservation status
- Least Concern (IUCN 3.1)

Scientific classification
- Kingdom: Animalia
- Phylum: Chordata
- Class: Actinopterygii
- Order: Beloniformes
- Family: Hemiramphidae
- Genus: Rhynchorhamphus
- Species: R. georgii

Binomial name
- Rhynchorhamphus georgii (Valenciennes, 1847)

Synonyms
- Hemiramphus georgii Valenciennes, 1847; Hyporhamphus georgi (Valenciennes, 1847); Hyporhampus georgii (Valenciennes, 1847); Hemiramphus eclancheri Valenciennes, 1847; Hemiramphus leucopterus Valenciennes, 1847; Hemiramphus russeli Valenciennes, 1847; Hemirhamphus plumatus Blyth, 1858; Hemirhamphus cantori Bleeker, 1866; Loligorhamphus normani Whitley, 1931

= Rhynchorhamphus georgii =

Species of fish

Rhynchorhamphus georgii or long-billed halfbeak is a halfbeak of the family Hemiramphidae of the order Beloniformes.

It is one of the four recognized species of the genus Rhynchorhamphus. One of the most widespread of them, it is found from the Persian Gulf through the Arabian Sea and Bay of Bengal through the Western Central Pacific north to Taiwan and Hong Kong and east to New Guinea and northern Australia.

This species was described by Achille Valenciennes in 1847 with the type locality given as the Mumbai and Coromandel, India. The specific name honours the French voyager and merchant Jean-Jacques Dussumier (1792-1883) who Valenciennes referred to as "George".
