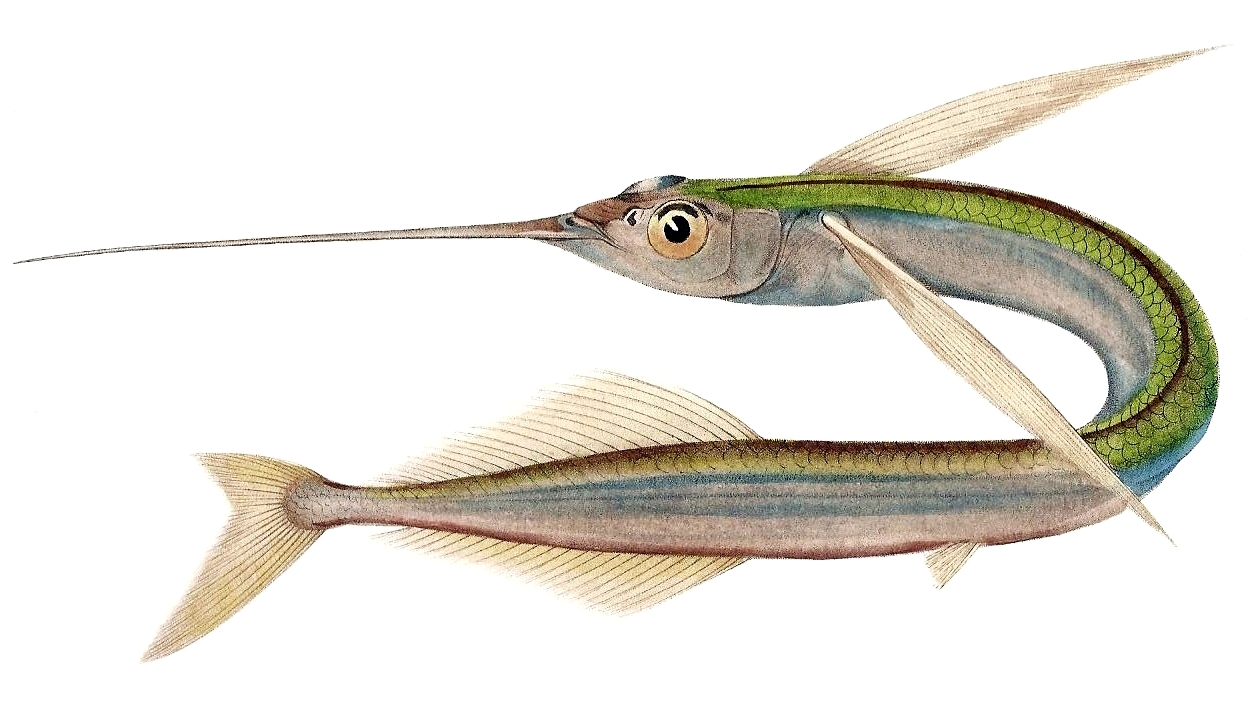

Scientific classification
- Kingdom: Animalia
- Phylum: Chordata
- Class: Actinopterygii
- Order: Beloniformes
- Family: Hemiramphidae
- Genus: Euleptorhamphus
- Species: E. viridis

Binomial name
- Euleptorhamphus viridis (van Hasselt, 1823)

= Euleptorhamphus viridis =

Species of fish

Euleptorhamphus viridis is a species of fish in the family Hemiramphidae.
