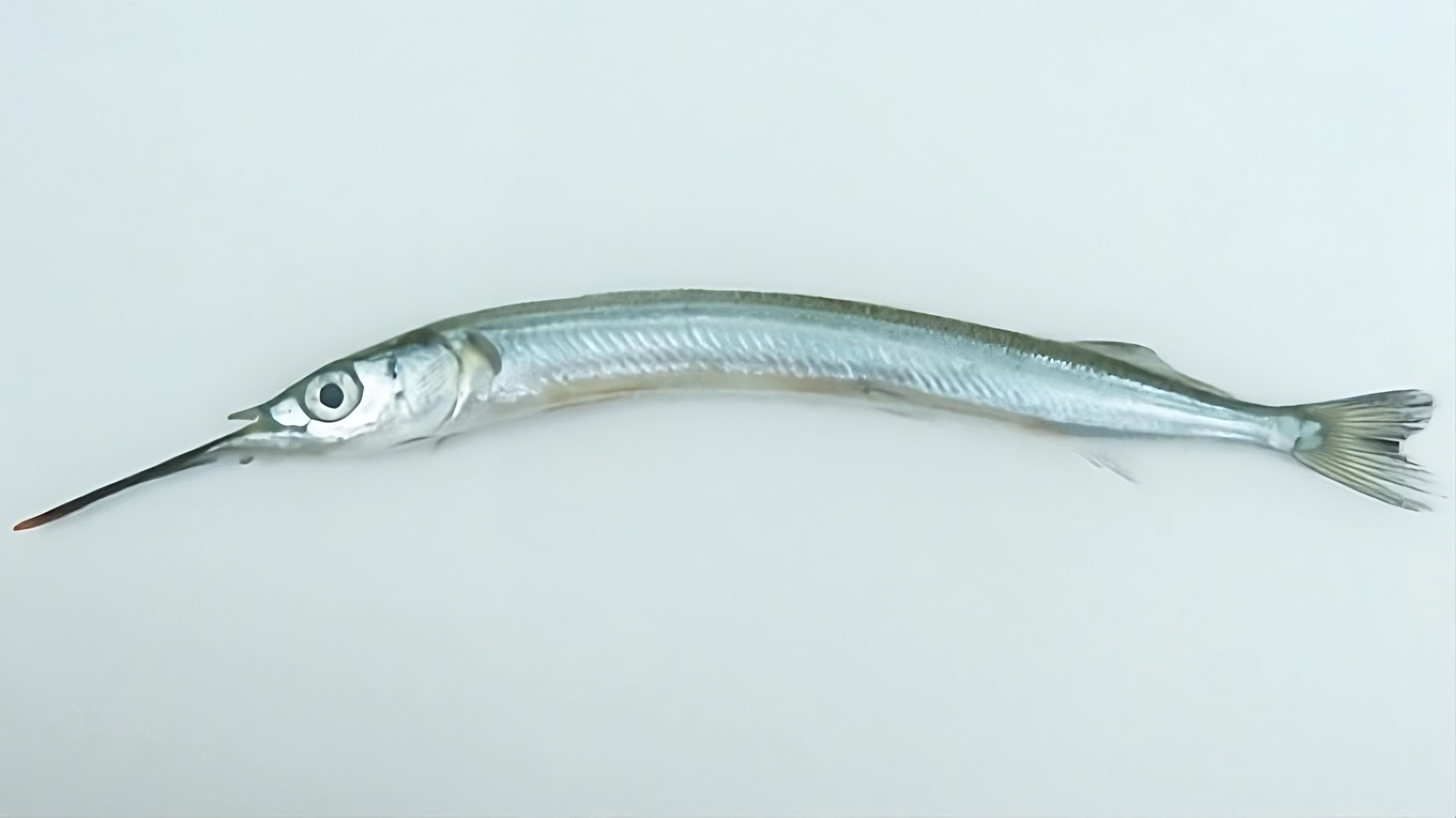

Scientific classification
- Kingdom: Animalia
- Phylum: Chordata
- Class: Actinopterygii
- Division: Teleostei
- Order: Beloniformes
- Family: Hemiramphidae
- Genus: Hyporhamphus
- Species: H. sajori

Binomial name
- Hyporhamphus sajori (Temminck & Schlegel, 1846)

Synonyms
- Hemiramphus sajori Temminck & Schlegel, 1846

= Hyporhamphus sajori =

Species of ray-finned fish

Hyporhamphus sajori, commonly known as the Japanese halfbeak, Japanese needlefish, or sayori (サヨリ, sayori), is a slender, surface-dwelling fish in the halfbeak family, native to coastal waters influenced by warm currents.

== Description ==
The Japanese halfbeak makes a popular dish during the spring fishing season, often called a "seasonal spring fish". Adults typically measure 20–30 cm in length, with some reaching 40 cm, and average around 300 grams, though this varies.

== Taxonomy and distribution ==
H. sajori was first described in 1846 by Coenraad Jacob Temminck and Hermann Schlegel. It belongs to the genus Hyporhamphus within the Hemiramphidae family, initially named Hemiramphus sajori. Genetic studies using mitochondrial DNA show low population diversity, with 70 specimens collected from East Asia (Japan, China, and the Korean Peninsula) appearing similar based on family tree and network analyses.

== Ecology ==
The fish can be infected by an egg-bearing female Mothocya isopod, typically in the left gill area. One such case was recorded on May 17, 2019, in Toyama Bay off Ishikawa Prefecture.

== Cultural Significance ==
It is a favored ingredient in cuisine, often served raw as sashimi or grilled, and commonly found in restaurants.
