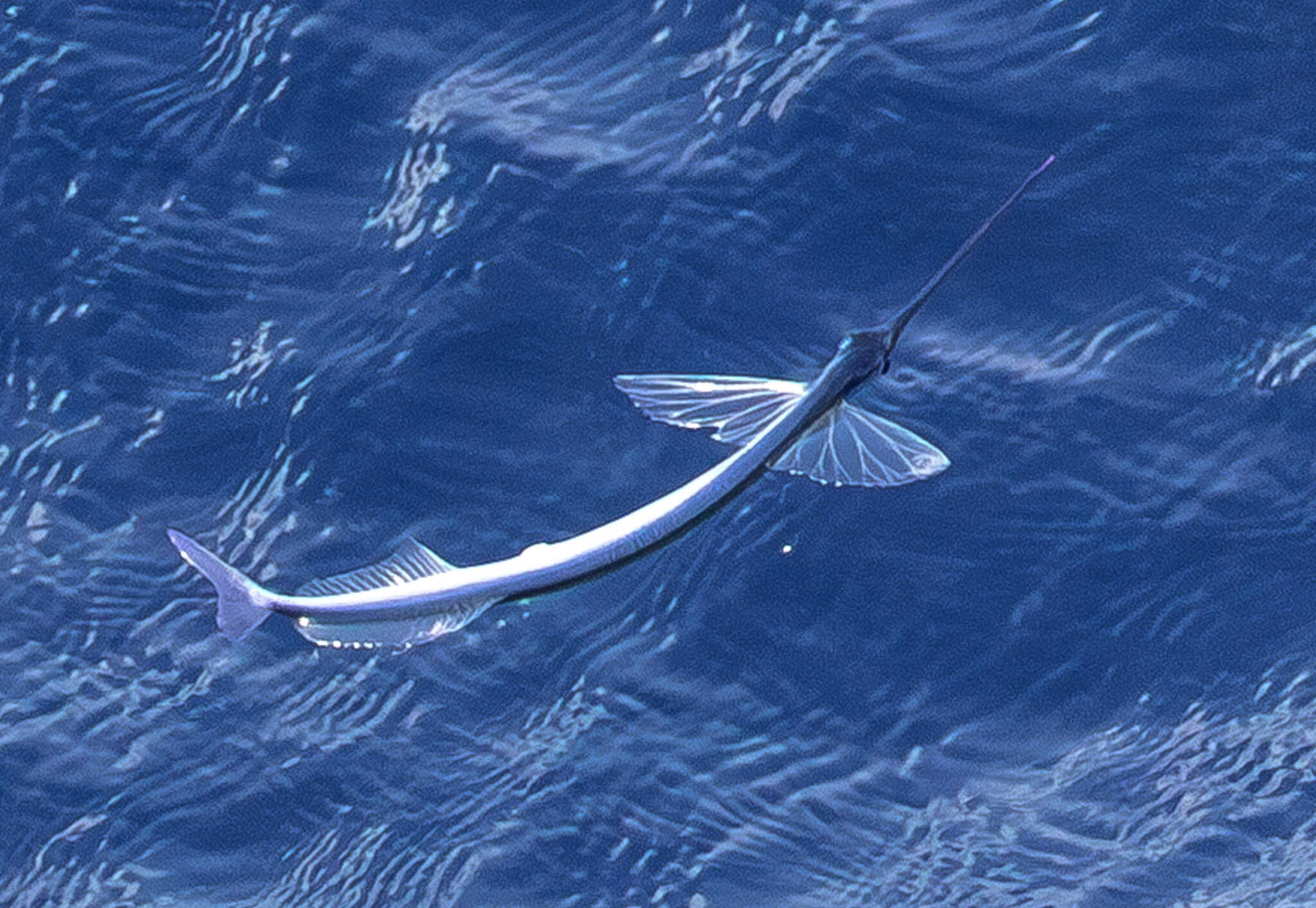

Conservation status
- Least Concern (IUCN 3.1)

Scientific classification
- Kingdom: Animalia
- Phylum: Chordata
- Class: Actinopterygii
- Order: Beloniformes
- Family: Hemiramphidae
- Genus: Euleptorhamphus
- Species: E. velox

Binomial name
- Euleptorhamphus velox Poey, 1868

= Euleptorhamphus velox =

Species of fish

Euleptorhamphus velox is a species of halfbeak native to the Atlantic.
