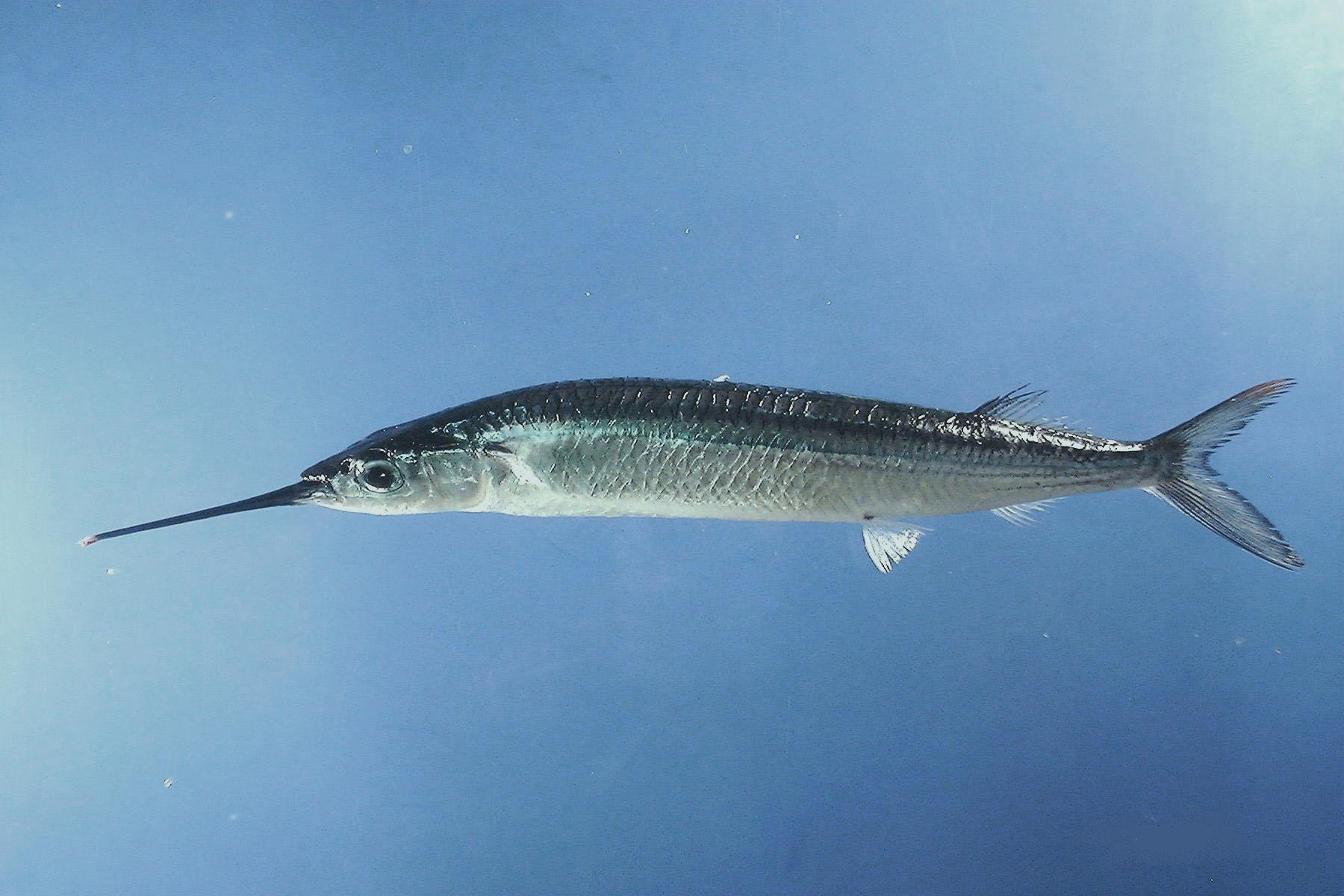

Conservation status
- Least Concern (IUCN 3.1)

Scientific classification
- Kingdom: Animalia
- Phylum: Chordata
- Class: Actinopterygii
- Order: Beloniformes
- Family: Hemiramphidae
- Genus: Hyporhamphus
- Species: H. unifasciatus

Binomial name
- Hyporhamphus unifasciatus (Ranzani, 1841)

Synonyms
- Hemiramphus unifasciatus Ranzani, 1841; Hemiramphus richardi Valenciennes, 1847; Hyporhamphus richardi (Valenciennes, 1847); Hyporhamphus tricuspidatus Gill, 1859

= Hyporhamphus unifasciatus =

Species of fish

Hyporhamphus unifasciatus, the common halfbeak or the Atlantic silverstripe halfbeak, is a bony fish in the family Hemiramphidae. It is found in the subtropical western Atlantic Ocean and the Gulf of Mexico. It is a common fish and not used for food to any great extent, and the International Union for Conservation of Nature has listed its conservation status as being of "least concern".

== Description ==
The common halfbeak grows to a length of about 30 cm (12 in). It is an elongated cylindrical fish, tapering slightly at both ends; the length is typically six to ten times the depth. As is typical of halfbeaks, the lower jaw is elongated (less so in young fish) while the upper jaw is short. There are many sharp teeth, and the dorsal surface of the head has a patch of enlarged scales. The dorsal fin has 14 to 16 soft rays and the anal fin has 15 to 17 soft rays, these two fins being of equivalent size and both being set far back near the caudal peduncle. There are no extra little finlets between them and the tailfin. The general colour of this fish is dark green with a silvery sheen. There are three dark longitudinal lines on the top of the back and the fins have dusky edges. A silvery line runs from the eye to the caudal peduncle, and the flanks below this are paler. In the living fish, the tip of the lower jaw is red. The lining of the abdominal cavity is black.

== Distribution and habitat ==
The common halfbeak is native to the sub-tropical western Atlantic Ocean. Its range includes both the Atlantic coasts of America, the Caribbean coast and the Gulf of Mexico, and its range extends as far north as the Gulf of Maine. It occurs in the shallow sublittoral zone down to depths of about 5 m (16 ft) in coastal areas, bays and estuaries.

== Ecology ==
This is a schooling fish living in surface waters. It is an omnivore, feeding on algae, pieces of seagrass, small invertebrates and fish. It is oviparous.

== Status ==
The common halfbeak is a common fish in most of its range and is especially abundant in the northern Gulf of Mexico. It is sometimes caught as bycatch when fishing for other species but, although it is edible, it is not much esteemed. No specific threats to this species have been identified and the International Union for Conservation of Nature has listed it as being of "least concern".
