= Surrounding net =

Type of fishing net

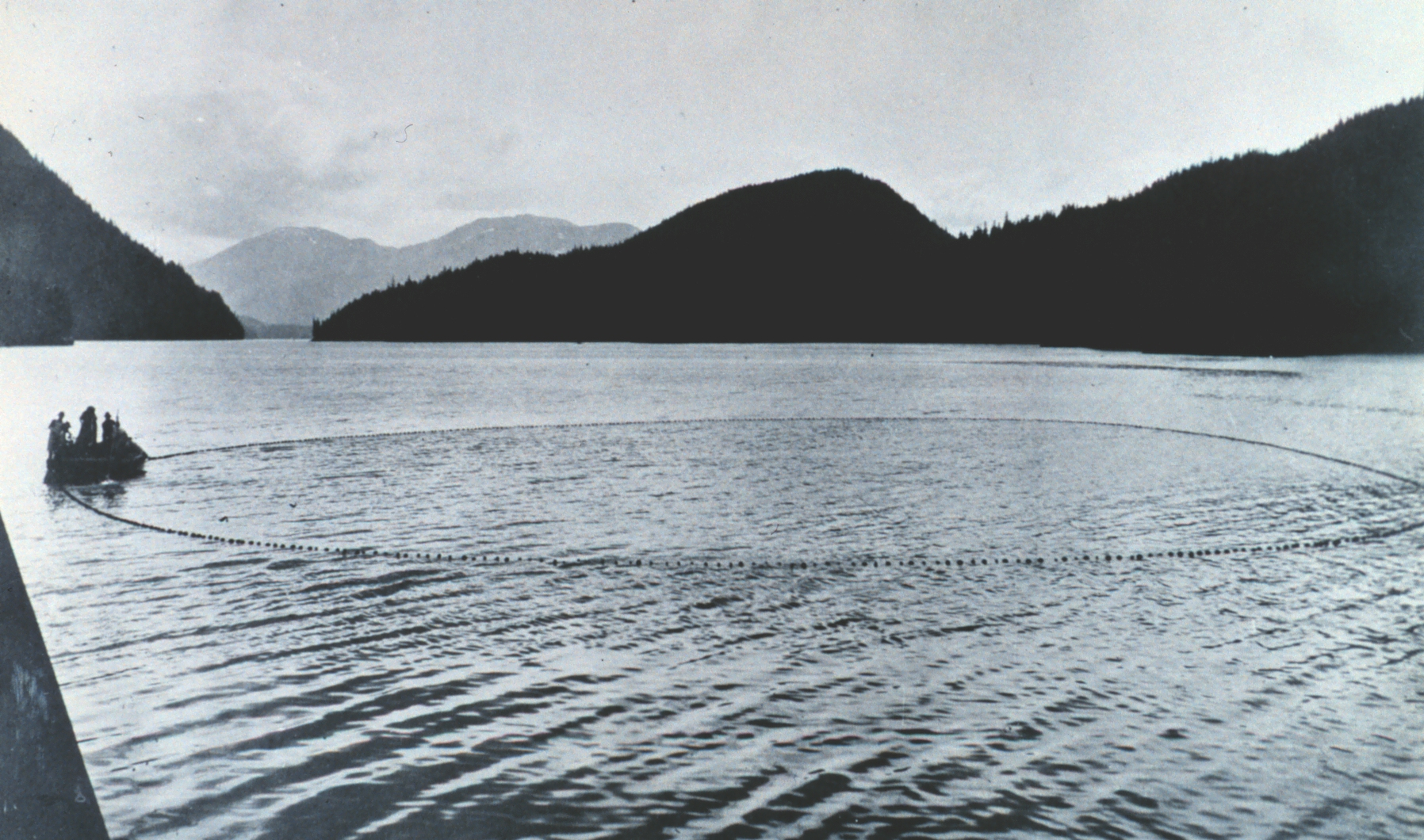
The purse seine is an example of a surrounding net. Here any salmon swimming near the surface are surrounded with a wall of netting, supported by floats.

A surrounding net is a fishing net which surrounds fish and other aquatic animals on all sides and underneath. It is typically used by commercial fishers, and pulled along the surface of the water. There is typically a purse line at the bottom, which is closed when the net is hauled in.

A surrounding net is deployed by a fishing boat that starts sailing in a circle. This allows for the net to come all the way around 360 degrees to completely surround the fish. This makes it so that there is no escape for the fish. There are floating buoys on the top of the net and weights on the bottom of the net to make sure that it forms a wall. This is one of the easiest ways to trap a school of fish. A seine net is one of the most common types of surrounding nets used in the commercial fishing industry. One negative of surrounding nets is the fact that they might catch an animal that they are not intentionally trying to catch.

== See also ==
- Lampara net
