= Oxyporhamphus similis =

Conservation status
- Least Concern (IUCN 3.1)

Scientific classification
- Kingdom: Animalia
- Phylum: Chordata
- Class: Actinopterygii
- Order: Beloniformes
- Family: Hemiramphidae
- Genus: Oxyporhamphus
- Species: O. similis

Binomial name
- Oxyporhamphus similis Bruun, 1935

Species of fish

Oxyporhamphus similis, the false halfbeak, is a species of halfbeak from the family Hemiramphidae which is found in the warmer waters of the Atlantic. In the eastern Atlantic its distribution extends from Cape Verde to Angola while in the western Atlantic it occurs from New York State south through the Caribbean and Gulf of Mexico to Recife in Brazil. This species was described by the Danish ichthyologist Anton Frederik Bruun in 1935,
