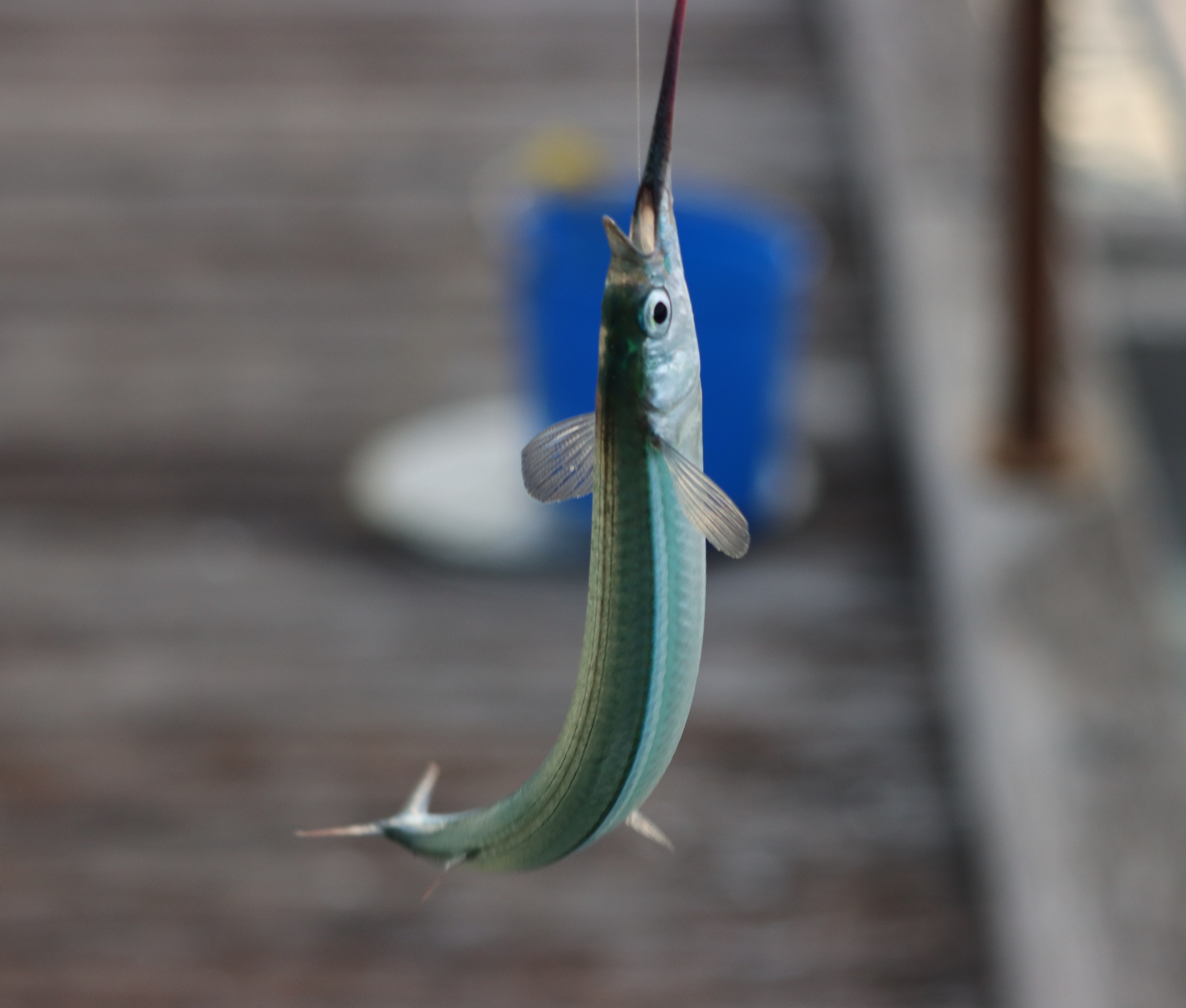

Scientific classification
- Kingdom: Animalia
- Phylum: Chordata
- Class: Actinopterygii
- Order: Beloniformes
- Family: Hemiramphidae
- Genus: Hyporhamphus
- Species: H. melanochir

Binomial name
- Hyporhamphus melanochir Valenciennes, 1847

= Hyporhamphus melanochir =

Southern sea garfish

Species of fish

Hyporhamphus melanochir, or Southern garfish or (in Australia) garfish, is a halfbeak garfish from the family Hemiramphidae. It is found in southern Australian and New Zealand waters. It is a very popular fish for recreational fishing and eating in Australia, where it is referred to simply as 'garfish' or 'gar'.

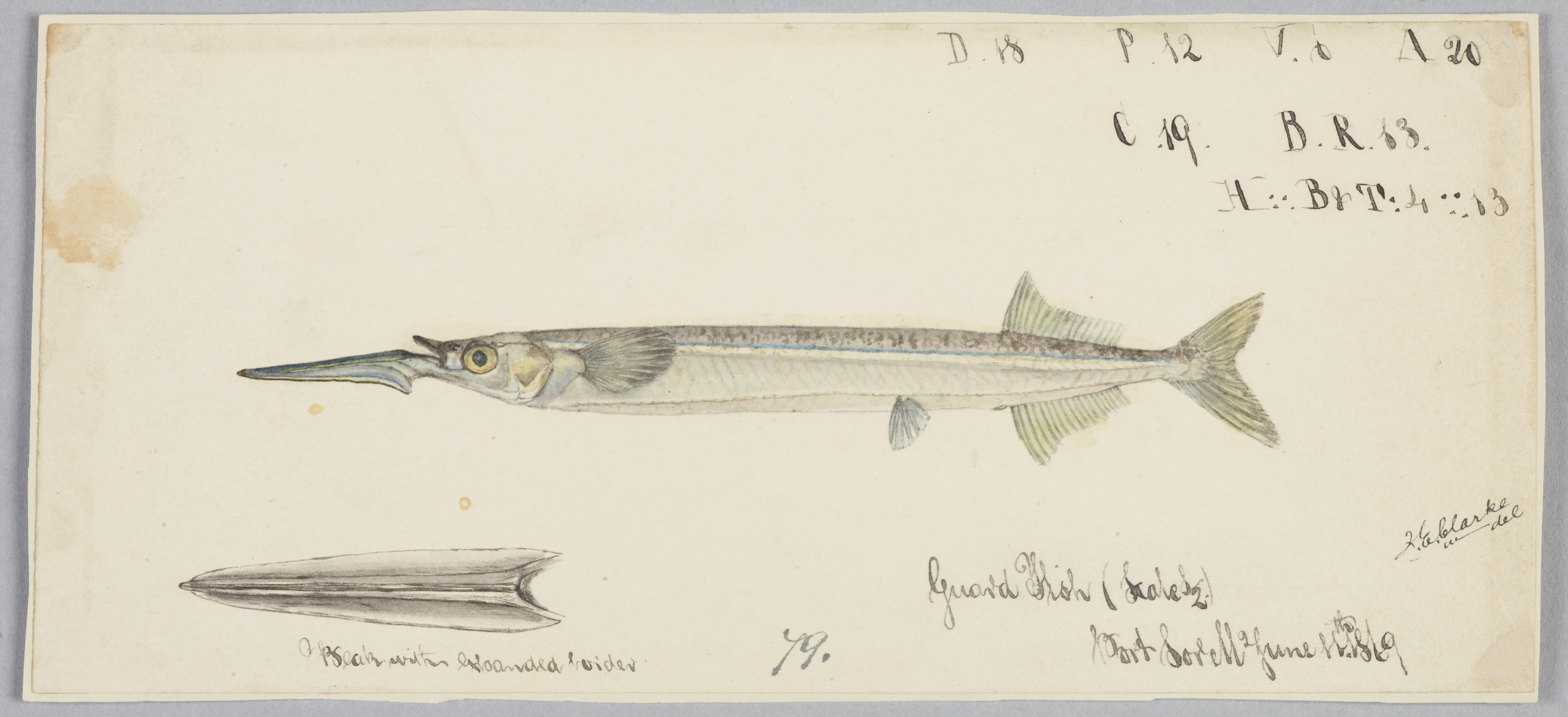
Hyporhamphus melanochir illustration by Frank Edward Clarke
