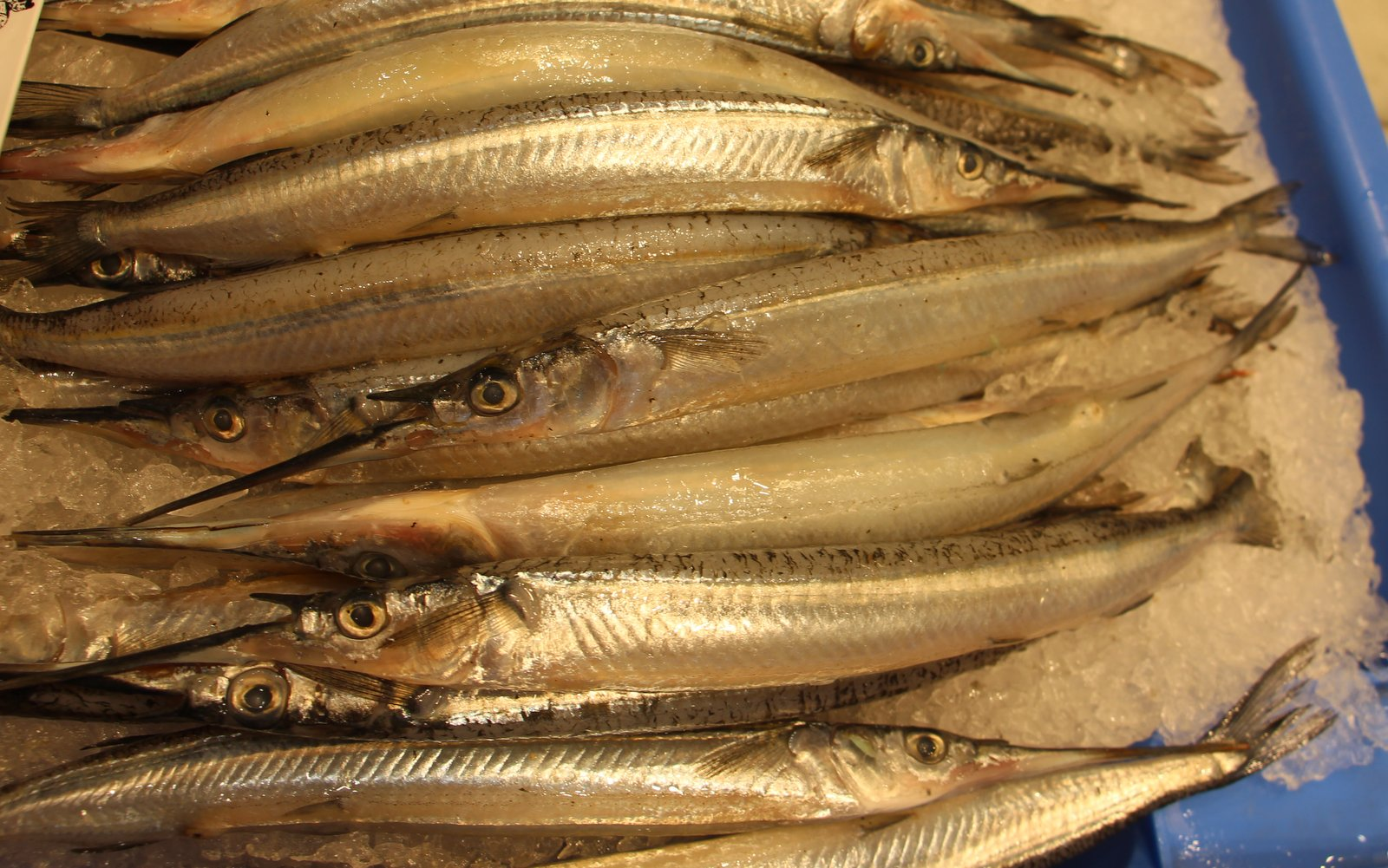

Scientific classification
- Domain: Eukaryota
- Kingdom: Animalia
- Phylum: Chordata
- Class: Actinopterygii
- Order: Beloniformes
- Family: Hemiramphidae
- Genus: Hyporhamphus
- Species: H. australis

Binomial name
- Hyporhamphus australis Steindachner, 1866

= Hyporhamphus australis =

Eastern sea garfish

Species of fish

Hyporhamphus australis is a halfbeak garfish from the family Hemiramphidae. It is found in Australian waters. Also recorded at Lord Howe Island and Norfolk Island. The species involve in schooling as an adaptation method
