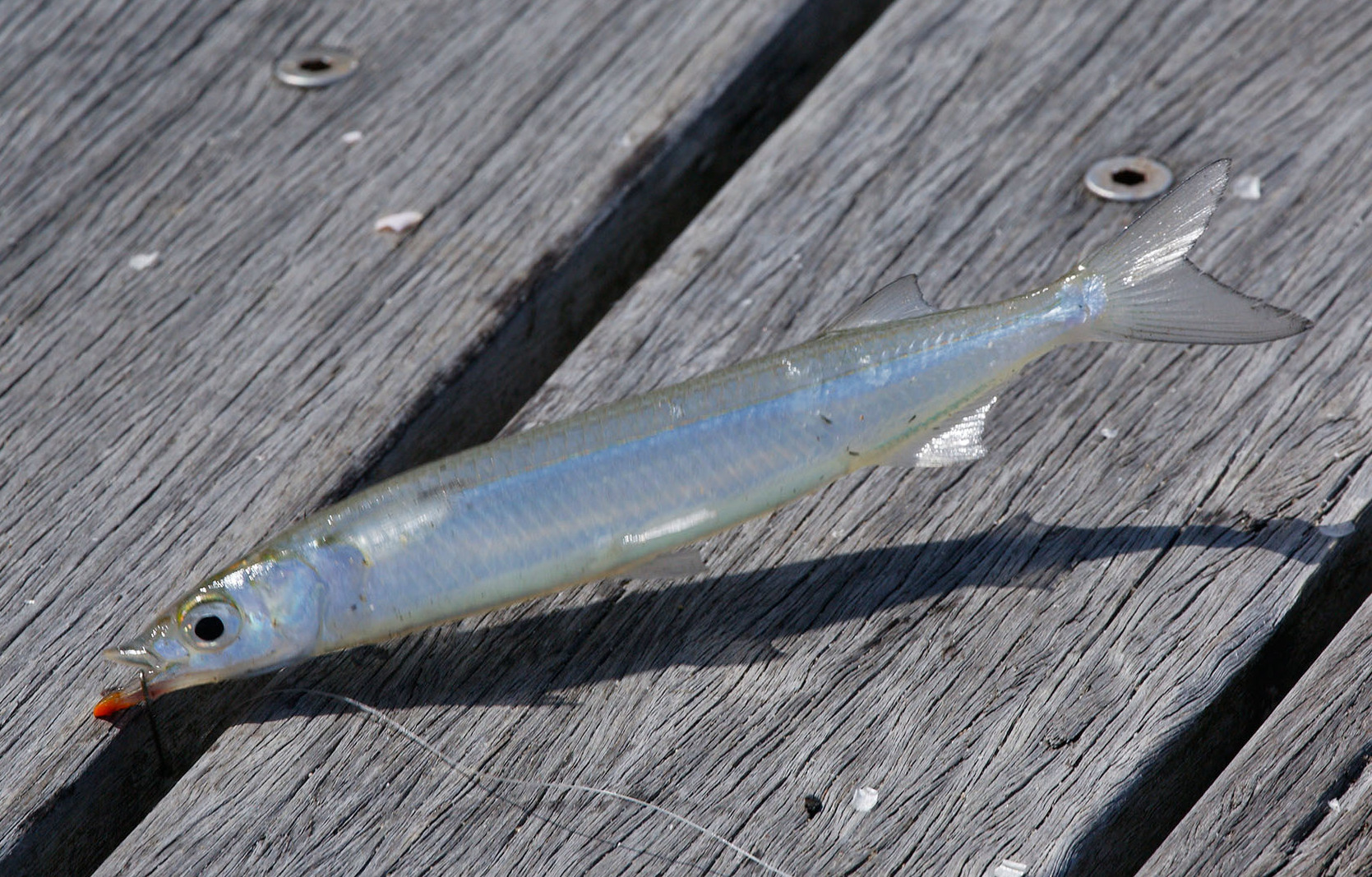

Scientific classification
- Domain: Eukaryota
- Kingdom: Animalia
- Phylum: Chordata
- Class: Actinopterygii
- Order: Beloniformes
- Family: Hemiramphidae
- Genus: Arrhamphus
- Species: A. sclerolepis

Binomial name
- Arrhamphus sclerolepis Günther, 1866

= Arrhamphus sclerolepis =

Species of fish

Arrhamphus sclerolepis, the Northern snub-nosed garfish, is a species of halfbeak in the genus Arrhamphus found in coastal waters of the Indo-West Pacific around Papua New Guinea and Australia, and in the freshwaters of adjacent river systems. Considered a good game fish, but of little commercial value either as food or as an aquarium fish. This species is known to anglers in Australia as the snub-nosed gar. The species is distinguished from most other halfbeaks by the lower jaw being only slightly longer than the upper jaw. In coastal wetlands this species feeds mainly on sea grass, with some crustaceans, but in urban waterways it feeds on algae at night and on ants during the day.

== Gallery ==
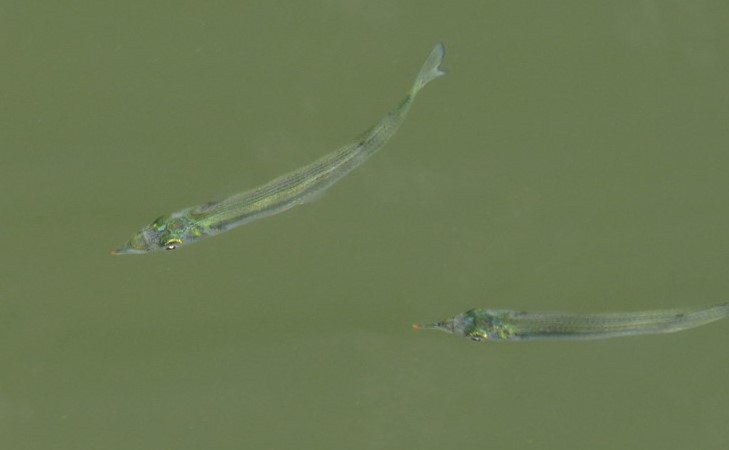

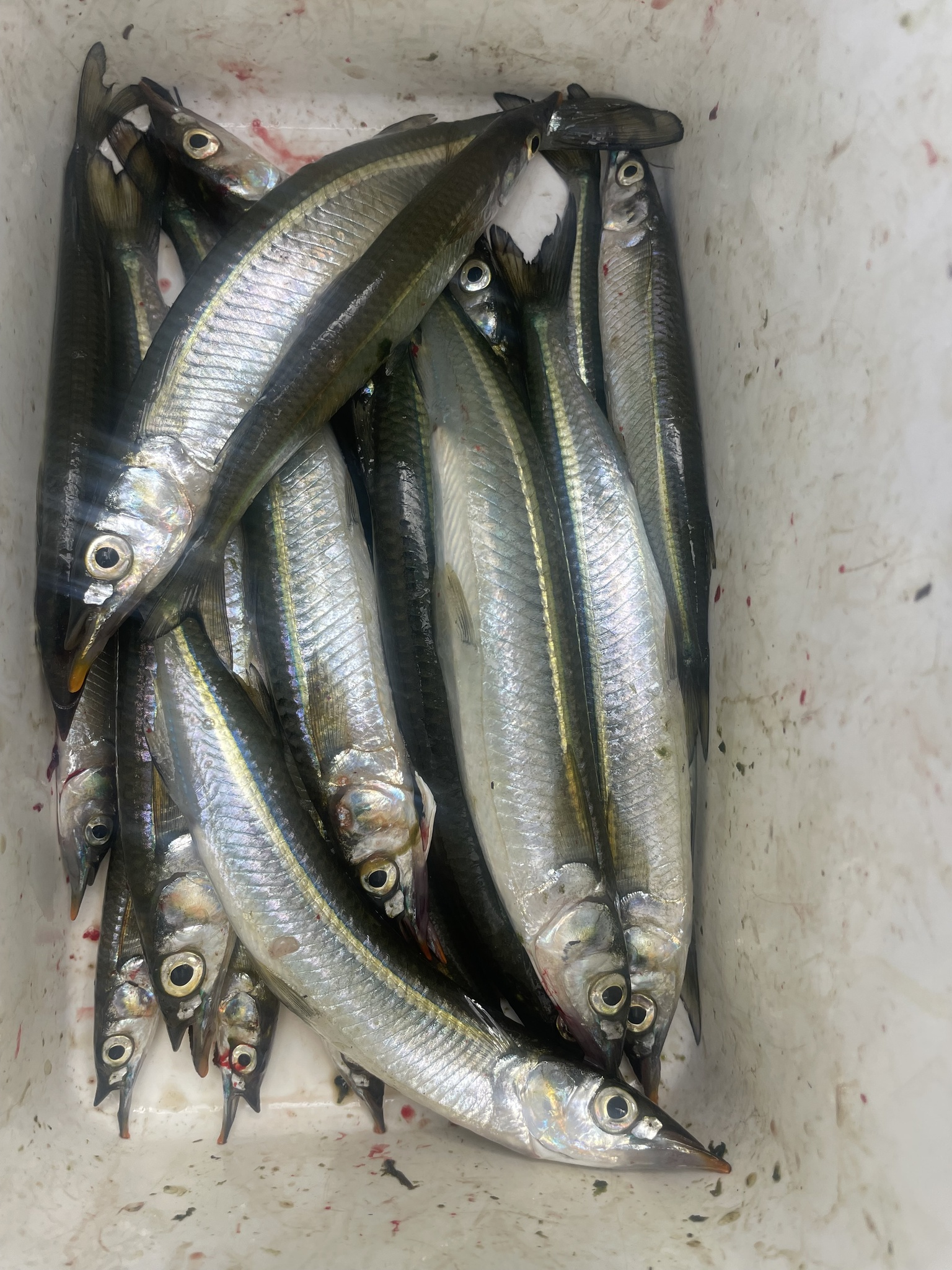

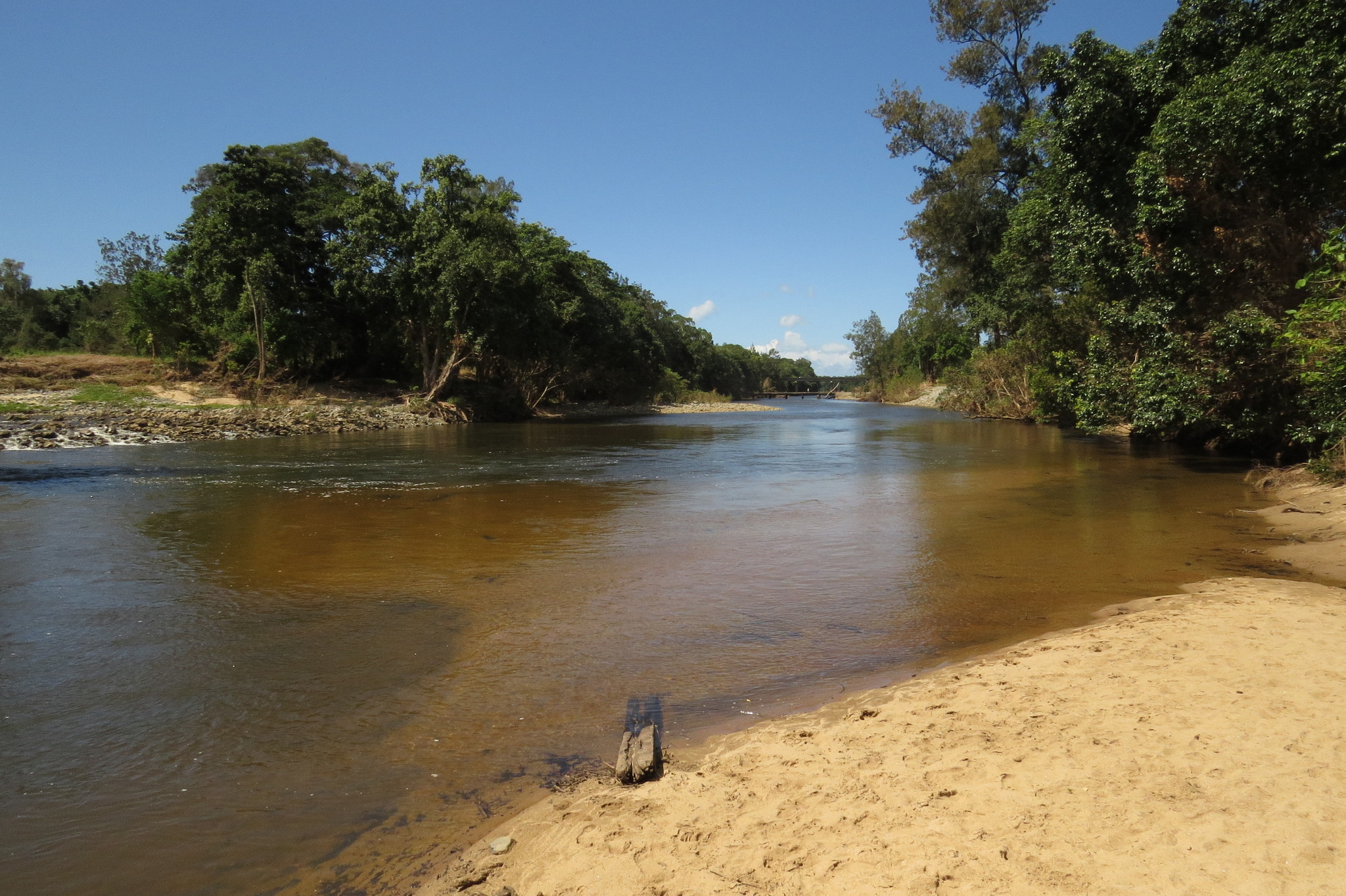
Habitat
