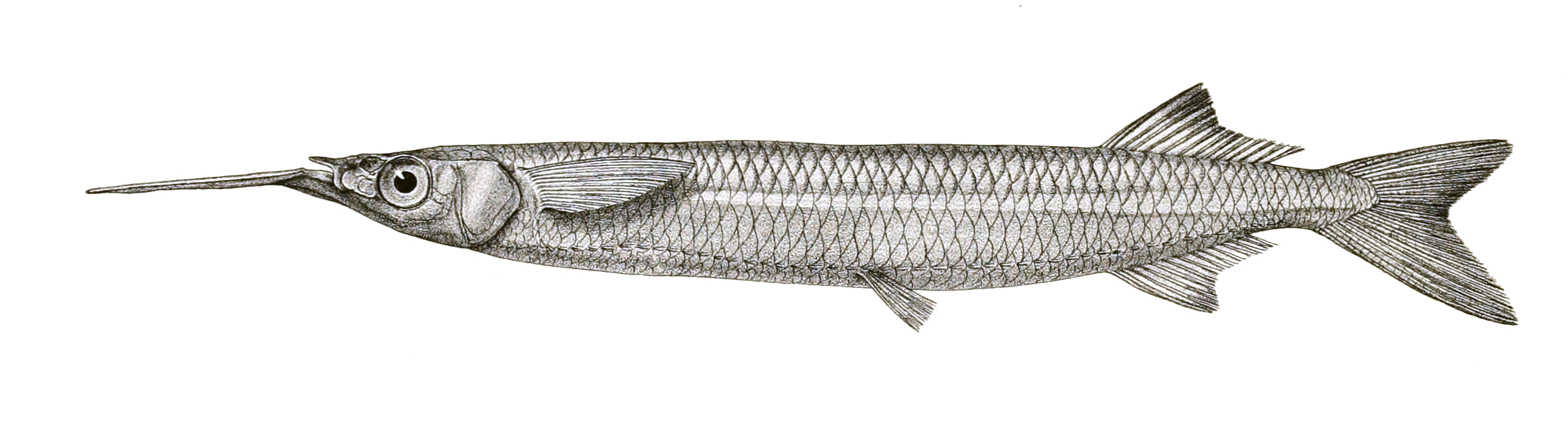

Conservation status
- Least Concern (IUCN 3.1)

Scientific classification
- Kingdom: Animalia
- Phylum: Chordata
- Class: Actinopterygii
- Order: Beloniformes
- Family: Hemiramphidae
- Genus: Hyporhamphus
- Species: H. limbatus

Binomial name
- Hyporhamphus limbatus (Valenciennes, 1847)

Synonyms
- Hemiramphus limbatus Valenciennes, 1847; Hemirhamphus limbatus Valenciennes, 1847; Hemiramphus tridentifer Cantor, 1849; Hemirhamphus sinensis Günther, 1866; Hyporhamphus sinensis (Günther, 1866); Hemiramphus gorakhpurensis Srivastava, 1967; Hyporhamphus unifasciatus (non Ranzani, 1842) misapplied; Hemiramphus gaimardi (non Valenciennes, 1847) misapplied; Hemiramphus melanurus (non Valenciennes, 1847) misapplied

= Congaturi halfbeak =

Species of fish

The Congaturi halfbeak (Hyporhamphus limbatus), also known as the Valenciennes halfbeak, is a potamodromous species of fish in the family Hemiramphidae. It is a valued commercial fish in tropical countries both dried salted and fresh forms.

== Description ==
The body shows typical halfbeak shape with an elongated lower jaw and cylindrical elongated body. They have no spines on fins, but do have 13-16 rays of their dorsal fins and 13-16 rays on their anal fins. The longest recorded Jumping halfbeak was 35 cm long, but most of them are 13 cm long commonly. Caudal fin emarginate. Body is greenish above, and a silvery lateral stripe widening posteriorly. Ventrally white in color. Fleshy tip of the beak is reddish colored.

== Distribution and habitat ==
The jumping halfbeak is found tropical waters Indo-Pacific oceans extends from Western India, around Sri Lanka, China, the Philippines. The fish also found in freshwater bodies of Cambodia and Mekong river of China. It is a surface dwelling fish that can be mostly found estuaries and lagoons.

== See also ==
- List of common commercial fish of Sri Lanka
