= Philippine snubnose halfbeak =

Scientific classification
- Kingdom: Animalia
- Phylum: Chordata
- Class: Actinopterygii
- Order: Beloniformes
- Family: Hemiramphidae
- Genus: Melapedalion; Fowler, 1934
- Species: M. breve

Binomial name
- Melapedalion breve (Seale, 1910)

Synonyms
- Oxyporhamphus brevis Seale, 1910; Arrhamphus brevis (Seale, 1910)

Species of fish

The Philippine snubnose halfbeak (Melapedalion breve) is a species of halfbeak. It is a coastal species that originates from the South China and Sulu Seas around the Philippines and Malaysia. It grows to about 22.7 centimetres (8.9 in) SL. It is the only member of its monotypic genus and was originally described as Oxyporhamphus brevis by Alvin Seale in 1910 with the type locality given as Paawacan, Palawan Island, Philippines.
