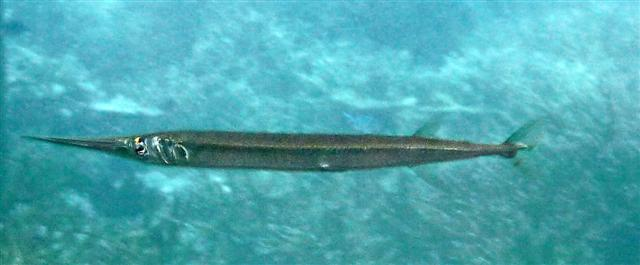

Scientific classification
- Kingdom: Animalia
- Phylum: Chordata
- Class: Actinopterygii
- Order: Beloniformes
- Family: Hemiramphidae
- Genus: Hyporhamphus
- Species: H. dussumieri

Binomial name
- Hyporhamphus dussumieri (Valenciennes, 1847)

Synonyms
- Hemiramphus dussumieri Valenciennes, 1847; Hemiramphus reynaldi Valenciennes, 1847; Hemiramphus laticeps Günther, 1866; Hyporhamphus laticeps (Günther, 1866); Hyporhamphus samoensis Steindachner, 1906

= Dussumier's halfbeak =

Species of fish

The Dussumier's halfbeak (Hyporhamphus dussumieri), also known as the slender garfish, lives in reefs and shallow lagoons. It is an Indo-Pacific species which is found from the Seychelles east to the Tuamotu Islands, north to Hong Kong and Okinawa and south to northern Australia. They form schools which are found near the surface of lagoons and seaward reefs. The longest known specimen was 38.0 cm in length. This species was described by Achille Valenciennes in 1847 with the type locality given as the Seychelles. The specific name honours the French voyager and merchant Jean-Jacques Dussumier (1792–1883).
