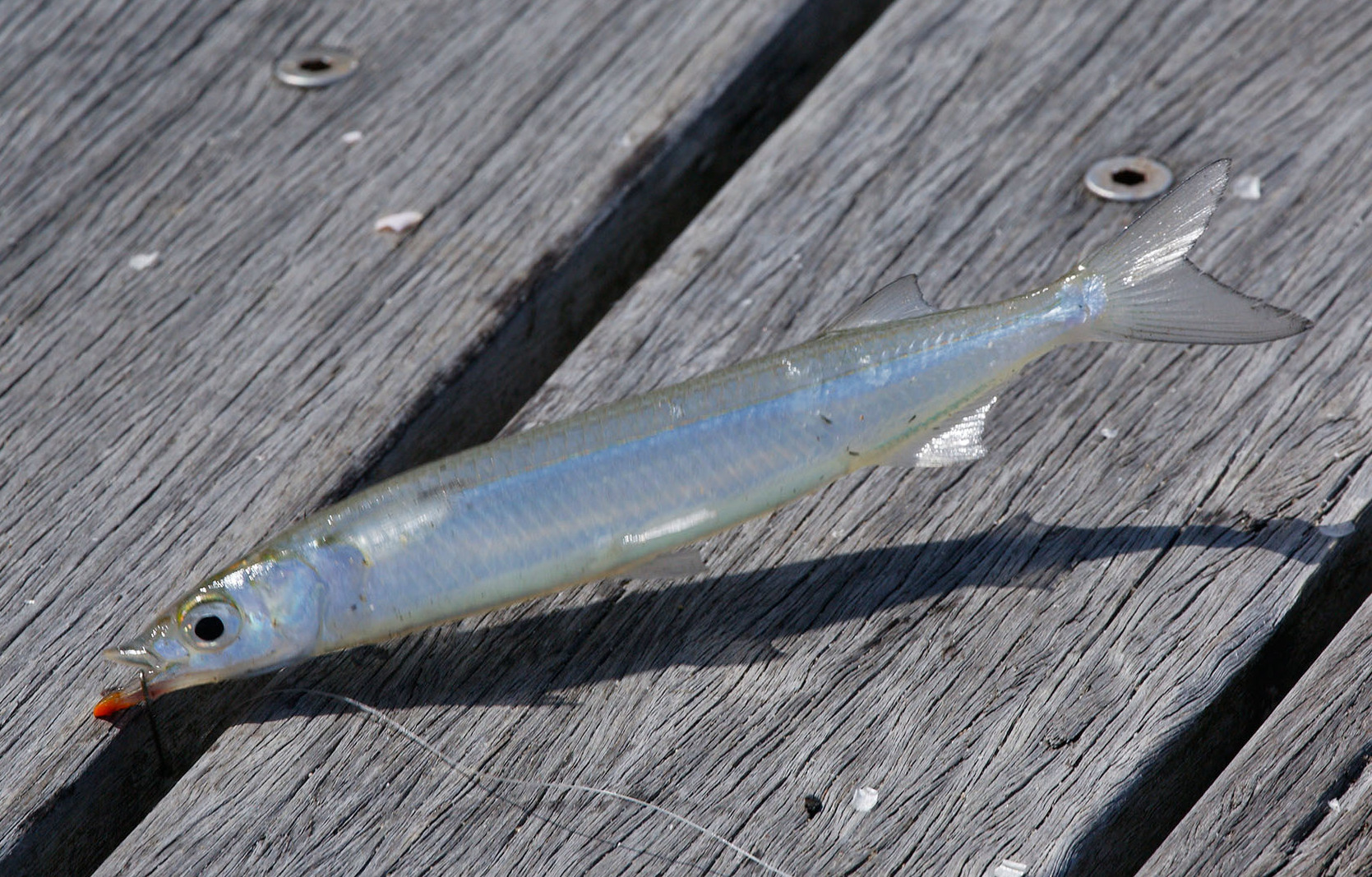
- Arrhamphus sclerolepis

Scientific classification
- Kingdom: Animalia
- Phylum: Chordata
- Class: Actinopterygii
- Order: Beloniformes
- Family: Hemiramphidae
- Genus: Arrhamphus; Günther, 1866

Type species
- Arrhamphus sclerolepis Günther, 1866

= Arrhamphus =

Genus of fishes

Arrhamphus is a small genus of halfbeaks from the family Hemiramphidae from the coasts of Australia, the two species in the genus were formerly considered to be conspecific.

== Species ==
The two species of Arrhamphus are:

- Arrhamphus krefftii (Steindachner, 1867) (Snubnose garfish)
- Arrhamphus sclerolepis Günther, 1866 (Northern snubnose garfish)
