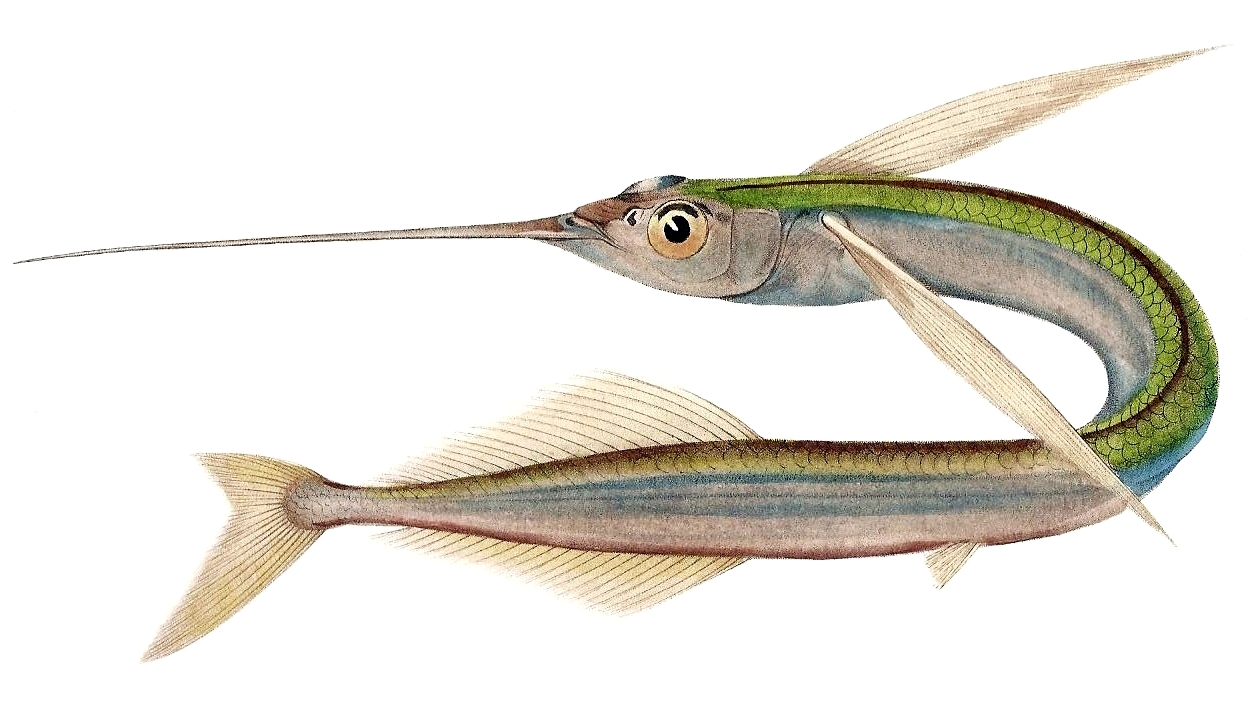
- Euleptorhamphus viridis

Scientific classification
- Kingdom: Animalia
- Phylum: Chordata
- Class: Actinopterygii
- Order: Beloniformes
- Family: Hemiramphidae
- Genus: Euleptorhamphus; T. N. Gill, 1859

Type species
- Euleptorhamphus brevoortii T. N. Gill, 1859

= Euleptorhamphus =

Euleptorhamphus Temporal range: 11–0 Ma Late Miocene to Present

Genus of fishes

Euleptorhamphus is a genus of halfbeaks (family Hemiramphidae) in the order Beloniformes.

== Species ==
There are currently two recognized species in this genus:

- Euleptorhamphus velox Poey, 1868 (Flying halfbeak)
- Euleptorhamphus viridis (van Hasselt, 1823) (Ribbon halfbeak)

Both of these species are marine. E. velox occurs in coastal and oceanic waters from the western Atlantic from New England south through the Gulf of Mexico and Caribbean Sea to Recife, Brazil and eastern Atlantic from the Cape Verde Islands, Sierra Leone, and Nigeria. E. viridis is widely distributed in tropical and subtropical waters of the Indo-Pacific. It is usually oceanic, but enters large open bays and is also found around islands.

Euleptorhamphus velox may reach up to 61.0 centimetres (24.0 in) TL. E. viridis may grow up to 53.0 cm (20.9 in) TL.

Euleptorhamphus viridis is able to jump out of the water and fly short distances, by twisting the back half of its body 90° so its symmetrical dorsal and anal fins can act as a pair of gliding wings.
