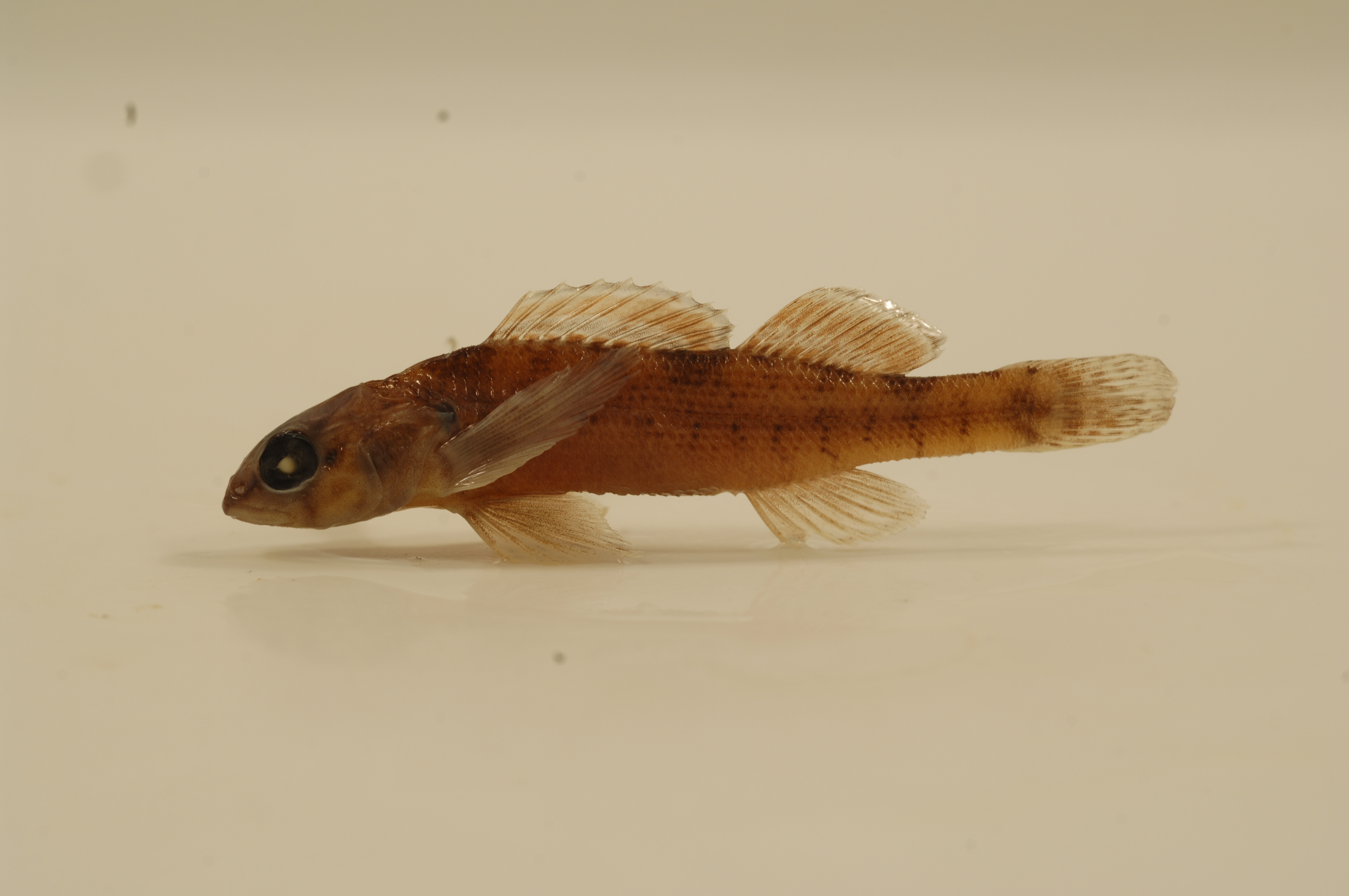

Conservation status
- Least Concern (IUCN 3.1)

Scientific classification
- Kingdom: Animalia
- Phylum: Chordata
- Class: Actinopterygii
- Order: Perciformes
- Family: Percidae
- Genus: Etheostoma
- Species: E. collettei

Binomial name
- Etheostoma collettei (Birdsong & Knapp, 1969)

= Creole darter =

Species of fish

The Creole darter (Etheostoma collettei) is a species of freshwater ray-finned fish, a darter from the subfamily Etheostomatinae, part of the family Percidae, which also contains the perches, ruffes and pikeperches. It is endemic to the Eastern United States, where it occurs in the Ouachita, Red, Calcasieu and Sabine River drainages in Arkansas and Louisiana. It inhabits gravel riffles, current-swept vegetation and debris in creeks and small to medium rivers. This species can reach a length of 7.4 cm (2.9 in). The creole darter was first formally described in 1969 by Ray S. Bridsong and Leslie William Knapp with the type locality given as the Dugdemona River, Jackson Parish, Louisiana.

== Etymology ==
The specific name honours of the American ichthyologist Bruce Baden Collette, then of the Bureau of Commercial Fisheries Systematics Labroratory, to recognise his contribution to the study of the fishes of the perch family.
