= Chriodorus =

Hardhead halfbeak

Conservation status
- Least Concern (IUCN 3.1)

Scientific classification
- Kingdom: Animalia
- Phylum: Chordata
- Class: Actinopterygii
- Order: Beloniformes
- Family: Hemiramphidae
- Genus: Chriodorus; Goode & T. H. Bean, 1882
- Species: C. atherinoides

Binomial name
- Chriodorus atherinoides Goode & Bean, 1882

Species of fish

Chriodorus atherinoides (hardhead halfbeak) is a species of halfbeak found in coastal waters of the western Atlantic Ocean from southern United States to Mexico including Cuba and the Bahamas. This species is euryhaline and frequently migrates up rivers. It is of no commercial value. Unlike most other halfbeaks, the upper and lower jaws are of a similar size.
