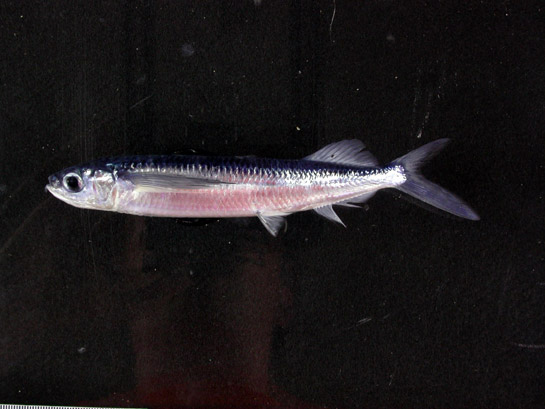
- Oxyporhamphus micropterus

Scientific classification
- Kingdom: Animalia
- Phylum: Chordata
- Class: Actinopterygii
- Division: Teleostei
- Order: Beloniformes
- Family: Hemiramphidae
- Genus: Oxyporhamphus; Gill, 1864

Type species
- Hemiramphus cuspidatus Valenciennes, 1847

= Oxyporhamphus =

Genus of fishes

Oxyporhamphus is a genus of halfbeaks from the family Hemiramphidae. This genus contains two species, one in the warmer waters of the Atlantic and the other in the Indo-Pacific region.

== Species ==
- Oxyporhamphus micropterus (Valenciennes, 1847) (bigwing halfbeak) - Indo-Pacific
- Oxyporhamphus similis Bruun, 1935 (false halfbeak) - Atlantic
