= Seth Eugene Meek =

American ichthyologist

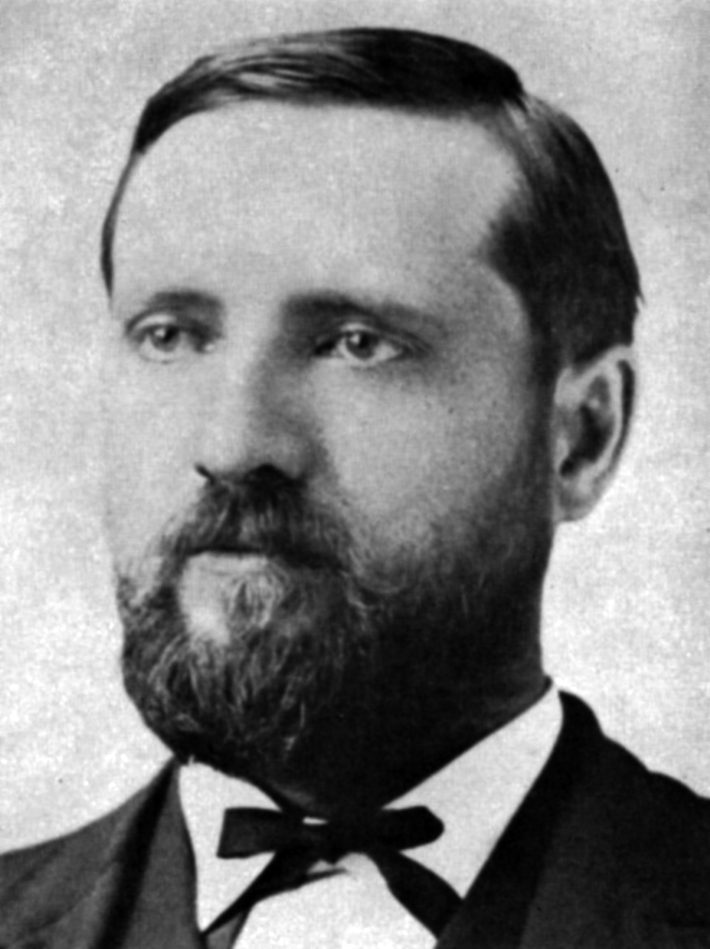
Seth Eugene Meek

Seth Eugene Meek (April 1, 1859, Hicksville, Ohio – July 6, 1914, Chicago) was an American ichthyologist at the Field Museum of Natural History in Chicago. He was the first compiler of a book on Mexican freshwater fishes. Together with his assistant, Samuel F. Hildebrand, he produced the first book on the freshwater fishes of Panama.

He often collaborated with Charles H. Gilbert, and in 1884 on a collecting trip through the Ozarks, they discovered a new species, Etheostoma nianguae, which only lives in the Osage River basin. Also with them on that excursion was David Starr Jordan, considered the father of modern ichthyology.

After the Ozarks trip, Meek accepted the post of professor of biology and geology at Arkansas Industrial University (now the University of Arkansas).

== Taxon named after him ==
- The American halfbeak was named in his honor Hyporhamphus meeki,

as were:

- the Mezquital pupfish (Cyprinodon meeki)
- The firemouth cichlid (Thorichthys meeki)
- Eucinostomus meeki C. H. Eigenmann
- Priacanthus meeki O. P. Jenkins, 1903
- Brycon meeki C. H. Eigenmann & Hildebrand, 1918
- The Sicklefin chub, 'Macrhybopsis meeki is a species of ray-finned minnow fish in the family Cyprinidae. It is found only in the United States.

== See also ==
- Biological Survey of Panama (1910 to 1912)
- Category:Taxa named by Seth Eugene Meek
