= Bruce Baden Collette =

American zoologist and ichthyologist

- Born: March 14, 1934 (age 92); Brooklyn, New York, U. S.
- Education: Cornell University
- Scientific career
- Fields: Ichthyology
- Author abbrev. (zoology): Collette

Bruce Baden Collette (born March 13, 1934) is an American ichthyologist.

== Biography ==
He was born on March 13, 1934, in Brooklyn, New York. He is the son of Raymond Hill Collette and Agnes Hellen (Lavsen) Collette.

== Publications ==
- The diversity of fishes : biology, evolution, and ecology (with Gene S. Helfman and Douglas E. Facey); Malden (Mass.) : Blackwell science, cop. 2009.
- Results of the Tektite Program: ecology of coral reef fishes (with Sylvia Alice Earle); Natural History Museum, Los Angeles County, 1972.

== Taxon named in his honor ==
- The creole darter (Etheostoma collettei) was named in his honour in 1969,
- The toadfish genus Colletteichthys was named in 2006 in his honour too.

== Taxon described by him ==
- See Category:Taxa named by Bruce Baden Collette
