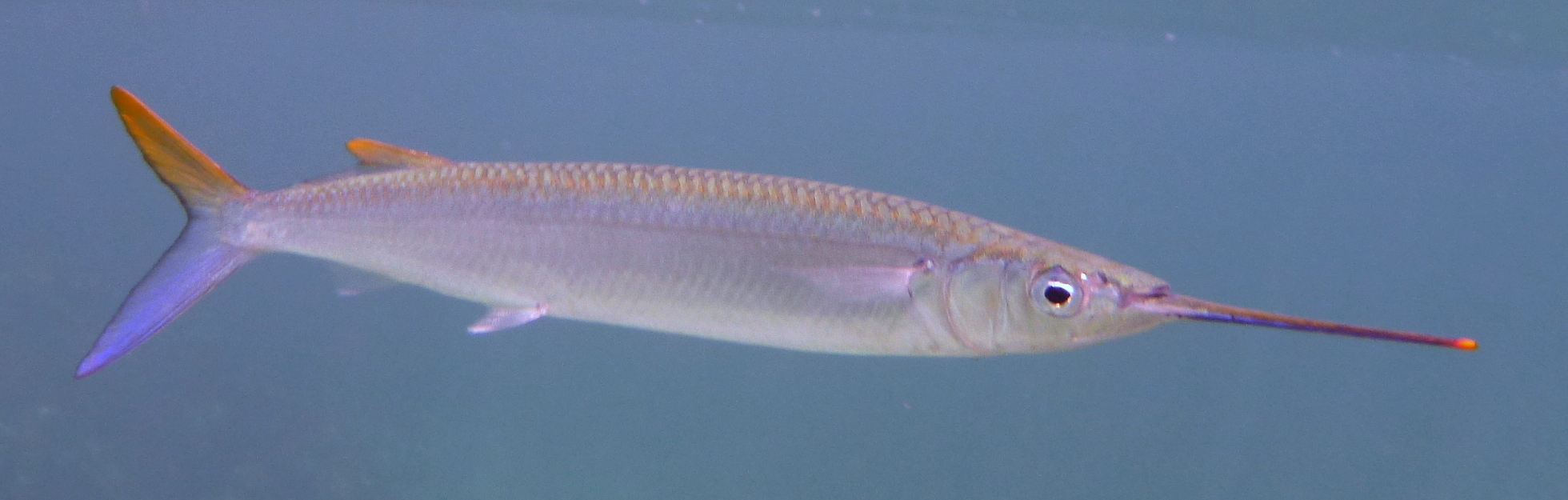
- Ballyhoo (Hemiramphus brasiliensis), a marine halfbeak

Scientific classification
- Kingdom: Animalia
- Phylum: Chordata
- Class: Actinopterygii
- Division: Teleostei
- Order: Beloniformes
- Superfamily: Exocoetoidea
- Family: Hemiramphidae; T. N. Gill, 1859

Genera
- Hemiramphidae s.str.; Hemiramphus; Oxyporhamphus; Euleptorhamphidae; Euleptorhamphus; Rhynchorhamphus; "hyporhamphids"; Arrhamphus; Chriodorus; Hyporhamphus; Melapedalion

Cladistically included but traditionally excluded taxa
- Exocoetidae

= Halfbeak =

Halfbeak Temporal range: Early Eocene to present

Family of fishes

Hemiramphidae is a family of fishes that are commonly called halfbeaks, spipe fish or spipefish. They are a geographically widespread and numerically abundant family of epipelagic fish inhabiting warm waters around the world. The halfbeaks are named for their distinctive jaws, in which the lower jaws are significantly longer than the upper jaws. The similar viviparous halfbeaks (family Zenarchopteridae) have often been included in this family.

Though not commercially important themselves, these forage fish support artisanal fisheries and local markets worldwide. They are also fed upon by other commercially important predatory fishes, such as billfishes, mackerels, and sharks.

== Taxonomy ==
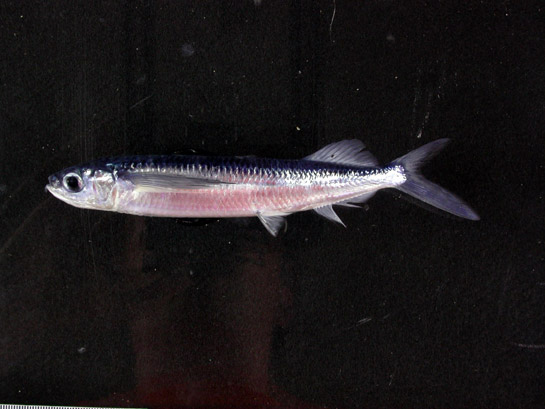
Oxyporhamphus micropterus has been considered either a halfbeak or a flyingfish.

In 1758, Carl Linnaeus was the first to scientifically describe a halfbeak, Esox brasiliensis (now Hemiramphus brasiliensis). In 1775 Peter Forsskål described two more species as Esox, Esox far and Esox marginatus. In 1816, Georges Cuvier created the genus Hemiramphus; from then on, all three were classified as Hemiramphus. In 1859, Theodore Nicholas Gill erected the Hemiramphidae, deriving their name from Hemiramphus, the family's type genus. The name comes from the Greek hemi, meaning half, and rhamphos, meaning beak or bill.

Currently, eight genera (including 60 species) are placed within the family Hemiramphidae:

- Arrhamphus Günther, 1866
- Chriodorus Goode & Bean, 1882
- Euleptorhamphus Gill, 1859
- Hemiramphus Cuvier, 1816
- Hyporhamphus Gill, 1859
- Melapedalion Fowler, 1934
- Oxyporhamphus Gill, 1864
- Rhynchorhamphus Fowler, 1928

This family is primarily marine and found in the Atlantic, Pacific, and Indian Oceans, though some inhabit estuaries and rivers.

== Evolution ==
The halfbeaks' fossil record extends into the Lower Tertiary. The earliest known halfbeak is "Hemiramphus" edwardsi from the Eocene at Monte Bolca, Italy, although its attribution to the extant Hemiramphus is doubtful. Apart from differences in the length of the upper and lower jaws, recent and fossil halfbeaks are distinguished by the fusion of the third pair of upper pharyngeal bones into a plate.

== Phylogeny ==
- - - Belonidae+Scomberesocidae
    - Zenarchopteridae
  - - Hemiramphidae
    - Exocoetidae
- Adrianichthyidae

Phylogeny of the halfbeaks.

The phylogeny of the halfbeaks is in a state of flux.

On the one hand, there is little question that they are most closely related to three other families of streamlined, surface water fishes: the flyingfishes, needlefishes, and sauries. Traditionally, these four families have been taken to comprise the order Beloniformes. The halfbeaks and flyingfishes are considered to form one group, the superfamily Exocoetoidea, and the needlefishes and sauries another, the superfamily Scomberesocoidea.

On the other hand, recent studies have demonstrated that rather than forming a single monophyletic group (a clade), the halfbeak family actually includes a number of lineages ancestral to the flyingfishes and the needlefishes. In other words, as traditionally defined, the halfbeak family is paraphyletic.

Within the subfamily Hemiramphinae, the "flying halfbeak" genus Oxyporhamphus has proved to be particularly problematic; while morphologically closer to the flyingfishes, molecular evidence places it with Hemiramphus and Euleptorhamphus. Together, these three genera form the sister group to the flyingfish family. The other two hemiramphine genera Hyporhamphus and Arrhamphus form another clade of less clear placement.

Rather than being closely related to the flyingfishes, the subfamily Zenarchopterinae appears to be the sister group of the needlefishes and sauries. This is based on the pharyngeal jaw apparatus, sperm ultrastructure, and molecular evidence. However, this hypothesis has awkward implications for how the morphological evolution of the group is understood, because the fused pharyngeal plate has been considered reliably diagnostic of the halfbeak family. Furthermore, the existing theory that because juvenile needlefish pass through a developmental stage where the lower jaw is longer than the upper jaw (the so-called "halfbeak stage") the theory that halfbeaks are paedomorphic needlefish is untenable. In fact the unequal lengths of the upper and lower jaws of halfbeaks appears to be the basal condition, with needlefish being relatively derived in comparison.

== Morphology ==
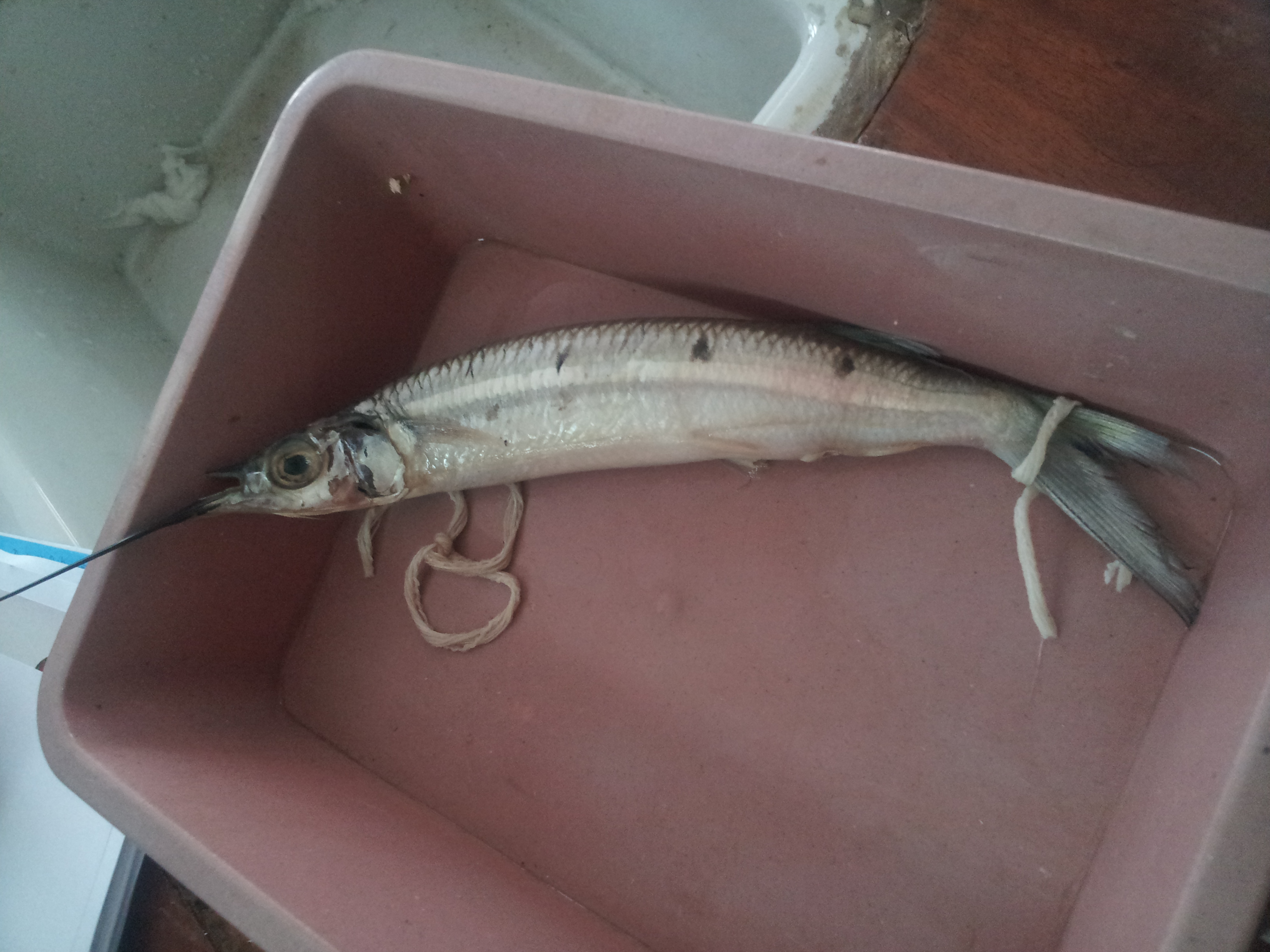
Preserved specimen

The halfbeaks are elongated, streamlined fish adapted to living in open water. They can grow to over 40 cm (16 in) in standard length in the case of Euleptorhampus viridis. Their scales are relatively large, cycloid (smooth), and easily detached. No spines are in the fins. A distinguishing characteristic is that the third pair of upper pharyngeal bones is anklylosed (fused) into a plate. Halfbeaks are one of several fish families that lack a stomach, all of which possess a pharyngeal jaw apparatus (pharyngeal mill). Most species have an extended lower jaw, at least as juveniles, though this feature may be lost as the fish mature, as with Chriodorus, for example.

As is typical for surface-dwelling, open-water fish, most species are silvery, darker above and lighter below, an example of countershading. The tip of the lower jaw is bright red or orange in most species.

Halfbeaks carry several adaptations to feeding at the water surface. The eyes and nostrils are at the top of the head, and the upper jaw is mobile, but not the lower jaw. Combined with their streamlined shape and the concentration of fins towards the back (similar to that of a pike), these adaptations allow halfbeaks to locate, catch, and swallow food items very effectively.

== Range and habitat ==
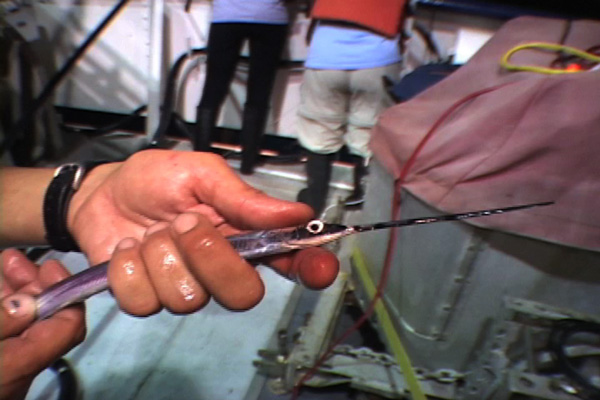
A marine halfbeak, Hemiramphus balao

Halfbeaks inhabit warm seas, predominantly at the surface, in the Atlantic, Indian, and Pacific Oceans. A few are found in estuaries. Most species of marine halfbeaks are known from continental coastlines, but some extend into the western and central Pacific, and one species (Hyporhamphus ihi) is endemic to New Zealand. Hemiramphus is a worldwide marine genus.

== Ecology and behavior ==
=== Feeding ===
Marine halfbeaks are omnivores feeding on algae, marine plants such as seagrasses, plankton, invertebrates such as pteropods and crustaceans, and smaller fishes. For some subtropical species, at least, juveniles are more predatory than adults. Some tropical species feed on animals during the day and plants at night, while other species alternate between carnivory in the summer and herbivory in the winter. They are, in turn, eaten by many ecologically and commercially important fish, such as billfish, mackerel, and sharks, so are a key link between trophic levels.

=== Behavior ===
Marine halfbeaks are typically pelagic, schooling, forage fish. The southern sea garfish, Hyporhamphus melanochir for example, is found in sheltered bays, coastal seas, and estuaries around southern Australia in waters down to 20 m (66 ft). These fish school near the surface at night, but swim closer to the sea floor during the day, particularly among beds of seagrasses. Genetic analyses of the different subpopulations of the eastern sea garfish Hyporhamphus melanochir in South Australian coastal waters reveal a small but consistent migration of individuals among them, sufficient to keep them genetically homogeneous.

Some marine halfbeaks, including Euleptorhamphus velox and E. viridis, are known for their ability to jump out of the water and glide over the surface for considerable distances, and have consequently sometimes been called flying halfbeaks'.

=== Reproduction ===
Hemiramphidae species are all external fertilizers. They are usually egg-layers and often produce relatively small numbers of fairly large eggs for fish of their size, typically in shallow coastal waters, such as the seagrass meadows of Florida Bay. The eggs of Hemiramphus brasiliensis and H. balao are typically 1.5–2.5 mm (0.059–0.098 in) in diameter and have attaching filaments. They hatch when they grow to about 4.8–11 mm (0.19–0.43 in) in diameter. Hyporhamphus melanochir eggs are slightly larger, around 2.9 mm (0.11 in) in diameter, and are unusually large when they hatch, being up to 8.5 mm (0.33 in) in size.

Relatively little is known about the ecology of juvenile marine halfbeaks, though estuarine habitats seem to be favored by at least some species. The southern sea garfish Hyporhamphus melanochir grows rapidly at first, attaining a length up to 30 cm (12 in) in the first three years, after which growth slows. This species lives for a maximum age of about 9 years, when the fish reach up to 40 cm (16 in) and weigh about 0.35 kg (0.77 lb).

== Relationship to humans ==
=== Halfbeak fisheries ===
Halfbeaks are not a major target for commercial fisheries, though small fisheries for them exist in some places, for example in South Australia, where fisheries target the southern sea garfish (Hyporhamphus melanochir). and the eastern sea garfish (Hyporhamphus australis). Halfbeaks are caught by a variety of methods, including seines and pelagic trawls, dip-netting under lights at night, and haul nets. They are used fresh, dried, smoked, or salted, and they are considered good eating. Even when halfbeaks are targeted by fisheries, though, they tend to be of secondary importance compared with other edible fish species.

In some localities, significant bait fisheries exist to supply sport fishermen. One study of a bait fishery in Florida that targets Hemiramphus brasiliensis and H. balao suggests that despite increases in the size of the fishery, the population is stable and the annual catch is valued at around $500,000.

== See also ==
- USS Halfbeak - an American submarine named after these fish
- USS Balao - another US submarine (and class) named after a Hemiramphidae species
