= Fish locomotion =

Ways that fish move around

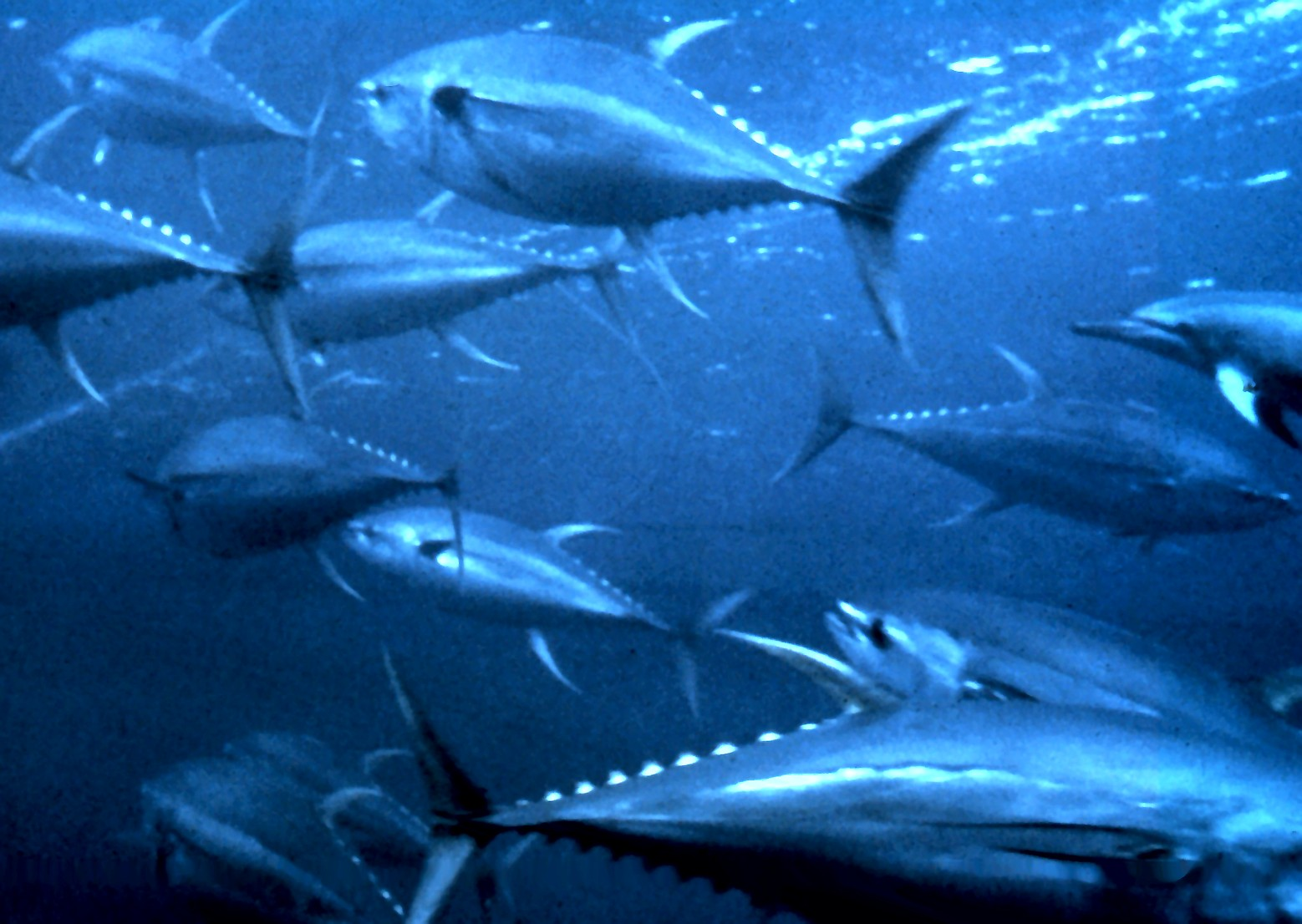
Fish, like these yellowfin tuna, use many different mechanisms to propel themselves through water

Fish locomotion is the various types of animal locomotion used by fish, principally by swimming. This is achieved in different groups of fish by a variety of mechanisms of propulsion, most often by wave-like lateral flexions of the fish's body and tail in the water, and in various specialised fish by motions of the fins. The major forms of locomotion in fish are:

- Anguilliform, in which a wave passes evenly along a long slender body;
- Sub-carangiform, in which the wave increases quickly in amplitude towards the tail;
- Carangiform, in which the wave is concentrated near the tail, which oscillates rapidly;
- Thunniform, rapid swimming with a large powerful crescent-shaped tail; and
- Ostraciiform, with almost no oscillation except of the tail fin.

More specialized fish include movement by pectoral fins with a mainly stiff body, opposed sculling with dorsal and anal fins, as in the sunfish; and movement by propagating a wave along the long fins with a motionless body, as in the knifefish or featherbacks.

In addition, some fish can variously "walk" (i.e., crawl over land using the pectoral and pelvic fins), burrow in mud, leap out of the water and even glide temporarily through the air.

== Swimming ==
=== Mechanism ===
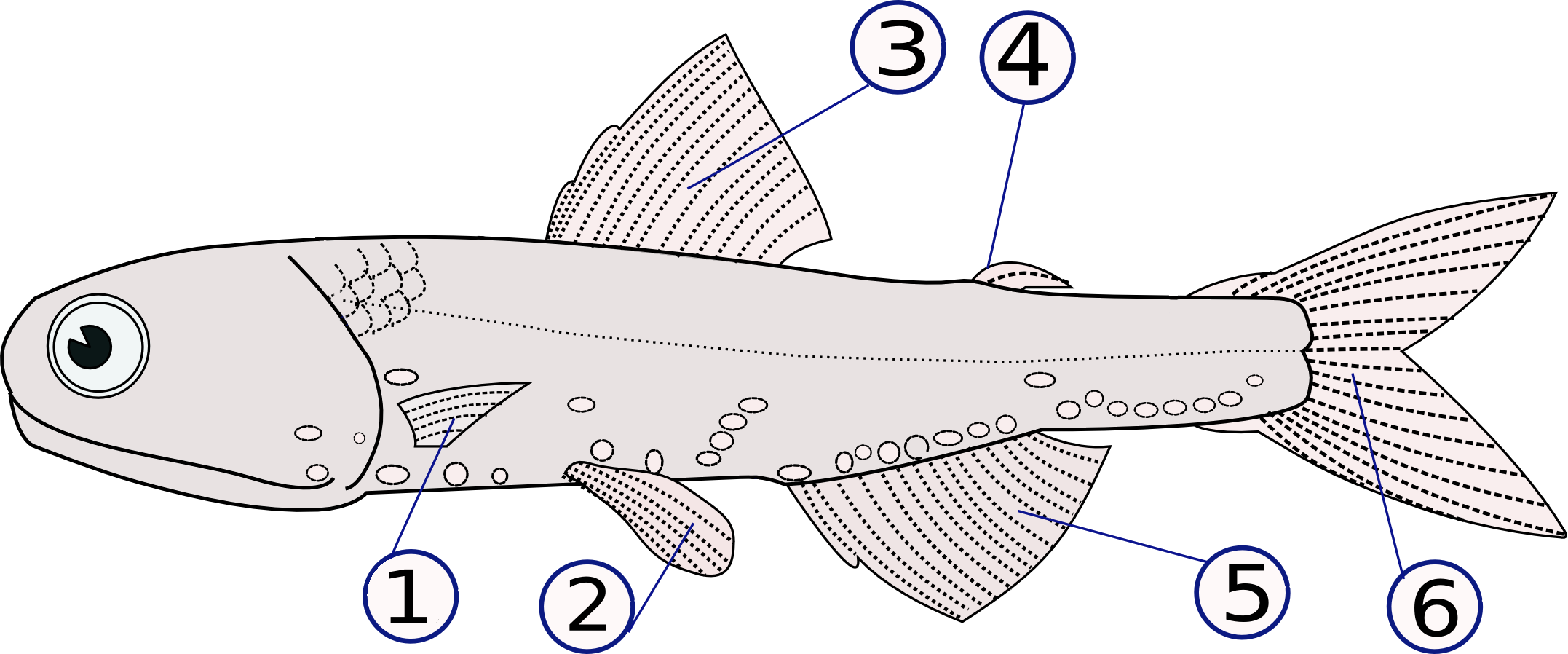
Fins used for locomotion: (1) pectoral fins (paired), (2) pelvic fins (paired), (3) dorsal fin, (4) adipose fin, (5) anal fin, (6) caudal (tail) fin

Fish swim by exerting force against the surrounding water. There are exceptions, but this is normally achieved by the fish contracting muscles on either side of its body in order to generate waves of flexion that travel the length of the body from nose to tail, generally getting larger as they go along. The vector forces exerted on the water by such motion cancel out laterally, but generate a net force backwards which in turn pushes the fish forward through the water. Most fishes generate thrust using lateral movements of their body and caudal fin, but many other species move mainly using their median and paired fins. The latter group swim slowly, but can turn rapidly, as is needed when living in coral reefs for example. But they can not swim as fast as fish using their bodies and caudal fins.

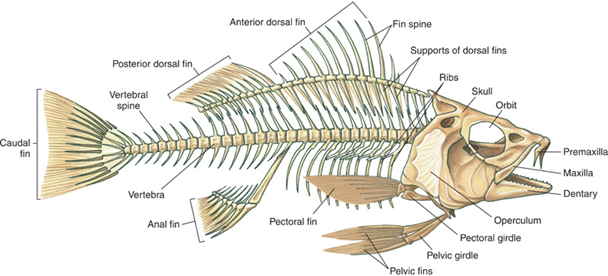
Skeletal anatomy of Tilapia

Consider the tilapia shown in the diagram. Like most fish, the tilapia has a streamlined body shape reducing water resistance to movement and enabling the tilapia to cut easily through water. Its head is inflexible, which helps it maintain forward thrust. Its scales overlap and point backwards, allowing water to pass over the fish without unnecessary obstruction. Water friction is further reduced by mucus which tilapia secrete over their body.

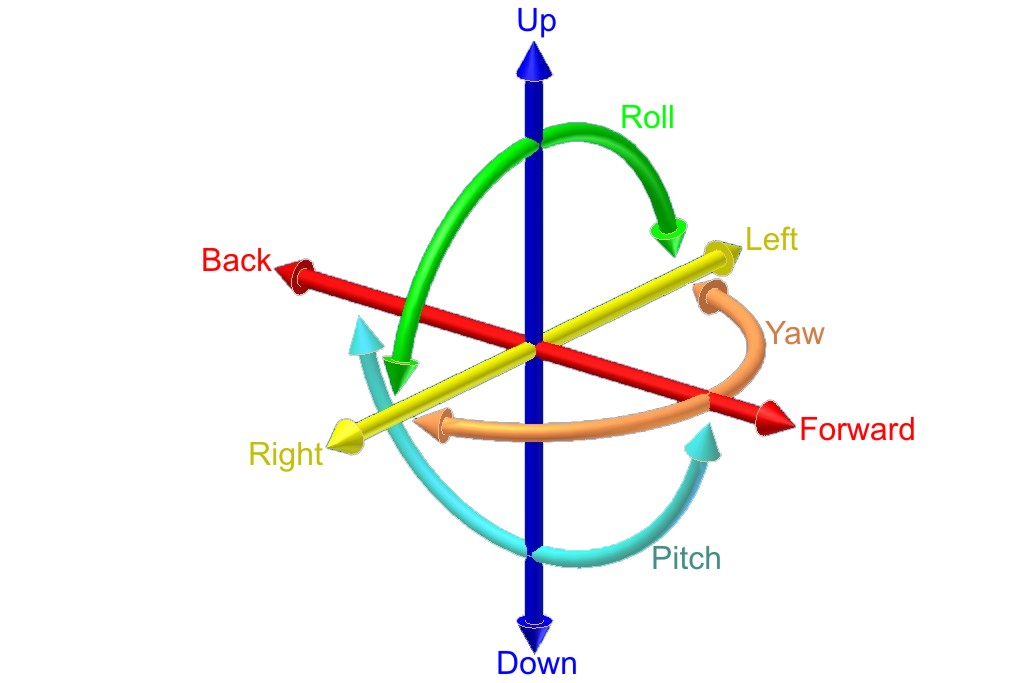
Like a plane or submarine, a fish has six degrees of freedom.

The backbone is flexible, allowing muscles to contract and relax rhythmically and bring about undulating movement. A swim bladder provides buoyancy which helps the fish adjust its vertical position in the water column. A lateral line system allows it to detect vibrations and pressure changes in water, helping the fish to respond appropriately to external events.

Well developed fins are used for maintaining balance, braking and changing direction. The pectoral fins act as pivots around which the fish can turn rapidly and steer itself. The paired pectoral and pelvic fins control pitching, while the unpaired dorsal and anal fins reduce yawing and rolling. The caudal fin provides raw power for propelling the fish forward.

=== Body/caudal fin propulsion ===
There are five groups that differ in the fraction of their body that is displaced laterally:

==== Anguilliform ====
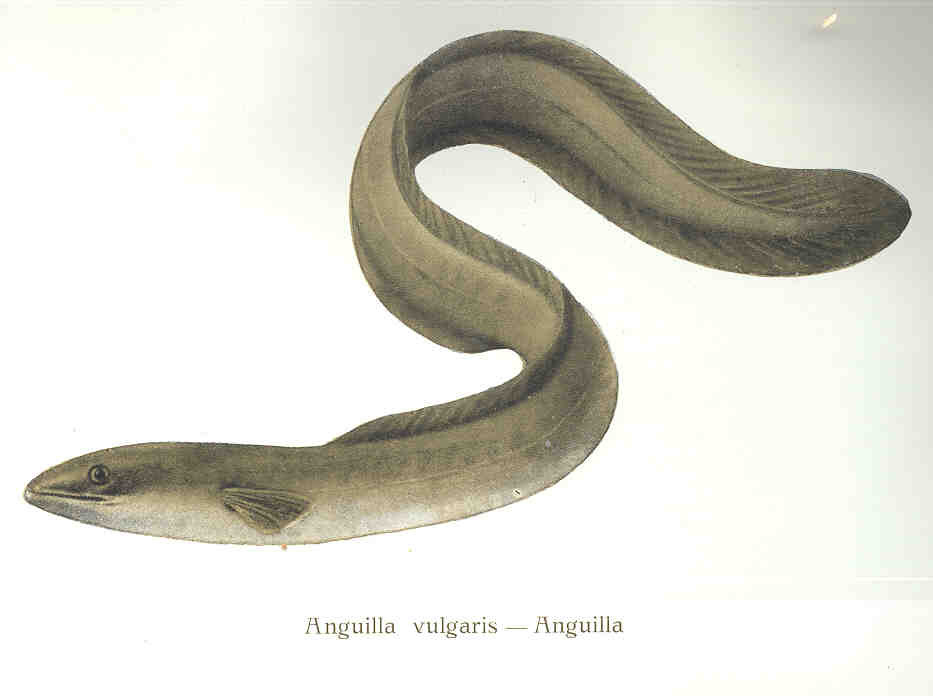
Eels propagate a more or less constant-sized flexion wave along their slender bodies.

In the anguilliform group, containing some long, slender fish such as eels, there is little increase in the amplitude of the flexion wave as it passes along the body.

==== Subcarangiform ====
The subcarangiform group has a more marked increase in wave amplitude along the body with the vast majority of the work being done by the rear half of the fish. In general, the fish body is stiffer, making for higher speed but reduced maneuverability. Trout use sub-carangiform locomotion.

==== Carangiform ====
The carangiform group, named for the Carangidae, are stiffer and faster-moving than the previous groups. The vast majority of movement is concentrated in the very rear of the body and tail. Carangiform swimmers generally have rapidly oscillating tails.

==== Thunniform ====
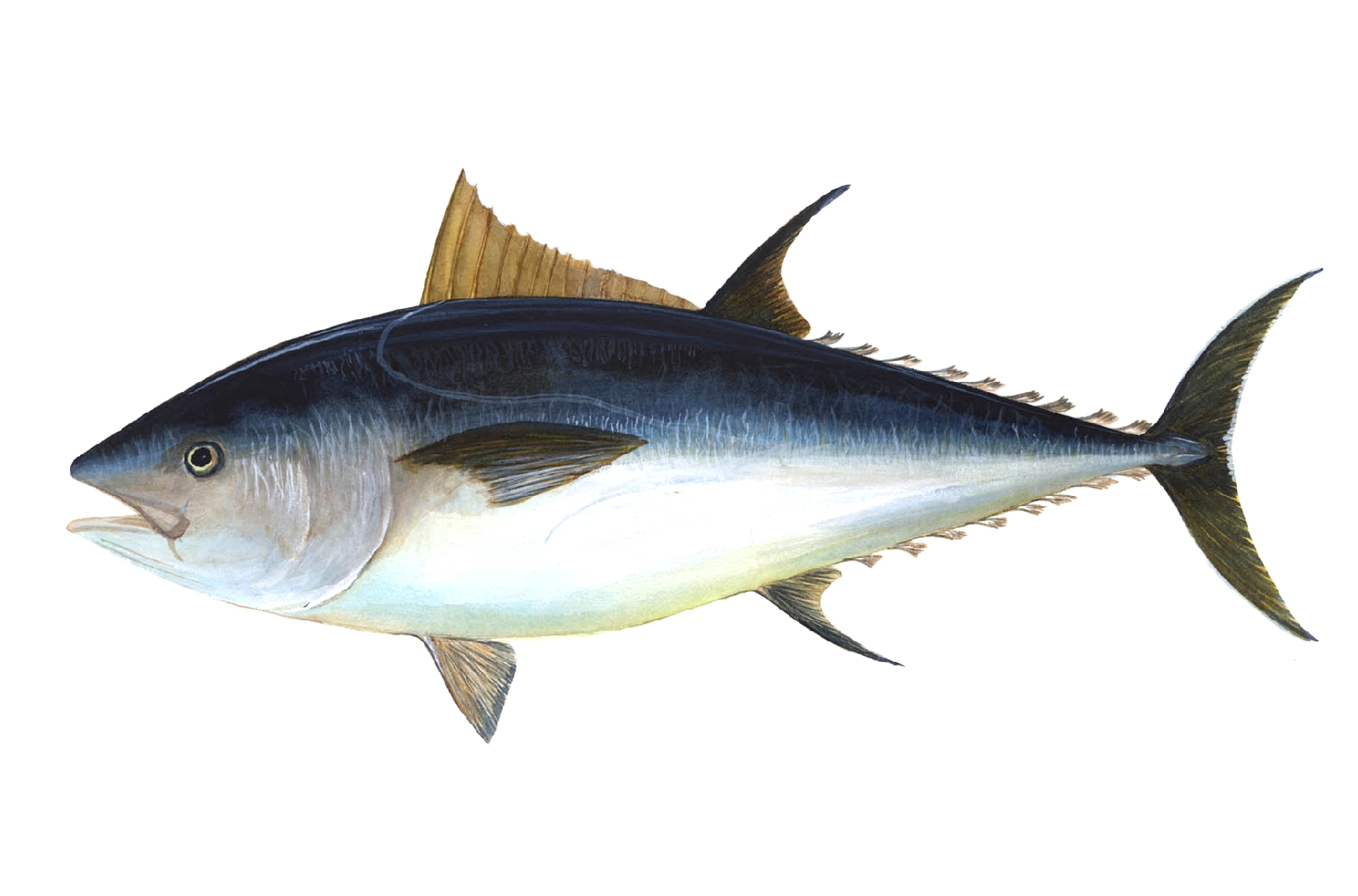
Tunas such as the bluefin swim fast with their large crescent-shaped tails.

The thunniform group contains high-speed long-distance swimmers, and is characteristic of tunas and is also found in several lamnid sharks. Here, virtually all the sideways movement is in the tail and the region connecting the main body to the tail (the peduncle). The tail itself tends to be large and crescent shaped.

==== Ostraciiform ====
The ostraciiform group have no appreciable body wave when they employ caudal locomotion. Only the tail fin itself oscillates (often very rapidly) to create thrust. This group includes Ostraciidae.

=== Median/paired fin propulsion ===
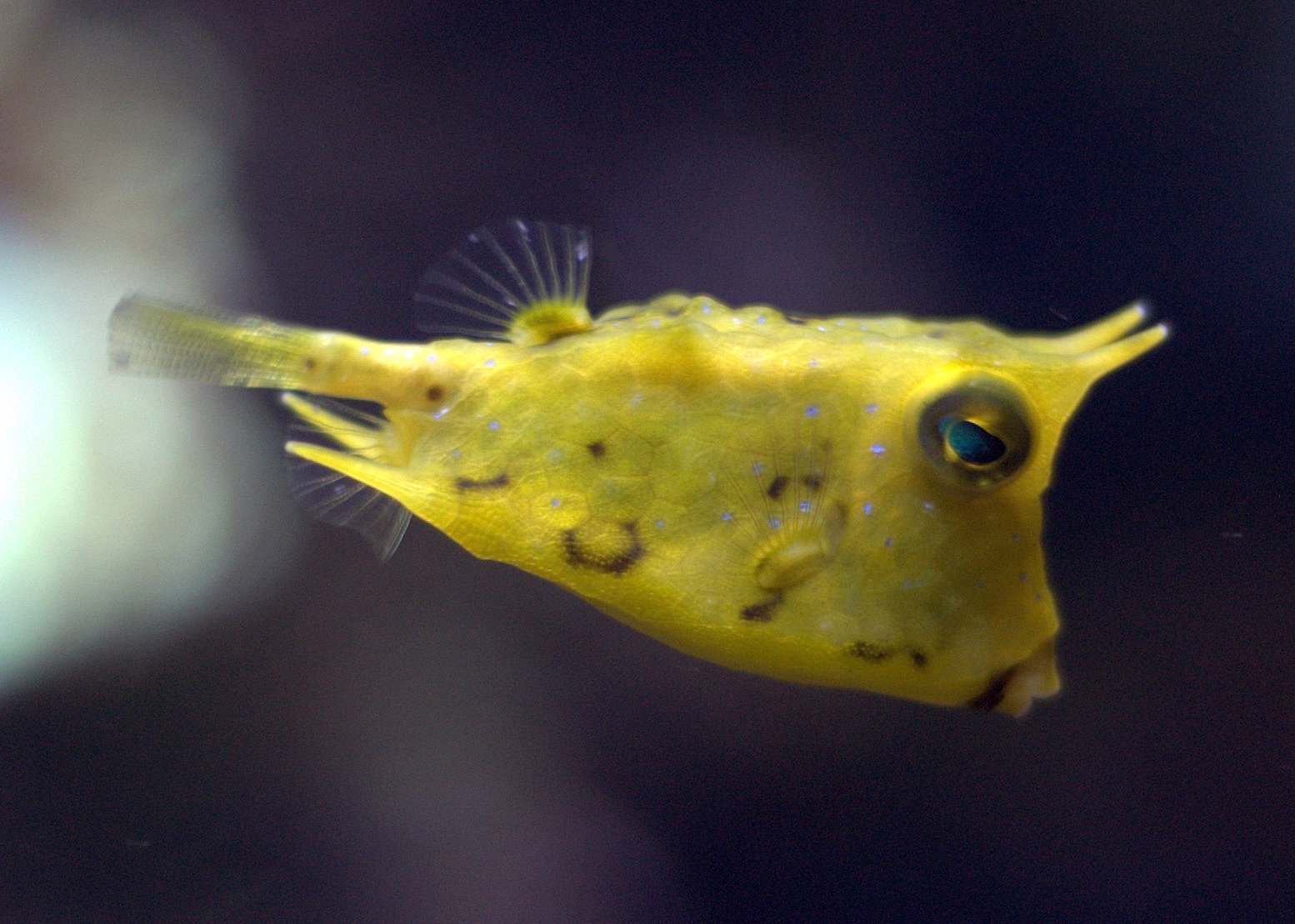
Boxfish use median-paired fin swimming, as they are not well streamlined, and use primarily their pectoral fins to produce thrust.

Not all fish fit comfortably in the above groups. Ocean sunfish, for example, have a completely different system, the tetraodontiform mode, and many small fish use their pectoral fins for swimming as well as for steering and dynamic lift. Fish in the order Gymnotiformes possess electric organs along the length of their bodies and swim by undulating an elongated anal fin while keeping the body still, presumably so as not to disturb the electric field that they generate.

Many fish swim using combined behavior of their two pectoral fins or both their anal and dorsal fins. Different types of Median paired fin propulsion can be achieved by preferentially using one fin pair over the other, and include rajiform, diodontiform, amiiform, gymnotiform and balistiform modes.

==== Rajiform ====
Rajiform locomotion is characteristic of rays and skates, when thrust is produced by vertical undulations along large, well developed pectoral fins.

==== Diodontiform ====
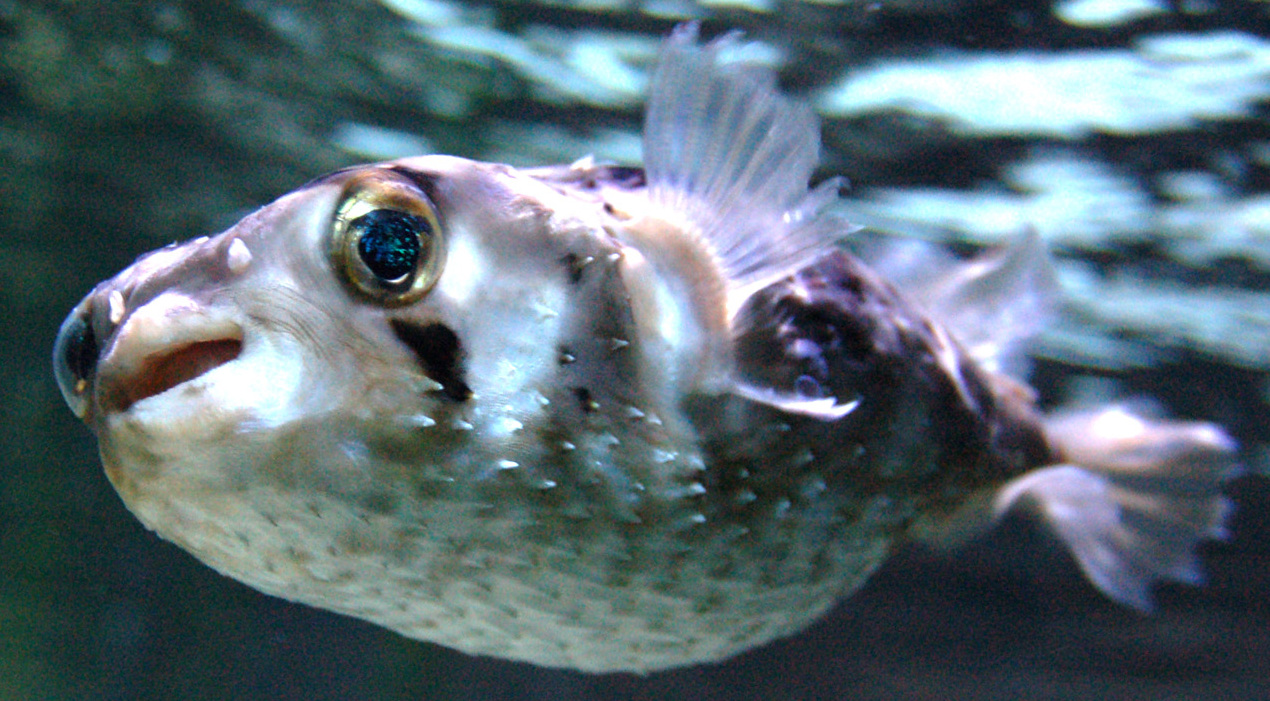
Porcupine fish (here, Diodon holocanthus) swim by undulating their pectoral fins.

Diodontiform locomotion propels the fish propagating undulations along large pectoral fins, as seen in the porcupinefish (Diodontidae).

==== Amiiform ====
Amiiform locomotion consists of undulations of a long dorsal fin while the body axis is held straight and stable, as seen in the bowfin.

==== Gymnotiform ====
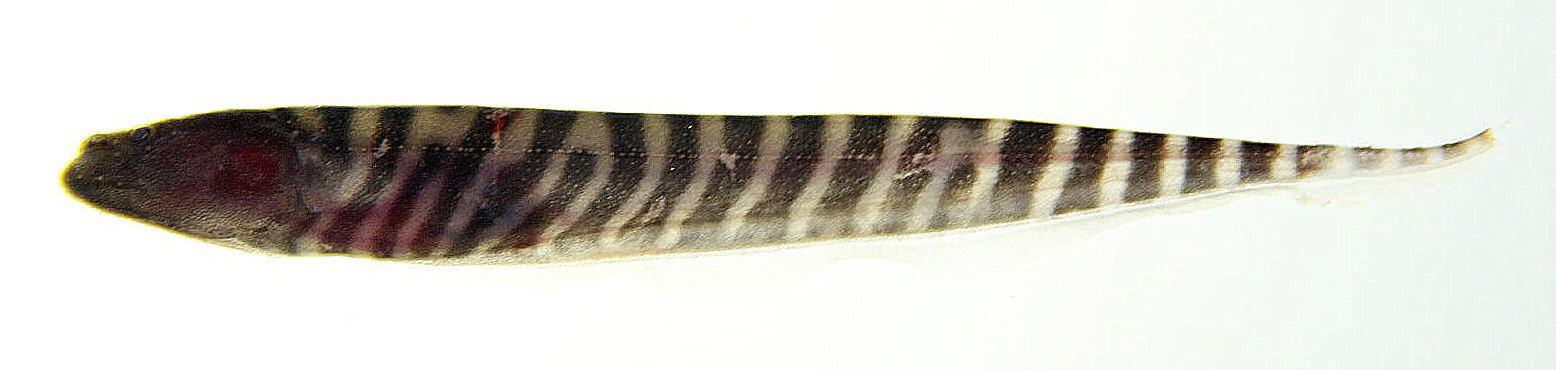
Gymnotus maintains a straight back while swimming to avoid disturbing its electric sense.

Gymnotiform locomotion consists of undulations of a long anal fin, essentially upside down amiiform, seen in the South American knifefish Gymnotiformes.

==== Balistiform ====
In balistiform locomotion, both anal and dorsal fins undulate. It is characteristic of the family Balistidae (triggerfishes). It may also be seen in the Zeidae.

==== Oscillatory ====
Oscillation is viewed as pectoral-fin-based swimming and is best known as mobuliform locomotion. The motion can be described as the production of less than half a wave on the fin, similar to a bird's wing flapping. Pelagic stingrays, such as the manta, cownose, eagle and bat rays use oscillatory locomotion.

===== Tetraodontiform =====
In tetraodontiform locomotion, the dorsal and anal fins are flapped as a unit, either in phase or exactly opposing one another, as seen in the Tetraodontiformes (boxfishes and pufferfishes). The ocean sunfish displays an extreme example of this mode.

===== Labriform =====
In labriform locomotion, seen in the wrasses (Labriformes), oscillatory movements of pectoral fins are either drag based or lift based. Propulsion is generated either as a reaction to drag produced by dragging the fins through the water in a rowing motion, or via lift mechanisms.

=== Dynamic lift ===
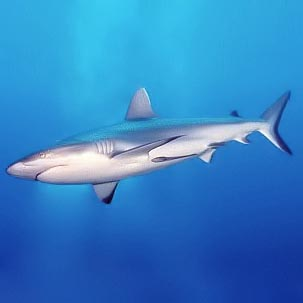
Sharks are denser than water and must swim continually to maintain depth, using dynamic lift from their pectoral fins.

Bone and muscle tissues of fish are denser than water. To maintain depth, bony fish increase buoyancy by means of a gas bladder. Alternatively, some fish store oils or lipids for this same purpose. Fish without these features use dynamic lift instead. It is done using their pectoral fins in a manner similar to the use of wings by airplanes and birds. As these fish swim, their pectoral fins are positioned to create lift which allows the fish to maintain a certain depth. The two major drawbacks of this method are that these fish must stay moving to stay afloat and that they are incapable of swimming backwards or hovering.

=== Hydrodynamics ===
Similarly to the aerodynamics of flight, powered swimming requires animals to overcome drag by producing thrust. Unlike flying, however, swimming animals often do not need to supply much vertical force because the effect of buoyancy can counter the downward pull of gravity, allowing these animals to float without much effort. While there is great diversity in fish locomotion, swimming behavior can be classified into two distinct "modes" based on the body structures involved in thrust production, Median-Paired Fin (MPF) and Body-Caudal Fin (BCF). Within each of these classifications, there are numerous specifications along a spectrum of behaviours from purely undulatory to entirely oscillatory. In undulatory swimming modes, thrust is produced by wave-like movements of the propulsive structure (usually a fin or the whole body). Oscillatory modes, on the other hand, are characterized by thrust produced by swiveling of the propulsive structure on an attachment point without any wave-like motion.

==== Body-caudal fin ====
Sardines use body-caudal fin propulsion to swim, holding their pectoral, dorsal, and anal fins flat against the body, creating a more streamlined body to reduce drag.

Most fish swim by generating undulatory waves that propagate down the body through the caudal fin. This form of undulatory locomotion is termed body-caudal fin (BCF) swimming on the basis of the body structures used; it includes anguilliform, sub-carangiform, carangiform, and thunniform locomotory modes, as well as the oscillatory ostraciiform mode.

=== Adaptation ===
Similar to adaptation in avian flight, swimming behaviors in fish can be thought of as a balance of stability and maneuverability. Because body-caudal fin swimming relies on more caudal body structures that can direct powerful thrust only rearwards, this form of locomotion is particularly effective for accelerating quickly and cruising continuously. body-caudal fin swimming is, therefore, inherently stable and is often seen in fish with large migration patterns that must maximize efficiency over long periods. Propulsive forces in median-paired fin swimming, on the other hand, are generated by multiple fins located on either side of the body that can be coordinated to execute elaborate turns. As a result, median-paired fin swimming is well adapted for high maneuverability and is often seen in smaller fish that require elaborate escape patterns.

The habitats occupied by fishes are often related to their swimming capabilities. On coral reefs, the faster-swimming fish species typically live in wave-swept habitats subject to fast water flow speeds, while the slower fishes live in sheltered habitats with low levels of water movement.

Fish do not rely exclusively on one locomotor mode, but are rather locomotor generalists, choosing among and combining behaviors from many available behavioral techniques. Predominantly body-caudal fin swimmers often incorporate movement of their pectoral, anal, and dorsal fins as an additional stabilizing mechanism at slower speeds, but hold them close to their body at high speeds to improve streamlining and reducing drag. Zebrafish have even been observed to alter their locomotor behavior in response to changing hydrodynamic influences throughout growth and maturation.

== Flight ==
The transition of predominantly swimming locomotion directly to flight has evolved in a single family of marine fish, the Exocoetidae. Flying fish are not true fliers in the sense that they do not execute powered flight. Instead, these species glide directly over the surface of the ocean water without ever flapping their "wings." Flying fish have evolved abnormally large pectoral fins that act as airfoils and provide lift when the fish launches itself out of the water. Additional forward thrust and steering forces are created by dipping the hypocaudal (i.e. bottom) lobe of their caudal fin into the water and vibrating it very quickly, in contrast to diving birds in which these forces are produced by the same locomotor module used for propulsion. Of the 64 extant species of flying fish, only two distinct body plans exist, each of which optimizes two different behaviors.

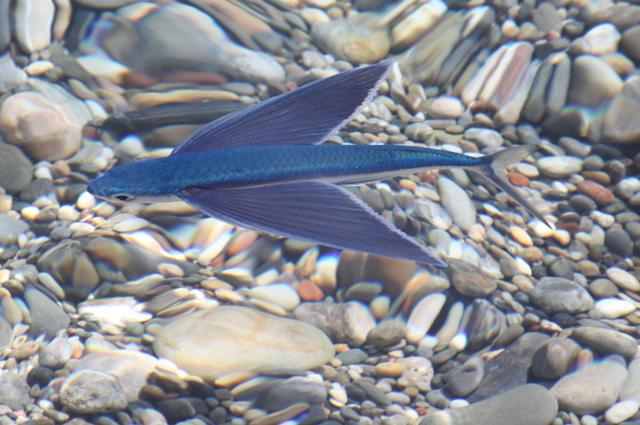
Flying fish gain sufficient lift to glide above the water thanks to their enlarged pectoral fins.

=== Tradeoffs ===
While most fish have caudal fins with evenly sized lobes (i.e. homocaudal), flying fish have an enlarged ventral lobe (i.e. hypocaudal) which facilitates dipping only a portion of the tail back onto the water for additional thrust production and steering.

Because flying fish are primarily aquatic animals, their body density must be close to that of water for buoyancy stability. This primary requirement for swimming, however, means that flying fish are heavier (have a larger mass) than other habitual fliers, resulting in higher wing loading and lift to drag ratios for flying fish compared to a comparably sized bird. Differences in wing area, wing span, wing loading, and aspect ratio have been used to classify flying fish into two distinct classifications based on these different aerodynamic designs.

=== Biplane body plan ===
In the biplane or Cypselurus body plan, both the pectoral and pelvic fins are enlarged to provide lift during flight. These fish also tend to have "flatter" bodies which increase the total lift-producing area, thus allowing them to "hang" in the air better than more streamlined shapes. As a result of this high lift production, these fish are excellent gliders and are well adapted for maximizing flight distance and duration.

Comparatively, Cypselurus flying fish have lower wing loading and smaller aspect ratios (i.e. broader wings) than their Exocoetus monoplane counterparts, which contributes to their ability to fly for longer distances than fish with this alternative body plan. Flying fish with the biplane design take advantage of their high lift production abilities when launching from the water by utilizing a "taxiing glide" in which the hypocaudal lobe remains in the water to generate thrust even after the trunk clears the water's surface and the wings are opened with a small angle of attack for lift generation.

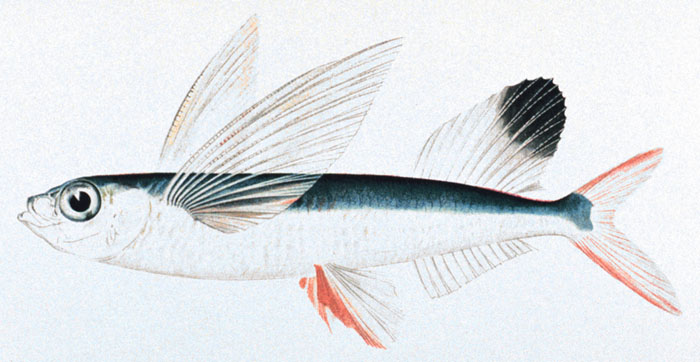
In the monoplane body plan of Exocoetus, only the pectoral fins are abnormally large, while the pelvic fins are small.

=== Monoplane body plan ===
In the Exocoetus or monoplane body plan, only the pectoral fins are enlarged to provide lift. Fish with this body plan tend to have a more streamlined body, higher aspect ratios (long, narrow wings), and higher wing loading than fish with the biplane body plan, making these fish well adapted for higher flying speeds. Flying fish with a monoplane body plan demonstrate different launching behaviors from their biplane counterparts. Instead of extending their duration of thrust production, monoplane fish launch from the water at high speeds at a large angle of attack (sometimes up to 45 degrees). In this way, monoplane fish are taking advantage of their adaptation for high flight speed, while fish with biplane designs exploit their lift production abilities during takeoff.

== Walking ==
Alticus arnoldorum hopping

Alticus arnoldorum climbing up a vertical piece of Plexiglas

A "walking fish" is a fish that is able to travel over land for extended periods of time. Some other cases of nonstandard fish locomotion include fish "walking" along the sea floor, such as the handfish or frogfish.

Most commonly, walking fish are amphibious fish. Able to spend longer times out of water, these fish may use a number of means of locomotion, including springing, snake-like lateral undulation, and tripod-like walking. The mudskippers are probably the best land-adapted of contemporary fish and are able to spend days moving about out of water and can even climb mangroves, although to only modest heights. The Climbing gourami is often specifically referred to as a "walking fish", although it does not actually "walk", but rather moves in a jerky way by supporting itself on the extended edges of its gill plates and pushing itself by its fins and tail. Some reports indicate that it can also climb trees.

There are a number of fish that are less adept at actual walking, such as the walking catfish. Despite being known for "walking on land", this fish usually wriggles and may use its pectoral fins to aid in its movement. Walking Catfish have a respiratory system that allows them to live out of water for several days. Some are invasive species. A notorious case in the United States is the Northern snakehead. Polypterids have rudimentary lungs and can also move about on land, though rather clumsily. The Mangrove rivulus can survive for months out of water and can move to places like hollow logs.

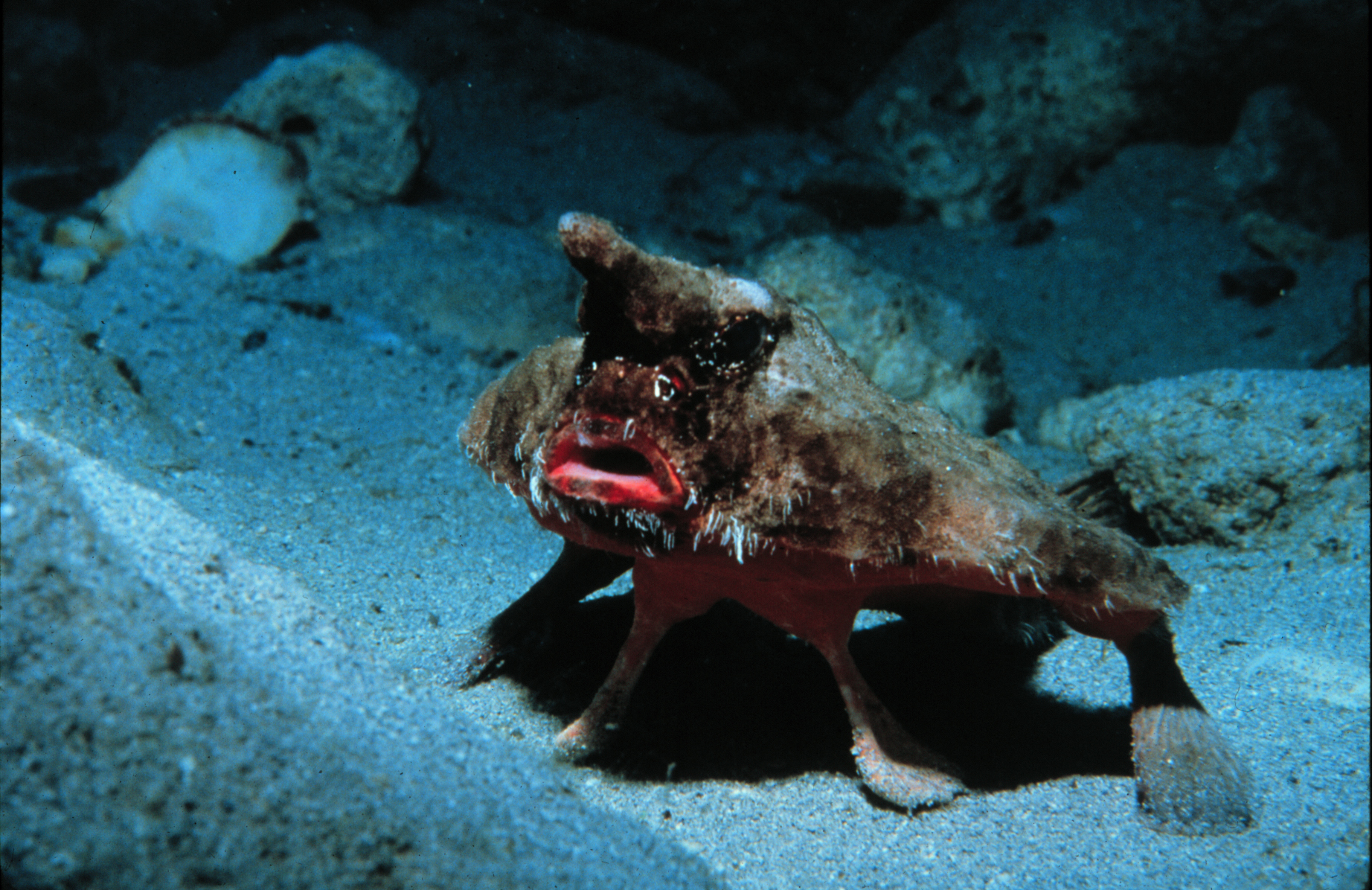
Ogcocephalus parvus

There are some species of fish that can "walk" along the sea floor but not on land; one such animal is the flying gurnard (it does not actually fly, and should not be confused with flying fish). The batfishes of the family Ogcocephalidae (not to be confused with batfish of Ephippidae) are also capable of walking along the sea floor. Bathypterois grallator, also known as a "tripodfish", stands on its three fins on the bottom of the ocean and hunts for food. The African lungfish (P. annectens) can use its fins to "walk" along the bottom of its tank in a manner similar to the way amphibians and land vertebrates use their limbs on land.

== Burrowing ==
Many fishes, particularly eel-shaped fishes such as true eels, moray eels, and spiny eels, are capable of burrowing through sand or mud. Ophichthids, the snake eels, are capable of burrowing either forwards or backwards.

== In larvae ==
=== Swimming ===
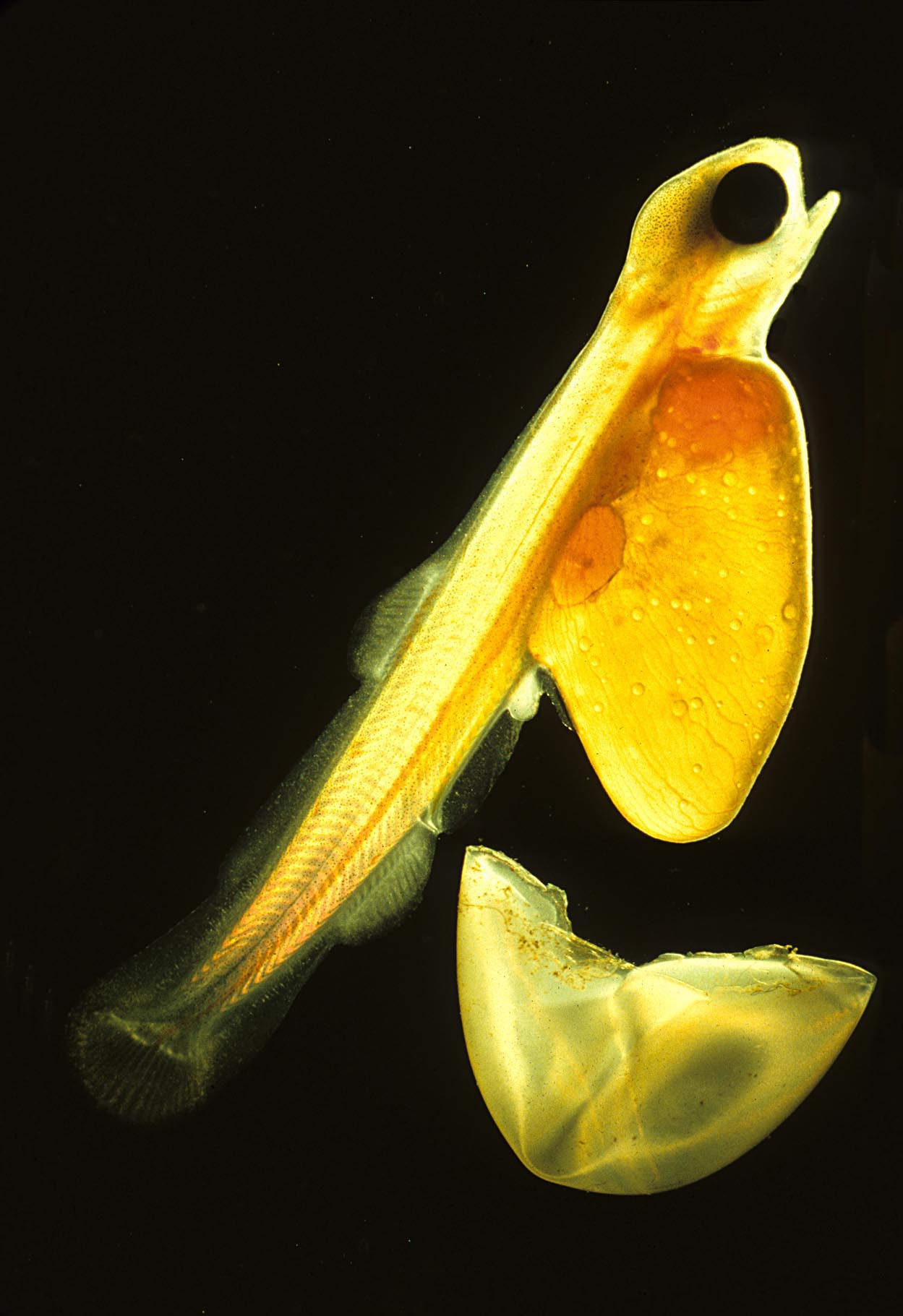
Salmon larva emerging from its egg

Fish larvae, like many adult fishes, swim by undulating their body. The swimming speed varies proportionally with the size of the animals, in that smaller animals tend to swim at lower speeds than larger animals. The swimming mechanism is controlled by the flow regime of the larvae. Reynolds number (Re) is defined as the ratio of inertial force to viscous force. Smaller organisms are affected more by viscous forces, like friction, and swim at a smaller Reynolds number. Larger organisms use a larger proportion of inertial forces, like pressure, to swim, at a higher Reynolds number.

The larvae of ray finned fishes, the Actinopterygii, swim at a quite large range of Reynolds number (Re ≈10 to 900). This puts them in an intermediate flow regime where both inertial and viscous forces play an important role. As the size of the larvae increases, the use of pressure forces to swim at higher Reynolds number increases.

Undulatory swimmers generally shed at least two types of wake: Carangiform swimmers shed connected vortex loops and Anguilliform swimmers shed individual vortex rings. These vortex rings depend upon the shape and arrangement of the trailing edge from which the vortices are shed. These patterns depend upon the swimming speed, ratio of swimming speed to body wave speed and the shape of body wave.

A spontaneous bout of swimming has three phases. The first phase is the start or acceleration phase: In this phase the larva tends to rotate its body to make a 'C' shape which is termed the preparatory stroke. It then pushes in the opposite direction to straighten its body, which is called a propulsive stroke, or a power stroke, which powers the larva to move forward. The second phase is cyclic swimming. In this phase, the larva swims with an approximately constant speed. The last phase is deceleration. In this phase, the swimming speed of the larva gradually slows down to a complete stop. In the preparatory stroke, due to the bending of the body, the larva creates 4 vortices around its body, and 2 of those are shed in the propulsive stroke. Similar phenomena can be seen in the deceleration phase. However, in the vortices of the deceleration phase, a large area of elevated vorticity can be seen compared to the starting phase.

The swimming abilities of larval fishes are important for survival. This is particularly true for the larval fishes with higher metabolic rate and smaller size which makes them more susceptible to predators. The swimming ability of a reef fish larva helps it to settle at a suitable reef and for locating its home as it is often isolated from its home reef in search of food. Hence the swimming speed of reef fish larvae are quite high (≈12 cm/s - 100 cm/s) compared to other larvae. The swimming speeds of larvae from the same families at the two locations are relatively similar. However, the variation among individuals is quite large. At the species level, length is significantly related to swimming ability. However, at the family level, only 16% of variation in swimming ability can be explained by length. There is also a negative correlation between the fineness ratio (length of body to maximum width) and the swimming ability of reef fish larvae. This suggests a minimization of overall drag and maximization of volume. Reef fish larvae differ significantly in their critical swimming speed abilities among taxa which leads to high variability in sustainable swimming speed. This again leads to sustainable variability in their ability to alter dispersal patterns, overall dispersal distances and control their temporal and spatial patterns of settlement.

=== Hydrodynamics ===
Small undulatory swimmers such as fish larvae experience both inertial and viscous forces, the relative importance of which is indicated by Reynolds number (Re). Reynolds number is proportional to body size and swimming speed. The swimming performance of a larva increases between 2–5 days post fertilization. Compared with adults, larval fish experience relatively high viscous force. To enhance thrust to an equal level with the adults, it increases its tail beat frequency and thus amplitude. In zebrafish, tail beat frequency increases over larval age to 95 Hz in 3 days post fertilization from 80 Hz in 2 days post fertilization. This higher frequency leads to higher swimming speed, thus reducing predation and increasing prey catching ability when they start feeding at around 5 days post fertilization. The vortex shedding mechanics changes with the flow regime in an inverse non-linear way. Strouhal number is a design parameter for the vortex shedding mechanism. It can be defined as a ratio of the product of tail beat frequency with amplitude with the mean swimming speed. Reynolds number (Re) is the main deciding criteria of a flow regime. It has been observed over different type of larval experiments that, slow larvae swims at higher Strouhal number but lower Reynolds number. However, the faster larvae swims distinctively at opposite conditions, that is, at lower Strouhal number but higher Reynolds number. Strouhal number is constant over similar speed ranged adult fishes. Strouhal number does not only depend on the small size of the swimmers, but also dependent to the flow regime. As in fishes which swim in viscous or high-friction flow regime, would create high body drag which will lead to higher Strouhal number. Whereas, in high viscous regime, the adults swim at lower stride length which leads to lower tail beat frequency and lower amplitude. This leads to higher thrust for same displacement or higher propulsive force, which unanimously reduces the Reynolds number.

Larval fishes start feeding at 5–7 days post fertilization. And they experience extreme mortality rate (≈99%) in the few days after feeding starts. The reason for this 'Critical Period' (Hjort-1914) is mainly hydrodynamic constraints. Larval fish fail to eat even if there are enough prey encounters. One of the primary determinants of feeding success is the size of larval body. The smaller larvae function in a lower Reynolds number (Re) regime. As the age increases, the size of the larvae increases, which leads to higher swimming speed and increased Reynolds number. It has been observed through many experiments that the Reynolds number of successful strikes (Re~200) is much higher than the Reynolds number of failed strikes (Re~20). Numerical analysis of suction feeding at a low Reynolds number concluded that around 40% energy invested in mouth opening is lost to frictional forces rather than contributing to accelerating the fluid towards mouth. Ontogenetic improvement in the sensory system, coordination and experiences are non-significant relationship while determining feeding success of larvae A successful strike positively depends upon the peak flow speed or the speed of larvae at the time of strike. The peak flow speed is also dependent on the gape speed or the speed of opening the buccal cavity to capture food. As the larva ages, its body size increase and its gape speed also increase, which cumulatively increase the successful strike outcomes.

The ability of a larval prey to survive an encounter with predator totally depends on its ability to sense and evade the strike. Adult fishes exhibit rapid suction feeding strikes as compared to larval fishes. Sensitivity of larval fish to velocity and flow fields provides the larvae a critical defense against predation. Though many prey use their visual system to detect and evade predators when there is light, it is hard for the prey to detect predators at night, which leads to a delayed response to the attack. There is a mechano-sensory system in fishes to identify the different flow generated by different motion surrounding the water and between the bodies called as lateral line system. After detecting a predator, a larva evades its strike by 'fast start' or 'C' response. A swimming fish disturbs a volume of water ahead of its body with a flow velocity that increases with the proximity to the body. This particular phenomenon is sometimes called a bow wave. The timing of the 'C' start response affects escape probability inversely. Escape probability increases with the distance from the predator at the time of strike. In general, prey successfully evade a predator strike from an intermediate distance (3–6 mm) from the predator.

Larvae of different fishes

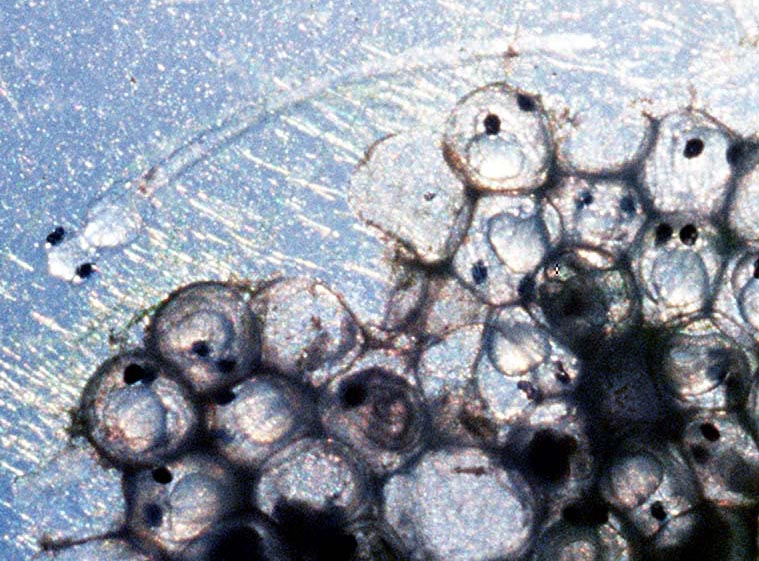
Atlantic herring eggs, with a newly hatched larva

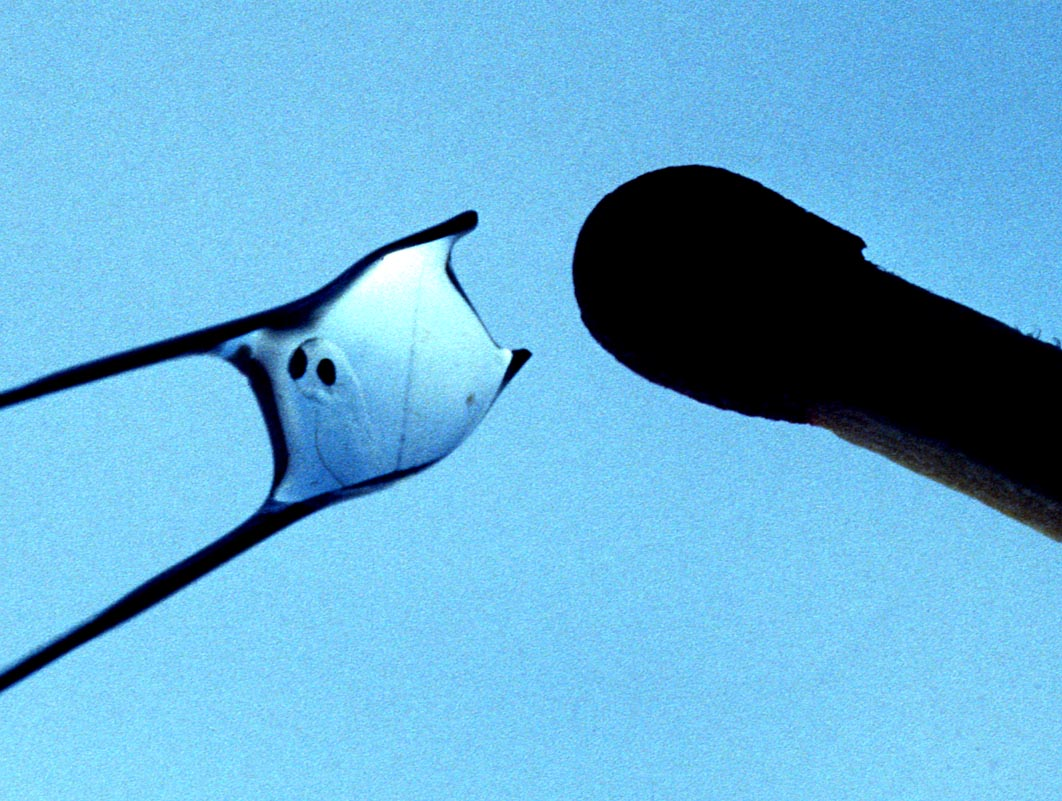
Freshly hatched herring larva in a drop of water compared to a match head.

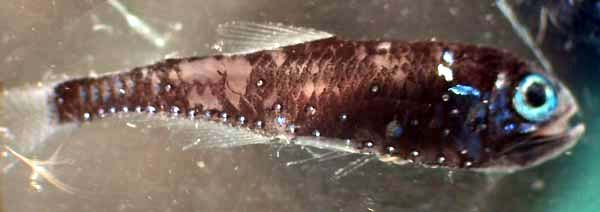
Late stage lanternfish larva

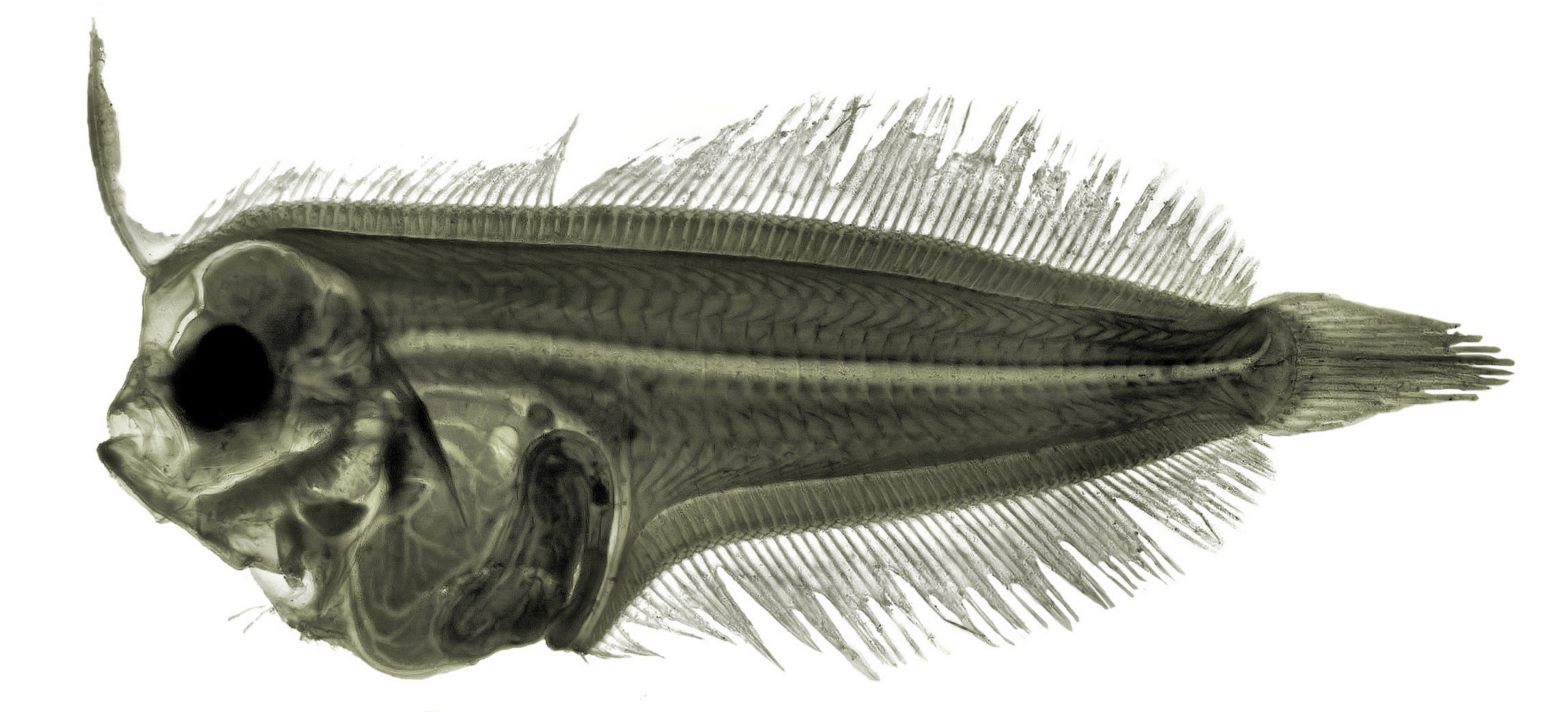
A 9mm long late stage scaldfish larva

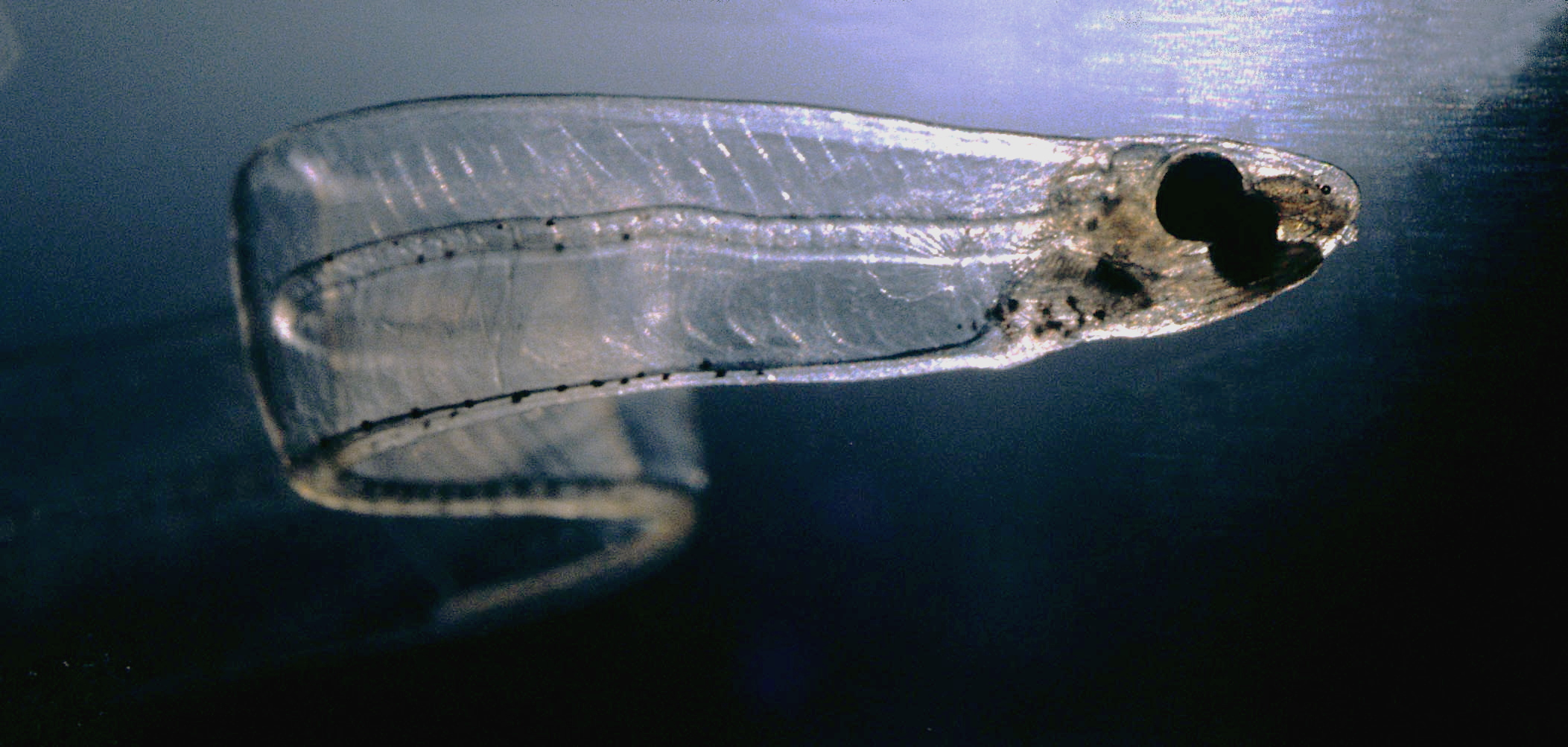
Larva of a conger eel, 7.6 cm

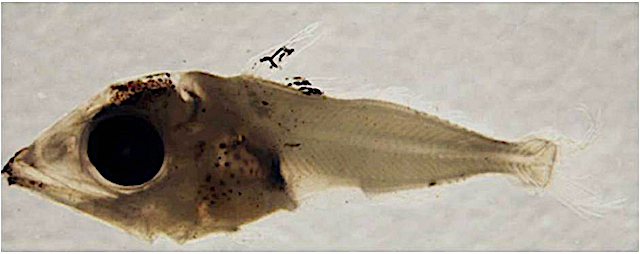
Bluefin tuna larva

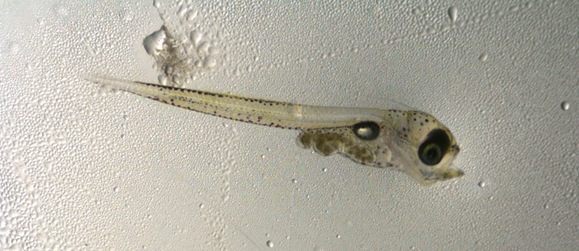
Pacific cod larva

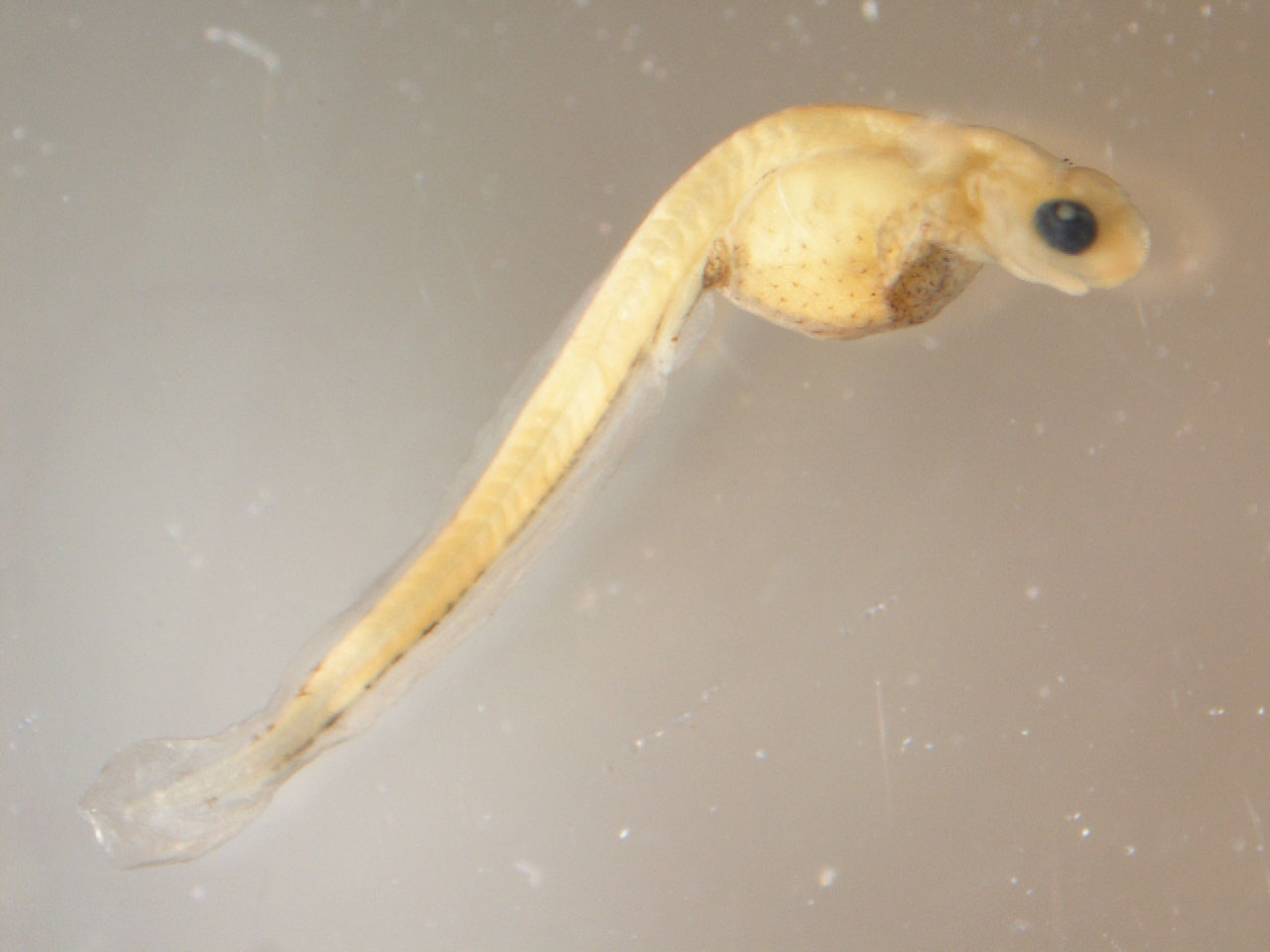
Walleye larva

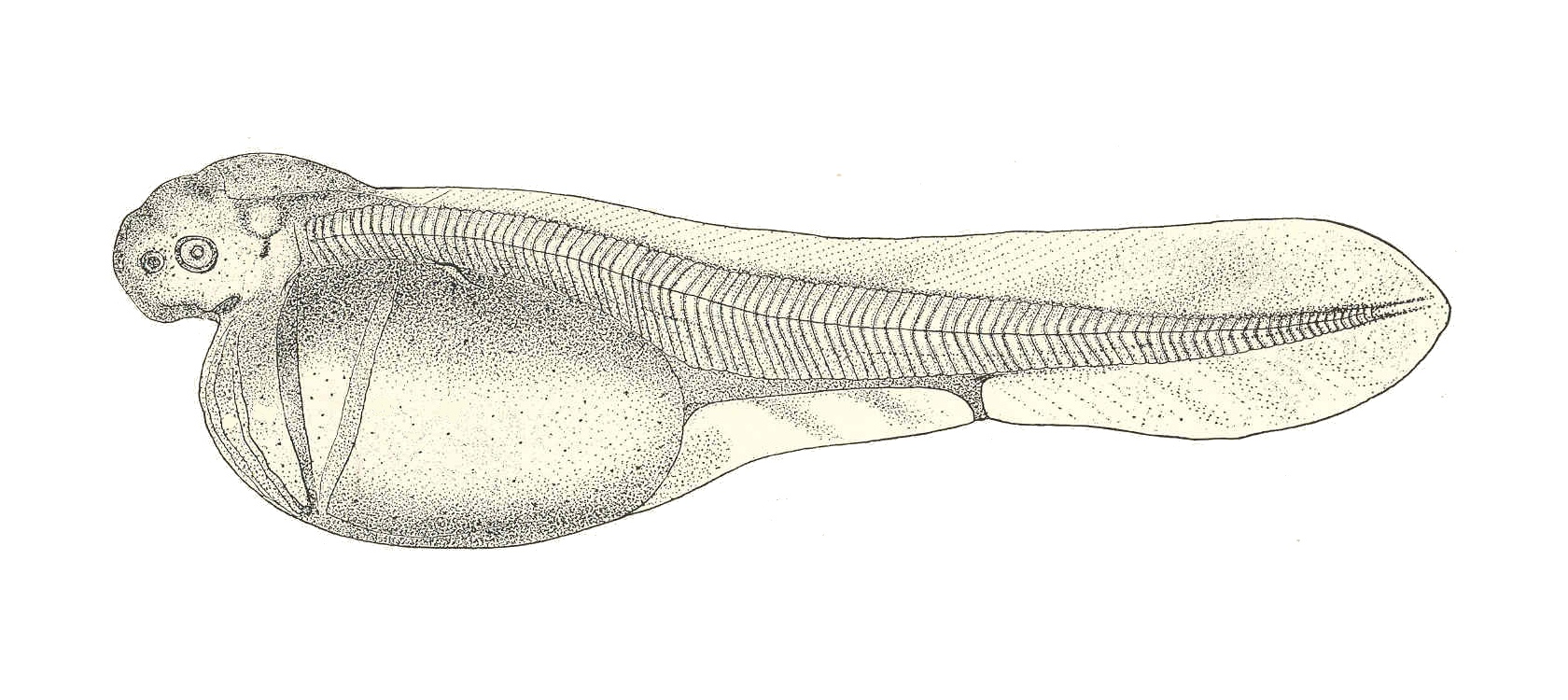
Common sturgeon larva

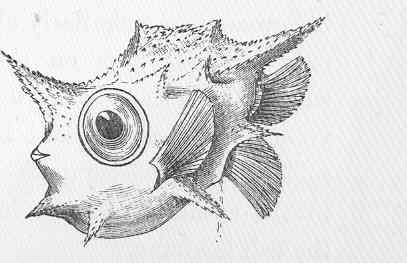
Boxfish larva

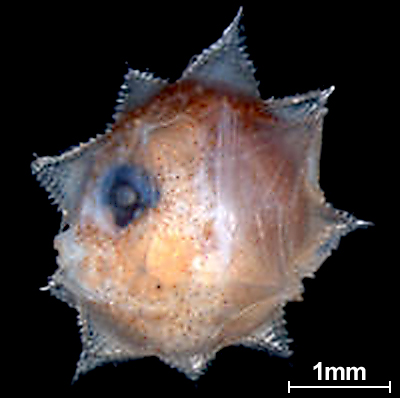
Ocean sunfish larva, 2.7mm

=== Behavior ===
Objective quantification is complicated in higher vertebrates by the complex and diverse locomotor repertoire and neural system. However, the relative simplicity of a juvenile brain and simple nervous system of fishes with fundamental neuronal pathways allows zebrafish larvae to be an apt model to study the interconnection between locomotor repertoire and neuronal system of a vertebrate. Behavior represents the unique interface between intrinsic and extrinsic forces that determine an organism's health and survival. Larval zebrafish perform many locomotor behavior such as escape response, prey tracking, optomotor response etc. These behaviors can be categorized with respect to body position as 'C'-starts, 'J'-turns, slow scoots, routine turns etc. Fish larvae respond to abrupt changes in illumination with distinct locomotor behavior. The larvae show high locomotor activity during periods of bright light compared to dark. This behavior can direct towards the idea of searching food in light whereas the larvae do not feed in dark. Also light exposure directly manipulates the locomotor activities of larvae throughout circadian period of light and dark with higher locomotor activity in light condition than in dark condition which is very similar as seen in mammals. Following the onset of darkness, larvae shows hyperactive scoot motion prior to a gradual drop off. This behavior could possibly be linked to find a shelter before nightfall. Also larvae can treat this sudden nightfall as under debris and the hyperactivity can be explained as the larvae navigation back to illuminated areas. Prolonged dark period can reduce the light-dark responsiveness of larvae. Following light extinction, larvae execute large angle turns towards the vanished light source, which explains the navigational response of a larva. Acute ethanol exposure reduce visual sensitivity of larvae causing a latency to respond in light and dark period change.

== See also ==
- Aquatic locomotion – Biologically propelled motion through a liquid medium
- Microswimmer
- Role of skin in locomotion – Use of the integumentary system in animal movement
- Tradeoffs for locomotion in air and water – Comparison of swimming and flying, evolution and biophysics
- Undulatory locomotion – Wave-like animal movement method
