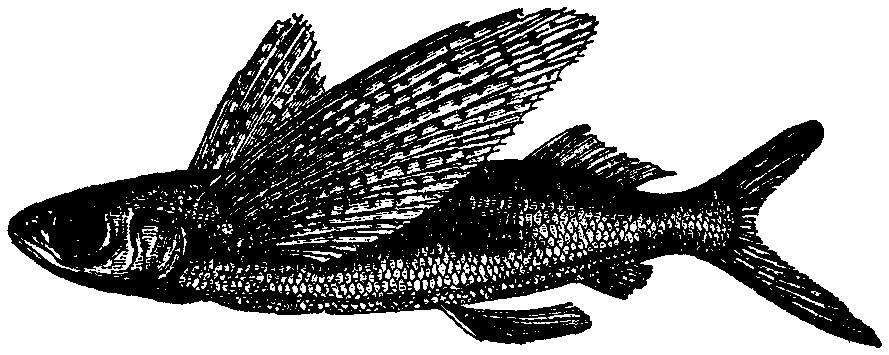
- C. callopterus

Conservation status
- Least Concern (IUCN 3.1)

Scientific classification
- Kingdom: Animalia
- Phylum: Chordata
- Class: Actinopterygii
- Order: Beloniformes
- Family: Exocoetidae
- Genus: Cypselurus
- Species: C. callopterus

Binomial name
- Cypselurus callopterus Günther, 1866

Synonyms
- Exocoetus callopterus Günther, 1866

= Ornamented flying fish =

Species of fish

The ornamented flying fish, or beautyfin flying fish (Cypselurus callopterus), is a species of flying fish of the genus Cypselurus in the family Exocoetidae. The British ichthyologist Albert Günther first described it in 1866 in his eight-volume Catalogue of Fishes (1859–1870).
