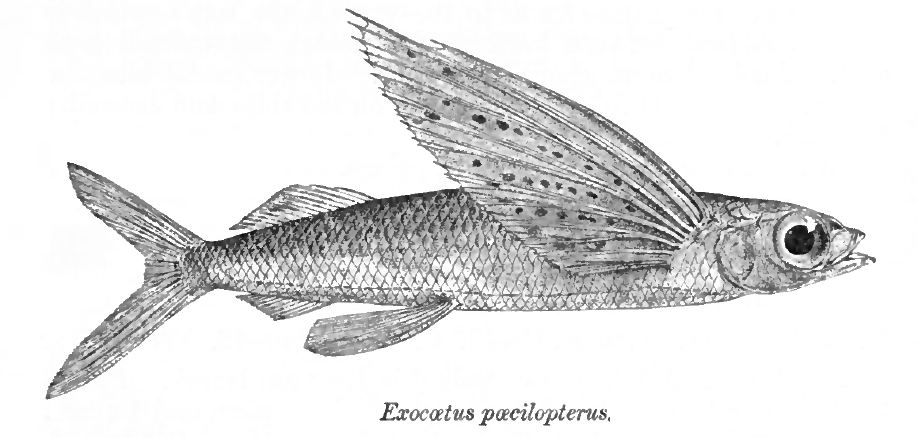
- Yellow-wing Flying Fish (C. poecilopterus)

Scientific classification
- Kingdom: Animalia
- Phylum: Chordata
- Class: Actinopterygii
- Order: Beloniformes
- Family: Exocoetidae
- Subfamily: Cypsellurinae
- Genus: Cypselurus; Swainson, 1838

Type species
- Exocoetus appendiculatus, a synonym of Cypselurus comatus Wood, 1825

Species
- Twelve recognized - see text.

= Cypselurus =

Genus of fishes

Cypselurus is a genus of flying fish in the family Exocoetidae. They are found across Indo-Pacific to western Atlantic ocean.

== Species ==
Currently, there are twelve recognized species in this genus:

- Cypselurus angusticeps (Nichols & Breder, 1935) — narrowhead flying fish
- Cypselurus callopterus (Günther, 1866) — ornamented flying fish, beautyfin flying fish
- Cypselurus comatus (Mitchill, 1815) — clearwing flying fish
- Cypselurus hexazona (Bleeker, 1853) — darkbar flying fish
- Cypselurus hiraii (T. Abe, 1953)
- Cypselurus longibarbus (Parin, 1861)
- Cypselurus naresii (Günther, 1889) — Pharao flying fish
- Cypselurus oligolepis (Bleeker, 1865) — large-scale flying fish
- Cypselurus opisthopus (Bleeker, 1865) — black-finned flying fish
- Cypselurus persimilis
- Cypselurus poecilopterus (Valenciennes, 1847) - yellow-wing flying fish
- Cypselurus simus (Valenciennes, 1847) — short-nosed flying fish
- Cypselurus starksi (T. Abe, 1953)

== See also ==
- Shakhovskoy, I.B., and N.V. Parin (2019). A review of the flying fish genus Cypselurus (Beloniformes: Exocoetidae). Part 1. Revision of the subgenus Zonocypselurus Parin and Bogorodsky, 2011 with descriptions of one new subgenus, four new species and two new subspecies and reinstatement of one species as valid. Zootaxa 4589(1): 1–71. doi:10.11646/zootaxa.4589.1.1
