= Scomberesocidae =

Scomberesocidae Temporal range: Miocene–Recent
- Scomberesox saurus

Scientific classification
- Kingdom: Animalia
- Phylum: Chordata
- Class: Actinopterygii
- Division: Teleostei
- Order: Beloniformes
- Superfamily: Scomberesocoidea
- Family: Scomberesocidae; J. P. Müller, 1843

Genera
- see text

Family of fishes

Sauries are fish of the family Scomberesocidae. There are two genera, each containing two species. The name Scomberesocidae is derived from scomber (which in turn is derived from the Greek skombros, meaning 'mackerel') and the Latin esox meaning pike.

Sauries are marine epipelagic fish which live in tropical and temperate waters. These fish often jump while swimming near the surface, skimming the water, which is similar to flying fish, a fellow member of the order Beloniformes. The jaws of sauries are beak-like, ranging from long, slender beaks to relatively short ones with the lower jaw only slightly elongated. The mouth openings of sauries, however, are small and the jaws have weak teeth. The most distinctive feature of sauries, however, is the presence of a row of small finlets behind the dorsal and anal fins. They also lack swim bladders. Sauries grow to a maximum length of about 46 centimetres (18 in), but the group also includes the smallest of all epipelagic fish, Cololabis adocetus, with an adult length of just 7.5 centimetres (3.0 in).

They are harvested commercially as a food fish; Pacific saury are consumed often in Japanese and Korean cuisine. The fish is usually grilled.

The Saury, a Sargo-class submarine, was the only ship of the United States Navy to be named for this fish.

== Genera ==
There are two recognised genera within the family Scomberesocidae:

- Cololabis Gill, 1896
- Scomberesox Lacépède, 1803

The extinct genus, Praescomberesox, is a potential member of the family, and is known by fossil scales from the Late Eocene of California.

Some researchers consider these two genera as members of Belonidae, rendering this family as its synonym; the following cladogram is based on a phylogenetic analysis of both genetics and morphology by Lovejoy (2007), with Scomberesocidae being sister to the genus Belone:

- Belonidae
  - Strongylura notata
  - - - - - - Ablennes
            - Tylosurus
          - - - Strongylura strongylura
              - Strongylura leiura
            - Xenentodon
        - Strongylura krefftii
      - Strongylura incisa
    - - - - - Strongylura timucu
            - Strongylura senegalensis
          - - - - - Strongylura marina
                  - Strongylura exilis
                - Strongylura hubbsi
              - - - Pseudotylosurus
                  - Strongylura scapularis
                - Strongylura fluviatilis
            - - Potamorrhaphis
              - Belonion
        - Platybelone
      - - Belone
        - Scomberesocidae
          - Scomberesox saurus
          - Cololabis saira

== See also ==
- Beloniformes
