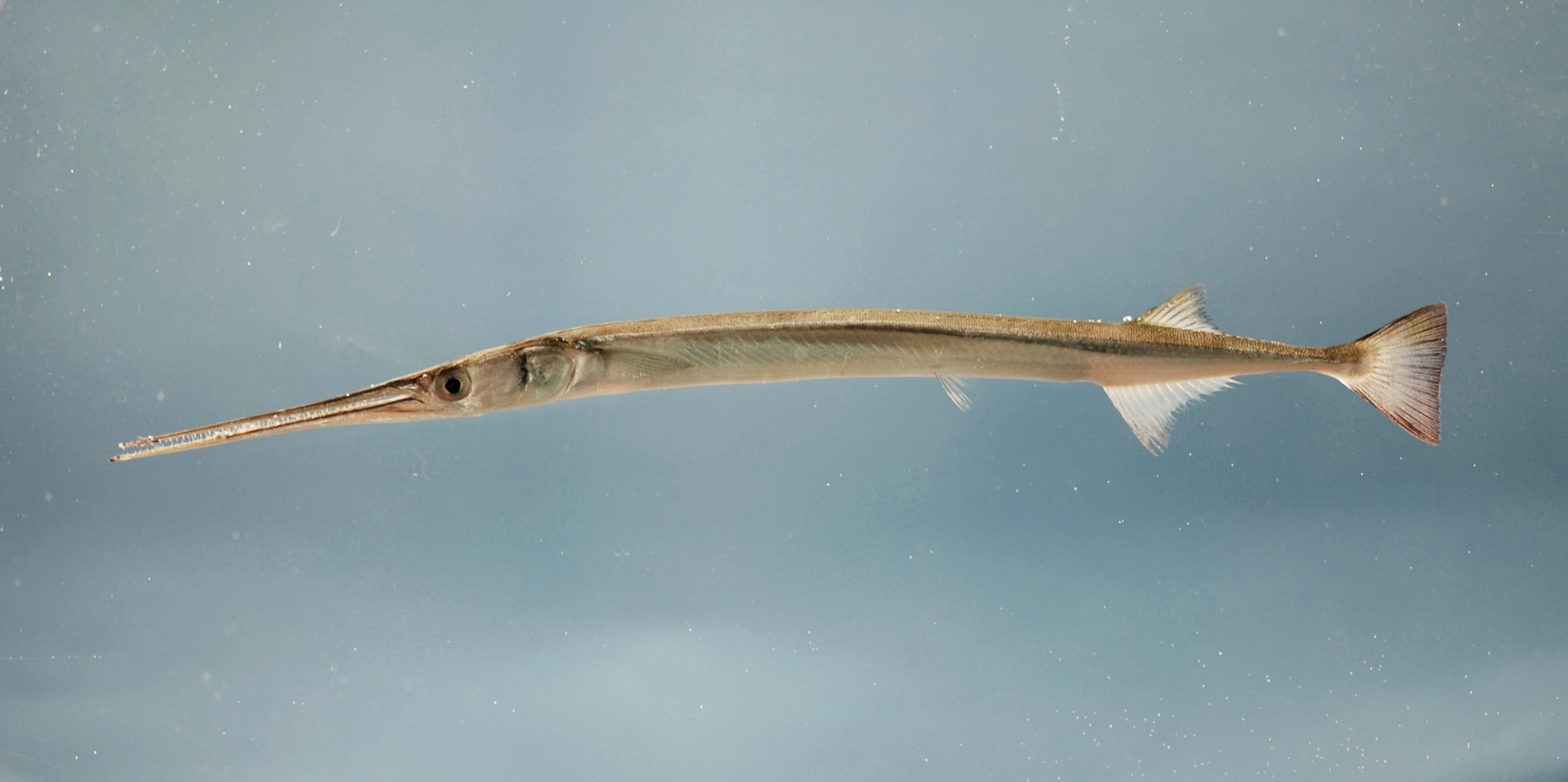
- Atlantic Needlefish (S. marina)

Scientific classification
- Kingdom: Animalia
- Phylum: Chordata
- Class: Actinopterygii
- Division: Teleostei
- Order: Beloniformes
- Family: Belonidae
- Genus: Strongylura van Hasselt, 1824

Type species
- Strongylura caudimaculata van Hasselt, 1824

= Strongylura =

Genus of fishes

Strongylura is a genus of needlefishes from the family Belonidae which is distributed throughout the tropical and warmer temperate waters of the world, including some species which live in freshwater.

== Species ==
Currently, there are 14 recognized species in this genus:

- Strongylura anastomella (Valenciennes, 1846)
- Strongylura exilis (Girard, 1854) (Californian needlefish)
- Strongylura fluviatilis (Regan, 1903)
- Strongylura hubbsi Collette, 1974 (Maya needlefish)
- Strongylura incisa (Valenciennes, 1846) (reef needlefish)
- Strongylura krefftii (Günther, 1866) (long tom)
- Strongylura leiura (Bleeker, 1850) (banded needlefish)
- Strongylura marina (Walbaum, 1792) (Atlantic needlefish)
- Strongylura notata (Poey, 1860)
  - S. n. forsythia Breder, 1932
  - S. n. notata (Poey, 1860) (redfin needlefish)
- Strongylura scapularis (D. S. Jordan & C. H. Gilbert, 1882) (shoulderspot needlefish)
- Strongylura senegalensis (Valenciennes, 1846) (Senegal needlefish)
- Strongylura strongylura (van Hasselt, 1823) (spottail needlefish)
- Strongylura timucu (Walbaum, 1792) (timucu)
- Strongylura urvillii (Valenciennes, 1846) (Urville's longtom)

Strongylura is thought to not be monophyletic; the following cladogram is based on a phylogenetic analysis of both genetics and morphology by Lovejoy (2007), with Strongylura being represented as polyphyletic with respects to other belonids:

- Belonidae
  - Strongylura notata
  - - - - - - Ablennes
            - Tylosurus
          - - - Strongylura strongylura
              - Strongylura leiura
            - Xenentodon
        - Strongylura krefftii
      - Strongylura incisa
    - - - - - Strongylura timucu
            - Strongylura senegalensis
          - - - - - Strongylura marina
                  - Strongylura exilis
                - Strongylura hubbsi
              - - - Pseudotylosurus
                  - Strongylura scapularis
                - Strongylura fluviatilis
            - - Potamorrhaphis
              - Belonion
        - Platybelone
      - - Belone
        - Scomberesocidae
