= Scomberesox simulans =

Conservation status
- Least Concern (IUCN 3.1)

Scientific classification
- Kingdom: Animalia
- Phylum: Chordata
- Class: Actinopterygii
- Order: Beloniformes
- Family: Scomberesocidae
- Genus: Scomberesox
- Species: S. simulans

Binomial name
- Scomberesox simulans (Hubbs & Wisner, 1980)

Synonyms
- Nanichthys simulans Hubbs & Wisner, 1980

Dwarf saury, a species of fish

Scomberesox simulans, the dwarf saury, is a species of ray-finned fish within the family Scomberesocidae, found in the Atlantic and Indian Ocean. It inhabits tropical and subtropical waters near the surface as a pelagic-oceanic species, migrating as the ocean warms in the spring and summer. It mainly feeds on planktonic organisms. The maximum length recorded was 13 centimetres (5.1 in) in length, although the species is most commonly found at 9–10 centimetres (3.5–3.9 in) in length. It is often confused as the juvenile form of the Atlantic saury.

== Conservation ==
Scomberesox simulans is classified as a 'least concern' species by the IUCN Red List, as its quite common within its range, has no known major threats, and is too small to be of interest to commercial fisheries. No conservation measures have been made towards the species.
