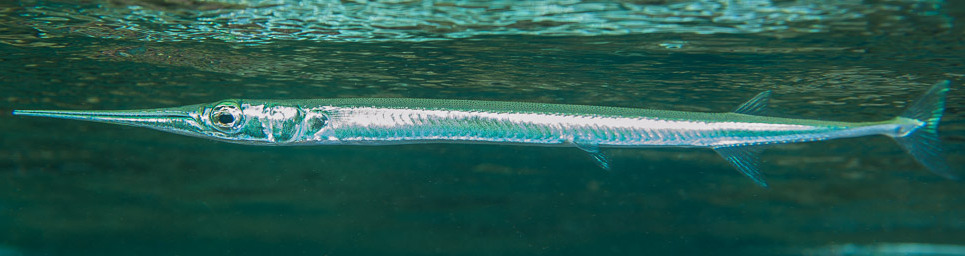
- Platybelone argalus

Conservation status
- Least Concern (IUCN 3.1)

Scientific classification
- Kingdom: Animalia
- Phylum: Chordata
- Class: Actinopterygii
- Order: Beloniformes
- Family: Belonidae
- Genus: Platybelone
- Species: P. argalus

Binomial name
- Platybelone argalus (Lesueur, 1821)

Subspecies
- See text

Synonyms
- Platybelone annobonensis Collette & Parin, 1970; Belone adreola Valenciennes, 1846; Belone carinata Valenciennes, 1846; Platybelone dorsalis Whitley, 1932; Strongylura longleyi Breder, 1932; Belone persimilis Günther, 1909; Belone platyura Bennett, 1832; Tylosurus pterurus Osburn & Nichols, 1916; Esox teatae Curtiss, 1938; Belone trachura Valenciennes, 1846; Platybelone trachura (Valenciennes 1846)

= Keeltail needlefish =

Species of fish

The keeltail needlefish (Platybelone argalus), sometimes called the keeled needlefish, is a tropical fish of the family Belonidae. It was described by the French naturalist Charles Alexandre Lesueur in 1821.

== Description ==
Keeltail needlefish, like all needlefish, closely resemble North American freshwater gars (family Lepisosteidae). It is most recognized by the large, flat keel-like structures running on either side of the tail. They have 12 to 15 rays on their dorsal fins, and 17 to 20 rays on their anal fins. Keeltail needlefish have gill-rakers, their caudal peduncles have lateral keels, with a lateral line running ventral to it, and grow up to 50 cm long The keeltail needlefish's top jaw is also smaller than the lower one.

== Distribution and habitat ==
Keeltail needlefish are found in the western Atlantic Ocean between North Carolina and Brazil, including the Gulf of Mexico, the Bahamas, and the Caribbean Sea. In the Indian Ocean, they are known off of East Africa, with their range continuing into the Pacific, reaching the Hawaiian Islands and continuing north to the Ogasawara Islands. Keeltail needle fish have also been found around the Arabian Peninsula, in the Red Sea and Persian Gulf They usually occur offshore and are abundant around islands. Some of the most recognized subspecies are P. a. platura, most common in the Red Sea and Persian Gulf;P. a. platyura, known from the rest of the Indo-Pacific; and P. a. argalus from the Atlantic.

They school in sheltered parts of reefs, feeding mainly on smaller fish. Keeltail needlefish are egg-laying, attaching their eggs to floating objects with specialized tendril-like structures on the egg's surface.

P. argalus range map, with each major subspecies highlighted

== Subspecies ==
Seven subspecies are recognized:

- Platybelone argalus annobonensis Collette & Parin, 1970 (Annobon keeltail needlefish)
- P. a. argalus (Lesueur, 1821) (keeltail needlefish)
- P. a. lovii (Günther, 1866)
- P. a. platura (Rüppell, 1837)
- P. a. platyura (E. T. Bennett, 1832) (keeled needlefish)
- P. a. pterura (R. C. Osburn & Nichols, 1916) (Baja California keeltail needlefish)
- P. a. trachura (Valenciennes, 1846)

Fishbase treats P.a. lovii as a valid species, Platybelone lovii, while other authorities also treat P.a platyura and P.a. trachura as valid species.
