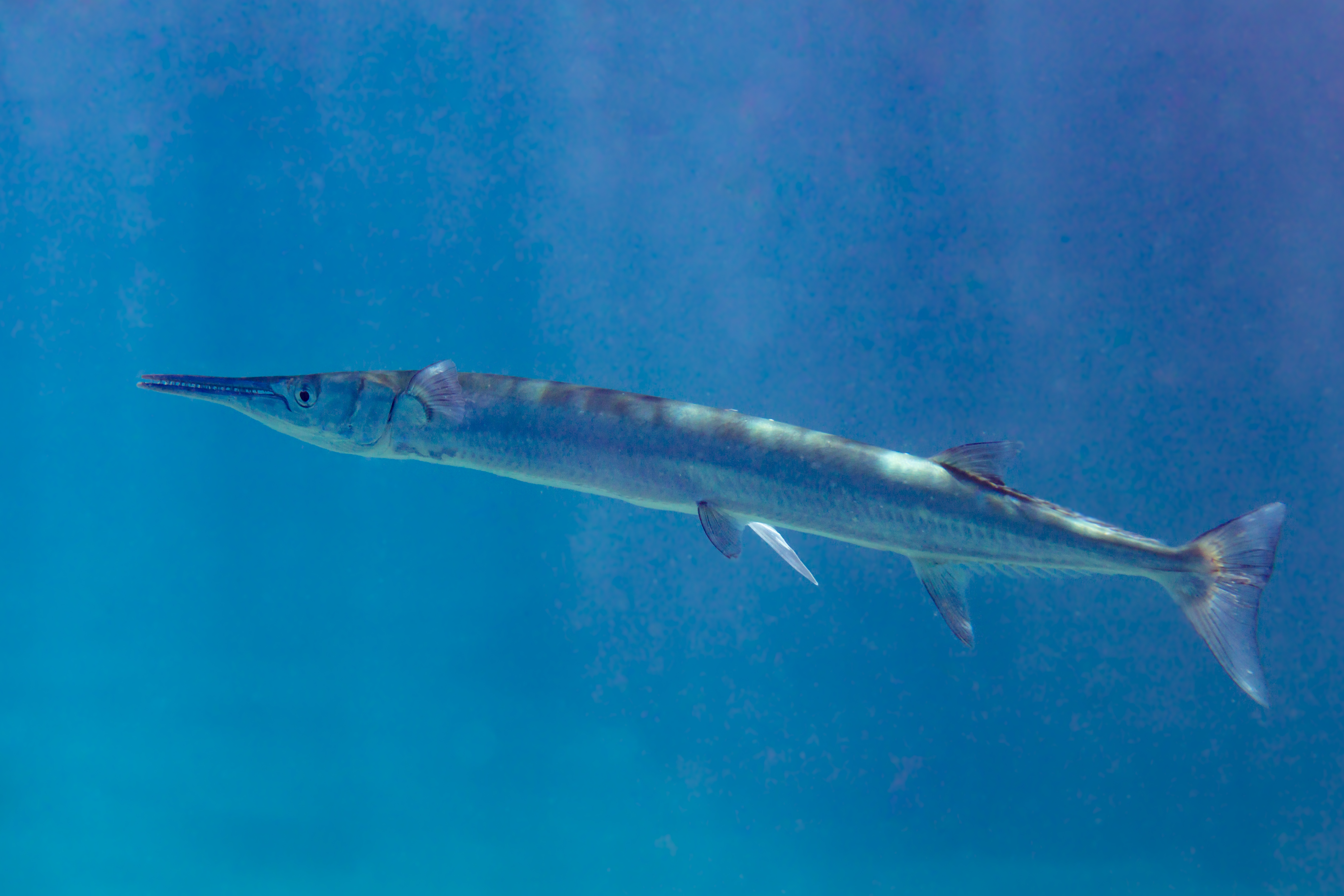

Conservation status
- Least Concern (IUCN 3.1)

Scientific classification
- Kingdom: Animalia
- Phylum: Chordata
- Class: Actinopterygii
- Order: Beloniformes
- Family: Belonidae
- Genus: Tylosurus
- Species: T. fodiator

Binomial name
- Tylosurus fodiator Jordan & Gilbert, 1882

Synonyms
- Strongylura fodiator (Jordan & Gilbert, 1882); Tylosurus crocodilus fodiator Jordan & Gilbert, 1882

= Tylosurus fodiator =

Species of fish

Tylosurus fodiator, the Mexican needlefish, is a species of needlefish from the family Belonidae which is found only in the eastern Pacific, from the Gulf of California south to Ecuador including the Galapagos, Cocos and Malpelo Islands. It was previously considered to be a subspecies of the houndfish but is now regarded as valid species. This species is normally encountered close to the coast but can be found in offshore waters. It is a predatory species, feeding mainly on small fishes. They lay eggs which adhere to objects in the water by filaments which cover the outer layer of the eggs. This species was described in 1882 by David Starr Jordan and Charles Henry Gilbert with the type locality given as Mazatlán in Sinaloa, western Mexico.
