= Belonion apodion =

Scientific classification
- Kingdom: Animalia
- Phylum: Chordata
- Class: Actinopterygii
- Order: Beloniformes
- Family: Belonidae
- Genus: Belonion
- Species: B. apodion

Binomial name
- Belonion apodion (Collette, 1966)

Species of fish

Belonion apodion is one of two freshwater needlefish in the genus Belonion, which is in the family Belonidae. It is native to South America where it is found in the basins of the Guaporè and Madeira Rivers. This species was described by Bruce Collette in 1966 with the type locality given as Laguna 3 kilometers southwest of Costa Marques on the Rio Guapore in Bolivia at border between Brazil and Bolivia. It is the type species of the genus Belonion.
