= Scomberesox scombroides =

Scientific classification
- Kingdom: Animalia
- Phylum: Chordata
- Class: Actinopterygii
- Order: Beloniformes
- Family: Scomberesocidae
- Genus: Scomberesox
- Species: S. scombroides

Binomial name
- Scomberesox scombroides (J. Richardson, 1843)

Synonyms
- Sairis scombroides Richardson, 1843; Scombresox forsteri Valenciennes, 1846; Scomberesox forsteri Valenciennes, 1846; Scomberesox stolatus de Buen, 1959

Species of fish

Scomberesox scombroides, the king gar, is a species of saury, a fish in the family Scomberesocidae which is widespread in the temperate oceans of the Southern Hemisphere. It is a slender, elongated fish which has a small mouth with long extensions of both jaws forming a beak with the extension of the lower jaw being slightly longer than that of the upper jaw, the dorsal and anal fins are set far back on the body and have short bases, each is followed by 5-7 finlets between them and the deeply forked homocercal tail.

Scomberesox scombroides is an epipelagic, schooling species which is found in the open sea near the surface, although it occasionally enters bays and inlets. Although the flesh is highly thought of for eating, the occurrence of large schools which can be exploited is too infrequent for the species to have any commercial importance. Its food consists mainly of small planktonic organisms. It is preyed on by larger fish such as yellowfin tuna, birds such as Cape gannets and by marine mammals. It spawns in warmer waters but for feeding it migrates to cool temperate, plankton-rich waters.

Scomberesox scombroides was described by the Scottish naval surgeon, naturalist and Arctic explorer Sir John Richardson as Sairis scombroides with the type locality given as Dusky Bay, New Zealand.
