= Belonion dibranchodon =

Scientific classification
- Kingdom: Animalia
- Phylum: Chordata
- Class: Actinopterygii
- Division: Teleostei
- Order: Beloniformes
- Family: Belonidae
- Genus: Belonion
- Species: B. dibranchodon

Binomial name
- Belonion dibranchodon (Collette, 1966)

Species of fish

Belonion dibranchodon is one of two needlefish, in the genus Belonion, which is in the family Belonidae in the order Beloniformes. They are native to South America within the Atabapo and Negro River basins, and can be found in freshwater environments within a benthopelagic range in a tropical climate. B. dibranchodon can reach about 4.8 cm (1.8 in) in length. This species is recorded to be oviparous; they produce their young by means of eggs. The eggs can be found on objects in the water attached by tendrils on the surface of the egg.
