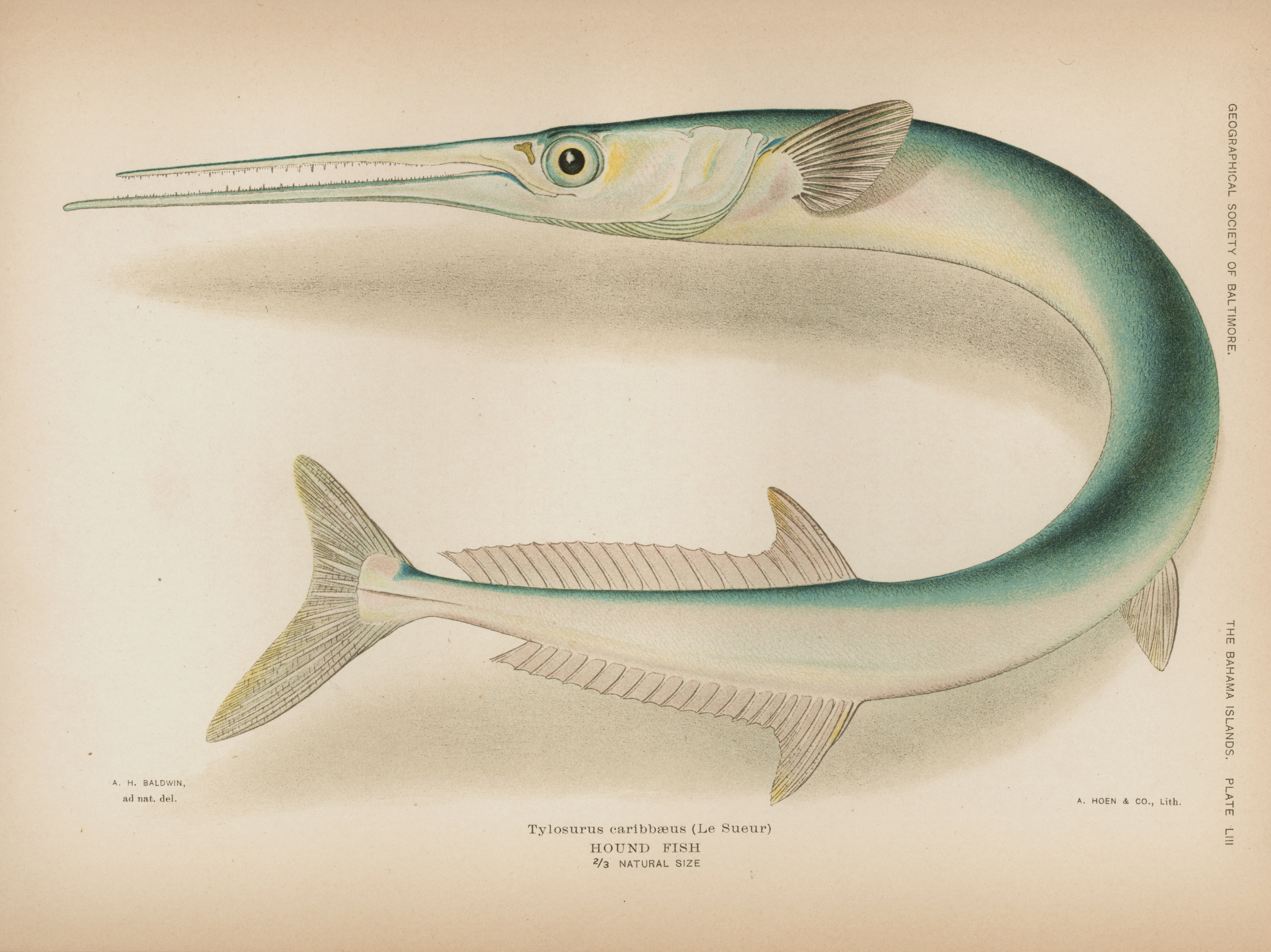
- Illustration from The Bahama Islands by The Geographical Society of Baltimore 1905.
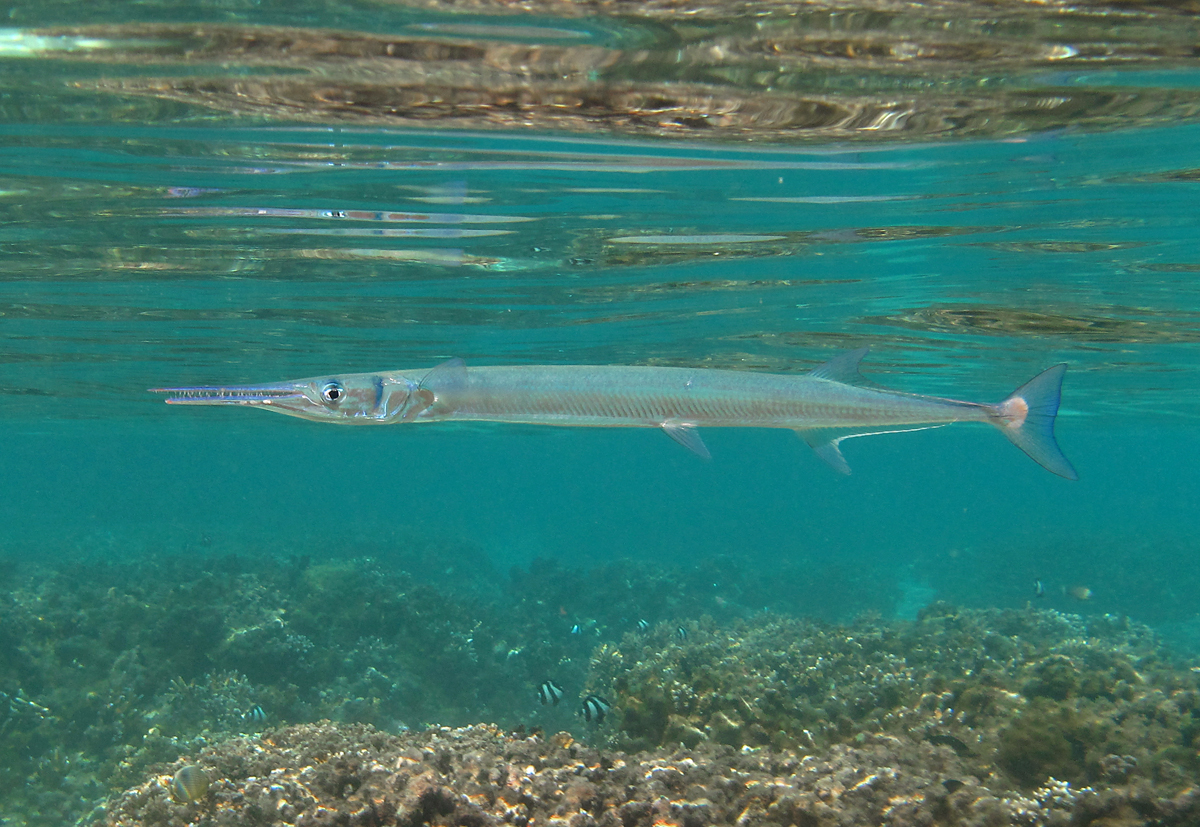
- T. c. crocodilus near Réunion

Conservation status
- Least Concern (IUCN 3.1)

Scientific classification
- Kingdom: Animalia
- Phylum: Chordata
- Class: Actinopterygii
- Division: Teleostei
- Order: Beloniformes
- Family: Belonidae
- Genus: Tylosurus
- Species: T. crocodilus

Binomial name
- Tylosurus crocodilus (Péron & Lesueur, 1821)

Synonyms
- List: Belone crocodilus Péron & Lesueur, 1821; Strongylura crocodila (Péron & Lesueur, 1821); Strongylura crocodilus (Péron & Lesueur, 1821); Belone coromandelica van Hasselt, 1823; Belone timucoides van Hasselt, 1824; Belone raphidoma Ranzani, 1842; Strongylura raphidoma (Ranzani, 1842); Tylosurus raphidoma (Ranzani, 1842); Belone gigantea Temminck & Schlegel, 1846; Strongylura gigantea (Temminck & Schlegel, 1846); Tylosurus giganteus (Temminck & Schlegel, 1846); Belone annulata Valenciennes, 1846; Tylosurus annulatus (Valenciennes, 1846); Belone gerania Valenciennes, 1846; Belone melanurus Bleeker, 1849; Belone cylindrica Bleeker, 1850; Belone crassa Poey, 1860; Belone melanochira Poey, 1860; Belone koseirensis Klunzinger, 1871; Tylosurus gladius Bean, 1882; Esox aaveri Curtiss, 1938

= Houndfish =

Species of fish

The houndfish, or more specifically the crocodile needlefish (Tylosurus crocodilus) is a game fish of the family Belonidae, the needlefishes. It is the largest member of its family, growing up to 5 feet (1.5 m) in length and 10 pounds (4.5 kg) in weight.

== Taxonomy ==
The houndfish was described as Belona crocodila by François Péron and Charles Alexandre Lesueur in 1821 with the type locality given as Mauritius.

Two subspecies of the houndfish were recognised:

- Tylosurus crocodilus crocodilus (Péron & Lesueur 1821)
- Tylosurus crocodilus fodiator Jordan & Gilbert 1882

However, Fishbase now recognises T.c. fodiator as a valid species, Tylosurus fodiator, the Mexican needlefish.

== Description ==
A key way of distinguishing the houndfish from other members of the genus Tylosurus is that the houndfish's teeth point anteriorly when the fish is a juvenile. The teeth of other species are straight at all ages. The houndfish also has a more stout, cylindrical body and a shorter head than other needlefishes. Juvenile houndfish possess an elevated, black lobe on the posterior of their dorsal fins.

While the houndfish has no fin spines, its dorsal fin has 21–25 soft rays, and its anal fin has 19–22. They are also known to have 80–86 vertebrae. They have dark blue backs and silver-white sides and are plain white ventrally. A houndfish has a distinct keel on the caudal peduncle, and the caudal fin itself is deeply forked.

The longest recorded houndfish was 150 centimetres (4.9 ft), and the largest recorded weight was 6.35 kilograms (14.0 lb).

== Distribution and habitat ==
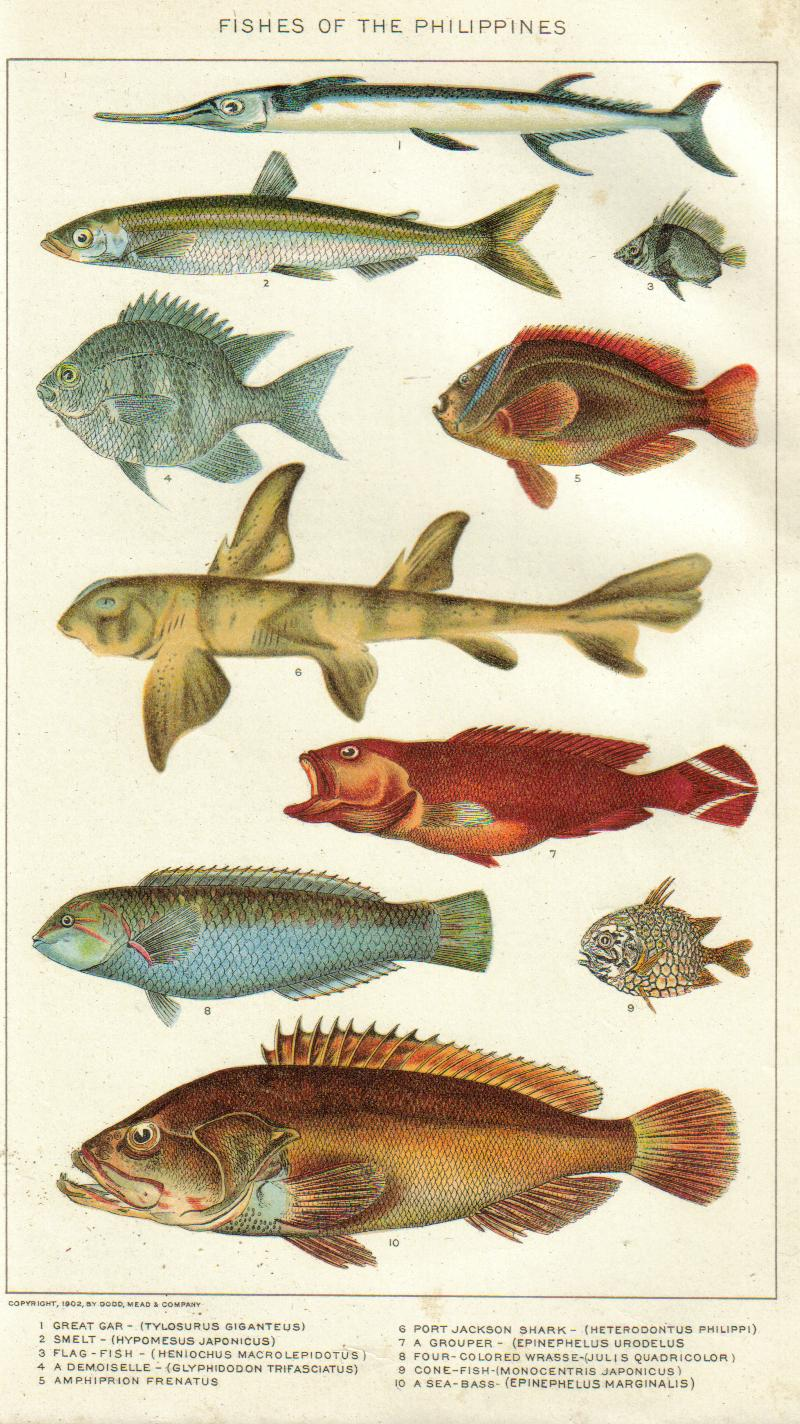
Houndfish (top) illustrated with several other known fishes of the Philippines

Houndfish are found throughout the Indian and Pacific Oceans, their range stretching from the Red Sea and the coast of South Africa, east to French Polynesia, towards Japan, and south to New South Wales, Australia. The houndfish is replaced by its congener the Mexican needlefish in the eastern Pacific. Houndfish are known from New Jersey to Brazil in the west Atlantic, and in the east, they are found from Fernando Poo, Cameroon, and Liberia to Ascension Island. Houndfish can also be found near Guinea, Senegal and Cape Verde. It has been recorded in the eastern Mediterranean Sea, having moved from the Red Sea via the Suez Canal as part of the Lessepsian migration.

A pelagic animal, houndfish can be found over lagoons and seaward reefs either as individuals or small groups, where they feed mainly on smaller fishes. Houndfish lay eggs which attach themselves to objects in the water via tendrils on the surface of each egg.

== Relationship to humans ==
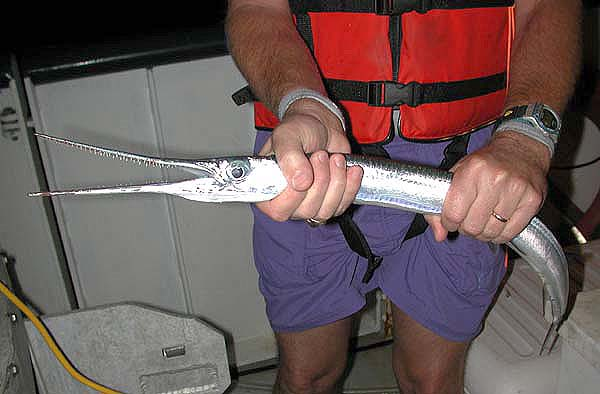
A houndfish caught via use of artificial lights at night

Houndfish are considered to be gamefish, and can be caught by use of artificial lights in a similar manner to other needlefishes. Although houndfish are considered good to eat and usually sold fresh, the market for them is small because their flesh has a greenish colour similar to that of the flat needlefish. The IGFA world record stands at 4.88 kg (10 lbs 12 oz) and was caught off Goulding Cay, Bahamas in 2013 by angler Daniel John Leonard using a live pilchard as bait.

Houndfish are considered to be dangerous, and are feared by fishermen because of their size and tendency to leap out of the water, causing puncture wounds with their beaks, when frightened or attracted to the lights used to catch them. In April 2000, a woman snorkeling in the Florida Keys was severely injured when she was stabbed in the neck by a houndfish that leapt out of the water. In October, 2010 an ocean-kayaker was injured when she was struck in the back (and was treated for a collapsed lung) by the beak of a houndfish that jumped out of the water near her boat.

The danger posed by houndfish is similar to swordfish.
