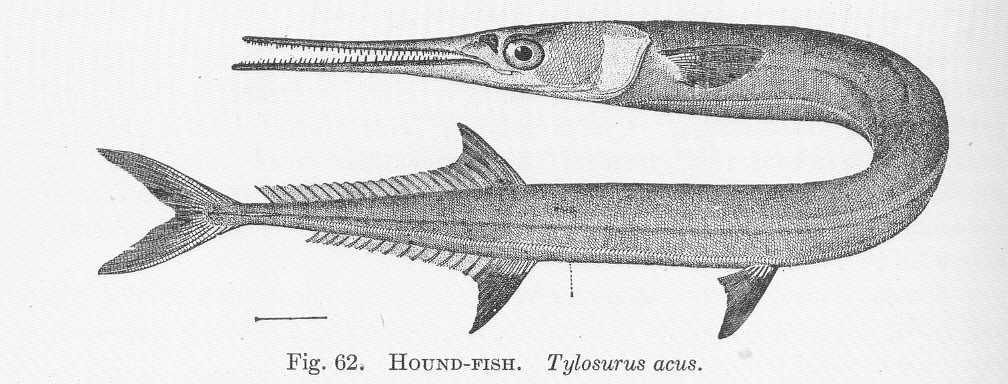

Conservation status
- Least Concern (IUCN 3.1)

Scientific classification
- Kingdom: Animalia
- Phylum: Chordata
- Class: Actinopterygii
- Division: Teleostei
- Order: Beloniformes
- Family: Belonidae
- Genus: Tylosurus
- Species: T. acus

Binomial name
- Tylosurus acus (Lacépède, 1803)

Subspecies
- T. acus acus (Lacepede, 1803); T. a. imperialis (Rafinesque, 1810); T. a. melanotus (Bleeker, 1850); T. a. rafale Collette and Parin, 1970

= Tylosurus acus =

Species of fish

Tylosurus acus (keel-jawed needlefish) is a game fish of the family Belonidae.

== Distribution ==
The keel-jawed needlefish is widespread in the Atlantic and Indo-Pacific oceans.

== Taxonomy ==
There are four recognised subspecies of Tylosurus acus:

- T. a. acus (Lacépède, 1803) (Agujon needlefish) - in the western Atlantic from Massachusetts to Brazil and in the eastern Atlantic off Morocco and in the western Mediterranean
- T. a. imperialis (Rafinesque, 1810) in the Mediterranean Sea and Cape Verde Islands
- T. a. rafale Collette and Parin 1970 (Atlantic agujon needlefish) Gulf of Guinea
- T. a melanotus (Bleeker, 1850) (Keel-jawed needlefish) in the Indo-West Pacific and oceanic islands in the eastern tropical Pacific Revillagigedo Islands, Clipperton Island, and Cocos Island.

Tylosurus pacificus was once considered a subspecies of T. acus but is now considered a distinct species. Although acus was suppressed by ICZN Opinion 900, continued usage of the name led to Tylosurus acus being reinstated as a valid name. Some authorities raise the four subspecies to species level.
