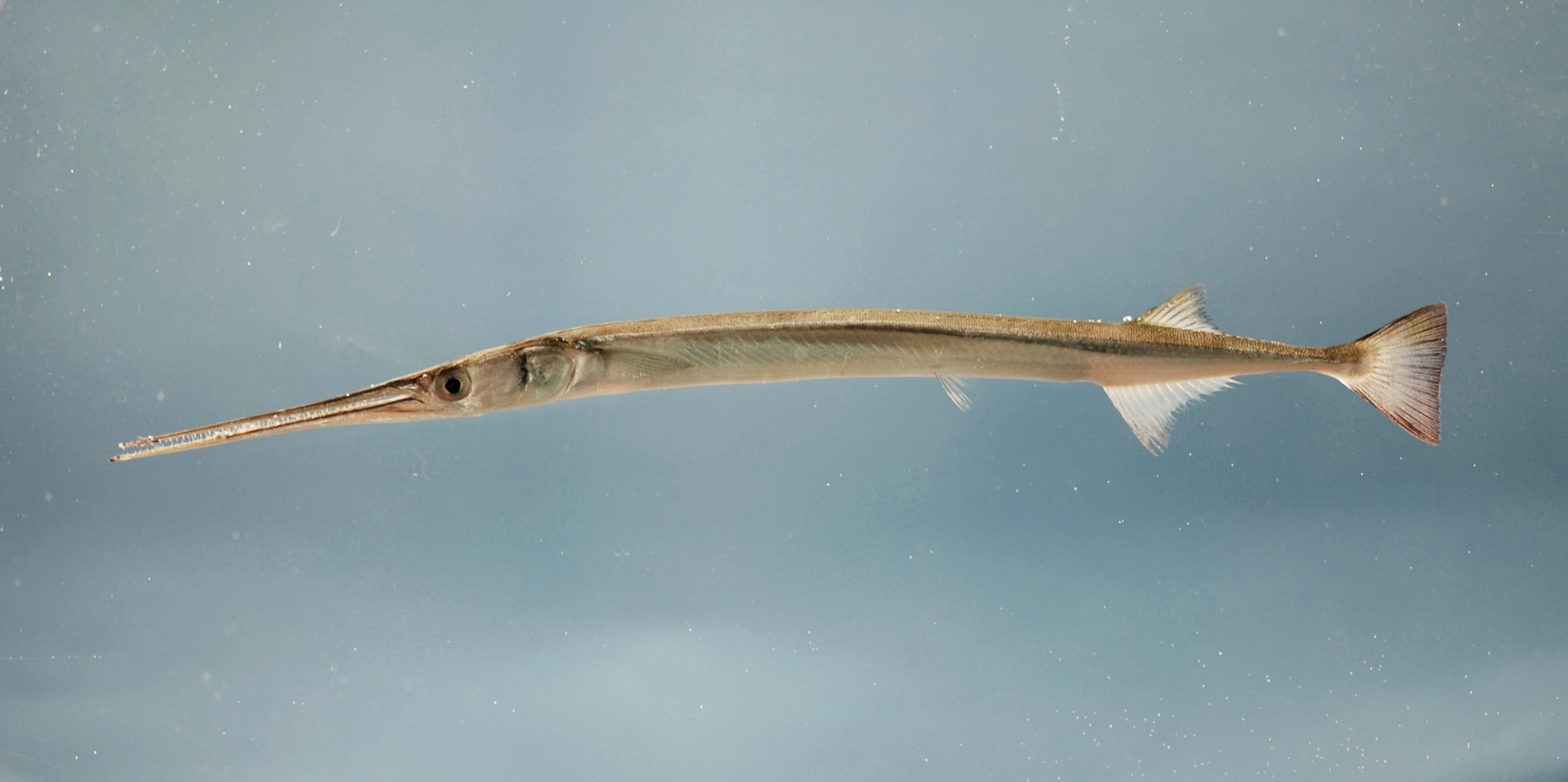

Conservation status
- Least Concern (IUCN 3.1)

Scientific classification
- Kingdom: Animalia
- Phylum: Chordata
- Class: Actinopterygii
- Division: Teleostei
- Order: Beloniformes
- Family: Belonidae
- Genus: Strongylura
- Species: S. marina

Binomial name
- Strongylura marina (Walbaum, 1792)

Synonyms
- Belona truncata Lesueur, 1821; Belone almeida Quoy & Gaimard, 1824; Belone galeata Valenciennes, 1846; Belone houttuyni Bloch & Schneider, 1801; Belone scrutator Girard, 1858; Belone timucu Valenciennes, 1846; Belone truncata Lesueur, 1821; Esox houttuyni Walbaum, 1792; Esox longirostris Mitchill, 1818; Esox marinus Walbaum, 1792

= Strongylura marina =

Species of fish

The Atlantic needlefish (Strongylura marina) is a common demersal needlefish species common in marinas and other areas with minimal currents. Body very elongated, rounded; extremely elongated jaws form a long beak, with numerous needle-like teeth; rear of the top jaw-bone by being exposed when the mouth is closed. It has no gill rakers, the fins without spines; low lobes at the front of the dorsal and anal fins. Its dorsal fin is composed of 14–17 rays, anal fins is composed of 16–20 rays, and pectorals 10–12. Atlantic needlefish are found from Maine to Brazil and have been known to venture into fresh water for short periods, water columns, estuary, and reef associated.

== Geographic range ==
S. marina is found along western Atlantic coastal waters from Maine to southern Brazil, including areas along the coast of the Gulf of Mexico and Caribbean. Atlantic needlefish are not restricted to ocean waters; they can be found in various estuaries and are capable of ascending well upstream into fresh water. S. marina is found in shallow waters throughout the Chesapeake Bay their depth max is 5 ft. In Texas, S. marina is known to inhabit these drainage units: Sabine Lake (including minor coastal drainages west to Galveston Bay), Galveston Bay (including minor coastal drainages west to mouth of Brazos River), Brazos River, Colorado River, San Antonio Bay (including minor coastal drainages west of mouth of Colorado River to the mouth of Nueces River), and Nueces River. S. marina has also been introduced and now inhabits parts of the Tennessee River drainage throughout Alabama and Tennessee.

== Ecology ==
As juveniles, the diet of S. marina consists of 70% shrimp, mysids, and amphipods and 30% fish, while adults are exclusively piscivorous.

The predators of S. marina include larger piscivorous fish such as the Atlantic tarpon (Megalops atlanticus). Less common predators include the common bottlenose dolphin (Tursiops truncatus) and juvenile lemon sharks (Negaprion brevirostris). Since they are surface swimmers, Atlantic needlefish are also preyed upon by some birds. The competitors of S. marina include similar-sized piscivorous fish species such as bonefish. Although the maximum salinity S. marina can tolerate is 36.9 ppt, they are able to adapt to a wide range of salinities, regularly venturing into fresh water.

== Diet ==
The Atlantic Needlefish eat a variety of things based on their body composition. Their diet can range from feeding on shrimp, small fish such as killifishes and silversides. Besides shrimp, small fish, they eat various zooplankton, ranging from zoobenthos to nekton.Their ability to eat is to patiently stalk their prey then goes into the attack by tilting its long pointed mouth sideways into its scissor-like jaw.

== Swimming behavior ==
Anguilliform locomotion is widespread among various aquatic animals and it represents a convergent strategy for being able to move through the water. Elongated fishes in various phylogenetic and ecological disparate families exhibit undulatory locomotion. The Atlantic Needlefish elongated teleost is related to the flying fishes that reside in the surface of water of coastal marine environments. Needlefishes possess a posterior arrangement of dorsal, anal, and caudal fins. The Atlantic Needlefish is a unique anguilliform swimmer that possesses through it prominent fins, which lives in coastal surface-waters, and can be able to propel itself across the surfaces of water to be able to escape predation. There has been no kinematic studies to date that has described the axial kinematics of anguilliform locomotion. Additionally, there has not been any data on the fin kinematics of anguilliform in swimming fishes, despite the fact the median fins may have some contribution substantially to the lateral body profile.

== Life history ==
Spawning typically occurs in late spring and summer. Spawning mostly inshore bays and estuaries. Evidence has suggested that they spawn in river mouths. In Texas, near ripe females have been reported in February. This species is believed to be an iteroparous springtime spawner which mature roughly at the age of 2. The Atlantic Needlefish lays demersal, transparent eggs 3.5-3.6 mm in diameter with chorionic filaments that protrude from the eggs being made. The filaments allow the eggs to remain within tangled mass that attach to submerged plants or other surfaces. Females lay eggs that have many long, filamentous tendrils which attach to floating vegetation or other submerged objects and organisms. S. marina reaches reproductive maturity two years after being hatched. Spawning activity occurs in shallow, inshore habitats with submerged algal masses.

S. marina depends on submerged vegetation for breeding and shelter. In the Gulf of Mexico, the eggs of S. marina attach to sargassum seaweed.

== Conservation ==
S. marina is not currently considered to be a threatened species. It is not of high commercial importance, but a fishery exists for it and it is sometimes taken as bycatch. Sport fishermen take it by angling and seining, and then use it as bait. Located is Golfo Dulce, Costa Rica, the Atlantic Needlefish spend majority of their time offshore. However, few days before the full moon, large schools of the Atlantic Needlefish gather at particular beaches around the gulf to spawn. This event tends to occur in a specific time during the lunar cycle, and it only occurs in a few locations. This event has been occurring for a long time, and for generations, local families have taken advantage of the opportunity to fish, which has been now a tradition that is now limited to preserve local needlefish populations.

== Danger to humans ==
The Atlantic needlefish are predatory schooling fish with an elongated slender jaw that have been known to leap out of the surfaces of water at incredible fast speeds. There have been multiple documents of instances that the Atlantic Needlefish has caused injuries to humans, and the injuries can be more severe than their external appearances would indicate. There have been few cases of penetration of head or neck trauma that have been caused by the fish. However, the report which caused injury to the human is reported to have caused partial spinal cord injury, which was caused by the Needlefish, which has led to beneficial aspects, such as neurosurgical intervention and antibiotic prophylaxis.
