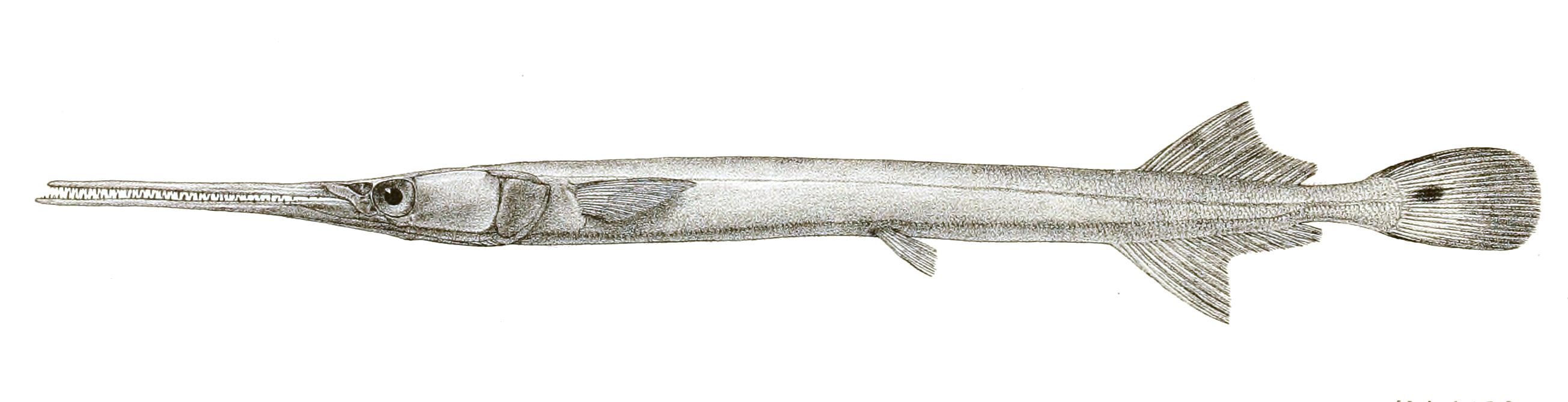

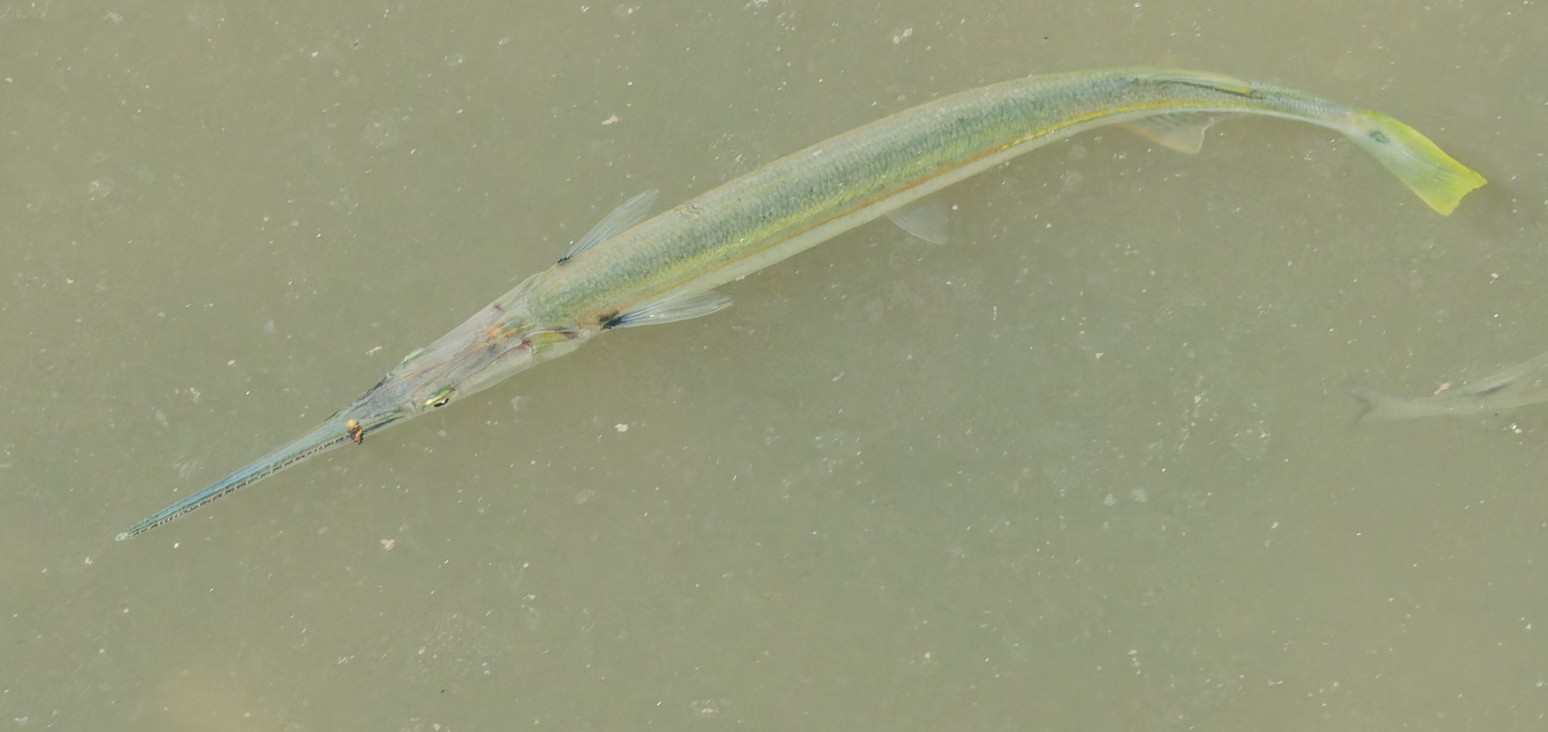

Conservation status
- Least Concern (IUCN 3.1)

Scientific classification
- Kingdom: Animalia
- Phylum: Chordata
- Class: Actinopterygii
- Division: Teleostei
- Order: Beloniformes
- Family: Belonidae
- Genus: Strongylura
- Species: S. strongylura

Binomial name
- Strongylura strongylura (van Hasselt, 1823)

Synonyms
- Belone strongylura an Hasselt, 1823; Tylosurus strongylura (van Hasselt, 1823); Tylosurus strongylurus (van Hasselt, 1823); Strongylura caudimaculata van Hasselt, 1824; Belone caudimacula Cuvier, 1829; Belone oculata Leschenault, 1846; Belone saigonensis Sauvage, 1879

= Strongylura strongylura =

Species of fish

Strongylura strongylura, the spottail needlefish or blackspot longtom, is a species of needlefish from the family Belonidae. It is found in the Indian and western Pacific Oceans from the Persian Gulf east to Australia and the Philippines. This species occurs in coastal waters and in mangrove-lined lagoons as well as being recorded in estuarine areas and it has even entered freshwater. Living S. strongylura have been found alive and buried in mud during low tide. It is piscivorous, feeding mainly on clupeoids. This species is oviparous and the eggs adhere to objects in the water which catch the tendrils which cover the surface of the egg. Strongylura strongylura under the synonym of Strongylura caudimaculata is the type species of the genus Strongylura. It as originally described as Belone strongylura by Johan Coenraad van Hasselt in 1823 with the type locality given as Vizagapatam, India.
