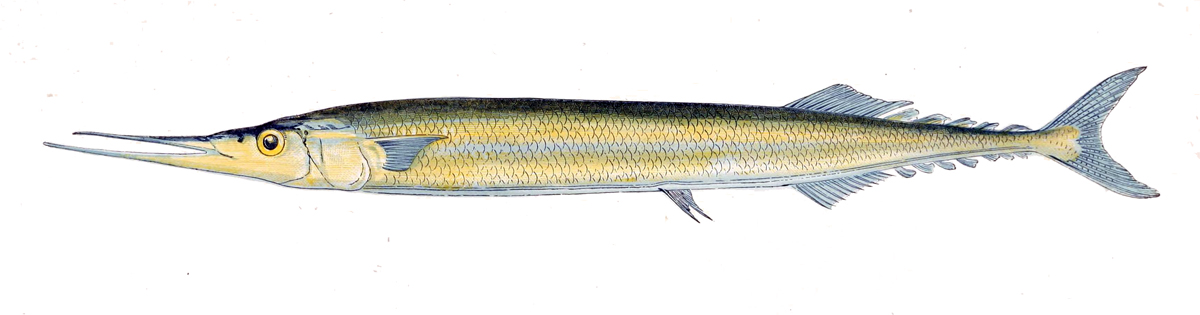
- Atlantic Saury (S. saurus)

Scientific classification
- Kingdom: Animalia
- Phylum: Chordata
- Class: Actinopterygii
- Division: Teleostei
- Order: Beloniformes
- Family: Scomberesocidae
- Genus: Scomberesox; Lacépède, 1803

Type species
- Scomberesox camperii Lacépède, 1803

= Scomberesox =

Genus of fishes

Scomberesox is a genus of sauries. It is one of two in the family Scomberesocidae. The generic name Scomberesox is a compound of scomber (which is derived from the Greek skombros, meaning 'mackerel') and the Latin esox meaning pike.

== Species ==
There are currently three recognized species in this genus:

- Scomberesox saurus (Walbaum, 1792) (Atlantic saury)
- Scomberesox scombroides (J. Richardson, 1843) (King gar)
- Scomberesox simulans (C. L. Hubbs & Wisner, 1980) (Dwarf saury)
