= Strongylura krefftii =

Scientific classification
- Kingdom: Animalia
- Phylum: Chordata
- Class: Actinopterygii
- Division: Teleostei
- Order: Beloniformes
- Family: Belonidae
- Genus: Strongylura
- Species: S. krefftii

Binomial name
- Strongylura krefftii (Günther, 1866)

Synonyms
- Belone krefftii Günther, 1866; Stenocaulus perornatus Whitley, 1938

Species of fish

The long tom or freshwater longtom (Strongylura krefftii) is a species of euryhaline needlefish native to Northern Australia and Papua New Guinea.: This species occurs in the coastal rivers of tropical Australia and New Guinea. In Australia it has been recorded from the Fitzroy River in Western Australia to the Dawson River in Queensland. It is found in areas of still or flowing water in larger rivers from the tidal reaches to far inland and adults are infrequently recorded in coastal marine waters. Preferred habitats include river channels, floodplain lagoons, muddy creeks and billabongs where it often shelters below overhanging vegetation or among submerged roots. It is a nocturnal hunter of small fishes, crustaceans and insects with the adults being almost exclusively piscivorous, ambushing their prey from cover. Strongylura krefftii was described as Belone krefftii by Albert Günther in 1866 with the type locality given as "Australia (not Sydney)". The specific name honours the Australian zoologist Gerard Krefft (1830–1881) who presented Günther with the type.
