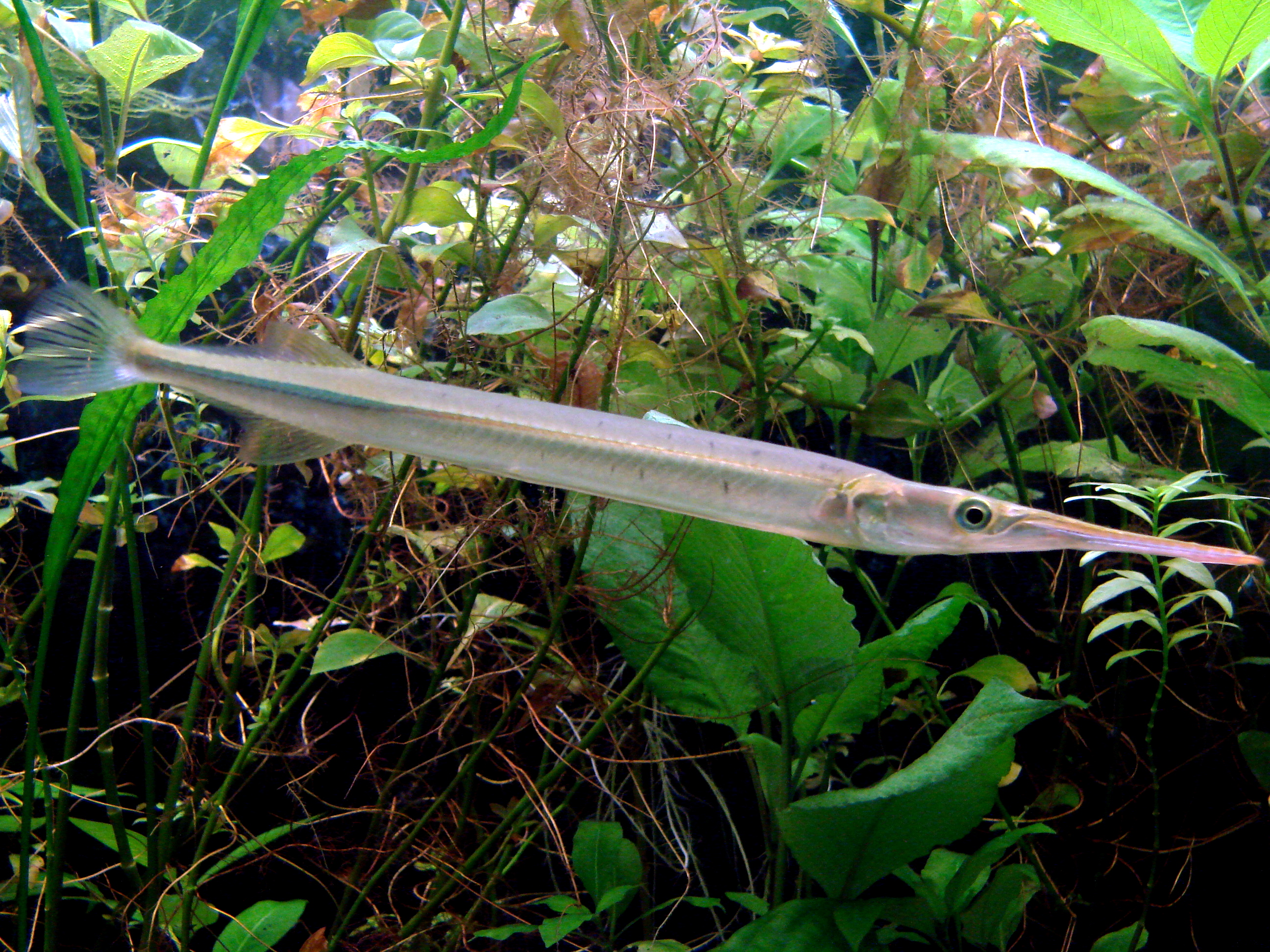

Conservation status
- Least Concern (IUCN 3.1)

Scientific classification
- Kingdom: Animalia
- Phylum: Chordata
- Class: Actinopterygii
- Order: Beloniformes
- Family: Belonidae
- Genus: Xenentodon
- Species: X. cancila

Binomial name
- Xenentodon cancila (F. Hamilton, 1822)

Synonyms
- Esox cancila Hamilton, 1822; Belone cancila (Hamilton, 1822); Xenenthodon cancila (Hamilton, 1822); Belone graii Sykes, 1839; Esox indica McClelland, 1842; Esox hindostanicus Falconer, 1868; Xenentodon canciloides (non Bleeker, 1853) misapplied

= Xenentodon cancila =

Species of fish

Xenentodon cancila, the freshwater garfish, is a species of needlefish found in freshwater and brackish habitats in South and Southeast Asia.

== Common names ==
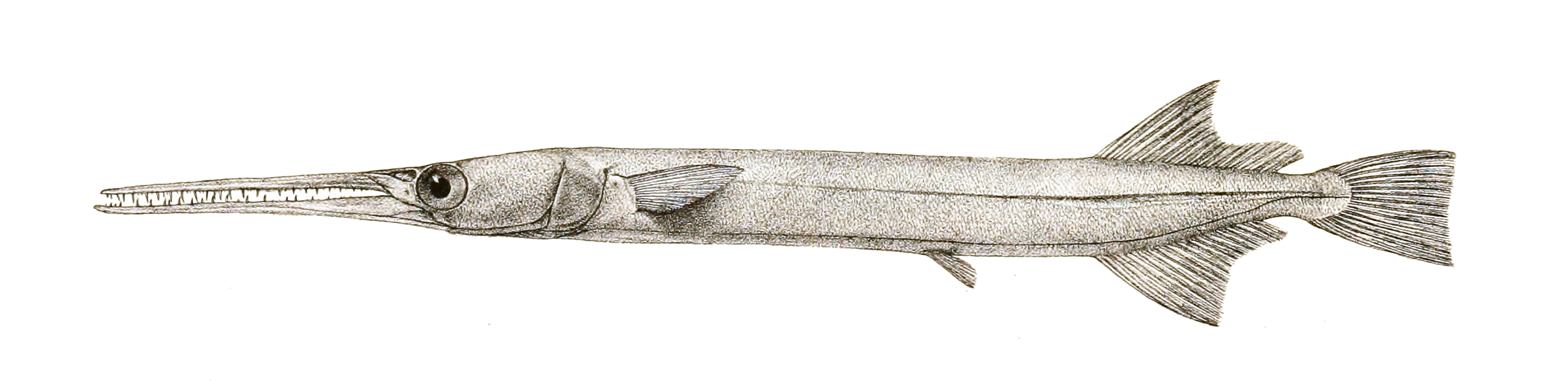

As a reasonably popular aquarium fish, Xenentodon cancila has been traded under a variety of common names, including needlefish, silver needlefish, Asian freshwater needlefish, needlenose halfbeak, freshwater gar, needlenose gar and numerous others. While belonging to the same family as the marine needlefish known in Europe as gar or garpike, Belone belone, these fish are much more distantly related to other fishes sometimes called gars (such as the North American gars and South American pike characins). In Assam it is locally known as Kokila. It is known as "Yonna (යොන්නා) or Habarali (හබරලි)" in Sri Lanka.

== Distribution ==
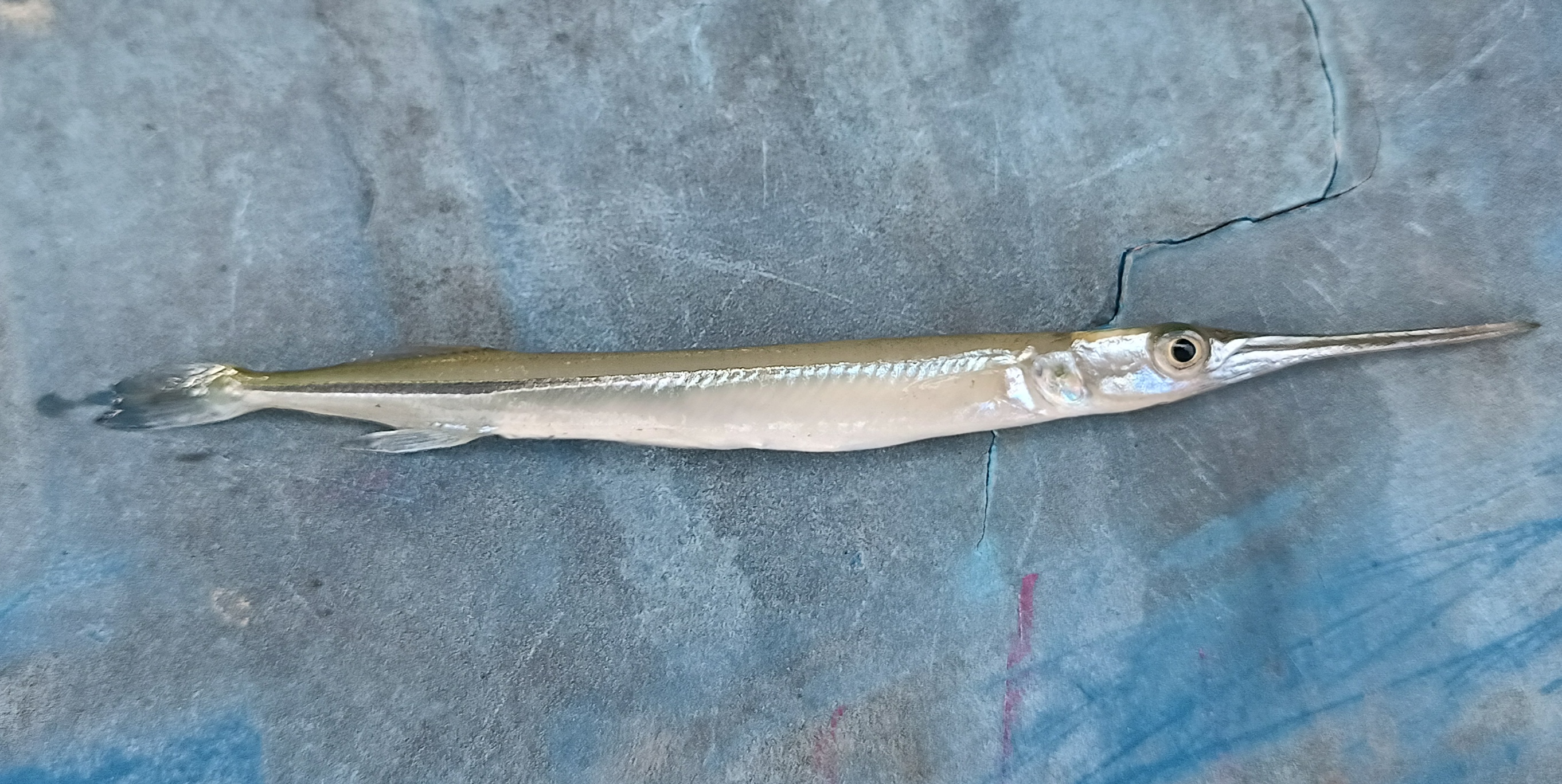
Xenentodon cancila

The freshwater garfish is widely distributed across South and Southeast Asia from India and Sri Lanka to the Malaysian Peninsula.

== Morphology ==
In common with other needlefish, this species has an elongate body with long, beak-like jaws filled with teeth. The dorsal and anal fins are positioned far back along the body close to the tail. The body is silvery-green, darker above and lighter below with a dark band running horizontally along the flank. Slight sexual dimorphism exists, the male fish often having anal and dorsal fins with a black edge. It reaches a length of 40 cm (16 in).

== Diet ==
While aquarium books tend to describe this fish as a predator that eats animals such as fish and frogs, its natural diet appears to consist almost entirely of crustaceans.

== Reproduction ==
This species is oviparous. In aquaria at least, spawning takes place in the morning, with small numbers of eggs being deposited among plants. The eggs are about 3.5 mm (0.14 in) in diameter and are attached to plant leaves with sticky threads about 20 mm (0.79 in). The eggs take ten days to hatch, at which point the fry are almost 12 mm (0.47 in) long. At this point they will eat small live foods including week-old labyrinth fish.

== Human significance ==
Freshwater needlefish support minor fisheries and are also traded as aquarium fish.

=== In the aquarium ===
The freshwater needlefish is one of several of needlefish species kept in public and home aquaria. It has been kept by European aquarists since 1910, and was first bred in captivity at the Biological Station Wilhelminenberg, Austria in 1963. Xenentodon cancila is generally considered quite a difficult species to maintain because of its large size, nervous behaviour, and preference for live foods. Alongside misunderstandings of the natural diet of these fish, there has been confusion over the optimal water conditions required by this species when kept in home aquaria, with the addition of salt to the water often being recommended. These fish do perfectly well in freshwater aquaria.

== See also ==
- Paracapillaria xenentodoni
