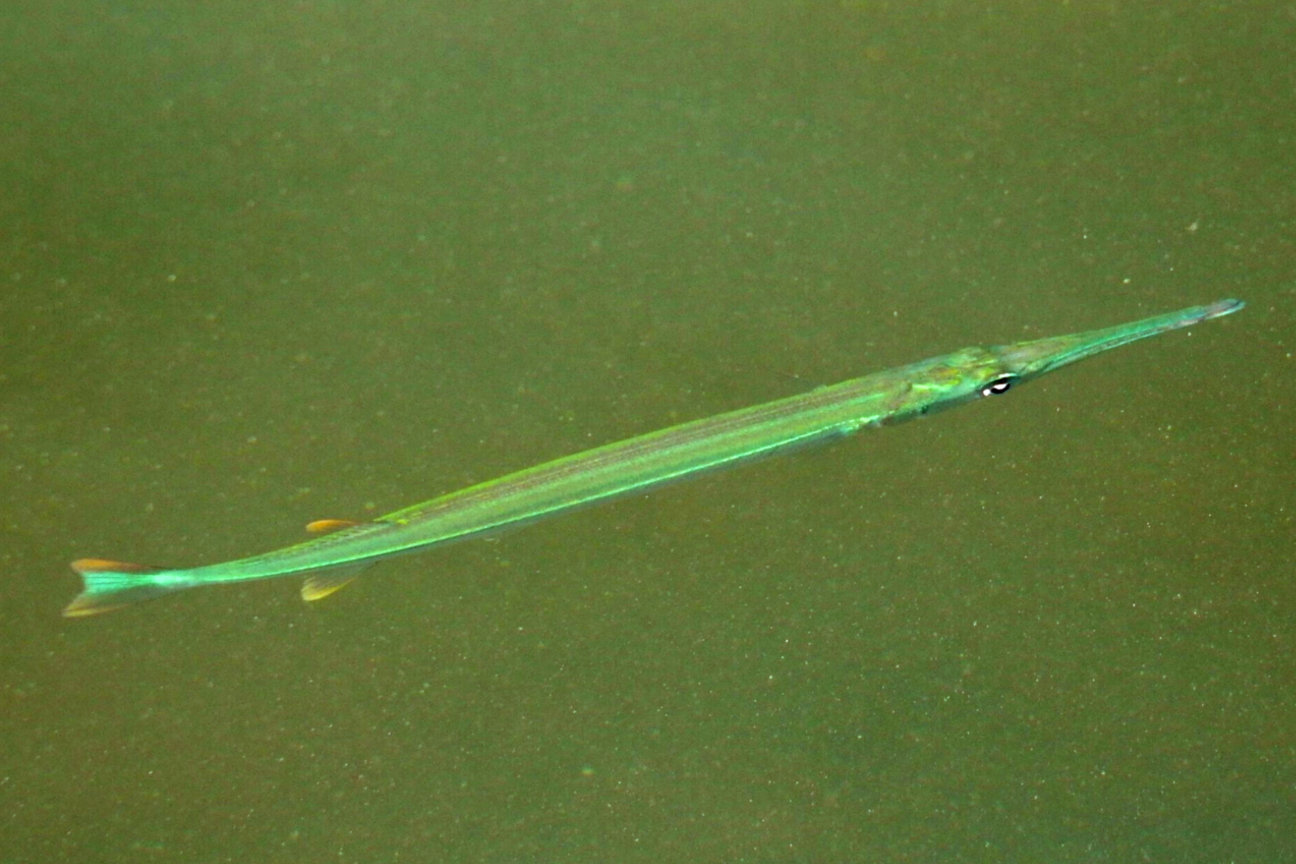

Scientific classification
- Kingdom: Animalia
- Phylum: Chordata
- Class: Actinopterygii
- Order: Beloniformes
- Family: Belonidae
- Genus: Strongylura
- Species: S. notata

Binomial name
- Strongylura notata Poey, 1860

Subspecies
- Strongylura notata forsythia Breder, 1932; Strongylura notata notata Poey, 1860

= Strongylura notata =

Species of fish

Strongylura notata, the redfin needlefish or agujon, is a species of fish in the family Belonidae.

== Description ==
Fully grown adults can reach a length of 61 centimetres (24 in).

== Habitat ==
The species mostly inhabits marine and brackish waters and may enter freshwater habitats.

== Distribution ==
The nominate subspecies, S. n. notata, occurs in the Western Central Atlantic around Cuba, Jamaica, Mexico, Belize, and Honduras, and has also been reported from Bermuda. S. n. forsythia has been reported from the Bahamas, southern Florida, and the Gulf of Mexico west to Mobile Bay, Alabama.
