= Cape needlefish =

Scientific classification
- Kingdom: Animalia
- Phylum: Chordata
- Class: Actinopterygii
- Order: Beloniformes
- Family: Belonidae
- Genus: Petalichthys; Regan, 1904
- Species: P. capensis

Binomial name
- Petalichthys capensis Regan, 1904

Species of fish

The Cape needlefish (Petalichthys capensis) is a species of needlefish endemic to coastal South Africa. This species grows to a standard length of 35 cm (14 in). P. capensis is found in large schools in pelagic-oceanic environments in subtropical climates. The typical length of this species is about 30 cm (12 in). Body colouration is a silver and blueish colour. The eggs of this species can be found hanging onto objects in the water, as they have tendrils that latch onto the objects.
