= Platybelone lovii =

Scientific classification
- Kingdom: Animalia
- Phylum: Chordata
- Class: Actinopterygii
- Order: Beloniformes
- Family: Belonidae
- Genus: Platybelone
- Species: P. lovii

Binomial name
- Platybelone lovii (Günther, 1866)

Synonyms
- Belone lovii Günther, 1866 Platybelone argalus lovii(Günther, 1866)

Species of fish

Platybelone lovii is a species of needlefish from the family Belonidae. It is a predatory, pelagic fish which is endemic to the eastern Atlantic Ocean in the waters around Cape Verde. This species was described by Albert Günther in 1866 as Belone lovii and was named in honour of the British naturalist Richard Thomas Lowe (1802-1874).
