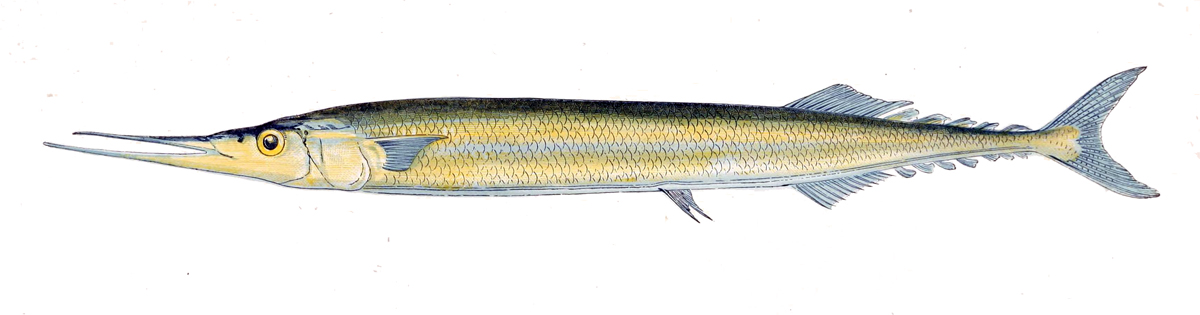

Conservation status
- Least Concern (IUCN 3.1)

Scientific classification
- Kingdom: Animalia
- Phylum: Chordata
- Class: Actinopterygii
- Order: Beloniformes
- Family: Scomberesocidae
- Genus: Scomberesox
- Species: S. saurus

Binomial name
- Scomberesox saurus (Walbaum, 1792)

Synonyms
- Esox saurus Walbaum, 1792; Belone saurus (Walbaum, 1792); Esox brasiliensis Pennant, 1787; Scomberesox camperii Lacépède, 1803; Sayris hians Rafinesque, 1810; Sayris serrata Rafinesque, 1810; Sayris bimaculatus Rafinesque, 1810; Sayris recurvirostra Rafinesque, 1810; Sayris maculata Rafinesque, 1810; Scomberesox equirostrum Lesueur, 1821; Scomberesox scutellatum Lesueur, 1821; Scomberesox storeri Dekay, 1842; Scombresox rondeletii Valenciennes, 1846; Grammiconotus bicolor Costa, 1862

= Atlantic saury =

Species of fish

The Atlantic saury (Scomberesox saurus) is a fish of the family Scomberesocidae found in the North Atlantic Ocean from the Gulf of Saint Lawrence, Canada south to Bermuda and North Carolina in the western Atlantic and from Iceland to Morocco in the eastern Atlantic, it is also found in the Mediterranean Sea, the Adriatic Sea and the Aegean Sea.

== Description ==
The Atlantic saury is an elongated slender fish with very long, beak-like jaws with minute teeth. The fish grow to about 35 cm (14 in) in length, with a maximum length of 50 cm (20 in). They have a row of finlets behind their dorsal and anal fins. They are similar in appearance to garfish but differ in having much smaller teeth. Atlantic sauries live near the surface, and will often jump above the surface.

== Distribution and habitat ==
The Atlantic saury is native to the northern Atlantic Ocean, being present off the coast of North America, from the Gulf of Saint Lawrence to North Carolina and Bermuda, and off the coast of Western Europe. It has occasionally been recorded as far north as Iceland, Norway and Denmark, the British Isles and the Baltic Sea, its main range is further south in the Atlantic, the Mediterranean Sea including the Adriatic Sea and the Aegean Seas and the coast of Tunisia and Morocco. Its depth range is down to about 30 m (100 ft). When it was caught off the coast of Pembrokeshire in 1904, it was not recognised as a British fish, but with warming sea temperatures, it is expanding its range northwards.

== Ecology ==
The fish are gregarious, feeding on zooplankton and fish larvae, and are hunted by tuna, marlin, bluefish and cod. It is a migratory fish, moving inshore during the summer and back out into deep water later in the year. Spawning takes place near the surface in the open sea. The eggs have filaments attached and are pelagic. The juveniles inhabit tropical mid-oceanic waters; their jaws are relatively short at first, but elongate as they grow.
