= Belonion =

Scientific classification
- Kingdom: Animalia
- Phylum: Chordata
- Class: Actinopterygii
- Order: Beloniformes
- Family: Belonidae
- Genus: Belonion; Collette, 1966

Type species
- Belonion apodion Collette, 1966

Genus of fishes

Belonion is a genus of freshwater needlefishes native to South America. It is one of 10 genera in the family Belonidae.

== Species ==
Two recognized species are in this genus:

- Belonion apodion Collette, 1966
- Belonion dibranchodon Collette, 1966
