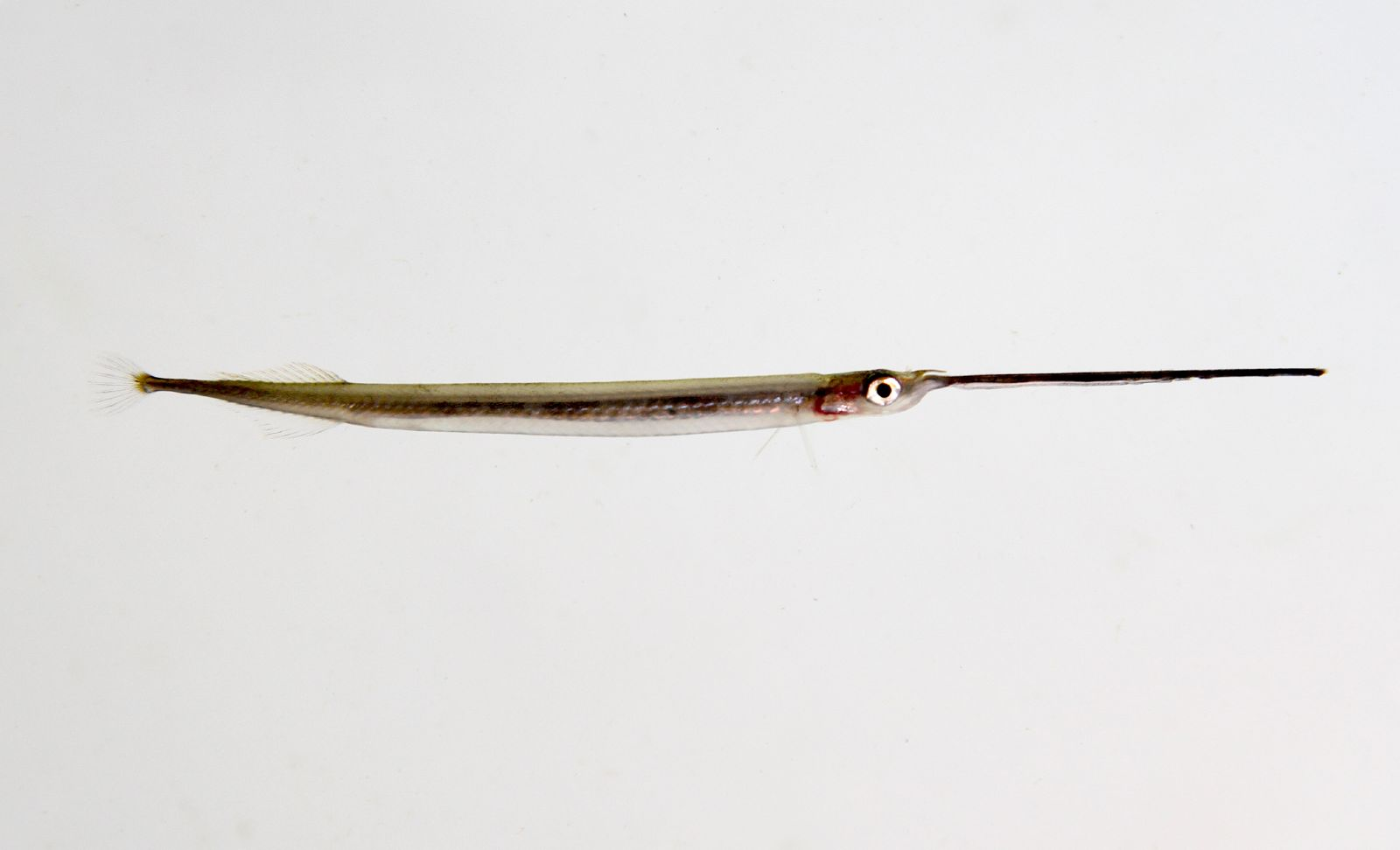
- P. guianensis

Scientific classification
- Domain: Eukaryota
- Kingdom: Animalia
- Phylum: Chordata
- Class: Actinopterygii
- Order: Beloniformes
- Family: Belonidae
- Genus: Potamorrhaphis; Günther, 1866

Type species
- Belone taeniata Günther, 1866

= Potamorrhaphis =

Genus of fishes

Potamorrhaphis is a genus of freshwater needlefishes native to South America.

== Species ==
Four recognized species are in this genus:

- Potamorrhaphis eigenmanni A. Miranda-Ribeiro, 1915
- Potamorrhaphis guianensis (Jardine, 1843)
- Potamorrhaphis labiatus Sant'Anna, Delapieve & R. E. dos Reis, 2012
- Potamorrhaphis petersi Collette, 1974
