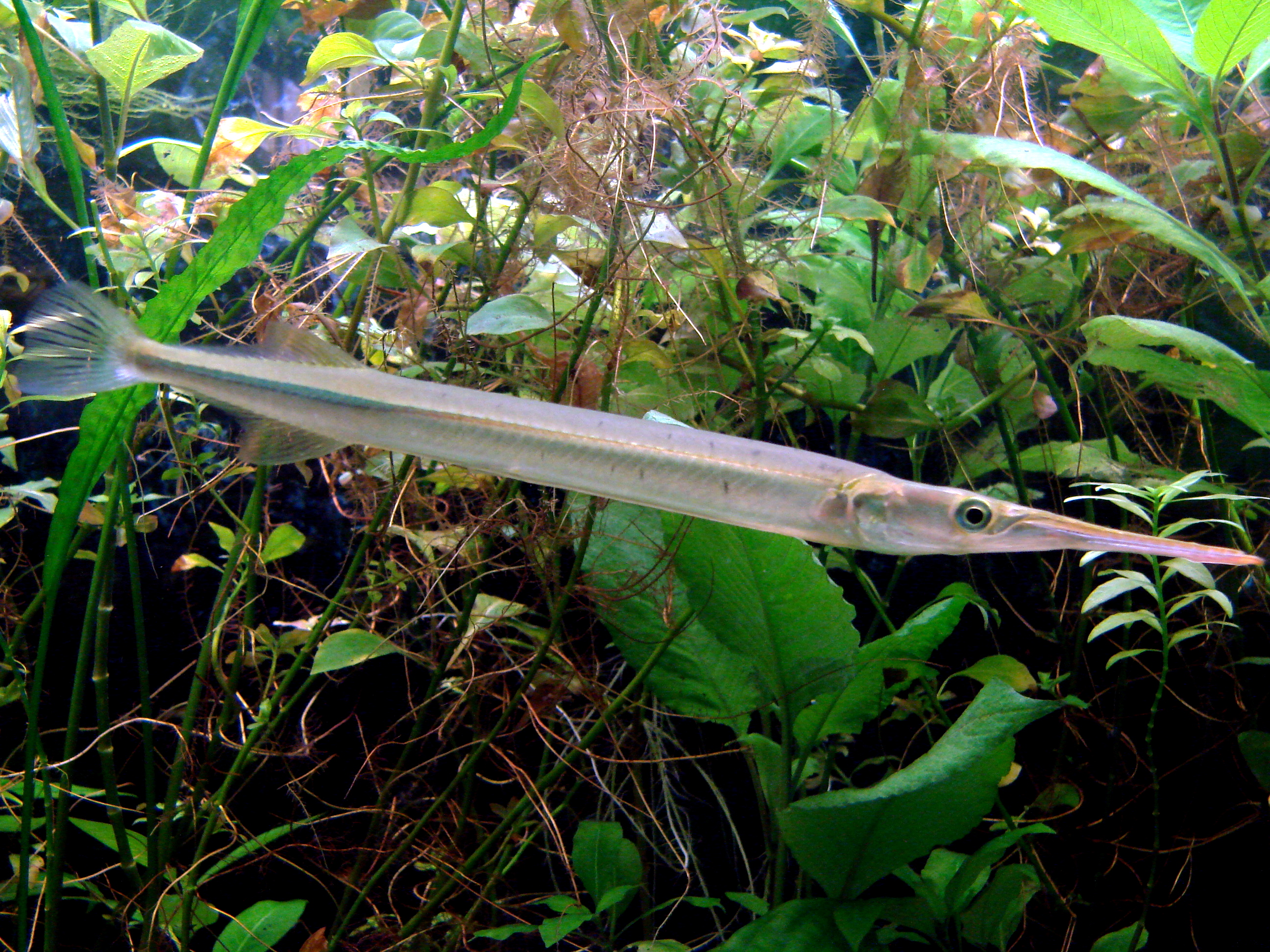
- Freshwater Garfish (X. cancila)

Scientific classification
- Kingdom: Animalia
- Phylum: Chordata
- Class: Actinopterygii
- Order: Beloniformes
- Family: Belonidae
- Genus: Xenentodon; Regan, 1911

Type species
- Esox cancila Hamilton, 1822

= Xenentodon =

Genus of fishes

Xenentodon is a genus of freshwater needlefishes native to southeast Asia. It is one of ten genera in the family Belonidae.

== Species ==
There are currently two recognized species in this genus:

- Xenentodon cancila (F. Hamilton, 1822) (Freshwater Garfish)
- Xenentodon canciloides (Bleeker, 1854)
