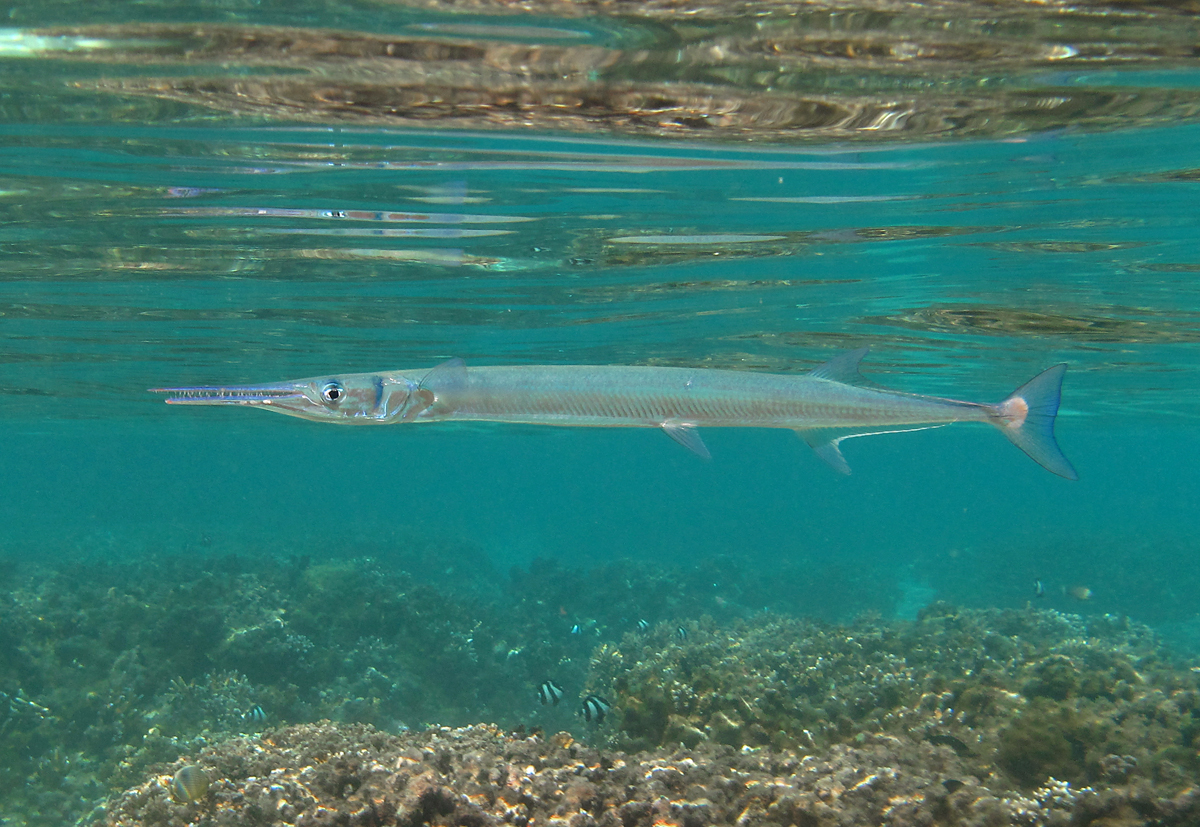
- Houndfish (T. crocodilus)

Scientific classification
- Kingdom: Animalia
- Phylum: Chordata
- Class: Actinopterygii
- Division: Teleostei
- Order: Beloniformes
- Family: Belonidae
- Genus: Tylosurus; Cocco, 1833

Type species
- Tylosurus cantrainei Cocco, 1833

= Tylosurus =

Genus of fishes

Tylosurus is a genus of needlefish, one of ten in the family Belonidae. They are found worldwide in tropical and warmer temperate seas and two species have been recorded as Lessepsian migrants in the eastern Mediterranean Sea.

== Species ==
The seven currently recognized species in this genus are:

- Tylosurus acus (Lacepède, 1803)
  - T. a. acus (Lacépède, 1803) (Agujon needlefish)
  - T. a. imperialis (Rafinesque, 1810)
  - T. a. melanotus (Bleeker, 1850) (keel-jawed needlefish)
  - T. a. rafale Collette & Parin, 1970 (Atlantic agujon needlefish)
- Tylosurus choram (Rüppell, 1837) (Red Sea houndfish)
- Tylosurus crocodilus (Péron & Lesueur, 1821) (Houndfish or crocodile needlefish)
- Tylosurus fodiator D. S. Jordan & C. H. Gilbert, 1882 (Mexican needlefish)
- Tylosurus gavialoides (Castelnau, 1873) (Stout long tom)
- Tylosurus pacificus (Steindachner, 1876) (Pacific agujon needlefish)
- Tylosurus punctulatus (Günther, 1872) (Spotted long tom)

== Etymology ==
The generic name Tylosurus is a compound created from the Greek words tylos meaning a "callus" and oura meaning "tail", this refers to the keel like structures on the caudal peduncle of these fish.
