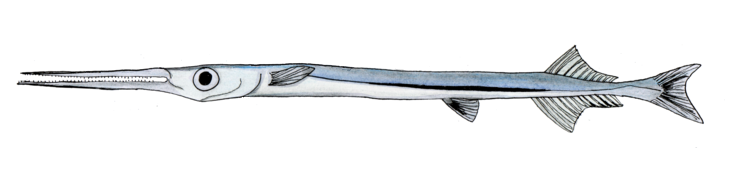
- Platybelone argalus

Scientific classification
- Kingdom: Animalia
- Phylum: Chordata
- Class: Actinopterygii
- Order: Beloniformes
- Family: Belonidae
- Genus: Platybelone; Fowler, 1919

Type species
- Belone platyura Bennett, 1832

= Platybelone =

Genus of fishes

Platybelone is a genus of needlefish from the family Belonidae found in the marine habitats of Indo-Pacific to Atlantic ocean.

== Species ==
The following two species are currently recognised:

- Platybelone argalus (Lesueur, 1821)
- Platybelone lovii (Günther, 1866)
