= Pseudotylosurus =

Scientific classification
- Domain: Eukaryota
- Kingdom: Animalia
- Phylum: Chordata
- Class: Actinopterygii
- Order: Beloniformes
- Family: Belonidae
- Genus: Pseudotylosurus; Fernández-Yépez, 1948

Type species
- Pseudotylosurus brasiliensis, a synonym of Pseudotylosurus angusticeps Fernández-Yépez, 1948

Genus of fishes

Pseudotylosurus is a genus of needlefishes native to South America.

== Species ==
Two recognized species are in this genus:

- Pseudotylosurus angusticeps (Günther, 1866)
- Pseudotylosurus microps (Günther, 1866)
