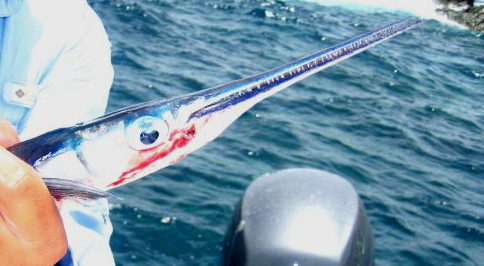

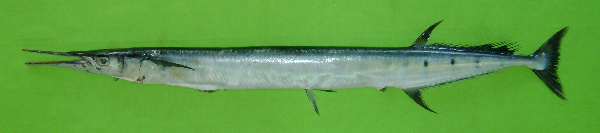

Conservation status
- Least Concern (IUCN 3.1)

Scientific classification
- Kingdom: Animalia
- Phylum: Chordata
- Class: Actinopterygii
- Order: Beloniformes
- Family: Belonidae
- Genus: Ablennes; D. S. Jordan & Fordice, 1887
- Species: A. hians

Binomial name
- Ablennes hians Valenciennes, 1846

Synonyms
- Ablennes pacificus Walford, 1936; Belone hians Valenciennes, 1846; Belone maculata Poey, 1860; Belone melanostigma Valenciennes, 1846; Belone schismatorhynchus Bleeker, 1850; Mastaccembelus melanostigma Valenciennes, 1846; Mastacembelus fasciatus Bleeker, 1873; Tylosurus caeruleofasciatus Stead, 1908; Tylosurus hians Valenciennes, 1846

= Flat needlefish =

Species of fish

The flat needlefish (Ablennes hians), or barred longtom, the only known member of the genus Ablennes, is a marine fish of the family Belonidae. Flat needlefish are considered gamefish, frequently caught with the help of artificial lights, but are not often eaten because of their green-colored flesh.

The generic name Ablennes – formerly misspelled Athlennes – means 'without mucosity', from the ancient Greek privative a- prefix and blennos ('mucus'). Its specific name hians is Latin for "gaping".

== Description ==
Although they have no spines, they do have several soft rays. About 23-26 rays are on the dorsal fin and 24-28 are on the anal fin. They have 86-93 vertebrae. Dorsally, flat needlefish are blueish, white ventrally, with dark blotches and 12-14 vertical bars in the middle of their bodies. Flat needlefish have elongated bodies, with scythe-shaped pectoral and anal fins. They also have a dark lobe on the posterior part of their dorsal fins.

The longest recorded flat needlefish measured 140 cm. Measurements for flat needlefish body length do not include their caudal fins and heads because the fish's long jaws are often broken off. The largest recorded weight for a flat needlefish was 4.8 kg.

== Distribution and habitat ==
Flat needlefish are found worldwide in tropical and temperate seas. In the Eastern Atlantic, they are known from Cape Verde and Dakar to Moçamedes in Angola. In the western Atlantic, they are known from the Chesapeake Bay south to Brazil. They are found throughout the Indian Ocean, and in the western Pacific from the southern islands of Japan to Australia and Tuvalu. A few specimens have been collected from Syria to Israel in the Mediterranean Sea, likely migrants from the Red Sea.

Flat needlefish usually live in neritic ocean waters near islands, estuaries, and near coastal rivers, where they feed on smaller fish and occasionally gather in large schools.

== Reproduction ==
Flat needlefish lay eggs, which attach themselves to floating debris by filaments on the surface of each egg. Only the left gonad in both sexes is developed, and in males, the right gonad is sometimes wholly absent.
