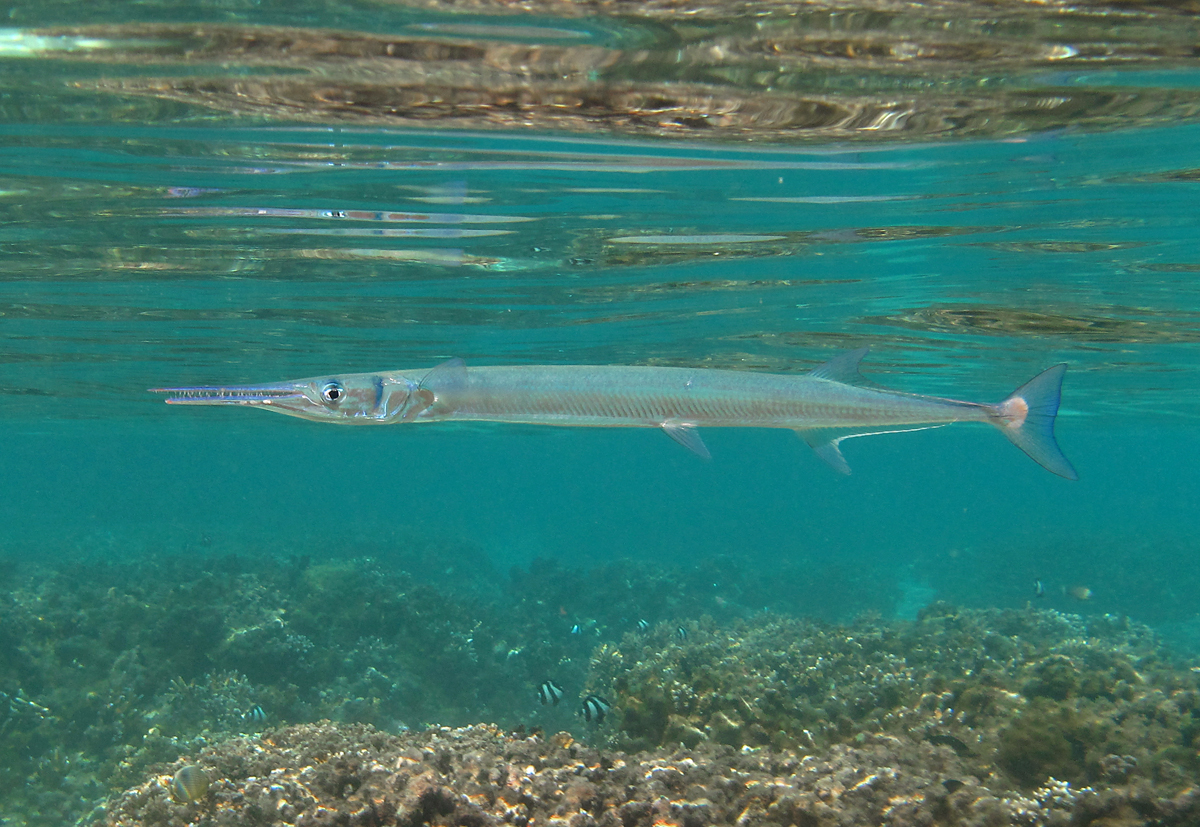
- Tylosurus crocodilus

Scientific classification
- Kingdom: Animalia
- Phylum: Chordata
- Class: Actinopterygii
- Order: Beloniformes
- Superfamily: Scomberesocoidea
- Family: Belonidae; Bonaparte, 1832

Genera
- Ablennes; Belone; Belonion; Petalichthys; Platybelone; Potamorrhaphis; Pseudotylosurus; Strongylura; Tylosurus; Xenentodon

Cladistically included but traditionally excluded taxa
- Scomberesocidae

= Needlefish =

Needlefish (family Belonidae) or long toms are piscivorous fishes primarily associated with very shallow marine habitats or the surface of the open sea. Some genera include species found in marine, brackish, and freshwater environments (e.g., Strongylura), while a few genera are confined to freshwater rivers and streams, including Belonion, Potamorrhaphis, and Xenentodon. Needlefish closely resemble North American freshwater gars (family Lepisosteidae) in being elongated and having long, narrow jaws filled with sharp teeth, and some species of needlefishes are referred to as gars or garfish despite being only distantly related to the true gars. In fact, the name "garfish" was originally used for the needlefish Belone belone in Europe and only later applied to the North American fishes by European settlers during the 18th century.

== Description ==
Needlefish are slender, ranging from 3.0 to 95 cm (1.2 to 37.4 in) in length. They have a single dorsal fin, placed far back on the body, almost opposite to the anal fin. Their most distinctive feature is their long, narrow beak, which bears multiple sharp teeth. In most species, the upper jaw reaches its full length only in adults, so the juveniles have a half-beak appearance, with an elongated lower jaw, but a much smaller upper one. During this stage of their lifecycle, they eat plankton, switching to fish once the beak fully develops. Needlefish reproduce through mating and laying eggs. The male usually rides the female on the waves as they mate.

Needlefish are most common in the subtropics, but some inhabit temperate waters, as well, particularly during the winter. Belone belone, a common North Atlantic species, often swim in schools alongside tuna. Recently, some small specimens have been seen in the Mediterranean Sea.

== Ecology ==
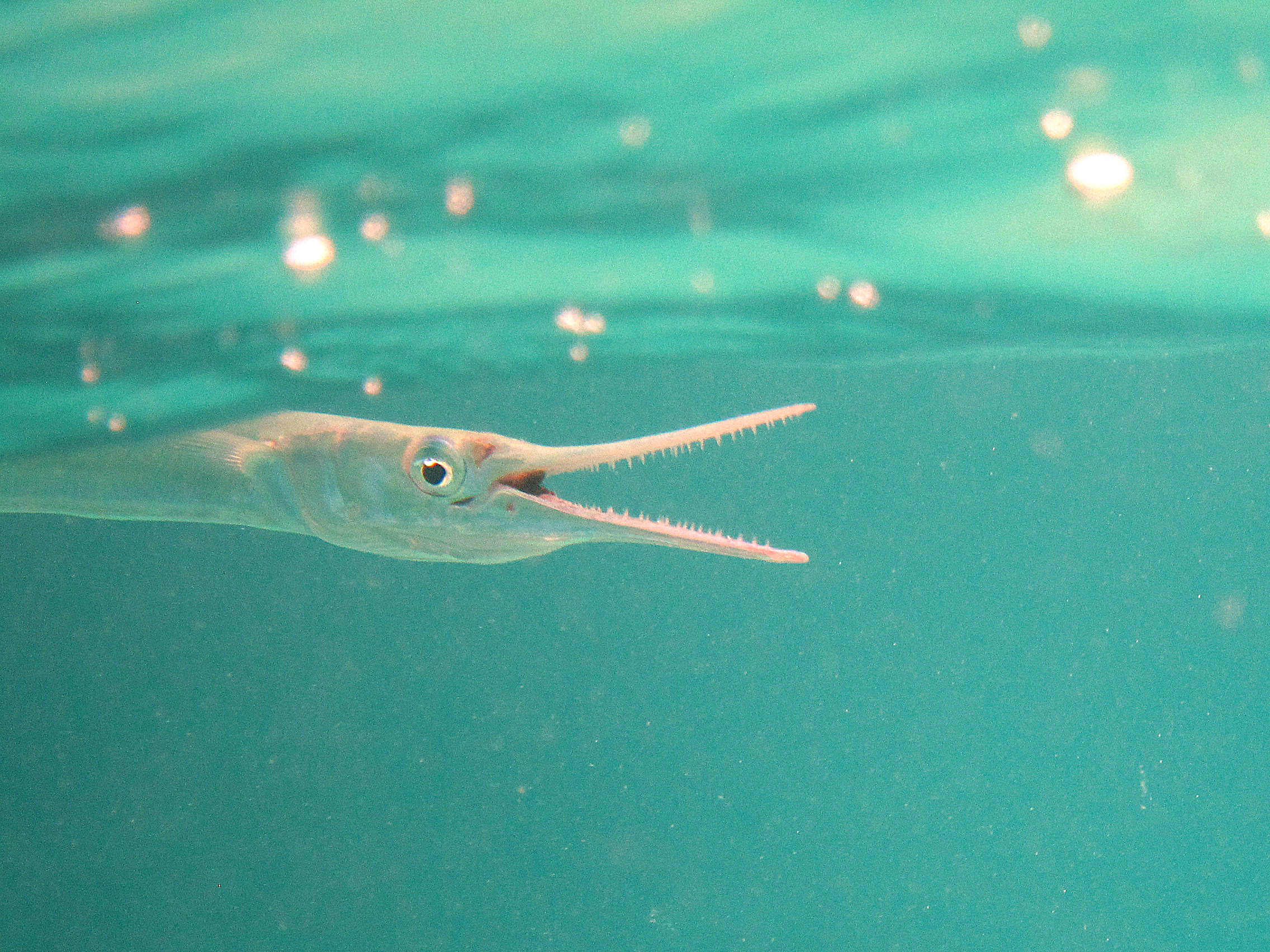
A hunting needlefish

All needlefish feed primarily on smaller fish. In addition, some species also take krill, swimming crustaceans, small cephalopods and insects.

Needlefish have been documented in taking advantage of Snell's Window when attacking prey; leaping at a shallow angle to ambush schools of small fish. Due to light refraction through water, objects at the edges of the window appear distorted, disrupting the image of the leaping needlefish and allowing it to get within very short distances of its prey.

== Danger to humans ==
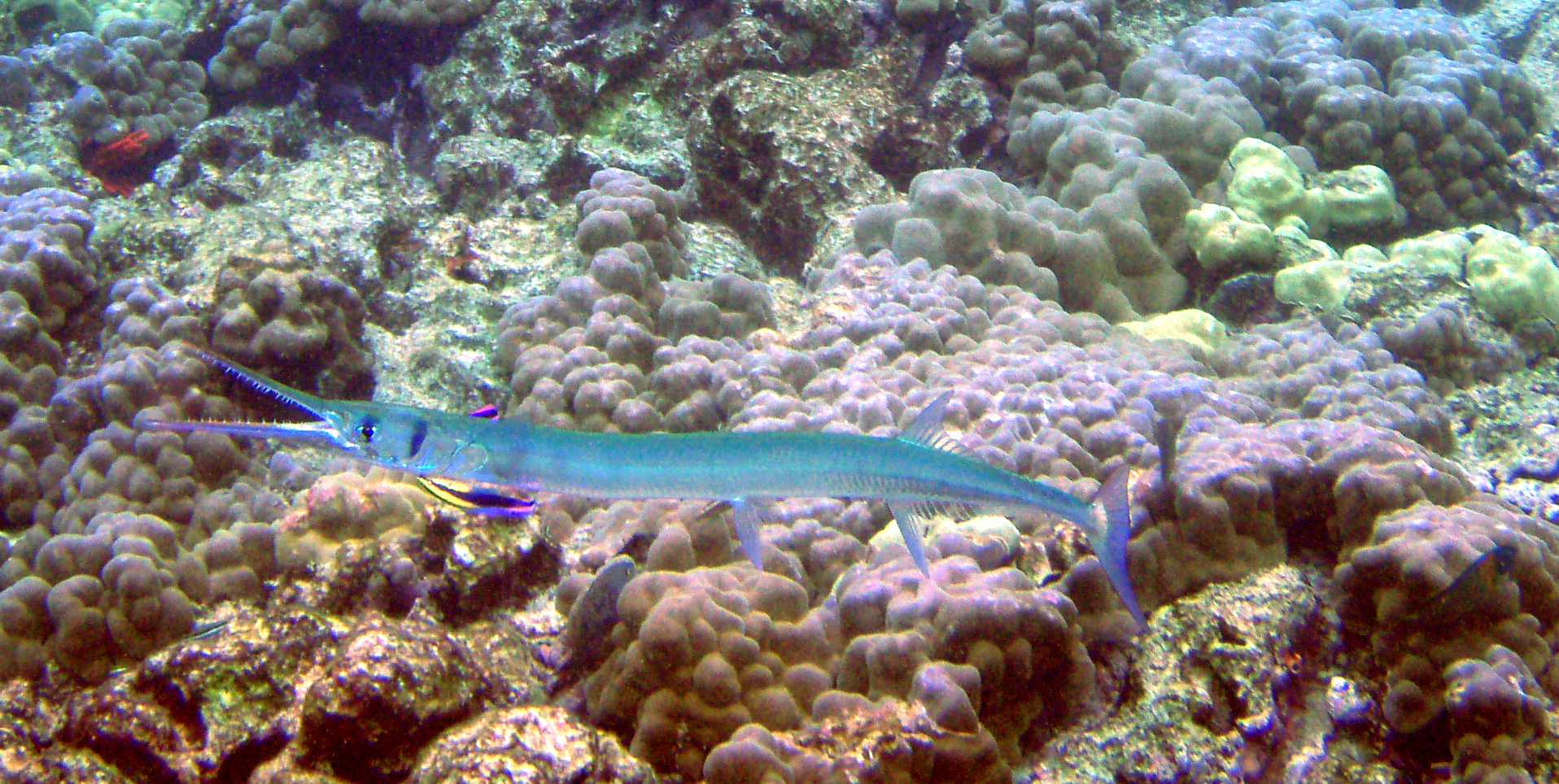
A needlefish being cleaned by cleaner wrasse, Labroides phthirophagus.

Needlefish, like all ray-finned beloniforms, are capable of making short jumps out of the water at up to 60 km/h (37 mph). Since needlefish swim near the surface, they often leap over the decks of shallow boats rather than going around. This jumping activity is greatly excited by artificial light at night; night fisherman and divers in areas across the Pacific Ocean have been "attacked" by schools of suddenly excited needlefish diving across the water towards the light source at high speed. Their sharp beaks are capable of inflicting deep puncture wounds, often breaking off inside the victim in the process. For many traditional Pacific Islander communities, who primarily fish on reefs from low boats, needlefish represent an even greater risk of injury than sharks.

Occasional deaths and serious injuries have been attributed to needlefish. They include the following documented incidents:

- In 1977, a 10-year-old Hawaiian boy, night fishing with his father at Hanamaulu Bay, Kauaʻi, was killed when a 1.0-to-1.2-metre-long (3.3 to 3.9 ft) needlefish jumped from the water and pierced his eye and brain.
- In 2007, a 16-year-old Vietnamese boy was stabbed through the heart and killed by the 15 cm (5.9 in) beak of a needlefish while diving for sea cucumbers at night near Halong Bay.
- In 2010, a kayaker in Florida was nearly killed when a crocodile needlefish (houndfish, Tylosurus crocodilus) leapt from the water and impaled her in the chest.
- In 2012, German kitesurfer Wolfram Reiners was seriously wounded in the foot by a needlefish near the Seychelles.
- In May 2013, a kitesurfer in Egypt's Red Sea was speared directly under his knee when a needlefish jumped out of the water.
- In October 2013, a Saudi Arabian news website also reported the death of a young Saudi man in Dammam who died of hemorrhaging after being hit by a needlefish on the left side of the neck.
- In 2014, a Russian tourist was nearly killed by a needlefish off Nha Trang in Vietnam. The fish bit her neck and left pieces of its teeth inside her spinal cord, paralyzing her.
- In early January 2016, a 39-year-old Indonesian woman from Palu, Central Sulawesi, was seriously injured when a half-metre-long needlefish jumped and pierced her just above the right eye. She was swimming in water 80 cm deep in Tanjung Karang Beach, a popular recreational spot in the Donggala Regency, Central Sulawesi. She died a few hours later despite efforts to save her at a local hospital. Shortly after, pictures of her injury spread through instant-messaging applications, while several local news websites also reported the incident, some erroneously attributing the attack to a marlin.
- In December 2018, a needlefish struck the neck of a Thai Navy special forces cadet, causing his death.
- In October 2023, a needlefish impacted the left eye of a swimmer off the eastern coast of Panama. Needlefish beak fragments pierced the optic nerve and permanently blinded the eye.
- In April 2024, a 59-year old fisherman off the coast of Iloilo, Panay Island, Philippines, was pierced in the stomach by a needlefish (locally known as balo) jumping out of the water. He was rushed to a nearby hospital but was declared dead on arrival due to hemorrhage.
- In October 2024, an Italian surfer died in Indonesia after being impaled in her upper left chest by a needlefish.

== In the aquarium ==
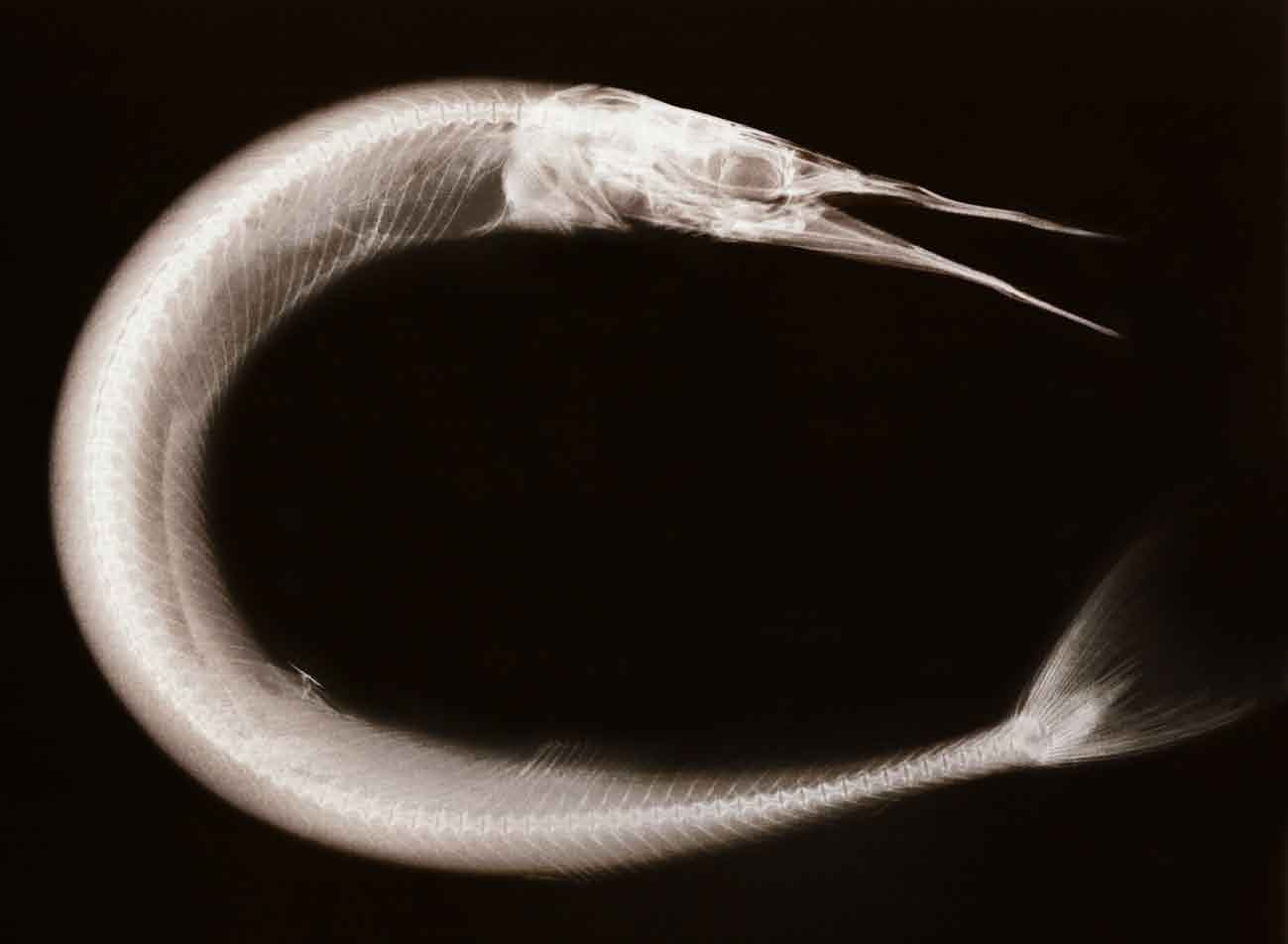
X-ray of a needlefish

Some species of needlefish inhabit brackish and freshwater environments, and one of the freshwater species, Xenentodon cancila from Southeast Asia, is occasionally kept as an aquarium fish. It is a relatively small species, no more than 40 cm in length when fully grown, but is considered to be a rather delicate fish best suited to advanced aquarists.

== Taxonomy ==
The needlefish family is classified within the order Beloniformes and along with the sauries of the family Scomberesocidae they make up the superfamily Scomberesocoidea and in turn, is one of two superfamilies in the suborder Exocoetoidei which comprises all of the Beloniformes except for the ricefishes of the family Adrianichthydae. Workers have concluded that the genus Belone is the sister group to the sauries and that if this is correct them the Belonidae is only monophyletic if the sauries are included within it.
