= Exocoetus peruvianus =

Conservation status
- Data Deficient (IUCN 3.1)

Scientific classification
- Kingdom: Animalia
- Phylum: Chordata
- Class: Actinopterygii
- Order: Beloniformes
- Family: Exocoetidae
- Genus: Exocoetus
- Species: E. peruvianus

Binomial name
- Exocoetus peruvianus Parin & Shakhovskoy, 2000

Species of fish

Exocoetus peruvianus, commonly known as the Peruvian flyingfish, is a species of ray-finned fish endemic to the tropical southeast Pacific Ocean in the waters off Peru and Ecuador.

== Description ==
The species can reach a length of 152 mm (6 in) to 198 mm (7.8 in). Like most flying fish, E. peruivanus exhibits countershading with the body colored iridescent blue from above and silvery white from below. The pectoral fin is light brown while the dorsal fin is light gray. The caudal fin is also gray and both the anal fin and ventral fins are non-pigmented. The species has very few teeth if any and are rarely spaced when present. The osteological character of E. peruivanus is very similar to that of Exocoetus obtusirostris. However, in this species, the posterolateral process of cleithrum head reaches far past the scapular orifice.

Juveniles are typically 34 mm (1.3 in) to 78 mm (3 in) and humpbacked. They have a steep upper profile with the antedorsal distance being larger than antennal distance. At 16 mm (0.6 in) to 34 mm (1.3 in), juveniles have dark transverse bands on the trunk and the posterior part of their pectoral and dorsal fins are dark. At this length and smaller, the pectoral fins are largely transparent with light gray pigmentation in the anterior and posterior parts. The ventral fins are dark on juveniles smaller than 57 mm (2.2 in). Juveniles greater than 57 mm in length are covered with pigment with the exception of the posterior and lower edges. No chin barbels are present in juveniles.

== Distribution and habitat ==
Excoetus peruivanus has the most limited distributional range among Exocoetus. It is only found in a small area of the southeastern Pacific Ocean between the Southern Tropic and the equator.
