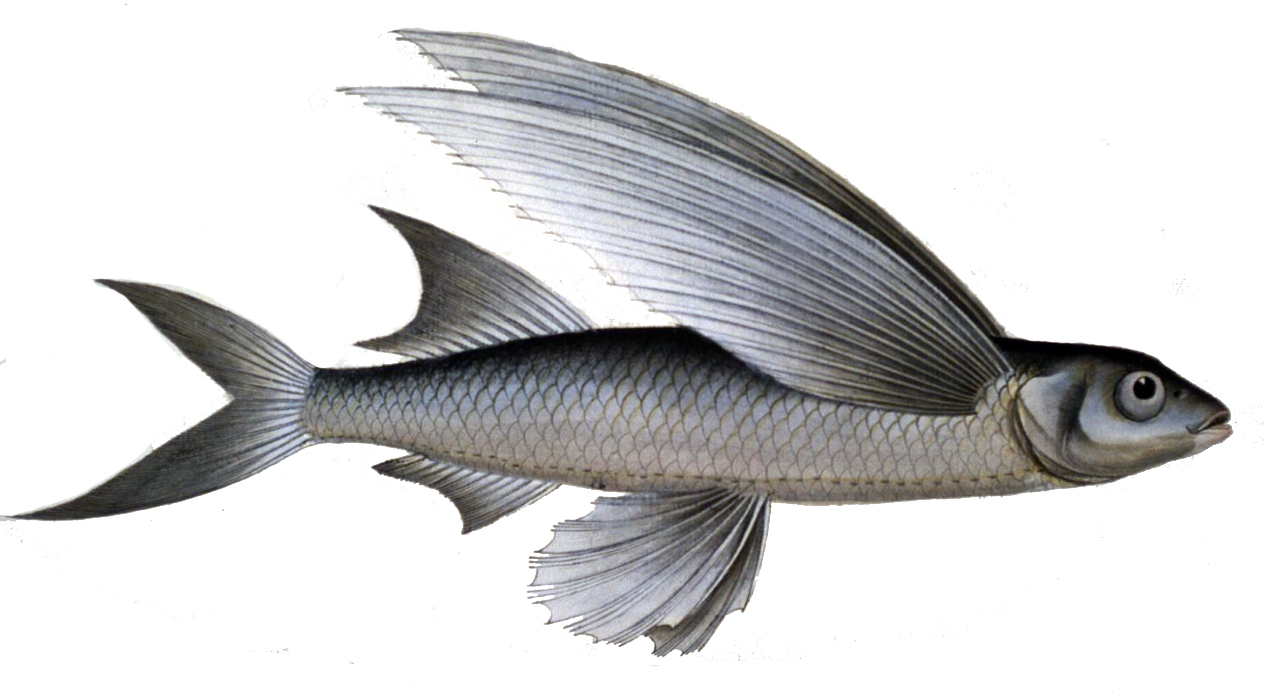

Conservation status
- Least Concern (IUCN 3.1)

Scientific classification
- Kingdom: Animalia
- Phylum: Chordata
- Class: Actinopterygii
- Order: Beloniformes
- Family: Exocoetidae
- Genus: Parexocoetus
- Species: P. hillianus

Binomial name
- Parexocoetus hillianus (Gosse, 1851)

= Parexocoetus hillianus =

Species of fish

Parexocoetus hillianus is a species of flying fish from the genus Parexocoetus. It is found in the western Atlantic in the waters of the Gulf Stream off the southeastern United States and Bermuda south through the Gulf of Mexico and the Caribbean Sea to northern Brazil. In the eastern Atlantic a separate population, which may be a subspecies, is found from Guinea-Bissau south to Angola.
