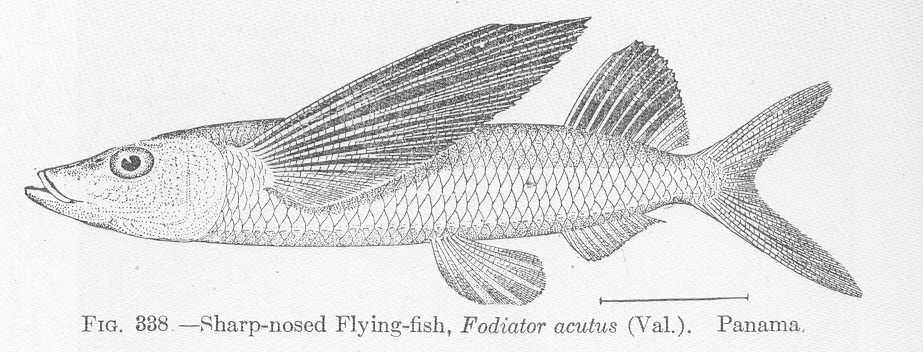

Conservation status
- Least Concern (IUCN 3.1)

Scientific classification
- Kingdom: Animalia
- Phylum: Chordata
- Class: Actinopterygii
- Order: Beloniformes
- Family: Exocoetidae
- Genus: Fodiator
- Species: F. acutus

Binomial name
- Fodiator acutus (Valenciennes, 1847)

Synonyms
- Exocoetus acutus Valenciennes, 1847

= Fodiator acutus =

Species of flying fish

Fodiator acutus, the sharpchin flyingfish, is a species of flying fish in the genus Fodiator endemic to the northeast Pacific Ocean and the eastern Atlantic Ocean.
