= Exocoetus gibbosus =

Scientific classification
- Kingdom: Animalia
- Phylum: Chordata
- Class: Actinopterygii
- Order: Beloniformes
- Family: Exocoetidae
- Genus: Exocoetus
- Species: E. gibbosus

Binomial name
- Exocoetus gibbosus Parin & Shakhovskoy, 2000

Species of Actinopterygii

Exocoetus gibbosus is a species of fish in the family Exocoetidae.
