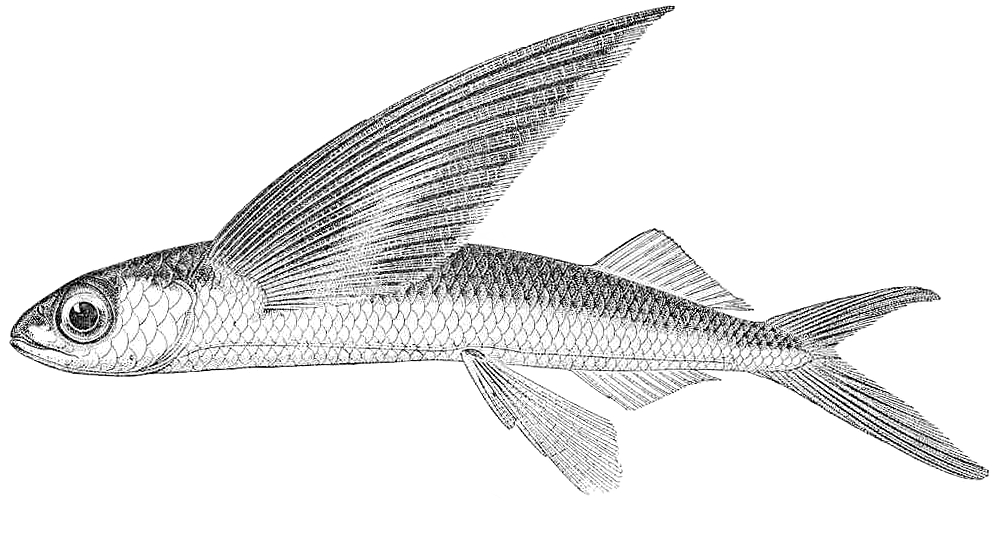

Conservation status
- Least Concern (IUCN 3.1)

Scientific classification
- Kingdom: Animalia
- Phylum: Chordata
- Class: Actinopterygii
- Order: Beloniformes
- Family: Exocoetidae
- Genus: Hirundichthys
- Species: H. speculiger

Binomial name
- Hirundichthys speculiger Valenciennes, 1847

Synonyms
- Cypselurus hyperistius Fowler, 1919; Cypselurus speculiger Valenciennes, 1847; Exocoetus hyperistius Fowler, 1919; Exocoetus nigripennis Valenciennes, 1847; Exocoetus polleni Bleeker, 1866; Exocoetus speculiger Valenciennes, 1847

= Mirrorwing flyingfish =

Species of fish

The mirrorwing flyingfish (Hirundichthys speculiger) is a flying fish of the family Exocoetidae. It was first described by the French zoologist, Achille Valenciennes in a 22-volume work titled Histoire naturelle des poissons (Natural History of Fishes), which was a collaboration with Georges Cuvier.

== Description ==
Mirrorwing flyingfish have 10-12 soft rays on their dorsal fins and 11-13 rays on their anal fins. Their bodies are generally dark, with blue on top and silver-white on bottom. The dorsal and caudal fins are both grayish, while the other fins are hyaline. Juveniles have more elongated bodies and mottled fins. Adults can grow up to 30 cm (1 ft) long, but usually they reach about 24 cm.

== Distribution and habitat ==
Mirrorwing flyingfish are known from warm surface waters worldwide, but are most common in tropical and temperate waters. In the Atlantic Ocean, they are common to the tropical areas in the east and all along the North and South American coasts, but are uncommon in the Gulf of Guinea, Caribbean Sea, and Gulf of Mexico. They are curiously absent from the Benguela Current. In the Indian Ocean, mirrorwing are known from south Africa, Mauritius, Rodrigues, the Maldives, and the Chagos Archipelago. In the Pacific Ocean, they are known from most regions save the seas of southeast Asia. Mirrorwing flyingfish spawn year round in the offshore waters where they normally live attaching their eggs to floating debris in masses. Mirrorwing eggs use a series of filaments to achieve this attachment, the arrangement of which can be used to identify them as mirrorwing eggs.
