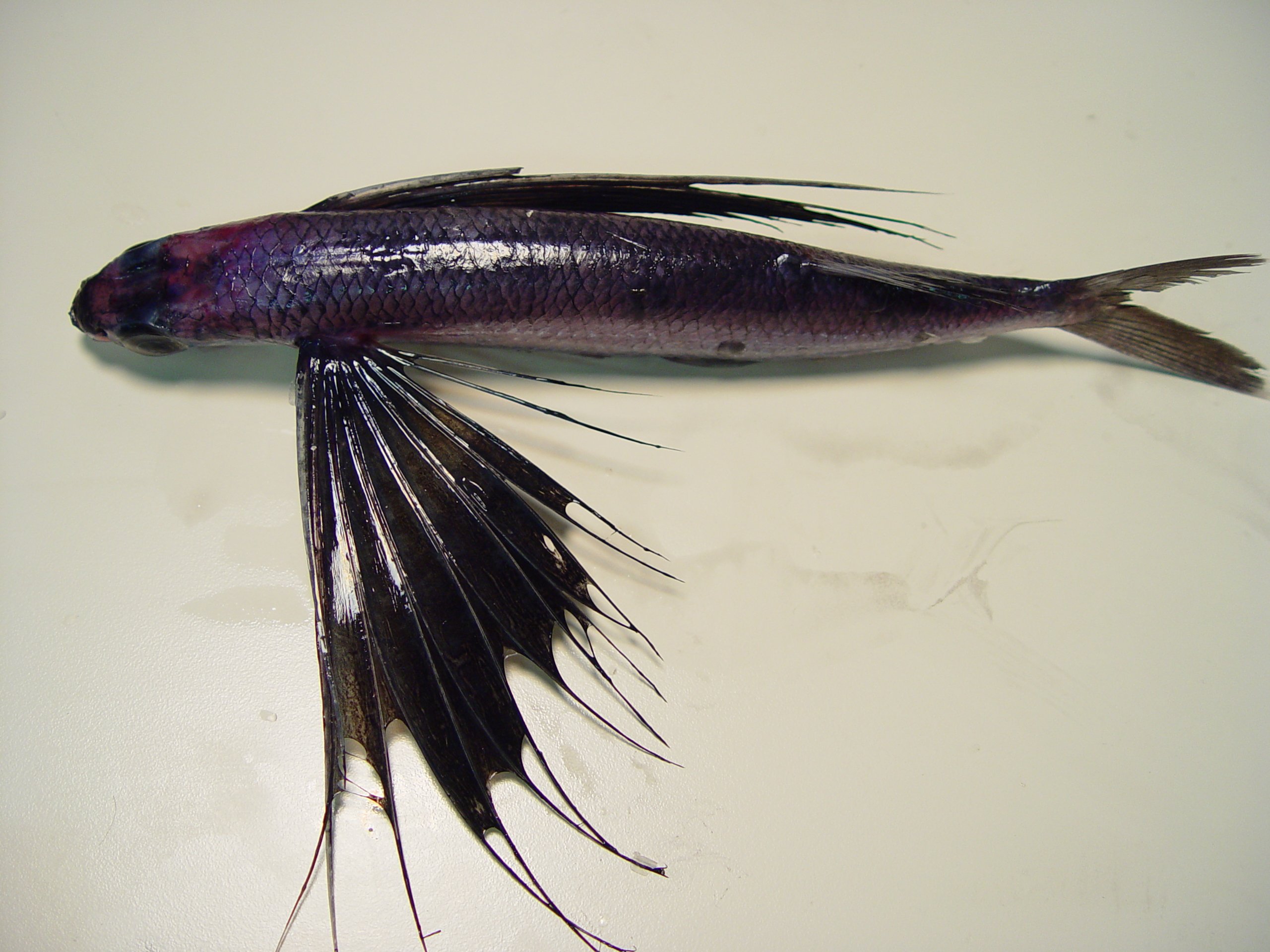

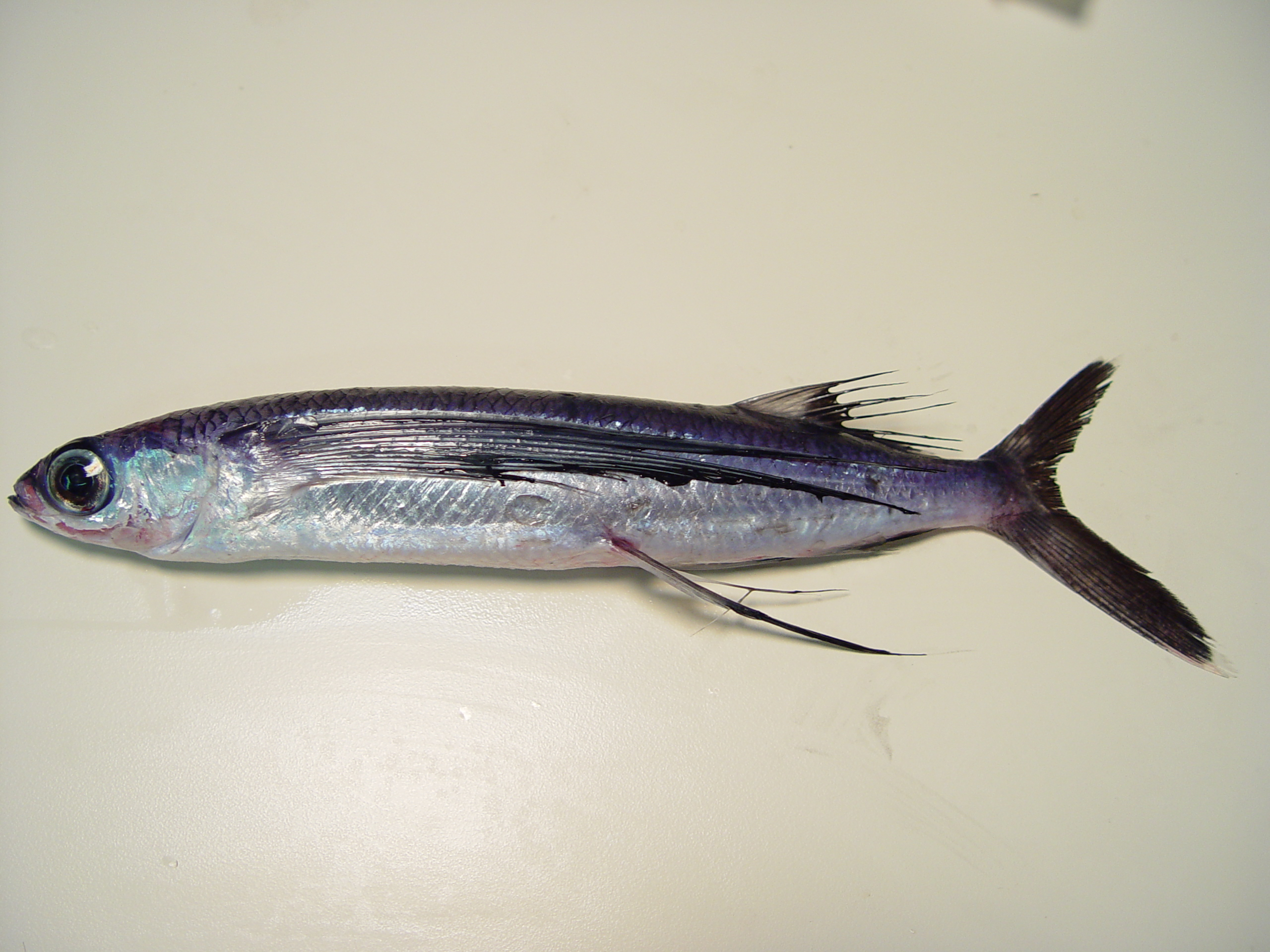

Conservation status
- Least Concern (IUCN 3.1)

Scientific classification
- Kingdom: Animalia
- Phylum: Chordata
- Class: Actinopterygii
- Order: Beloniformes
- Family: Exocoetidae
- Genus: Hirundichthys
- Species: H. rondeletii

Binomial name
- Hirundichthys rondeletii (Valenciennes, 1847)

Synonyms
- Exocoetus rondeletii Valenciennes, 1847; Danichthys rondeletii (Valenciennes, 1847); Prognichthys rondeletii (Valenciennes, 1847); Exocoetus rubescens Rafinesque, 1818; Exocoetus dowii Gill, 1863; Exocoetus brachycephalus Günther, 1866; Exocoetus lamellifer Kner & Steindachner, 1867; Exocoetus cribrosa Kner, 1867; Danichthys cribrosus (Kner, 1867); Exocoetus vinciguerrae Jordan & Meek, 1885; Exonautes gilberti Snyder, 1904; Exonautes fulvipes Ogilby, 1908; Cypselurus polyethmus Fowler, 1919; Exonautes nonsuchae Beebe & Tee-Van, 1932

= Hirundichthys rondeletii =

Species of fish

Hirundichthys rondeletii, the black wing flyingfish, is a species of flying fish from the family Exocoetidae which is found throughout the tropical and subtropical waters of the Atlantic, Pacific and Indian Oceans.

== Description ==
Hirundichthys rondeletii has an elongate body which is almost rectangular in cross-section, being somewhat flattened ventrally. It has a short, blunt snout with a small mouth in which the jaws are nearly equal in length and are equipped with conspicuous teeth but there are no palatine teeth present. It has a low dorsal fin which has 10-12 soft rays while the anal fin has 11 to 13 soft rays and originates just before, or below the first or second dorsal fin rays. The pectoral fins are 1.3 to 1.4 the standard length and contain 17 to 19 soft rays, of which the first 2 rays are unbranched. The pelvic fins are 2.8 to 3.4 of the standard length and are situated closer to the rear margin of gill cover than they are to base of the tail. Their bodies are body dark, iridescent blue dorsally and pale, silvery ventrally. The dorsal and caudal fins are greyish, the anal fin is transparent, the pectoral fins are black with a thin, pale outer margin; pelvic fins normally have a black spot. The barbless juveniles are less than 50 millimetres (2.0 in) standard length and are marked with a few dark vertical bands on the body while the dorsal, pectoral, and pelvic fins are mottled with dark spots and bands.

== Distribution ==
Hirundichthys rondeletii is widely distributed in the tropical and subtropical waters of all of the worlds oceans. In the eastern Atlantic it is a rare vagrant north to Spain and the English Channel but its main range extends from Portugal as far south as Namibia and some times South Africa. It is also found in the western Mediterranean where it migrates south east in the winter. In the western Atlantic it is found as far north as Massachusetts and Bermuda south to the coast southern Brazil, although it has been recorded from Canada. In the eastern Pacific the distribution of this species extends from California south to Chile.

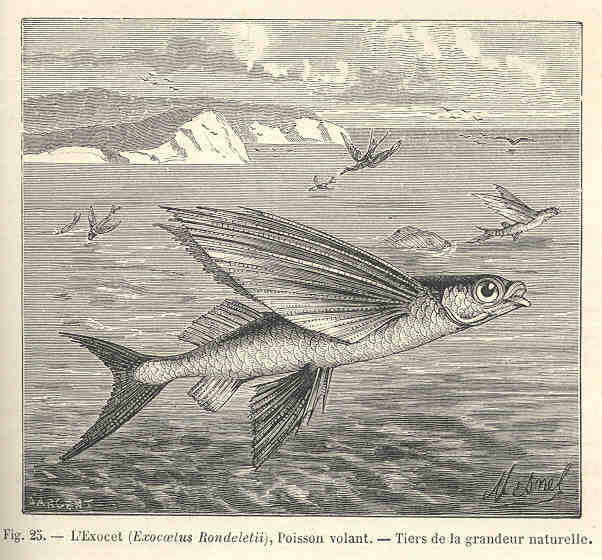
Exocet (Exocaelus rondeletii), Poisson volant

== Habitat and biology ==
Hirundichthys rondeletii is a pelagic, oceanodromous species which inhabits the surface waters. It is able to leap out of the water and glide for considerable distances over the surface. Its diet consist of zooplankton. The eggs have a bunch of filaments at one pole with a single filament at the opposite pole. This species is considered to be on no importance in fisheries.

== Taxonomy and naming ==
Hirundichthys rondeletii is the type species of the genus Hirundichthys, although there is some uncertainty about the exact identity of Exocoetus rubescens, the species Charles Marcus Breder Jr. designated as the type species of the genus in 1928. This species was originally described as Exocoetus rondeletii in 1847 by the French ichthyologist Achille Valenciennes in the book he cowrote with George Cuvier entitled Histoire naturelle des poissons, the type locality was given as Naples. The specific name honours the French physician and naturalist Guillaume Rondelet (1507–1566) who appears to have illustrated this species in his work Libri de piscibus marinis published in 1554–55.
