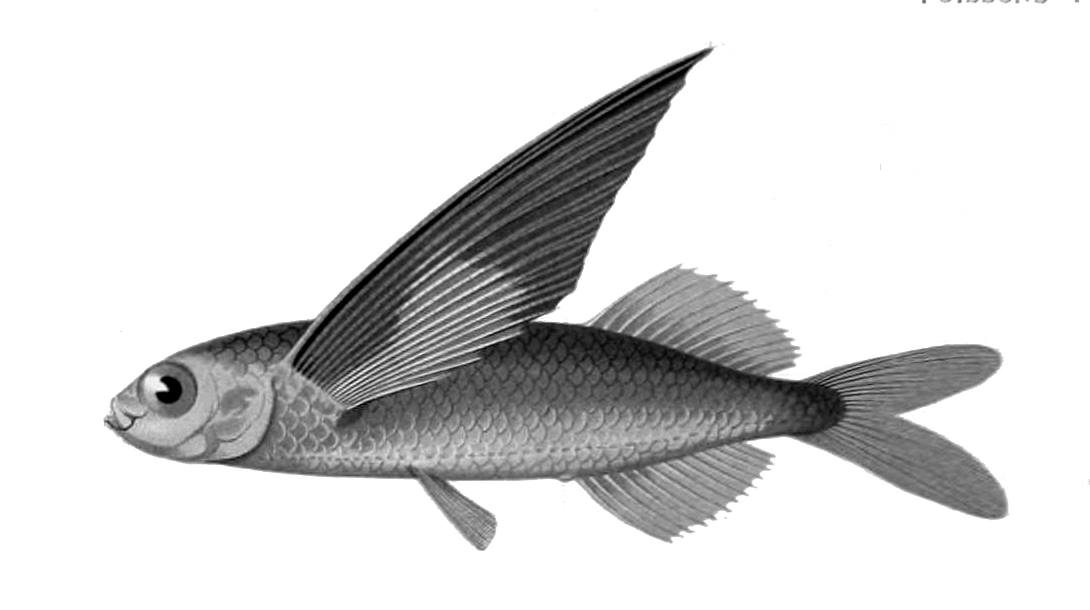
- Oceanic two-wing flying fish (E. obtusirostris)

Scientific classification
- Kingdom: Animalia
- Phylum: Chordata
- Class: Actinopterygii
- Division: Teleostei
- Order: Beloniformes
- Superfamily: Exocoetoidea
- Family: Exocoetidae
- Subfamily: Exocoetinae; Risso, 1827
- Genus: Exocoetus; Linnaeus, 1758

Type species
- Exocoetus volitans Linnaeus, 1758

= Exocoetus =

Two-winged flying fish

Genus of fishes

Exocoetus is a genus of flying fishes. It is a bony fish. The body is covered with cycloid scales. The mouth is wide, and the jaws bear teeth. It is a marine fish. The tail has hypobatic fins as the ventral lobe.

== Species ==
Five species in this genus are recognized:

- Exocoetus gibbosus Parin & Shakhovskoy, 2000 (oceanic flyingfish)
- Exocoetus monocirrhus J. Richardson, 1846 (barbel flyingfish)
- Exocoetus obtusirostris Günther, 1866 (oceanic two-wing flyingfish)
- Exocoetus peruvianus Parin & Shakhovskoy, 2000 (Peruvian flyingfish)
- Exocoetus volitans Linnaeus, 1758 (tropical two-wing flyingfish)
