= Fodiator rostratus =

Conservation status
- Least Concern (IUCN 3.1)

Scientific classification
- Kingdom: Animalia
- Phylum: Chordata
- Class: Actinopterygii
- Order: Beloniformes
- Family: Exocoetidae
- Genus: Fodiator
- Species: F. rostratus

Binomial name
- Fodiator rostratus (Günther, 1866)

Synonyms
- Exocoetus rostratus Günther, 1866; Hemiexocoetus caudimaculatus Fowler, 1901

Species of fish

Map of the distribution of Fodiator species, with F. rostratus shown in blue.

Fodiator rostratus is a species of flying fish in the genus Fodiator. It reaches a maximum length of 19 cm (7.4 in) and is endemic to the eastern Pacific Ocean from Baja California in the Gulf of California to Peru, including Clipperton Island and the Galapagos Islands.
