= Exocoetus monocirrhus =

Scientific classification
- Domain: Eukaryota
- Kingdom: Animalia
- Phylum: Chordata
- Class: Actinopterygii
- Order: Beloniformes
- Family: Exocoetidae
- Genus: Exocoetus
- Species: E. monocirrhus

Binomial name
- Exocoetus monocirrhus Richardson, 1846

Species of Actinopterygii

Exocoetus monocirrhus is a species of fish in the family Exocoetidae.

Exocoetus monocirrhus mainly inhabit the warm waters of the Indian and Pacific Oceans. The species is found at a Sea Surface Temperature of 22-30°C.
