= Fourwing flyingfish =

Conservation status
- Least Concern (IUCN 3.1)

Scientific classification
- Kingdom: Animalia
- Phylum: Chordata
- Class: Actinopterygii
- Division: Teleostei
- Order: Beloniformes
- Family: Exocoetidae
- Genus: Hirundichthys
- Species: H. affinis

Binomial name
- Hirundichthys affinis (Günther, 1866)

Synonyms
- Exocoetus affinis Günther, 1866; Exonautes affinis (Günther, 1866); Hirundichtys affinis (Günther, 1866); Hyrundichtys affinis (Günther, 1866); Exocoetus roberti Müller & Troschel, 1848

Species of ray-finned fish

The fourwing flyingfish (Hirundichthys affinis) is a species of marine ray-finned fish in the family Exocoetidae. It is found in warm waters of the Atlantic Ocean and is an important commercial and bait fish across much of the Caribbean, where it is heavily fished, most notably off Barbados.

== Description ==
Hirundichthys affinis has an elongated, broadly cylindrical body with a short, blunt snout and small jaws of roughly equal length. Its pectoral and pelvic fins are both notably elongated, extending back at least to the middle of the dorsal and anal fins; it is this four-fin arrangement of enlarged, wing-like pectoral and pelvic fins that gives the species its common name. The pectoral fins are mostly dark grey with a pale triangular crossband, and the tail is deeply forked with a much longer lower lobe. The dorsal fin is low, with 10–12 rays, while the anal fin has 11–13 rays; the species lacks fin spines. It reaches a maximum total length of around 33 cm (13 in), with individuals more commonly recorded around 24 cm (9.4 in), and a maximum reported age of about one year. It can be distinguished from the similar blackwing flyingfish (Hirundichthys rondeletii) by its pale, rather than uniformly dark, pectoral fin crossband.

== Distribution and habitat ==
The species occurs in the eastern and western Atlantic Ocean. In the eastern Atlantic it ranges along the West African coast from Guinea to Angola, while in the western Atlantic it is found from the Gulf Stream off Virginia and the northern Gulf of Mexico south through the Caribbean Sea to northern Brazil, with occasional records as far north as Canada. It is a pelagic, neritic species that lives in surface waters within about 0–100 m of the ocean surface, both near the coast and further offshore. It is abundant in the Caribbean Sea and Gulf of Mexico, though it is not commercially exploited throughout that entire range.

== Biology and ecology ==
Hirundichthys affinis is a oceanodromous, schooling migratory fish with a lifespan of roughly one year. Like other flyingfishes, it is capable of leaping from the water and gliding for considerable distances using its enlarged fins to escape underwater predators such as dolphinfish, tuna and marlin. Adults feed mainly at night on planktonic invertebrates, small fish, crustaceans and zooplankton, and are readily attracted to light, a behaviour exploited by fishers who use lamps to draw schools toward their boats.

Off Barbados, the species shows strong seasonal variation in abundance, being common between December and June and comparatively scarce from July to November. Spawning takes place in open water over weak currents and occurs throughout the main fishing season, peaking between March and June, with fish capable of spawning more than once in a season. Immature fish are present in Barbadian waters at low abundance between July and November, before recruiting into the fishery the following season.

== Relationship to humans ==
Hirundichthys affinis is the dominant species landed in the long-established flyingfish fisheries of the eastern Caribbean, and is fished both for direct human consumption and as bait for other pelagic fisheries, such as those for dolphinfish and tuna. It is particularly associated with Barbados, sometimes nicknamed the "land of the flying fish," where flyingfish are a staple catch and appear, together with cou-cou, in the national dish. Flyingfish stocks in the region are shared between several island nations and have historically been managed through regional cooperation, including between Barbados and Tobago.

The species is assessed as Least Concern on the IUCN Red List, reflecting its wide range and the absence of evidence for major population declines.
