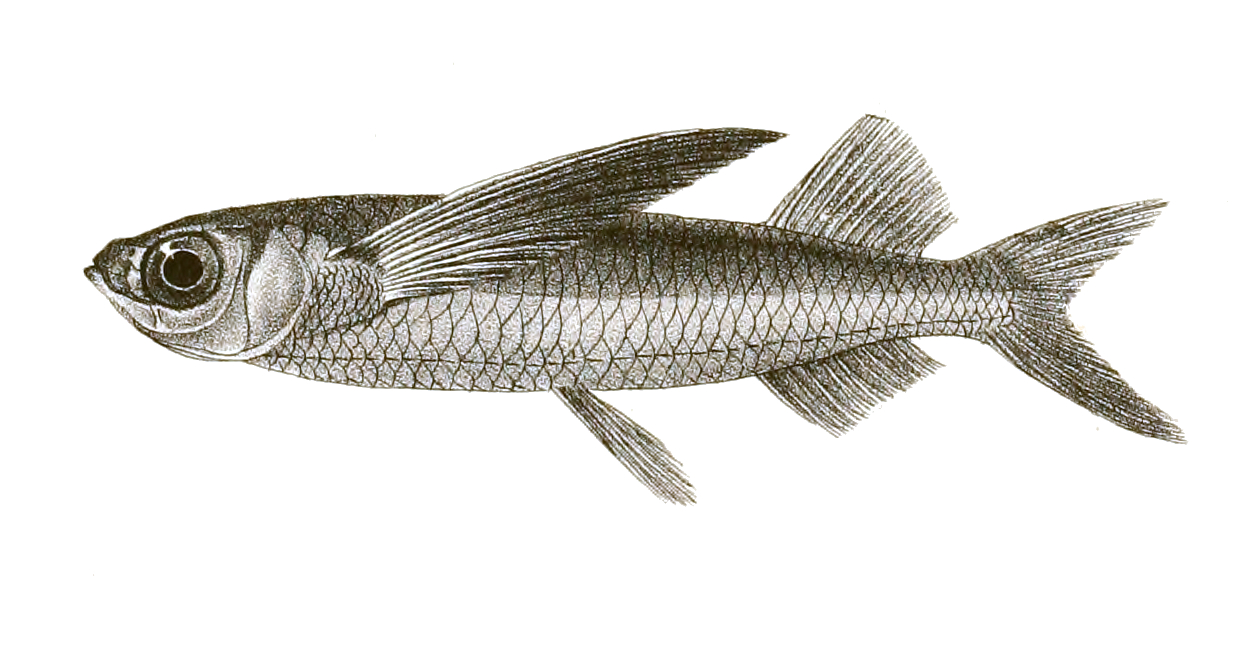

Scientific classification
- Kingdom: Animalia
- Phylum: Chordata
- Class: Actinopterygii
- Order: Beloniformes
- Family: Exocoetidae
- Genus: Parexocoetus
- Species: P. mento

Binomial name
- Parexocoetus mento (Valenciennes, 1847)

Synonyms
- Exocoetus mento Valenciennes, 1847; Exocoetus mesogaster Bloch, 1795; Exocoetus gryllus Klunzinger, 1871

= Parexocoetus mento =

Species of fish

Parexocoetus mento; also known as the African sailfin flying fish, Cuvier's flying fish, the yellow belly flying fish or the short-winged flying fish; is a species of flying fish from the family Exocoetidae which is found in the Indo-pacific region and which has colonised the eastern Mediterranean.

== Description ==
Parexocoetus mento has an elongate body which is compressed and rounded ventrally. The lateral line has a pectoral branch. It has a protrusible upper jaw. The long pectoral fins reach the anal fin when folded but do not extend beyond it while the medium-sized pelvic fins do not extend far beyond the origin of the anal fin and are situated closer to it than they are to the pectoral fins. They are iridescent greenish-blue above and silvery below while the dorsal fin has a lot of black in it and the pectoral fins are greyish. It grows to a length of around to 10 centimetres (3.9 in).

== Distribution ==
Parexocoetus mento is found from the coast of East Africa and the Red Sea to Fiji, extending south to Queensland and the Mozambique Channel and north to southern Japan. This species is recorded in the Mediterranean Sea since 1935, a likely entry via the Suez Canal. It is now prevalent in the eastern Basin.

== Habitat and biology ==
Parexocoetus mento is found in coastal waters close to the surface and it is rarely recorded in open sea. These fishes can jump out of the water and glide over the water. The eggs are covered in filaments and juveniles do not have any barbels.

== Taxonomy ==
Parexocoetus mento is the type species of the genus Parexocoetus which was erected by Pieter Bleeker in 1865, this species was originally described as Exocoetus mento by Achille Valenciennes in 1847 with the type locality given as Puducherry, India. Records of this species, as the subspecies atlanticus are erroneous.
