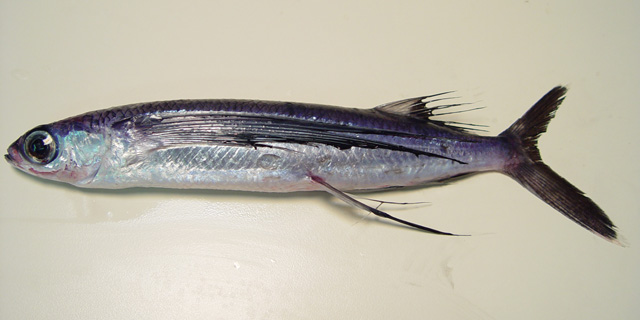
- Blackwing flyingfish (H. rondeletii)

Scientific classification
- Kingdom: Animalia
- Phylum: Chordata
- Class: Actinopterygii
- Division: Teleostei
- Order: Beloniformes
- Family: Exocoetidae
- Subfamily: Cypsellurinae
- Genus: Hirundichthys; Breder, 1928

Type species
- Exocoetus rubescens, a synonym of Hirundichthys rondeletii Rafinesque, 1818

= Hirundichthys =

Genus of fishes

Hirundichthys is a genus of flying fish. They have elongated, moderately thick, ventrally flattened bodies. The pectoral branch of the lateral line is absent. The upper jaw is not protrusible. The dorsal fin has fewer or equal (rarely one more) rays than the anal fin; the dorsal fin is low, with the anterior rays the longest, the pectoral fins are strikingly long, reaching to or almost to caudal fin base; pelvic fins are long, reaching beyond the anal fin origin, and their insertion is closer to the anal fin origin than to the pectoral fin insertion.

== Species ==
Twelve species in this genus are recognized:

- Hirundichthys affinis (Günther, 1866) (fourwing flyingfish)
- Hirundichthys albimaculatus (Fowler, 1934) (whitespot flyingfish)
- Hirundichthys coromandelensis (Hornell, 1923) (Coromandel flyingfish)
- Hirundichthys ilma (F. E. Clarke, 1899)
- Hirundichthys indicus Shakhovskoy & Parin, 2013
  - Hirundichthys indicus indicus Shakhovskoy & Parin, 2013
  - Hirundichthys indicus orientalis Shakhovskoy & Parin, 2013
- Hirundichthys marginatus (Nichols & Breder, 1928) (banded flyingfish)
- Hirundichthys oxycephalus (Bleeker, 1853)
  - Hirundichthys oxycephalus frereensis Shakhovskoy & Parin, 2013
  - Hirundichthys oxycephalus oxycephalus (Bleeker, 1853) (bony flyingfish)
- Hirundichthys rufipinnis (Valenciennes, 1847) (Redfin flyingfish)
- Hirundichthys rondeletii (Valenciennes, 1847) (blackwing flyingfish)
- Hirundichthys socotranus (Steindachner, 1902)
- Hirundichthys speculiger (Valenciennes, 1847) (mirrorwing flyingfish)
- Hirundichthys volador (Jordan, 1884)
