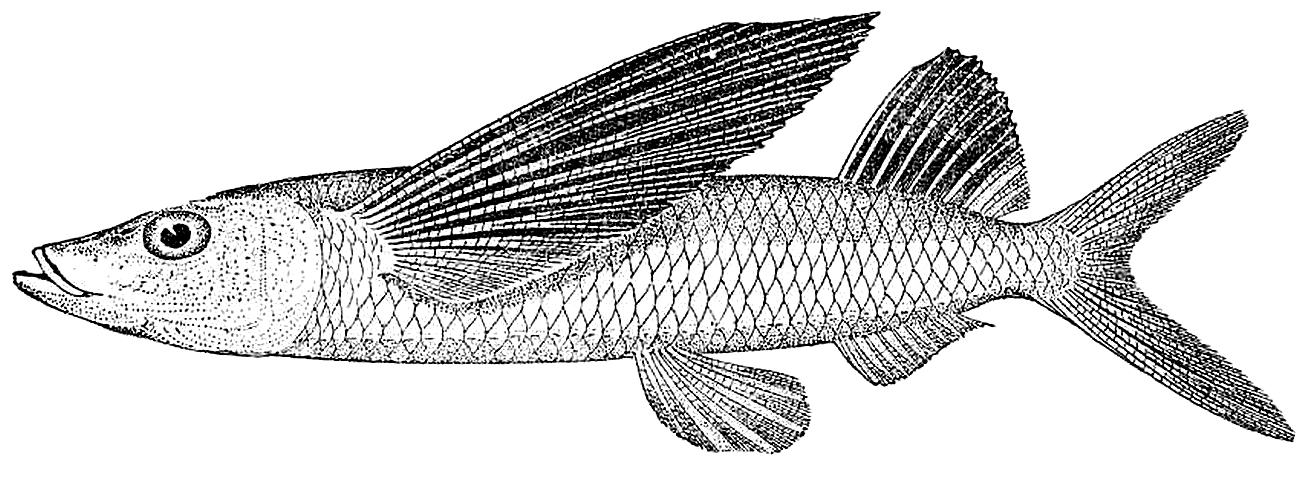
- Fodiator acutus

Scientific classification
- Kingdom: Animalia
- Phylum: Chordata
- Class: Actinopterygii
- Order: Beloniformes
- Family: Exocoetidae
- Subfamily: Fodiatorinae; Fowler, 1925
- Genus: Fodiator; D. S. Jordan & Meek, 1885

Type species
- Exocoetus acutus Valenciennes, 1847

Synonyms
- Hemiexocoetus Fowler, 1901

= Fodiator =

Genus of fishes

Fodiator is a genus of flying fishes. It is the only genus in the subfamily Fodiatorinae.

== Etymology ==
Fodiator means "one who stabs," likely a reference to the long, thin, sharp snout with its projecting lower jaw.

== About ==
Fodiator species live in marine climates, reaching a maximum length of 19 cm. They can most easily be found in Baja California, Mexico, the Gulf of California to Peru, and the Clipperton and Galapagos Islands. They have the ability to leap out of the water and glide in the air for long distances, and often rise to the surface when the water becomes warm.

To reproduce, these fish attach their eggs to small floating objects. Two species are found in the Pacific Ocean, with one also being found in the eastern Atlantic.

== Species ==
Two species in this genus are recognized:

- Fodiator acutus (Valenciennes, 1847) (sharpchin flyingfish)
- Fodiator rostratus (Günther, 1866)
