= Prognichthys =

Scientific classification
- Kingdom: Animalia
- Phylum: Chordata
- Class: Actinopterygii
- Order: Beloniformes
- Family: Exocoetidae
- Subfamily: Cypsellurinae
- Genus: Prognichthys; Breder, 1928

Type species
- Exocoetus gibbifrons Valenciennes, 1847

Genus of fishes

Prognichthys is a genus of flying fishes. They are Widespread in tropical oceans.

== Species ==
Six recognized species are in this genus:

- Prognichthys brevipinnis (Valenciennes, 1847) (shortfin flyingfish)
- Prognichthys gibbifrons (Valenciennes, 1847) (bluntnose flyingfish)
- Prognichthys glaphyrae Parin, 1999 (Gyre flyingfish)
- Prognichthys occidentalis Parin, 1999
- Prognichthys sealei T. Abe, 1955 (sailor flyingfish)
- Prognichthys tringa Breder, 1928 (Tringa flyingfish)
