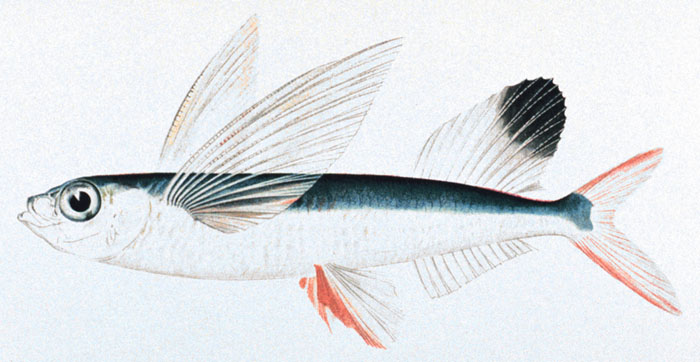

Scientific classification
- Kingdom: Animalia
- Phylum: Chordata
- Class: Actinopterygii
- Order: Beloniformes
- Family: Exocoetidae
- Genus: Parexocoetus
- Species: P. brachypterus

Binomial name
- Parexocoetus brachypterus (Richardson, 1846)

Synonyms
- Exocoetus brachypterus Richardson, 1846; Exocoetus atrodorsalis Günther, 1867; Ptenonotus melanogeneion Pietschmann, 1928

= Sailfin flying fish =

Species of fish

The sailfin flying fish (Parexocoetus brachypterus) is a member of the flyingfish family Exocoetidae. As is typical of other members of its family, this species has the ability to jump out of the water and glide on hypertrophied fins in order to evade predators. It is considered a “two-winged” flying fish, meaning that it only has enlarged pectoral fins, as opposed to “four-winged” flying fish, which have both enlarged pectoral and pelvic fins.

== Description ==
The sailfin flying fish is stocky as far as flying fish are concerned. It has comparatively small pectoral fins and a long dorsal fin relative to other flying fish. One distinguishing feature is its blunt snout. It displays countershading. One average, P. brachypterus measure 110-130 mm in length. Females of the species are usually slightly longer and heavier than the males.

== Distribution and habitat ==
This species is dispersed globally in coastal and sub-coastal waters. It is found in the Atlantic, Pacific, and Indian Oceans. In the Western Atlantic Ocean, it can be found off the shores of northern Florida to Brazil, as well as in the Gulf of Mexico and the Caribbean Sea.

== Behavior ==
When spawning sailfin flying fish aggregate in large numbers, with groups estimated to contain up to one million members in some cases. The individuals in such aggregations display high-energy jumping, gliding and swimming. Groups contain an unequal sex ratio, with males being approximately three times more abundant than females. Small groups usually containing 3-4 fish have been observed during spawning events. Such groups are thought to consist of one female being pursued by several males; these observations are consistent with the sex rations observed in the group as a whole. There are two spawning periods during the year, one from September to January, and one from March to August. Unlike other species of flying fish, it is unsure whether or not fertilized eggs need to attach themselves to flotsam. There are reports that this species’ eggs may be free-floating.

== Ecology ==
Like most other flying fish, the sailfin flying fish feeds primarily on zooplankton. It has also been found to eat fish scales and Sargassum, and is thought to be a generalist. It plays an important ecological role as a prey species for larger predators. Some organisms known to predate on the sailfin flying fish are large fish, dolphinfish in particular, large squids, and seabirds. The sailfin flying fish is the only known host to the buccal attaching parasite Glossobius parexocoetii, an isopod in the family Cymothoidae. P. brachypterus has also been seen hosting various other species of parasites.

== Importance to humans ==
P. brachypterus is generally considered bycatch by the commercial fishing industry. However, like other flying fishes, they can be prepared as salted fish by salting them and leaving them to dry out in the sun.

In Taiwan, the sailfin flying fish and other flying fish are eaten by locals and are also used as bait. Flying fish eggs are also exported to Japan. To the Tao people, an indigenous ethnic group in Taiwan, P. brachypterus is one of the species of flying fish that comprise the bulk of their traditional fishing stock. Important Tao festivals coincide with the arrival and departure of flying fish from local waters. Between 2006-2007, there was a 60% decrease in the numbers of flying fish taken from Taiwanese fisheries, leading to concern from the indigenous people about the long-term viability of the flying fish stock.

As an important prey item of dolphinfish, the sailfin flying fish and other species of flying fish play an important ecological role in maintaining dolphinfish fisheries.

Because of high populations in the eastern Caribbean, some scientists have suggested investigating the feasibility of commercial P. brachypterus fishing in the region.
