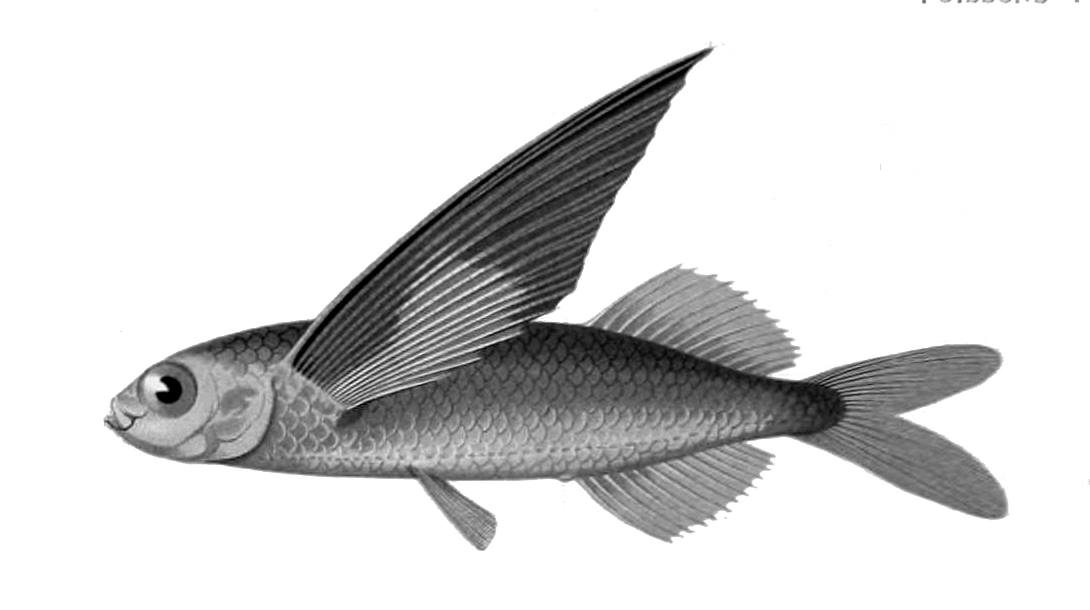

Conservation status
- Least Concern (IUCN 3.1)

Scientific classification
- Kingdom: Animalia
- Phylum: Chordata
- Class: Actinopterygii
- Order: Beloniformes
- Family: Exocoetidae
- Genus: Exocoetus
- Species: E. obtusirostris

Binomial name
- Exocoetus obtusirostris Günther, 1866

Synonyms
- Exocoetus gaussianus Lampe, 1914; Exocoetus holubii Steindachner, 1881

= Exocoetus obtusirostris =

Species of fish

Exocoetus obtusirostris, commonly known as the oceanic two-wing flyingfish or the blunt-snouted flyingfish, is a species of ray-finned fish native to the tropical and subtropical western Atlantic Ocean. It has the ability to glide above the surface of the water to escape from predators.

== Description ==
The species can reach a length of 25 cm (10 in). It is similar in appearance to the tropical two-wing flyingfish (Exocoetus volitans) which shares much of its range, but differs in certain characteristics; the head is quite blunt, the forehead sloping steeply down in front of the eyes; the pectoral fins extend as far as the base of the caudal fin; the origin of the anal fin is slightly in front of the origin of the dorsal fin, and the dorsal fin is colourless. Both these two-winged species have very small pelvic fins, whereas other so called four-winged species of flyingfish have pelvic fins that extend at least as far as the origin of the anal fin. Like all flying-fishes, E. obtusirostris exhibits countershading, being darkish blue dorsally and white ventrally.

== Distribution and habitat ==
At one time E. obtusirostris was considered to be a circum-global species, but the similar populations of different oceans were later split into three separate species. As now understood, it is endemic to tropical and subtropical parts of the Atlantic Ocean. In the western Atlantic its range includes the Caribbean Sea and the Gulf of Mexico and in the eastern Atlantic it extends from Namibia to Madeira, the Azores and possibly the westernmost Mediterranean Sea. It occurs in surface waters, both near the coast and in the open ocean, at depths down to about 20 m (66 ft).

== Ecology ==
The diet of E. obtusirostris consists of small planktonic invertebrates, mostly copepods and chaetognaths. It is consumed by various predatory fish and by squids, dolphins and seabirds. Fish become mature when they are about 15 cm (6 in) in length. The female produces a number of bundles of eggs over a period of around five days, producing an average of 10,000 eggs. All fish will die soon after breeding.

== Status ==
Exocoetus obtusirostris is not the subject of a fishery and no particular threats to it are known. It is common in the Gulf of Mexico but its conservation status in the eastern Atlantic Ocean and the Mediterranean Sea are less well known. The International Union for Conservation of Nature has listed its status as being of "least concern".
