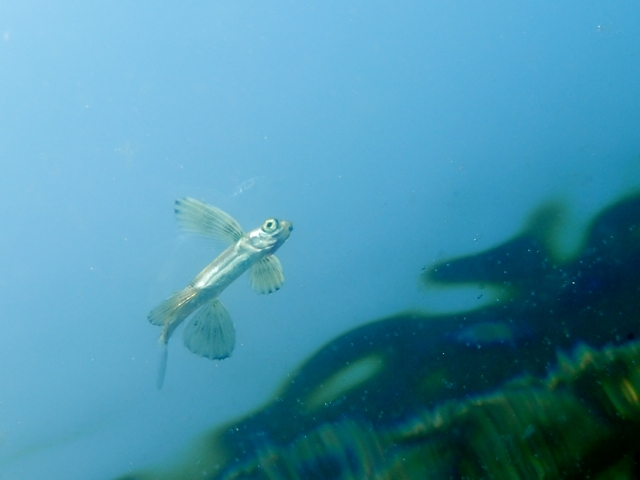
- Cypselurus sp.

Scientific classification
- Kingdom: Animalia
- Phylum: Chordata
- Class: Actinopterygii
- Order: Beloniformes
- Family: Exocoetidae
- Subfamily: Cypsellurinae; Hubbs, 1933

= Cypsellurinae =

Subfamily of fishes

Cypsellurinae is a subfamily of flying fishes, one of four in the family Exocoetidae and the only one which is not monogeneric.

== Genera ==
The following four genera make of the subfamily:

- Cheilopogon Lowe, 1841
- Cypselurus Swainson, 1838
- Hirundichthys Breder, 1928
- Prognichthys Breder, 1928
