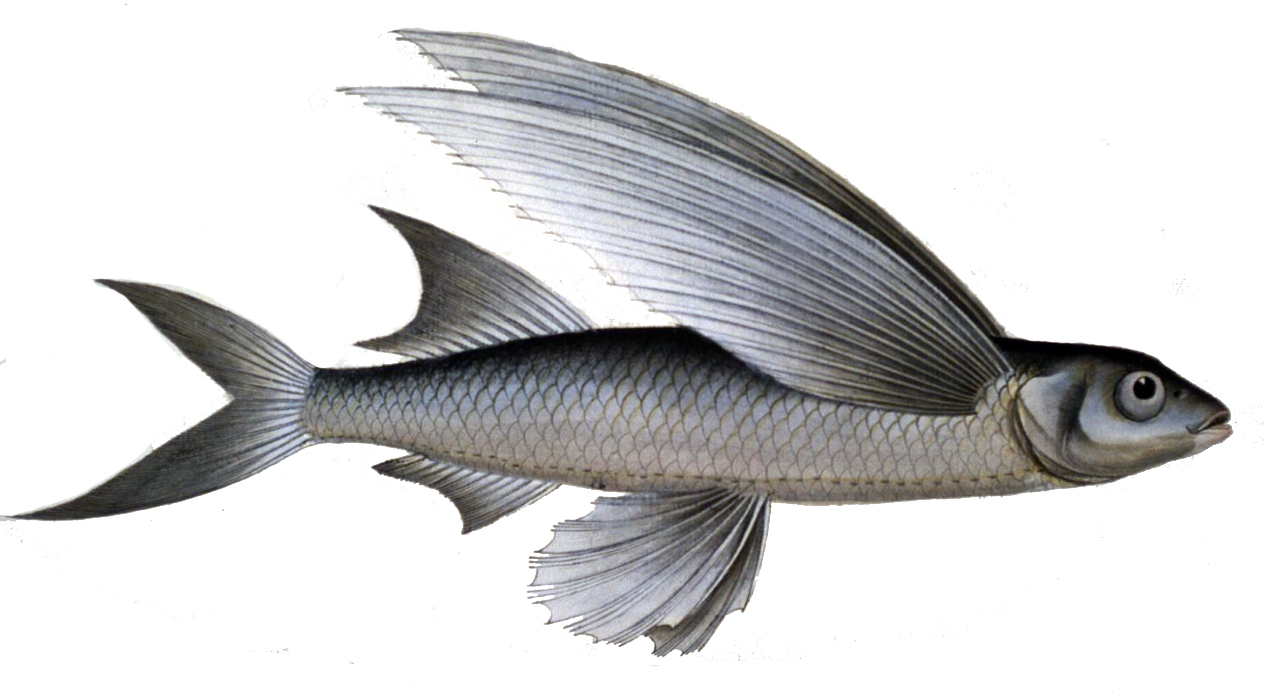
- P. hillianus

Scientific classification
- Kingdom: Animalia
- Phylum: Chordata
- Class: Actinopterygii
- Order: Beloniformes
- Family: Exocoetidae
- Subfamily: Parexocoetinae; Bruun, 1935
- Genus: Parexocoetus; Bleeker, 1865

Type species
- Exocoetus mento Valenciennes, 1847

= Parexocoetus =

Genus of fishes

Parexocoetus is a genus of flying fishes. They are found in the tropical and subtropical western Atlantic and Indo-Pacific Oceans. It is the only genus in the subfamily Parexocoetinae which is unique among the flying fishes in having a jaw which is very protrusible and having a joint situated between the cranium and the shoulder girdle which allows the head to be more maneuverable than in other lineages of this family.

== Species ==
Three recognized species are in this genus:

- Parexocoetus brachypterus (J. Richardson, 1846) (sailfin flyingfish)
- Parexocoetus hillianus (P. H. Gosse, 1851)
- Parexocoetus mento (Valenciennes, 1847) (African sailfin flyingfish)
