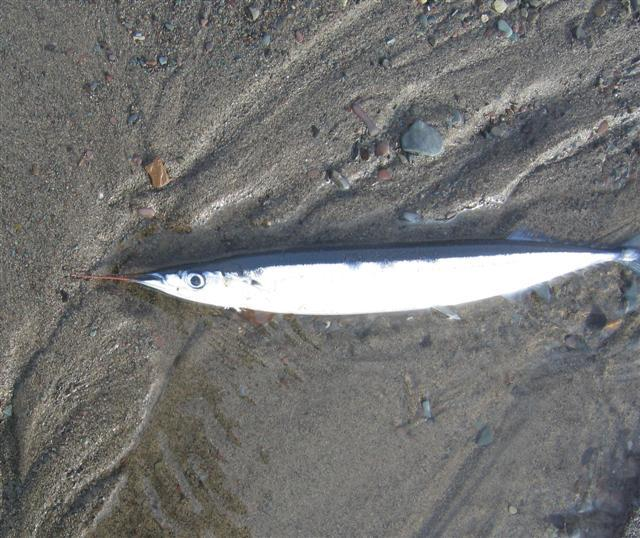
- Scomberesox saurus

Scientific classification
- Kingdom: Animalia
- Phylum: Chordata
- Class: Actinopterygii
- Order: Beloniformes
- Suborder: Exocoetoidei
- Superfamily: Scomberesocoidea; Bleeker, 1859

Families
- See text

= Scomberesocoidea =

Superfamily of fishes

Scomberesocoidea is a superfamily within the suborder Exocoetoidei of the order Beloniformes. It consists of two families which are commonly known as the needlefishes and the sauries.

== Classification ==
The two families within the suborder Scomberesocoidea are:

- Family Belonidae Bonaparte, 1835 (Needlefishes)
- Family Scomberesocidae Bleeker 1859 (Sauries)
