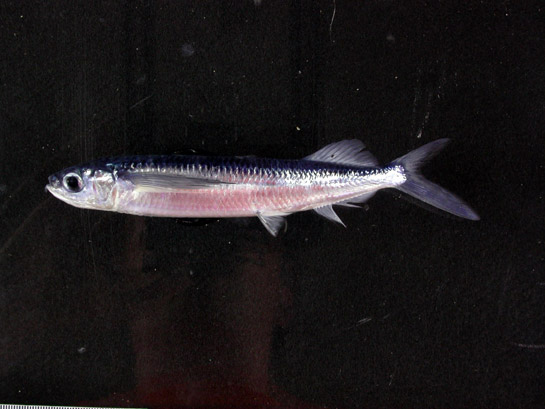
- Oxyporhamphus micropterus

Scientific classification
- Kingdom: Animalia
- Phylum: Chordata
- Class: Actinopterygii
- Order: Beloniformes
- Suborder: Exocoetoidei

Superfamilies
- see text

Synonyms
- Belonoidei

= Exocoetoidei =

Suborder of fishes

Exocoetoidei is a suborder of the order Beloniformes, which is sometimes known as the Belonoidei. It contains two superfamilies and five families.

== Classification ==
Exocoetoidei is classified as follows:

- Suborder Exocoetoidei
  - Superfamily Scomberesocoidea Bleeker, 1859
    - Family Belonidae Bonaparte, 1835 (Needlefishes)
    - Family Scomberesocidae Bleeker 1859 (Sauries)
  - Superfamily Exocoetoidea
    - Family Exocoetidae Risso, 1827 (Flying fishes)
    - Family Hemiramphidae Gill, 1859 (Halfbeaks)
    - Family Zenarchopteridae Fowler, 1934 (Freshwater halfbeaks)
