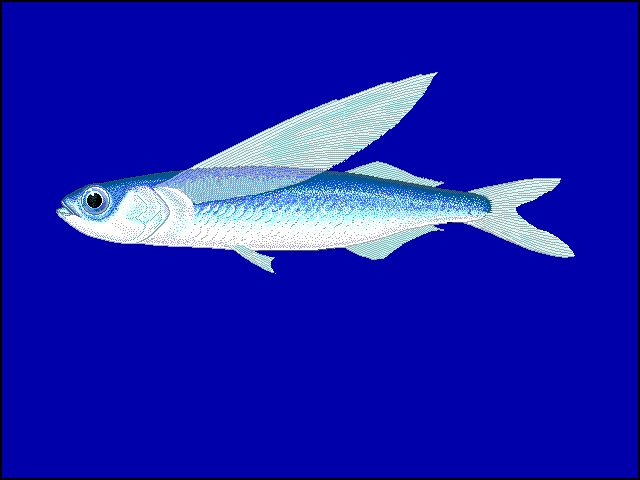

Conservation status
- Least Concern (IUCN 3.1)

Scientific classification
- Kingdom: Animalia
- Phylum: Chordata
- Class: Actinopterygii
- Division: Teleostei
- Order: Beloniformes
- Family: Exocoetidae
- Genus: Exocoetus
- Species: E. volitans

Binomial name
- Exocoetus volitans Linnaeus, 1758

Synonyms
- Exocoetus commersonnii Lacepède, 1803; Exocoetus evolans Linnaeus, 1766; Exocoetus volans Solander, 1846; Halocypselus evolans (Linnaeus, 1766); Halocypselus mesogaster Weinland, 1858

= Exocoetus volitans =

Species of fish

Exocoetus volitans, commonly known as the tropical two-wing flyingfish or blue flyingfish, is a species of ray-finned fish native to tropical and subtropical seas. It can glide above the surface of the sea to escape predators.

== Description ==
The maximum length for this fish is about 30 cm (12 in) but a more common length is 20 cm (8 in). The dorsal fin has no spines and 12 to 15 soft rays while the anal fin has no spines and 12 to 14 soft rays. The exceptionally large pectoral fins enable this fish to glide for long distances above the surface of the water. The upper parts of the body are an iridescent dark blue colour while the belly is silvery white. The pectoral fins and tail fin are greyish while the other fins are colourless. Juvenile fish are sometimes barred with black. This species can be distinguished from the oceanic two-wing flyingfish (Exocoetus obtusirostris) by having a less blunt snout and by the origin of the anal fin being at a location behind the origin of the dorsal fin.

== Distribution and habitat ==
Exocoetus volitans is present in the tropical and subtropical zones of all the world's oceans. Its range includes the Caribbean Sea and the western part of the Mediterranean Sea, but it is absent from the Gulf of Mexico and largely absent from the inland southeastern Asian seas such as the Celebes Sea, the Sulu Sea and the Flores Sea. It is found in surface waters both in the open ocean and close to the coast.

== Ecology ==
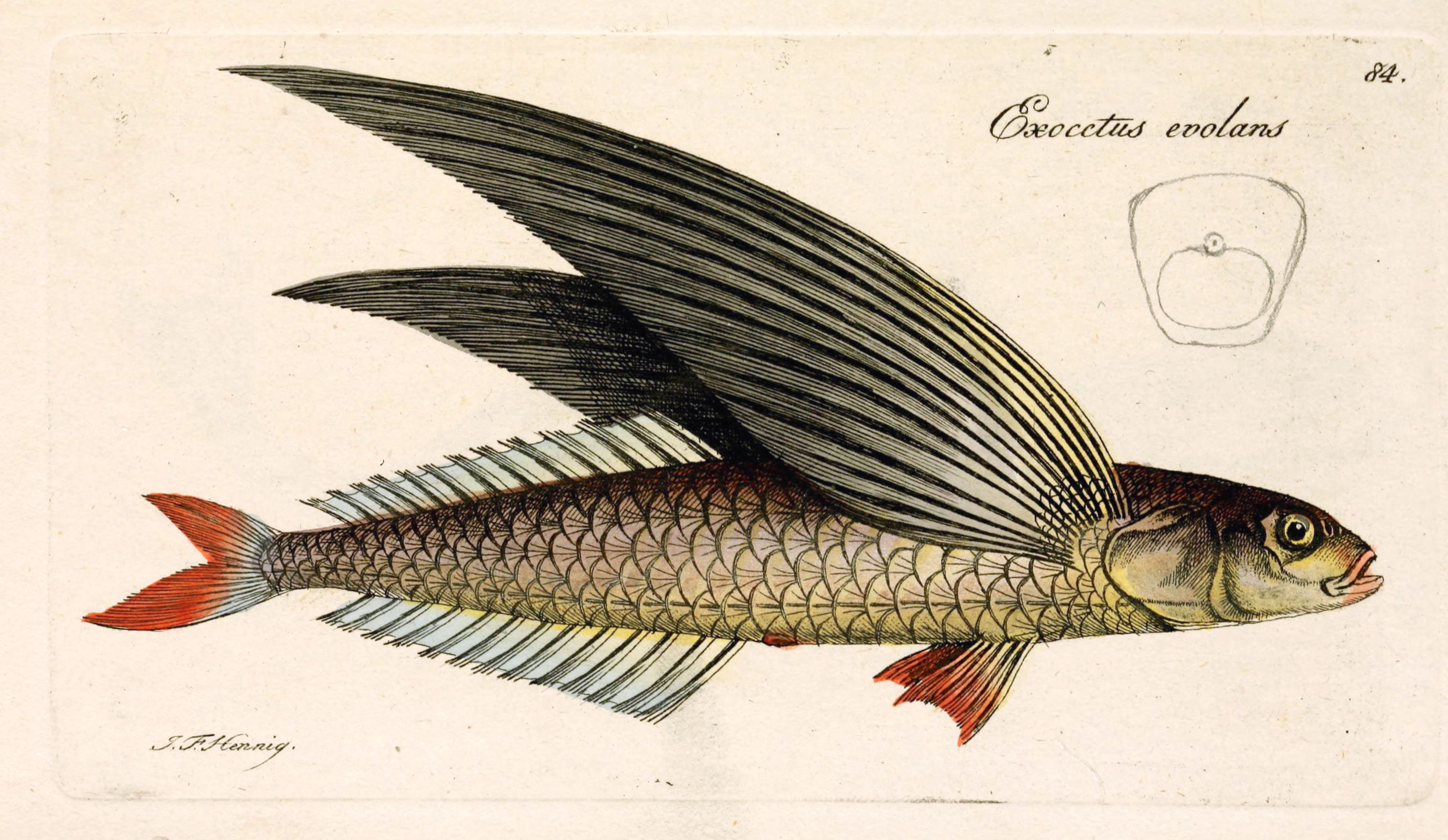
Illustration by Marcus Elieser Bloch

E. volitans feeds in the open sea on crustaceans, such as copepods, and other planktonic fauna. The female lays her clutches of 300 or 400 eggs in the open water. This fish sometimes launches itself into the air in an attempt to escape from predators such as tuna, dolphinfishes (Coryphaena), snake mackerel (Gempylus serpens) and the rainbow runner (Elagatis bipinnulata). However, in so doing, it exposes itself to a different set of predators in the form of gulls, cormorants and other aquatic birds. It often exits the water in shoals and sometimes lands on the decks of boats. E. volitans have a high level of genetic similarity caused by a high rate of gene flow and a high level of population expansion, recently.

== Status ==
This flyingfish is abundant in the tropical and subtropical parts of all oceans. It is not fished commercially, and no particular threats have been identified, so the International Union for Conservation of Nature has assessed its conservation status as being of "least concern".
