= Rhamphexocoetus =

Rhamphexocoetus Temporal range: Lutetian

Scientific classification
- Kingdom: Animalia
- Phylum: Chordata
- Class: Actinopterygii
- Order: Beloniformes
- Genus: †Rhamphexocoetus; Bannikov et al., 1985
- Species: †R. volans

Binomial name
- †Rhamphexocoetus volans Bannikov et al., 1985

Extinct genus of fishes

Rhamphexocoetus volans is an extinct bony fish that lived during the Lutetian epoch of Monte Bolca. It combines features of both halfbeaks (i.e., its elongated lower jaw), and flying fishes (i.e., its elongated pectoral fins).

== See also ==
- Prehistoric fish
- List of prehistoric bony fish
