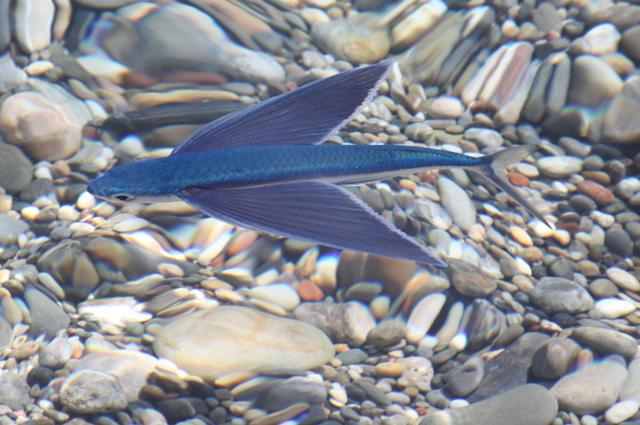
- Exocoetus volitans

Scientific classification
- Kingdom: Animalia
- Phylum: Chordata
- Class: Actinopterygii
- Order: Beloniformes
- Suborder: Exocoetoidei
- Superfamily: Exocoetoidea

= Exocoetoidea =

Superfamily of fishes

Exocoetoidea is a superfamily of fishes that comprises three families, the flying fishes, the halfbeaks and the viviparous halfbeaks. They are found in tropical and subtropical waters around the world. Exocoetoidea is part of the suborder Exocoetoidei of the order Beloniformes.

== Characteristics ==
The fishes have large scales, with normally 38–60 scales along the lateral line. They have a small mouth and some have an elongated lower jaw (but not an elongated upper jaw). They do not have the isolated finlets between the dorsal fin and anal fin and the caudal fin. The dorsal and anal fins typically have 8–18 rays each but there are as many as 25 in Euleptorhamphus. The third pair of upper pharyngeal bones are united, but not fused, to form a palate.

== Families ==
The three families included in this superfamily are:

- Family Exocoetidae Risso, 1827 (flying fishes)
- Family Hemiramphidae Gill, 1859 (halfbeaks)
- Family Zenarchopteridae Fowler, 1934 (viviparous halfbeaks)
