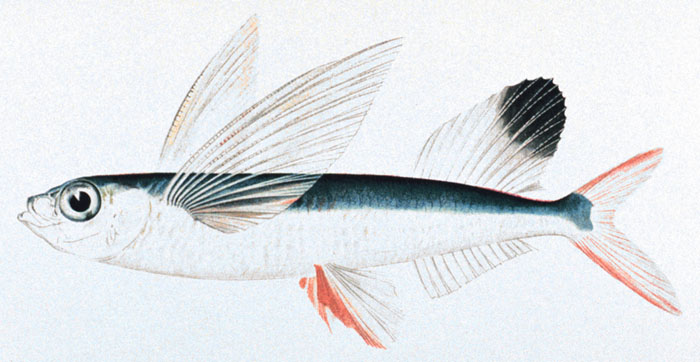
- Sailfin flying-fish, Parexocoetus brachypterus

Scientific classification
- Kingdom: Animalia
- Phylum: Chordata
- Class: Actinopterygii
- Division: Teleostei
- Order: Beloniformes
- Suborder: Exocoetoidei
- Superfamily: Exocoetoidea
- Family: Exocoetidae; Risso, 1827

Genera
- See text

= Flying fish =

Flying fish Temporal range: Early Eocene to present

Family of marine fish that can make powerful, self-propelled leaps out of water

The Exocoetidae are a family of saltwater ray-finned fish in the order Beloniformes, known colloquially as flying fish or flying cod, with about 64 species in seven genera. While they do not "fly" in the same way a bird does, flying fish can make powerful leaps out of the water where their long, wing-like paired fins act as aerofoils to generate lift and enable prolonged gliding for considerable distances above the water surface. The main reason for this behavior is thought to be to escape from underwater predators, which include swordfish, mackerel, tuna, and marlin, among others, though their periods of flight expose them to attack by aerial predators such as frigatebirds.

Barbados is known as "the land of the flying fish" and the fish is one of the national symbols of the country. The French Exocet anti-ship missile is also named after them, as the missile can be launched from underwater, and take a low, sea-skimming trajectory before striking the targets.

== Etymology ==
The term Exocoetidae is both the scientific name and the general name in Latin for a flying fish. The suffix -idae, common for indicating a family, follows the root of the Latin word exocoetus, a transliteration of the Ancient Greek name ἐξώκοιτος. This means literally 'sleeping outside', from ἔξω, 'outside', and κοῖτος, 'bed', 'resting place', with the verb root κει-, 'to lie down', so named as flying fish were believed to leave the water to sleep ashore, or due to flying fish flying and thus stranding themselves in boats.

== Taxonomy ==
The Exocoetidae is divided into four subfamilies and seven genera:

- Subfamily Exocoetinae (Risso, 1827)
  - Genus Exocoetus (Linnaeus, 1758)
- Subfamily Fodiatorinae (Fowler, 1925)
  - Genus Fodiator (D.S. Jordan & Meek, 1885)
- Subfamily Parexocoetinae (Bruun, 1935)
  - Genus Parexocoetus (Bleeker, 1865)
- Subfamily Cypsellurinae (Hubbs, 1933)
  - Genus Cheilopogon (Lowe, 1841)
  - Genus Cypselurus (Swainson, 1838)
  - Genus Hirundichthys (Breder, 1928)
  - Genus Prognichthys (Breder, 1928)

The earliest fossil flyingfish are known from the Early Eocene of Monte Bolca, Italy. They include the genus Rhamphexocoetus Bannikov et al., 1985, which appears to be transitional between halfbeaks and flyingfishes. Also known from the same deposits is "Engraulis" evolans Agassiz, 1835, which was previously thought to be an anchovy, but is now known to represent a juvenile flyingfish.

== Distribution and description ==
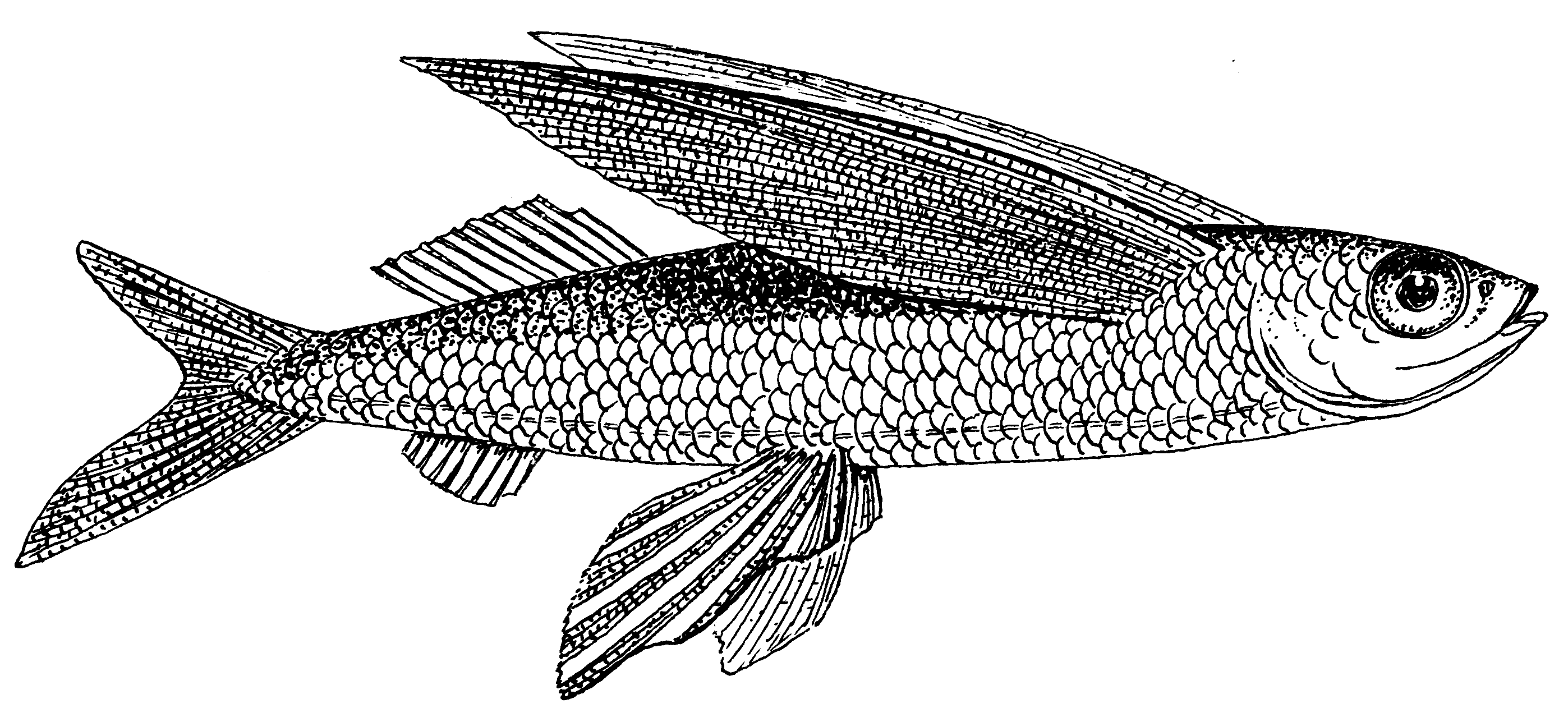
Flying fish

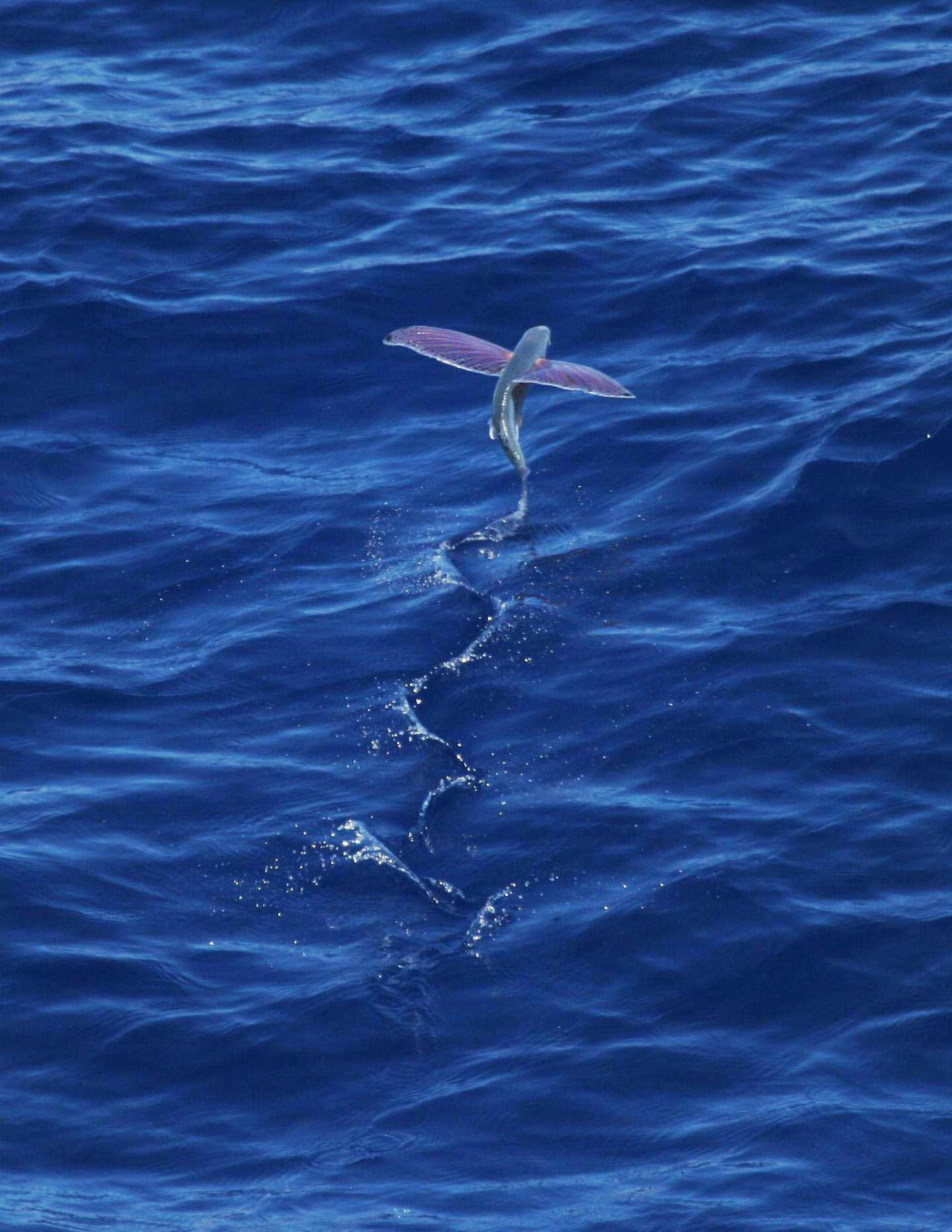
Flying fish taking off

Flying fish live in all of the oceans, particularly in tropical and warm subtropical waters. They are commonly found in the epipelagic zone, the top layer of the ocean to a depth of about 200 m (660 ft).

Numerous morphological features give flying fish the ability to leap above the surface of the ocean. One such feature is fully broadened neural arches, which act as insertion sites for connective tissues and ligaments in a fish's skeleton. Fully broadened neural arches act as more stable and sturdier sites for these connections, creating a strong link between the vertebral column and cranium. A steady glide will improve their flight duration and allow them to be above water. An unsteady glide will not impact their flight as much but will shorten their flight duration not much more than a steady flight. This also will vary based on their energy consumption. This ultimately allows a rigid and sturdy vertebral column (body) that is beneficial in flight. Having a rigid body during glided flight gives the flying fish aerodynamic advantages, increasing its speed and improving its aim. Furthermore, flying fish have developed vertebral columns and ossified caudal complexes. These features provide the majority of strength to the flying fish, allowing them to physically lift their bodies out of water and glide remarkable distances. These additions also reduce the flexibility of the flying fish, allowing them to perform powerful leaps without weakening midair. At the end of a glide, they fold their pectoral fins to re-enter the sea, or drop their tails into the water to push against the water to lift for another glide, possibly changing direction. The curved profile of the "wing" is comparable to the aerodynamic shape of a bird wing. The fish is able to increase its time in the air by flying straight into or at an angle to the direction of updrafts created by a combination of air and ocean currents.

Species of genus Exocoetus have one pair of fins and streamlined bodies to optimize for speed, while Cypselurus spp. have flattened bodies and two pairs of fins, which maximize their time in the air. From 1900 to the 1930s, flying fish were studied as possible models used to develop airplanes.

The Exocoetidae feed mainly on plankton. Predators include dolphins, tuna, marlin, birds, squid, and porpoises.

=== Flight measurements ===
In May 2008, a Japanese television crew (NHK) filmed a flying fish (dubbed "Icarfish") off the coast of Yakushima Island, Japan. The fish spent 45 seconds in flight. The previous record was 42 seconds.

The flights of flying fish are typically around 50 m (160 ft), though they can use updrafts at the leading edge of waves to cover distances up to 400 m (1,300 ft). They can travel at speeds of more than 70 km/h (43 mph). Maximum altitude is 6 m (20 ft) above the surface of the sea. Flying fish often accidentally land on the decks of smaller vessels.

== Fishery and cuisine ==
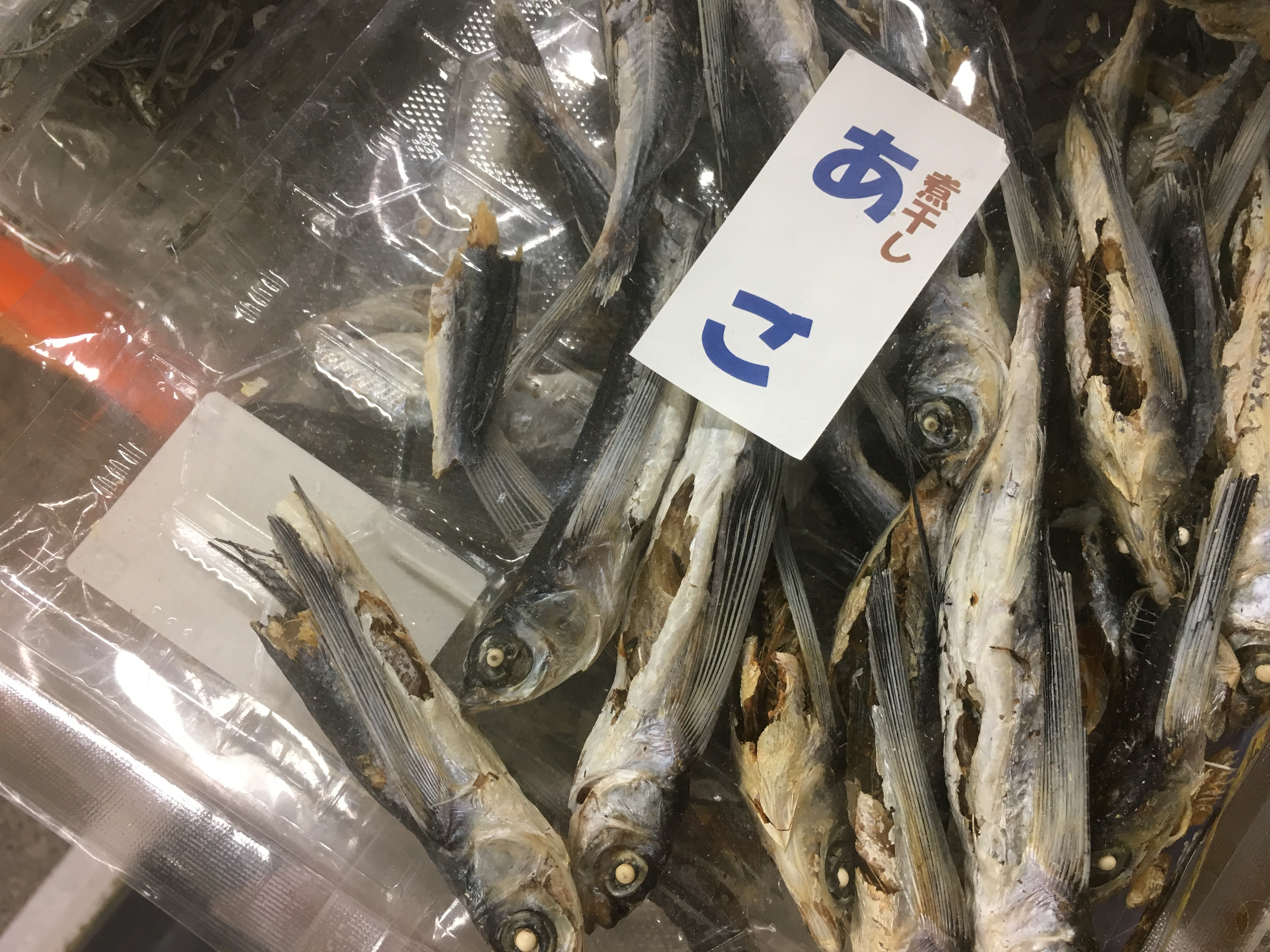
Dried flying fish for sale in Tokyo

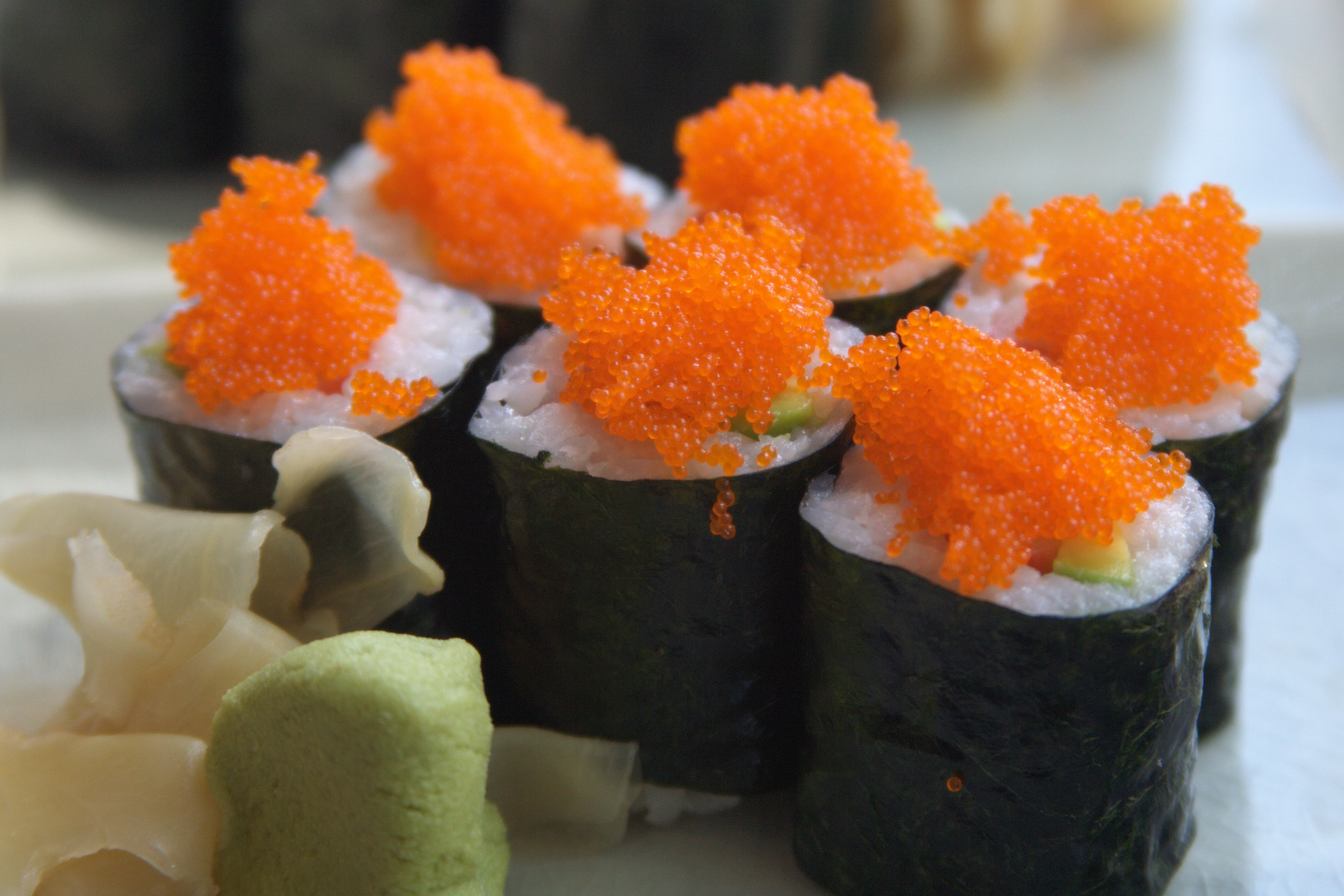
Sushi with tobiko, or flying fish roe

Flying fish are commercially fished for in Japan, Vietnam, and China by gillnetting, and in Indonesia and India by dipnetting. Often in Japanese cuisine, the fish is preserved by drying to be used as fish stock for dashi broth. The roe of Cheilopogon agoo, or Japanese flying fish, is used to make some types of sushi, and is known as tobiko. It is also a staple in the diet of the Tao people of Orchid Island, Taiwan. Flying fish is part of the national dish of Barbados, cou-cou and flying fish. The taste is close to that of a sardine.

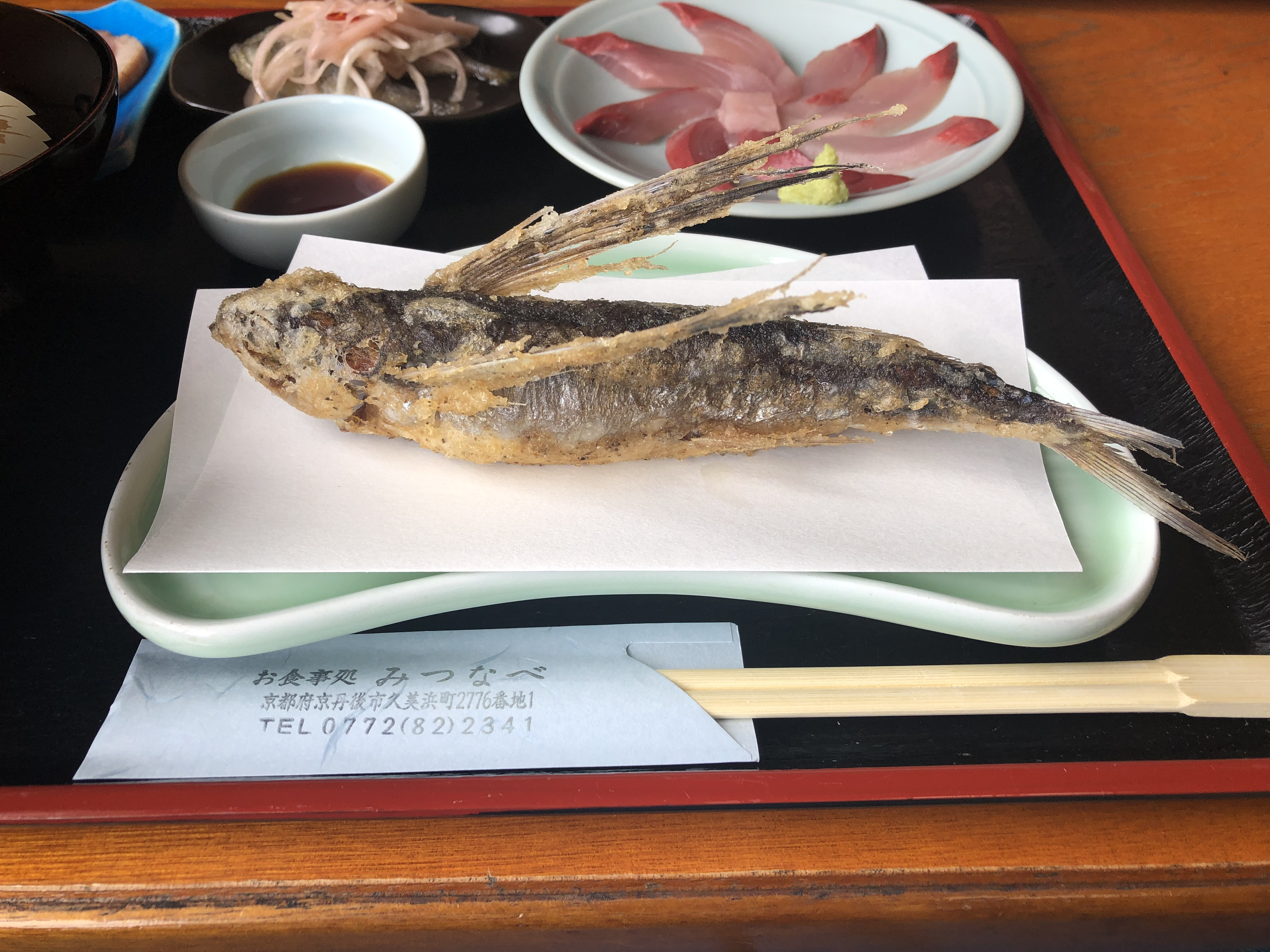
Fried flying fish

Flying fish roe is known as "cau-cau" in southern Peru, and is used to make several local dishes.

In the Solomon Islands, the fish are caught while they are flying, using nets held from outrigger canoes. They are attracted to the light of torches. Fishing is done only when no moonlight is available.

== Importance ==
=== Barbados ===
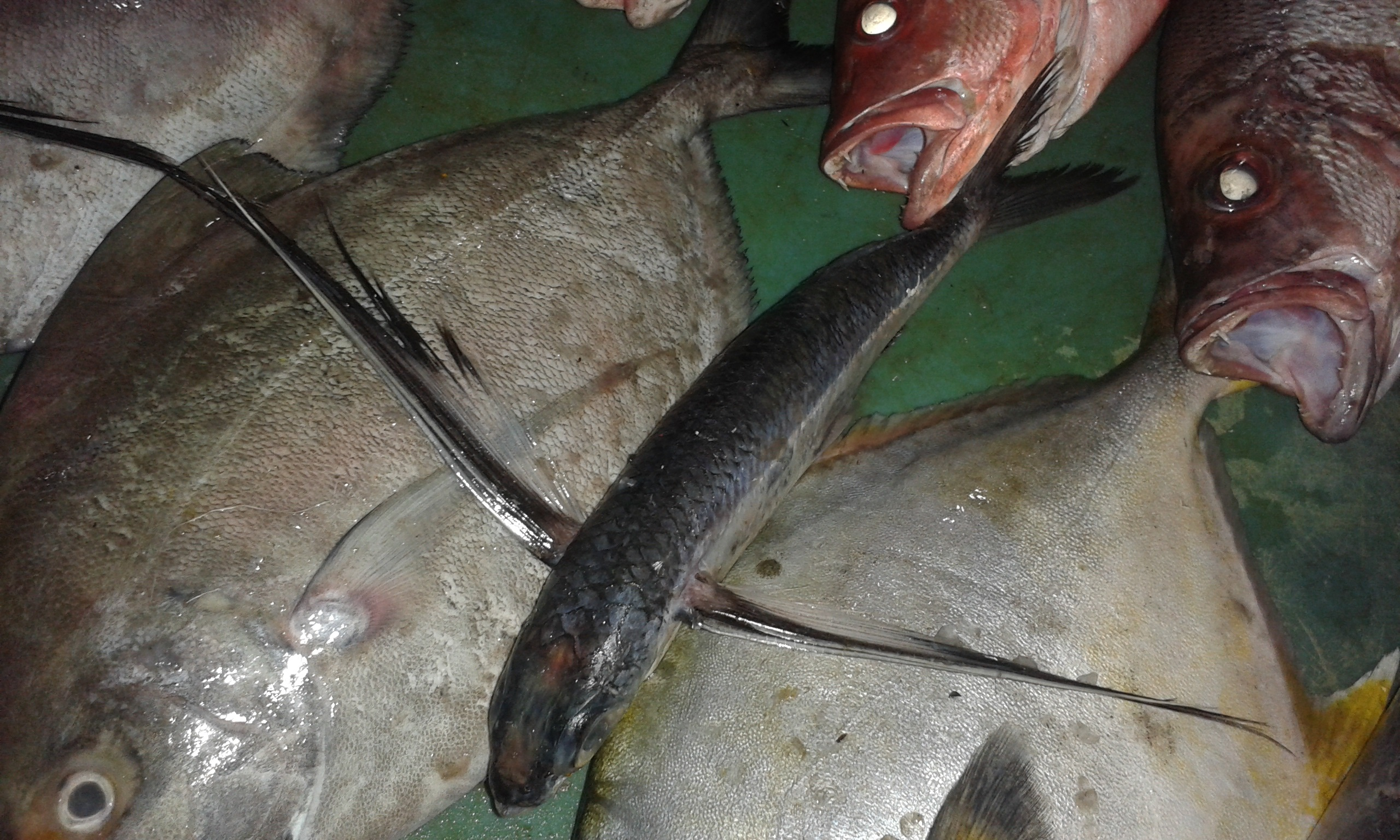
Flying fish for sale in local fish market of Saint Martin's Island, Bangladesh

Barbados is known as "the land of the flying fish", and the fish is one of the national symbols of the country. Once abundant, it migrated between the warm, coral-filled Atlantic Ocean surrounding the island of Barbados and the plankton-rich outflows of the Orinoco River in Venezuela.

Just after the completion of the Bridgetown Harbor / Deep Water Harbor in Bridgetown, Barbados had an increase of ship visits, linking the island to the world. The overall health of the coral reefs surrounding Barbados suffered due to ship-based pollution. Additionally, Barbadian overfishing pushed them closer to the Orinoco delta, no longer returning to Barbados in large numbers. Today, the flying fish only migrate as far north as Tobago, around 120 nmi (220 km; 140 mi) southwest of Barbados. Despite the change, flying fish remain a coveted delicacy.

Many aspects of Barbadian culture center around the flying fish; it is depicted on coins, as sculptures in fountains, in artwork, and as part of the official logo of the Barbados Tourism Authority. Additionally, the Barbadian coat of arms features a pelican and dolphinfish on either side of the shield, but the dolphinfish resembles a flying fish. Furthermore, actual artistic renditions and holograms of the flying fish are also present within the Barbadian passport.

==== Maritime disputes ====
Flying fish have also been gaining in popularity in other islands, fueling several maritime disputes. In 2006, the council of the United Nations Convention on the Law of the Sea fixed the maritime boundaries between Barbados and Trinidad and Tobago over the flying fish dispute, which gradually raised tensions between the neighbours. The ruling stated both countries must preserve stocks for the future. Barbadian fishers still follow the flying fish southward.

=== Indonesia ===
Makassar fishermen in south Sulawesi have been catching flying fish (torani) in special boats called patorani for centuries developing their own sailing traditions along the way. These fishermen were able to sail as far as Kimberley region in west of Australia reaching the indigenous people there. The Indosiar channel was also prominently featured a flying fish in its logo during commercial breaks and on its ident only from 2000 to 2012.

== Prehistoric analogues ==
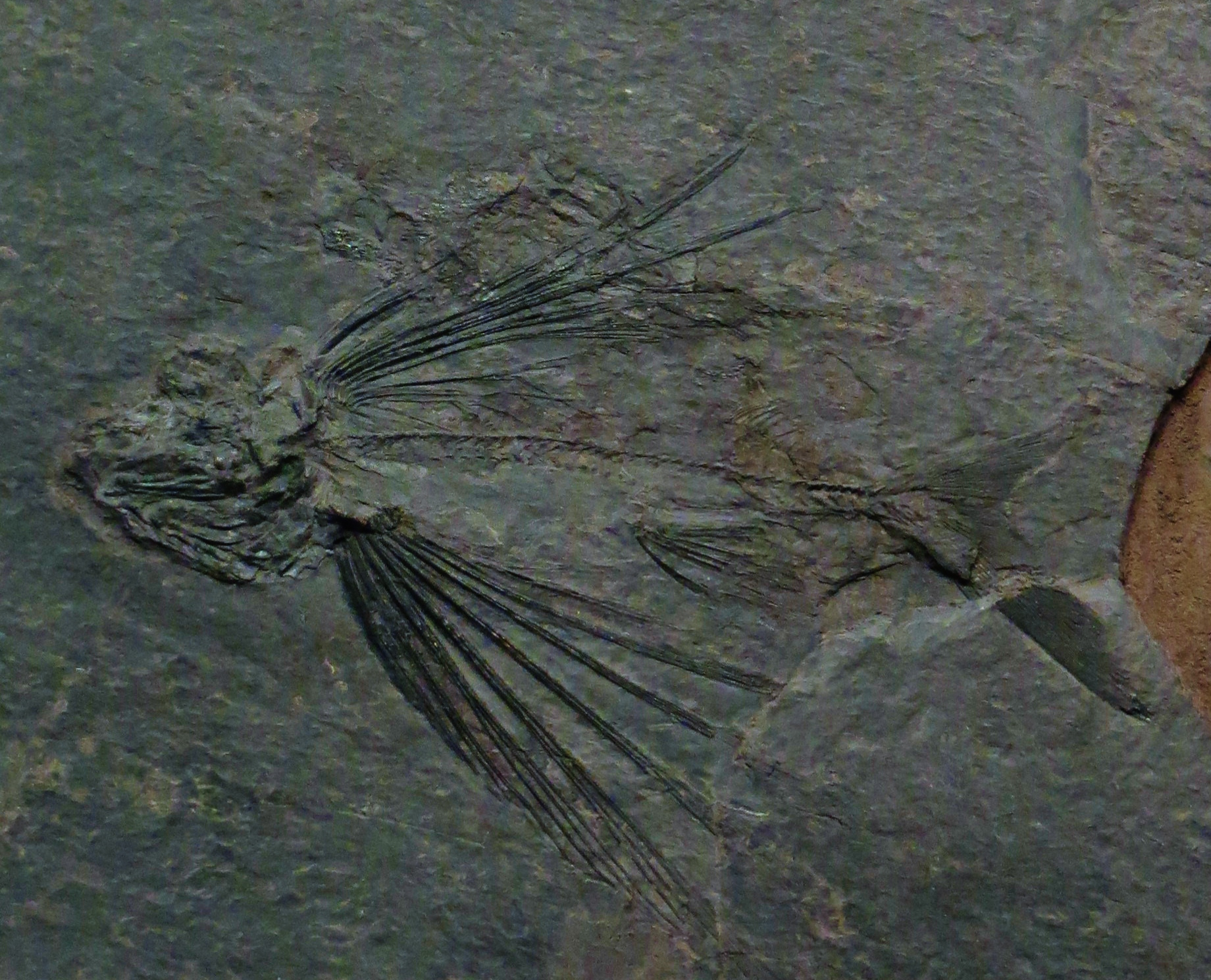

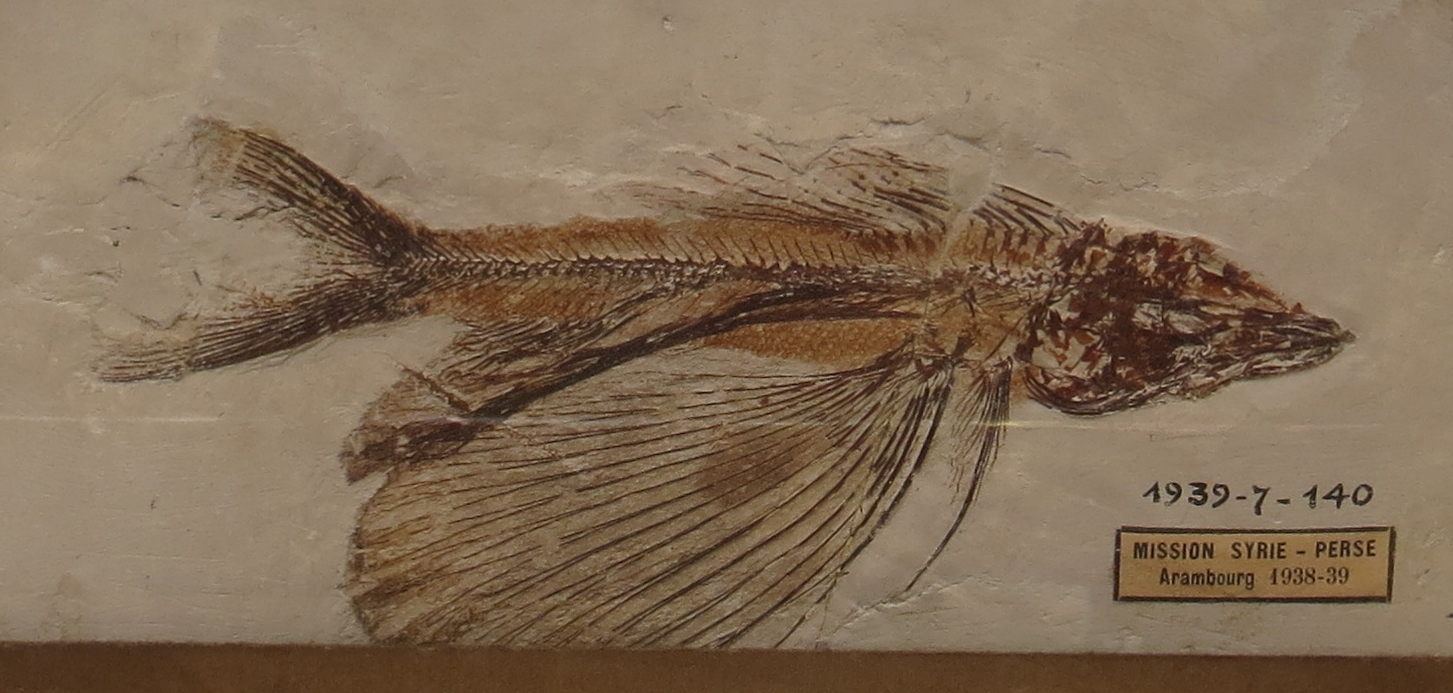
Thoracopterus (above) and Cheirothrix (below), two different Mesozoic analogues for flying fish

The oldest known fossil of a flying or gliding fish are those of the extinct family Thoracopteridae, dating back to the Middle Triassic, 235–242 million years ago. However, they are thought to be basal neopterygians and are not related to modern flying fish, with the wing-like pectoral fins being convergently evolved in both lineages. Similarly, the Cheirothricidae of the Late Cretaceous also similarly evolved wing-like pectoral fins that were likely also used for gliding, but are indeterminate eurypterygians; they are possibly Aulopiformes, which would make them most closely related to lizardfish.

== See also ==
- Flying and gliding animals
- Neuston
- Tradeoffs for locomotion in air and water
