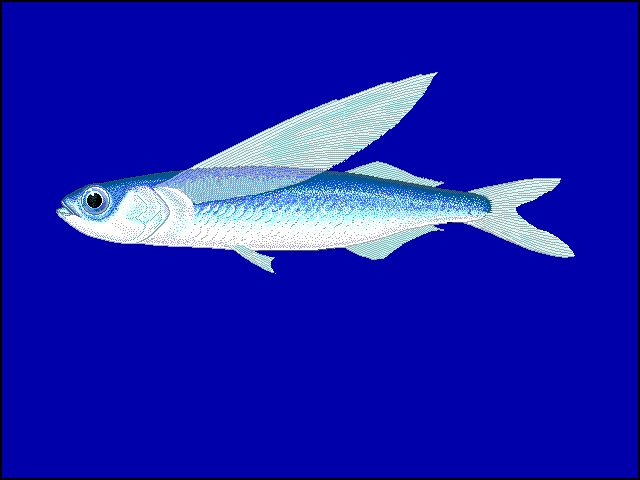
- Exocoetus volitans

Scientific classification
- Kingdom: Animalia
- Phylum: Chordata
- Class: Actinopterygii
- Division: Teleostei
- Clade: Ovalentaria
- Order: Beloniformes; L. S. Berg, 1937

Type species
- Belone belone Linnaeus 1761

Families
- Suborder Adrianichthyoidei; Adrianichthyidae; Suborder Exocoetoidei; †Forficidae; Superfamily Scomberesocoidea; Belonidae; Scomberesocidae; Superfamily Exocoetoidea; Exocoetidae; Hemiramphidae; Zenarchopteridae

Synonyms
- Exocoetiformes; Scomberesociformes

= Beloniformes =

Beloniformes Temporal range: Early Eocene to present

Order of fishes

Beloniformes /ˈbɛlənɪmɪfɔːrmiːz/ is an order composed of six families (and about 264 species) of freshwater and marine ray-finned fish:

- Adrianichthyidae (ricefish and medakas)
- Belonidae (needlefish)
- Exocoetidae (flying fishes)
- Hemiramphidae (halfbeaks)
- Scomberesocidae (sauries)
- Zenarchopteridae (viviparous halfbeaks)

With the exception of the Adrianichthyidae, these are streamlined, medium-sized fishes that live close to the surface of the water, feeding on algae, plankton, or smaller animals including other fishes. Most are marine, though a few needlefish and halfbeaks inhabit brackish and fresh waters.

The order is sometimes divided up into two suborders, the Adrianichthyoidei and the Belonoidei, although this clade is referred to as Exocoetoidei in the 5th edition of Fishes of the World. The Adrianichthyoidei contain only a single family, the Adrianichthyidae. Originally, the Adrianichthyidae were included in the Cyprinodontiformes and assumed to be closely related to the killifish, but a closer relationship to the beloniforms is indicated by various characteristics including the absence of the interhyal, resulting in the upper jaw being fixed or not protrusible. The Belonoidei may also be further subdivided into two superfamilies, the Scomberesocoidea and the Exocoetoidea. The Scomberesocoidea contain the Belonidae and Scomberesocidae, while the Exocoetoidea comprise the Exocoetidae, Hemiramphidae and Zenarchopteridae. However, newer evidence shows the flyingfishes are nested within the halfbeaks, and the needlefish and sauries are nested within the subfamily Zenarchopterinae of the family Hemiramphidae, which has been recognized as its own family. The sauries are also nested within the family Belonidae.

The beloniforms display an interesting array of jaw morphologies. The basal condition in the order excluding the ricefishes is an elongated lower jaw in juveniles and adults as represented in halfbeaks. In the needlefish and sauries, both jaws are elongated in the adults; the juveniles of most species develop through a "halfbeak stage" before having both jaws elongated. The elongated lower jaw is lost in adults and is lost in most juveniles in the flyingfishes and some halfbeak genera.

They are known for many commercial uses, and have about 260 different species. Beloniformes lack a complete sequence of mitogenomes. This leads to many variations in mtDNA, about 35 different ones. To understand evolution for Beloniformes and to identify the larvae, scientists will use Beloniformes to help them study this.

The oldest known fossil remains of the Beloniformes are from the Early Eocene-aged Monte Bolca site of Italy. These include the early halfbeak "Hemirhamphus" edwardsi and the early flyingfishes Rhamphexocoetus and "Engraulis" evolans. The extinct family Forficidae (containing the genera Rhomurus, Forfex and Zelotichthys) is known from the Late Miocene-aged Los Angeles Basin deposits in southern California. Forficidae is one of a few Pacific fish families that was extant during the Neogene but extinct today.
