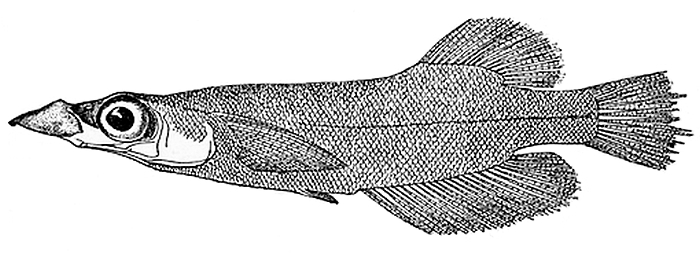

Conservation status
- Critically endangered, possibly extinct (IUCN 3.1)

Scientific classification
- Kingdom: Animalia
- Phylum: Chordata
- Class: Actinopterygii
- Order: Beloniformes
- Family: Adrianichthyidae
- Genus: Adrianichthys
- Species: A. kruyti

Binomial name
- Adrianichthys kruyti M. C. W. Weber, 1913

= Adrianichthys kruyti =

Species of fish

Adrianichthys kruyti (the duck-billed buntingi or duckbilled buntingi) is a critically endangered (possibly extinct) species of ricefish that is endemic to Lake Poso, Sulawesi, Indonesia. It was discovered by Max Carl Wilhelm Weber on his Siboga Expedition to Indonesia.

== Description ==
The duck-billed buntingi is on average about 11 cm long but can grow as long as 16 cm in length. Despite their size they were sometimes caught by local fishermen and eaten. The duck-billed buntingi has 14–16 dorsal soft rays and 24–25 anal soft rays. Its defining characteristic, which separates Adrianichthys from all other members of the family, Adrianichthyidae, is its peculiar "duck-bill," or overhanging upper jaw. It has eyes that protrude above the dorsal profile of its head and are visible from below. It also has 14–16 rays in dorsal fin and about 75 scales in lateral rows.

== Conservation ==
Some local fisherman living near Lake Poso attribute the duck-billed buntingi's dramatic decrease in population to the massive eruption of Colo Volcano on Una-Una Island in Tomini Bay in 1983. This is unlikely to be the case. Instead most scientists believe the human introduction of the predatory fishes including snakehead, Channa striata, and tilapia, Oreochromis mossambicus, most likely led to their present conservation status.

=== Conservation status ===
The duck-billed buntingi's status on the IUCN Red List changed from critically endangered to possibly extinct in 2019. Historically the species was not closely monitored so it is unclear when the species population began to decrease. It was listed as endangered until 1996 when Harrison and Stiassny published an article claiming that the duck-billed buntingi could be extinct, which led to the World Conservation Union changing the status of that species from endangered to critically endangered species on the IUCN Red List. The matter has been referred to the relevant Specialist Group for a decision. Harrison and Stiassny believe that one of the possible causes for the extinction or decline in the A. kruyti population was an introduced disease or parasite.

=== Conservation history ===
- 1988 Endangered (IUCN Conservation Monitoring Centre 1988)
- 1990 Endangered (IUCN 1990)
- 1994 Endangered (Groombridge 1994)
- 1996 Critically Endangered (IUCN 1996)
- 2019 Critically Endangered (PE) (IUCN 2019)

== Ecology ==
The duck-billed buntingi only live in Lake Poso which is a freshwater body with a pH range: 7.5 – 8.5. Although little is known about their reproductive tendencies, their predators, or who they prey on, one of their closest relatives, the Xenopoecilus poptae, may serve to give us some indication of the duck-billed buntingi's biology. X. poptae was said to have congregated in great shoals of 12–15 m deep from November to January. X. poptae reproductive systems are atypical they are believed to have voided eggs that hatched on contact with the lake water.

== Etymology ==
The specific name honours the Dutch medical missionary Albert Christian Kruyt (1889-1949) who obtained the type for Weber, and who was a colleague of Nicolaus Adriani after whom the genus Adrianichthys is named. A. kuyti is the type species of its genus.
