= Oryzias luzonensis =

Conservation status
- Endangered (IUCN 3.1)

Scientific classification
- Kingdom: Animalia
- Phylum: Chordata
- Class: Actinopterygii
- Division: Teleostei
- Order: Beloniformes
- Family: Adrianichthyidae
- Genus: Oryzias
- Species: O. luzonensis

Binomial name
- Oryzias luzonensis (Herre & Ablan, 1934)

Synonyms
- Aplocheilus luzonensis Herre & Ablan, 1934

Species of fish

Oryzias luzonensis, commonly known as the Philippine medaka or the Luzon ricefish, is a species of fish in the family Adrianichthyidae. It is endemic to freshwater creeks and rice paddies in northern Luzon in the Philippines. It is locally known as coscosleng in Ilocano. It is classified as Endangered in the IUCN Red List.

== Description ==
Oryzias luzonensis are small fish, averaging at 2.52 ± 0.21 cm (0.992 ± 0.083 in) in length. They can reach a maximum length of 4 cm (1.6 in). They have laterally-compressed bodies that are a semi-transparent gray. The bases of the fins have pale yellow coloration. A dark stripe extrens from the top of the gill cover to the base of the tail fin.

== Distribution ==
Oryzias luzonensis is the only species of ricefish found in the Philippines. It is endemic to the Laoag and Padsan watersheds of Ilocos Norte, northern Luzon, the Philippines.

They prefer slow-moving shallow bodies of water with lots of riparian vegetation, particularly Colocasia esculenta.

== Biology ==
Oryzias luzonensis is recorded to be a non-migratory species. It is a non-annual breeder.

== Use ==
Oryzias luzonensis is not considered a food fish, though it is sometimes eaten as famine food. Due to its small size, it has potential to be sold in the aquarium trade, though it is considered a difficult fish to keep in captivity. It is useful for keeping mosquito populations in check.

== Conservation ==
Oryzias luzonensis is classified as Endangered in the IUCN Red List after it had not been documented since 1985. Surviving populations were rediscovered in 2023. The Don Mariano Marcos Memorial State University has since captive-bred the species in an effort to conserve the species. Threats include habitat fragmentation, water pollution (particularly from mining industries), and the introduction of non-native invasive species (particularly Gambusia affinis and Oreochromis spp.).

== See also ==
- Japanese rice fish
