= Oryzias curvinotus =

Conservation status
- Data Deficient (IUCN 3.1)

Scientific classification
- Kingdom: Animalia
- Phylum: Chordata
- Class: Actinopterygii
- Order: Beloniformes
- Family: Adrianichthyidae
- Genus: Oryzias
- Species: O. curvinotus

Binomial name
- Oryzias curvinotus (Nichols & C. H. Pope, 1927)

Synonyms
- Aplocheilus curvinotus Nichols & Pope, 1927

Species of fish

Oryzias curvinotus, or the Curved-back ricefish,Hainan medaka, is a species of ricefish which is found in Quang Ninh Province in northern Vietnam and Hainan, Guangdong and Hong Kong in southern China and Taiwan. It is found in both fresh and brackish water. This species was described as Aplocheilus curvinotus in 1927 by J.T. Nichols and C.H. Pope with the type locality given as Nodoa, Hainan Island, China.

Oryzias curvinotus can grow to 4 cm (1.6 in) total length.
