= Sharp-jawed buntingi =

Conservation status
- Near Threatened (IUCN 3.1)

Scientific classification
- Kingdom: Animalia
- Phylum: Chordata
- Class: Actinopterygii
- Order: Beloniformes
- Family: Adrianichthyidae
- Genus: Oryzias
- Species: O. orthognathus

Binomial name
- Oryzias orthognathus Kottelat, 1990

Species of fish

The sharp-jawed buntingi (Oryzias orthognathus) is a species of ricefish in the family Adrianichthyidae. It is endemic to Lake Poso in Sulawesi, Indonesia.

== Information ==
The sharp-jawed buntingi is known to live in a freshwater environment. It is the native to the areas of Indonesia, Asia, Lake Poso, and central Sulawesi. This species is known to live within a benthopelagic range. They are also native to a tropical environment. The sharp-jawed buntingi is considered to be a non-migratory species. The maximum recorded length of this species as an unsexed male is about 6.5 centimeters or about 2.55 inches. The common length of this species is about 5 centimeters or about 1.96 inches. The Sharp-jawed buntingi is a non-annual breeder. It is considered to be difficult to have in an aquarium. It is used for human commercial use in aquariums. This species serves as no threat to humans and they are harmless.
