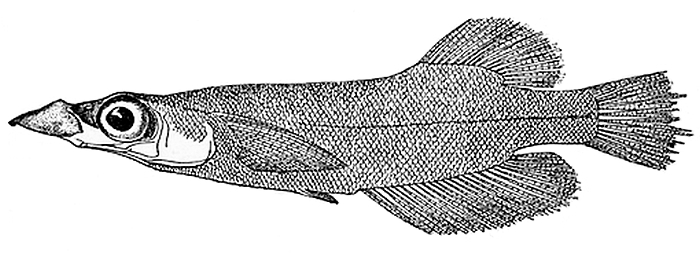
- Adrianichthys kruyti

Scientific classification
- Kingdom: Animalia
- Phylum: Chordata
- Class: Actinopterygii
- Order: Beloniformes
- Family: Adrianichthyidae
- Subfamily: Adrianichthyinae; Weber, 1913
- Genus: Adrianichthys; Weber, 1913

Type species
- Adrianichthys kruyti Weber, 1913

= Adrianichthys =

Genus of fishes

Adrianichthys is a genus of ricefishes. The genus is endemic to Lake Poso in Sulawesi, Indonesia. All four species are considered seriously threatened and two of these, A. kruyti and A. roseni, have not been recorded for decades, leading to fears that they already are extinct. Adrianichthys are larger than the Oryzias ricefish, reaching lengths of 8.5–17.1 cm (3.3–6.7 in) depending on the exact species involved. The name of this genus is a compound ending in the Greek ichthys for "fish" with the first part honouring the linguist and missionary Nicolaus Adriani (1865-1926), who collected specimens around Lake Poso.

== Species ==
There are currently four recognized species in this genus:

- Adrianichthys kruyti M. C. W. Weber, 1913 (Duckbilled buntingi)
- Adrianichthys oophorus (Kottelat, 1990) (Eggcarrying buntingi)
- Adrianichthys poptae (M. C. W. Weber & de Beaufort, 1922) (Popta's buntingi)
- Adrianichthys roseni Parenti & Soeroto, 2004
