= Oryzias carnaticus =

Conservation status
- Least Concern (IUCN 3.1)

Scientific classification
- Kingdom: Animalia
- Phylum: Chordata
- Class: Actinopterygii
- Order: Beloniformes
- Family: Adrianichthyidae
- Genus: Oryzias
- Species: O. carnaticus

Binomial name
- Oryzias carnaticus (Jerdon, 1849)

Synonyms
- Aplocheilus carnaticus Jerdon, 1849; Panchax cyanopthalma Blyth, 1858

Species of fish

Oryzias carnaticus or the spotted ricefish are a freshwater–brackish fish species native to the India, Bangladesh, Sri Lanka, and Myanmar. Their maximum length is only 3.0 centimetres (1.2 in). They are normally found near the coast, and can live in fresh water and brackish water.
