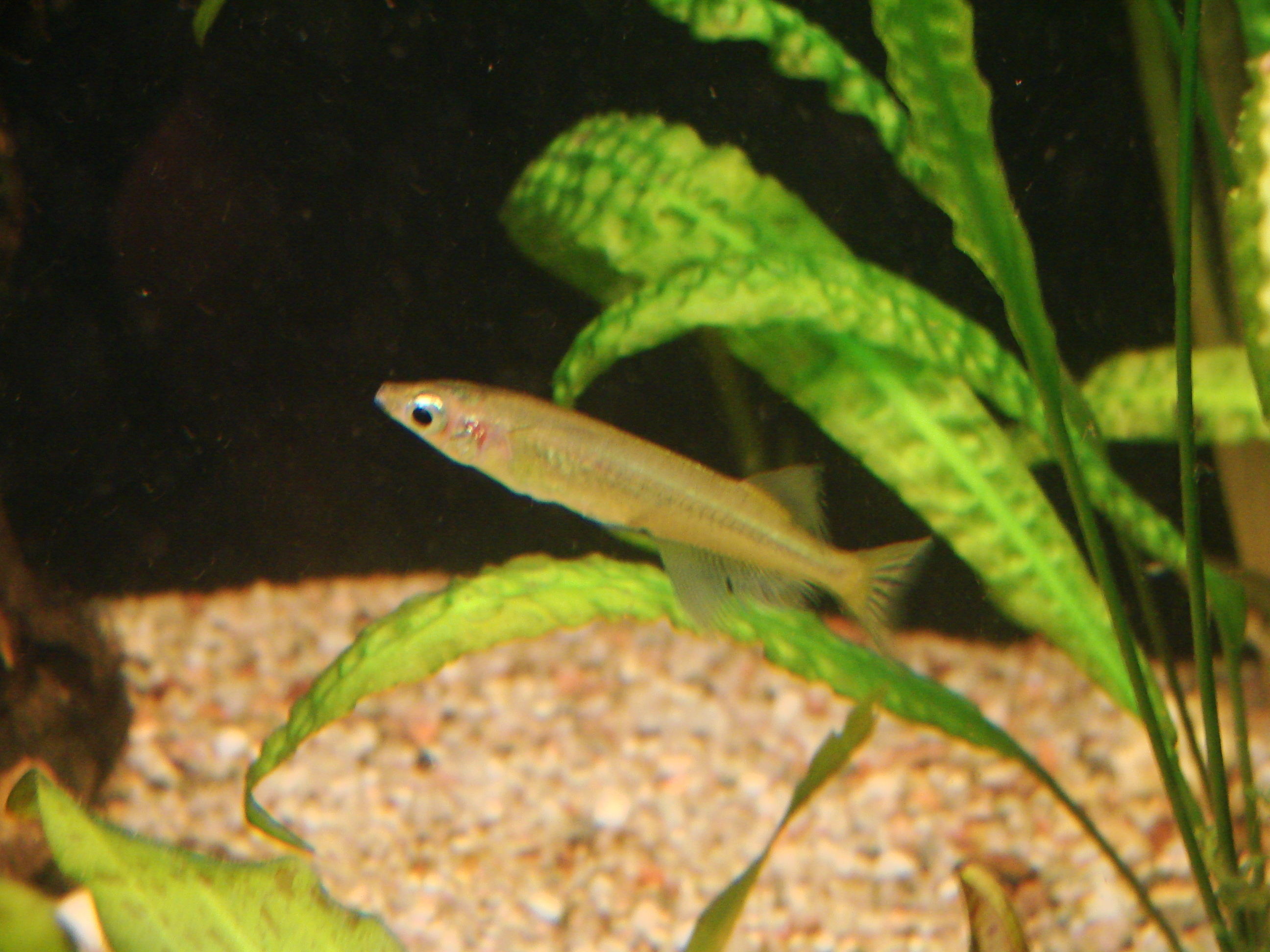

Conservation status
- Critically Endangered (IUCN 3.1)

Scientific classification
- Kingdom: Animalia
- Phylum: Chordata
- Class: Actinopterygii
- Order: Beloniformes
- Family: Adrianichthyidae
- Genus: Oryzias
- Species: O. sarasinorum

Binomial name
- Oryzias sarasinorum (Popta, 1905)

Synonyms
- Haplochilus sarasinorum Popta, 1905; Xenopoecilus sarasinorum (Popta, 1905)

= Oryzias sarasinorum =

Species of fish

Oryzias sarasinorum, the Sarasins minnow or Sarasins buntingi, is a species of ricefish in the Adrianichthyidae. It is endemic to Lake Lindu in Lore Lindu National Park, Sulawesi, Indonesia. This species was described as Haplochilus sarasinorum by C.M.L. Popta in 1905 and she named it in honour of the Swiss naturalists and second cousins Paul Sarasin (1856-1929) and Fritz Sarasin (1859-1942), the latter being the collector of the type. Although the IUCN state that the population of this fish is stabled it is threatened by introduced non native fish, common carp, Mozambique tilapia and walking catfish; and a decline in water quality caused by increased agriculture in the lake's catchment which is causing a decline in water quality, it is therefore assessed as Critically Endangered.
