= Oryzias marmoratus =

Conservation status
- Near Threatened (IUCN 3.1)

Scientific classification
- Kingdom: Animalia
- Phylum: Chordata
- Class: Actinopterygii
- Order: Beloniformes
- Family: Adrianichthyidae
- Genus: Oryzias
- Species: O. marmoratus

Binomial name
- Oryzias marmoratus (Aurich, 1935)

Synonyms
- Aplocheilus marmoratus Aurich, 1935

Species of fish

Oryzias marmoratus, also known as the marmorated ricefish or marmorated medaka, is a species of fish in the family Adrianichthyidae, from Lake Towuti, Lake Mahalona, Lake Lontoa and associated streams in Sulawesi, Indonesia.

== Information ==
Oryzias marmoratus is endemic to Indonesia. They are a vulnerable species. This species is found in freshwater within a benthopelagic range. It is native to tropical climates. They are considered to be a species that does not migrate. The maximum length of the species is about 4.1 cm (1.6 in). The males are of a grayish-brown color on the head with darker brown splotches on the body. This species is a non-annual breeder. It can be kept as an aquarium species, but it is known to be very difficult to do so. Humans use them for the commercial aquarium trade.
