= Oryzias profundicola =

Conservation status
- Near Threatened (IUCN 3.1)

Scientific classification
- Kingdom: Animalia
- Phylum: Chordata
- Class: Actinopterygii
- Order: Beloniformes
- Family: Adrianichthyidae
- Genus: Oryzias
- Species: O. profundicola

Binomial name
- Oryzias profundicola Kottelat, 1990

Species of fish

Oryzias profundicola, the yellow-finned ricefish, is a species of fish in the family Adrianichthyidae.

== Information ==
Oryzias profundicola is endemic to Lake Towuti in Sulawesi, Indonesia. This species is known to be found within a freshwater environment and located in a benthopelagic range. They are native to a tropical climate. This species can be found in the Malili Lakes system on Sulawesi. The average length of Oryzias profundicola as an unsexed male is about 5.0 centimeters or 2.3 inches. Oryzias profundicola is recorded to prefer to live on shores that are sloped slightly. These shores usually include boulders on sandy or pebbly bottoms. They live together is groups of 2 to 20 individuals. They are only found below the range of 1.5 meters. This species is a non-annual breeder. This species is identified as vulnerable to becoming an endangered species. There is no data or information that states the main factors of the population decline that lead to the evaluation that this species is vulnerable. The commonly accepted English name for this species is the Yellow Finned Ricefish.
