= Adrianichthys roseni =

Conservation status
- Critically endangered, possibly extinct (IUCN 3.1)

Scientific classification
- Kingdom: Animalia
- Phylum: Chordata
- Class: Actinopterygii
- Division: Teleostei
- Order: Beloniformes
- Family: Adrianichthyidae
- Genus: Adrianichthys
- Species: A. roseni

Binomial name
- Adrianichthys roseni Parenti & Soeroto, 2004

Species of fish

Adrianichthys roseni is a species of ricefish, a member of the family Adrianichthyidae which is endemic to Lake Poso on Sulawesi. Since the holotype was collected in 1978 there have been no reports of this species and if it still exists then it has a very low population. The IUCN categorise it as Critically Endangered (Possibly Extinct).

== Size ==
This species reaches a length of 9.0 cm (3.5 in).

== Etymology ==
The specific name honours Donn Eric Rosen (1929–1986) of the American Museum of Natural History.
