= FAM163A =

Protein found in humans

Identifiers
- Aliases: FAM163A, C1orf76, NDSP, family with sequence similarity 163 member A
- External IDs: OMIM: 611727; MGI: 3618859; GeneCards: FAM163A

Gene location (Mouse)
Chr.	Chromosome 1 (mouse)
Band	1|1 G3	Start	155,951,712 bp
Band	1|1 G3	End	156,032,596 bp
Orthologs
Databases	NCBI: entry
Species	Human	Mouse
Entrez	148753	329274
Ensembl	n/a	ENSMUSG00000015484
UniProt	Q96GL9	Q8CAA5
RefSeq (mRNA)	NM_001329712; NM_001329713; NM_001329714; NM_001329715; NM_001329716 NM_001329717; NM_001329718; NM_001329719; NM_173509; NM_001393415; NM_001393416; NM_001393417; NM_001393418; NM_001393419; NM_001393420; NM_001393421; NM_001393422; NM_001393423	NM_177838
RefSeq (protein)	NP_001316641; NP_001316642; NP_001316643; NP_001316644; NP_001316645 NP_001316646; NP_001316647; NP_001316648; NP_775780	NP_808506
Location (UCSC)	n/a	Chr 1: 155.95 – 156.03 Mb
PubMed search
- Wikidata
View/Edit Human	View/Edit Mouse

FAM163A, also known as cebelin and neuroblastoma-derived secretory protein (NDSP) is a protein that in humans is encoded by the FAM163A gene. This protein has been implicated in promoting proliferation and anchorage-independent growth of neuroblastoma cancer cells. In addition, this protein has been found to be up-regulated in the lung tissue of chronic smokers. FAM163A is found on human chromosome 1q25.2; its protein product is 167 amino acids long. FAM163A contains a very highly conserved signal peptide sequence, coded for by the first ~37 amino acids in its sequence; albeit only conserved in eukaryotes, the most distant of which being the Japanese Rice Fish.

== Gene ==
FAM163A relative location on Human Chromosome 1

FAM163A is approximately 2,927 base pairs long, containing five exons. While no domains of unknown function have been documented, the coding region of the gene is very short (~500 base pairs), with an exceptionally long and as-of-yet uncharacterized 3' untranslated region (UTR). FAM163A is located on the positive strand of chromosome 1, in loci126860, near three other genes: TOR1AIP1, TOR1AIP2, and TDRD5.

More in-depth look at gene neighborhood of FAM163A, produced by AceView

== mRNA ==
mRNA levels were tested in 45 neuroblastoma tumor samples; in 43 of these samples, elevated levels of NDSP were found, as well as in five bone marrow samples. NDSP is associated with increased risk for development of cancer metastasis in bone marrow as well as neural tissue. RNA inhibition techniques applied against NDSP decreased cellular proliferation and cancer cell colony formation. Further, this protein has been determined to act as a growth factor through an ERK-mediated pathway.

=== Splice variants ===
Several programs can be used to generate possible splice variants of the Fam163A mRNA. The Ensembl database yields one possible splice variant, which coded for the FAM163A protein. NCBI's Aceview yields 23 possible splice variants, but no experimental evidence is associated with these.

== Protein ==
The human protein has a molecular weight of 17.6 kilodaltons (kDa), and an isoelectric point of 5.56. When compared across orthologs, these values are well conserved. Lastly the ExPASy program PSORTII predicts a 39.1% chance of the protein's localization in the nucleus; this being the highest probability for any location.

Localization Area	Chances of Localization (%)
Nucleus	39.1%
Cytoplasm	21.7%
Extracellular Matrix	17.4%
Mitochondria	17.4%
Cytoskeleton	4.3%

== Homology ==
The following data was generated using the NCBI BLAST program. An interesting motif in all of these sequences is the exceptional conservation of the signal peptide sequence; Vasudevan, et al.'s studies included bioinformatic analysis that compared a paralogous protein (FAM163B) in humans and the FAM163A ortholog in mice. Their results aligned with the analysis of the orthologs presented below; while many, many more orthologs exist for FAM163A in species not listed, the Japanese Rice Fish is the last orthologous species that shares the signal peptide sequence, with the next closest result having a percent identity of less than 30% and no putative domains of conservation.

Genus and species	Common name	Evolutionary time to human divergence (MYA)	Accession #	Protein sequence length	Sequence identity to human protein (%)	Sequence similarity to human protein (%)
Homo sapiens	Human	-	NP_775780.1	167aa	-	-
Homo sapiens	Human (FAM163B - Paralog)	-	NP_001073984	166aa	42%	52%
Gorilla gorilla gorilla	Gorilla	8.8	XP_004028035	167aa	99%	98%
Felis catus	Cat	94.2	XP_003999284	166aa	92%	92%
Pteropus alecto	Black Flying Fox	94.2	XP_006907838	167aa	89%	90%
Odobenus rosmarus divergens	Pacific Walrus	94.2	XP_004398165	166aa	88%	89%
Dasypus novemcinctus	9-Banded Armadillo	104.2	XP_004461936	165aa	87%	88%
Ochotona princeps	American Pika	92.3	XP_004598689	165aa	86%	89%
Mus musculus	Mouse	92.3	Q8CAA5	168aa	85%	87%
Alligator mississippiensis	American Alligator	296	XP_006276882	161aa	66%	74%
Pelodiscus sinensis	Chinese Soft-Shelled Turtle	296	XP_004461936	164aa	64%	73%
Gallus gallus	Chicken	296	XP_001234382	159aa	61%	67%
Ophiophagus hannah	King Cobra	296	ETE64717	166aa	53%	65%
Danio rerio	Zebrafish	400.1	XP_002660900	150aa	50%	63%
Xiphophorus maculatus	Southern Platyfish	400.1	XP_005800930	163aa	48%	60%
Oryzias latipes	Japanese Rice Fish	400.1	XP_004067975	163aa	46%	60%

=== Paralogs ===
FAM163A has only one paralog: FAM163B, located on chromosome 9q34.2. Comparison between the two proteins reveals that the signal peptide sequence is identical; using the CLUSTALW program through SDSC's Biology Workbench, it was possible to visualize the sequences' identity.

== Tissue distribution ==
FAM163A is ubiquitously expressed at very low levels in most tissues of the body; expression is higher in juveniles, and as previously seen, in chronic smokers' lungs and neuroblastoma cells.
