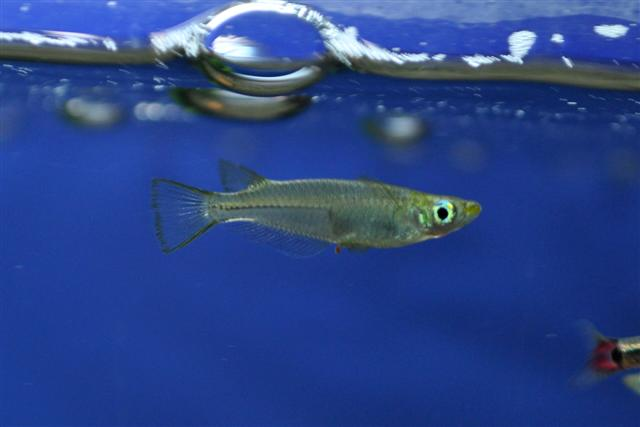

Conservation status
- Least Concern (IUCN 3.1)

Scientific classification
- Kingdom: Animalia
- Phylum: Chordata
- Class: Actinopterygii
- Order: Beloniformes
- Family: Adrianichthyidae
- Genus: Oryzias
- Species: O. sinensis

Binomial name
- Oryzias sinensis Chen, Uwa & Chu, 1989

Synonyms
- Oryzias latipes sinensis Chen, Uwa & Chu, 1989

= Chinese rice fish =

Species of fish

The Chinese rice fish (Oryzias sinensis) is a species of fish in the genus Oryzias. This freshwater fish occurs in swamps, stagnant parts of streams, rice fields and marshes, and is up to 3.1 cm (1.2 in) long. It was formerly considered a subspecies of the Japanese rice fish (Oryzias latipes). The natural range of the Chinese rice fish is in East and Southeast Asia, including the Yangtze, Mekong, Irrawaddy, Salween, Red River and Nanpangjiang basins. It has been introduced to Kazakhstan and Russia (in the lower Kuban drainage); also spreading in the Azov basin and has been discovered in the Obytichna River in Ukraine.

== Ecological niche ==
Chinese Rice Fish have been utilized in China and Asia for hundreds of years for rice farming. This process allows the fish to provide protein to the rice, enhancing the food. It is proven that in the presence of rice fish, rice fields grow better, and the rice yield is increased by approximately 4–15%.

Diet consists of both plants and animals. These omnivores consume plants, microscopic organisms including zooplankton and algae, and parts of insects. This introduces another biological role Chinese Rice fish play, controlling the pest population within the rice fields. The ideal environment for Chinese Rice Fish are inland freshwater and wetlands areas of shallow, slow moving water sources, especially those close to shorelines that contain vegetative cover. Rice paddies, ponds, and farming channels tend to harbor these ideal environments. When water temperatures cool, Chinese Rice Fish exhibit behaviors of hibernation. While there has not been much research conducted on the role of Chinese Rice Fish in the food web, they are primarily preyed on by dragonfly larvae, other fish, and birds. Most live for roughly one year in the wild, while in captivity, they can live for four years or more.

== Roles as invasive species ==
Chinese Rice Fish are seen as high risk for becoming an invasive species. They were accidentally introduced to the Yarlung Zangbo River, where it is suggested that their small size assisted successful survival and reproduction rates. This accidental success demonstrated how they can adapt to different ecosystems. Chinese Rice fish also received a high CCA score, indicating they benefit from global warming, as warming waters will bring more waters into the appropriate range of temperatures that Chinese Rice fish need for reproduction.

== Phylogeny ==
Originally, Chinese Rice fish (now labeled as Oryzias sinensis) were considered part of the Japanese Rice Fish (Oryzias latipes) species. Mitochondrial data suggest that populations of rice fish found in Taiwan and the China-West Korean area have phylogenetic differences from latipes. There is still difficulty distinguishing which populations of rice fish in Eastern Asia belong to which species, as they have similar functions in the food and farming industry. Chinese Rice Fish are still commonly referred to as Japanese Rice Fish.

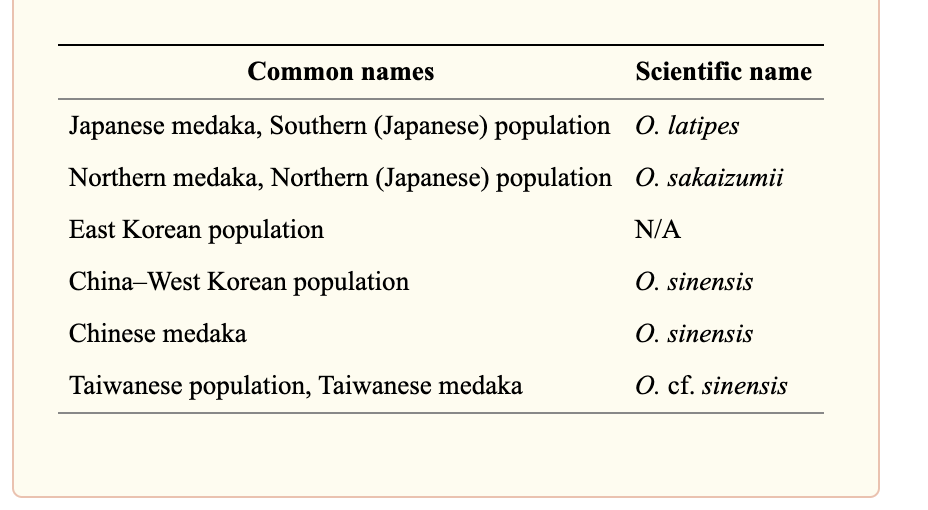
Table shows scientific names of the different lineages from the Medaka organism.

== Use in research ==
Chinese rice fish are noted to be model organisms. They are generally easy to raise due to their undemanding diet and habitat needs. Their short generation times and transparent eggs also make them ideal for observing.
