= Oryzias melastigma =

Conservation status
- Least Concern (IUCN 3.1)

Scientific classification
- Kingdom: Animalia
- Phylum: Chordata
- Class: Actinopterygii
- Order: Beloniformes
- Family: Adrianichthyidae
- Genus: Oryzias
- Species: O. melastigma

Binomial name
- Oryzias melastigma (McClelland, 1839)

Synonyms
- Aplocheilus melastigmus McClelland, 1839

Species of fish

Oryzias melastigma is a species of ricefish in the family Adrianichthyidae. This killifish was described by Sir John McLelland in 1839. It is listed as Least Concern on the IUCN Red List.

== Range ==
Oryzias melastigma is native to India and Bangladesh.

== Habitat ==
Oryzias melastigma lives in brackish waters and estuaries, however, it can be found in mangrove swamps and shallow lagoons, and can easily adapt to freshwater, even being able to spawn there.

== Description ==
This fish has a greyish/light-brownish translucent scale colour and the rim of its tail fin is yellow. Its shape is fairly streamlined and it has a triangular-shaped dorsal fin which is quite close to the tail fin. Its anal fin is very large and its pelvic fins, which are just in front of the anal fin, are very small. It has large eyes and its mouth is fairly high up on its body.
