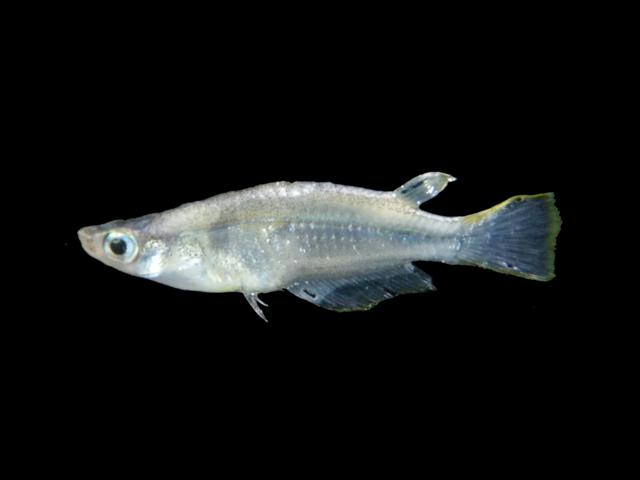

Conservation status
- Least Concern (IUCN 3.1)

Scientific classification
- Kingdom: Animalia
- Phylum: Chordata
- Class: Actinopterygii
- Order: Beloniformes
- Family: Adrianichthyidae
- Genus: Oryzias
- Species: O. javanicus

Binomial name
- Oryzias javanicus (Bleeker, 1854)

Synonyms
- Aplocheilus javanicus Bleeker, 1854

= Oryzias javanicus =

Species of fish

Oryzias javanicus, the Javan ricefish or Javanese ricefish, is a small species of fish in the family Adrianichthyidae. It lives in Peninsular Thailand, Peninsular Malaysia, Singapore, and Indonesia (Java, Sumatra, Borneo, Sulawesi, Bali and Lombok), where it can be seen in both brackish and fresh water in ponds, ditches, mangrove, swamps, streams and canals.

It can grow to 4.5 cm (1.8 in) in total length.
