= Egg-carrying buntingi =

Conservation status
- Least Concern (IUCN 3.1)

Scientific classification
- Kingdom: Animalia
- Phylum: Chordata
- Class: Actinopterygii
- Order: Beloniformes
- Family: Adrianichthyidae
- Genus: Adrianichthys
- Species: A. oophorus

Binomial name
- Adrianichthys oophorus (Kottelat, 1990)

Synonyms
- Xenopoecilus oophorus Kottelat, 1990

Species of fish

The egg-carrying buntingi (Adrianichthys oophorus) is a species of fish in the family Adrianichthyidae. It is endemic to Lake Poso in Sulawesi, Indonesia.

== Information ==
The egg-carrying buntingi is known to be found in a freshwater environment within a pelagic depth range. This species is native to a tropical environment. The maximum recorded length of the egg-carrying buntingi as an unsexed male is about 8.5 centimeters or about 3.34 inches. The most common recorded length for this species as an unsexed male is about 6.5 centimeters or about 2.55 inches. This species is distributed in the areas of Asia or Indonesia. The eggs of this species are carried between the pelvic fins, and each egg is attached to the body by filaments. The egg-carrying buntingi can be specifically found in the Lake Poso in central Sulawesi. This species has the ability to live in an aquarium as long as it is a freshwater aquarium.

Male and female egg-carrying buntingi can be distinguished by the size of their pelvic fins. Females usually have longer pelvic fins because they are the offspring carriers. Recent studies have shown that egg-carrying buntingi tend to reproduce during rainy seasons because it causes the lake level to rise.
