= Oryzias celebensis =

Conservation status
- Least Concern (IUCN 3.1)

Scientific classification
- Kingdom: Animalia
- Phylum: Chordata
- Class: Actinopterygii
- Order: Beloniformes
- Family: Adrianichthyidae
- Genus: Oryzias
- Species: O. celebensis

Binomial name
- Oryzias celebensis (M. C. W. Weber, 1894)

Synonyms
- Haplochilus celebensis Weber, 1894; Aplocheilus celebensis (Weber, 1894)

Species of fish

Oryzias celebensis, the Celebes medaka, fish in the family Adrianichthyidae. It is endemic to rivers, streams, and lakes on the Indonesian island of Sulawesi and one river in Timor-Leste.

== Environment ==
Oryzias celebensis is commonly found in a freshwater environment within a benthopelagic depth range. They are native to a tropical climate. It has been recorded in coastal ponds with a tidal influence as well as in narrow, forested rivers.

== Size ==
Oryzias celebensis can reach the maximum length of about 4.5 centimeters or about 1.77 inches as an unsexed male.

== Distribution ==
Oryzias celebensis is found in Sulawesi and East Timor.

== Biology ==
Oryzias celebensis is recorded to be a non-annual breeder. This species can be kept in an aquarium, but it is very difficult.

== Naming ==
This species was described as Haplochilus celebensis by M.C.W. Weber in 1984 with the type locality given as Makassar, Maros River near Maros, Sulawesi.
