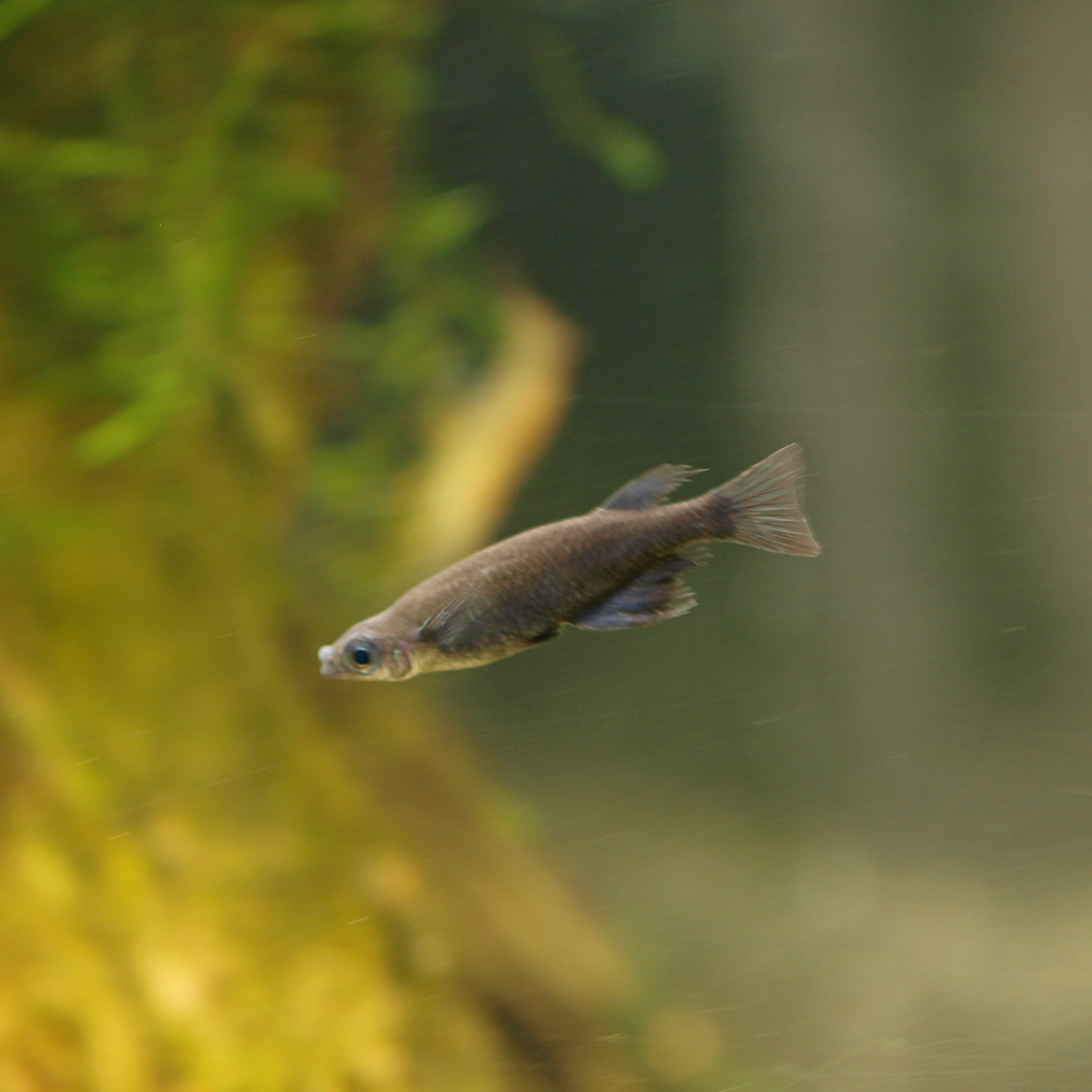

Conservation status
- Near Threatened (IUCN 3.1)

Scientific classification
- Kingdom: Animalia
- Phylum: Chordata
- Class: Actinopterygii
- Order: Beloniformes
- Family: Adrianichthyidae
- Genus: Oryzias
- Species: O. nigrimas

Binomial name
- Oryzias nigrimas Kottelat, 1990

= Black buntingi =

Species of fish

The black buntingi (Oryzias nigrimas) is a species of fish in the family Adrianichthyidae. It is endemic to Lake Poso in Sulawesi, Indonesia, here it is a pelagic species found over sand and pebble substrates.
