= Oryzias matanensis =

Conservation status
- Near Threatened (IUCN 3.1)

Scientific classification
- Kingdom: Animalia
- Phylum: Chordata
- Class: Actinopterygii
- Order: Beloniformes
- Family: Adrianichthyidae
- Genus: Oryzias
- Species: O. matanensis

Binomial name
- Oryzias matanensis (Aurich, 1935)

Synonyms
- Aplocheilus matanensis Aurich, 1935

Species of fish

Oryzias matanensis, the Matano ricefish, is a species of fish in the family Adrianichthyidae. It is endemic to Lake Matano in Sulawesi, Indonesia.

== Information ==
This species is known to be found within a freshwater environment within a benthopelagic range. They are native to a tropical climate. Oryzias matanensis is a non-annual breeder that is known to not migrate. The males of this species are differentiated from other species in its genus by its specific color pattern. The average length of this species as an unsexed male is about 5.5 centimeters or 2.16 inches. If kept in an aquarium, it known to be difficult to maintain this species. The threats and reasoning has not been documented as to why this species is recorded as being near threatened. The only human use that this fish provides is a commercial use for aquariums.
