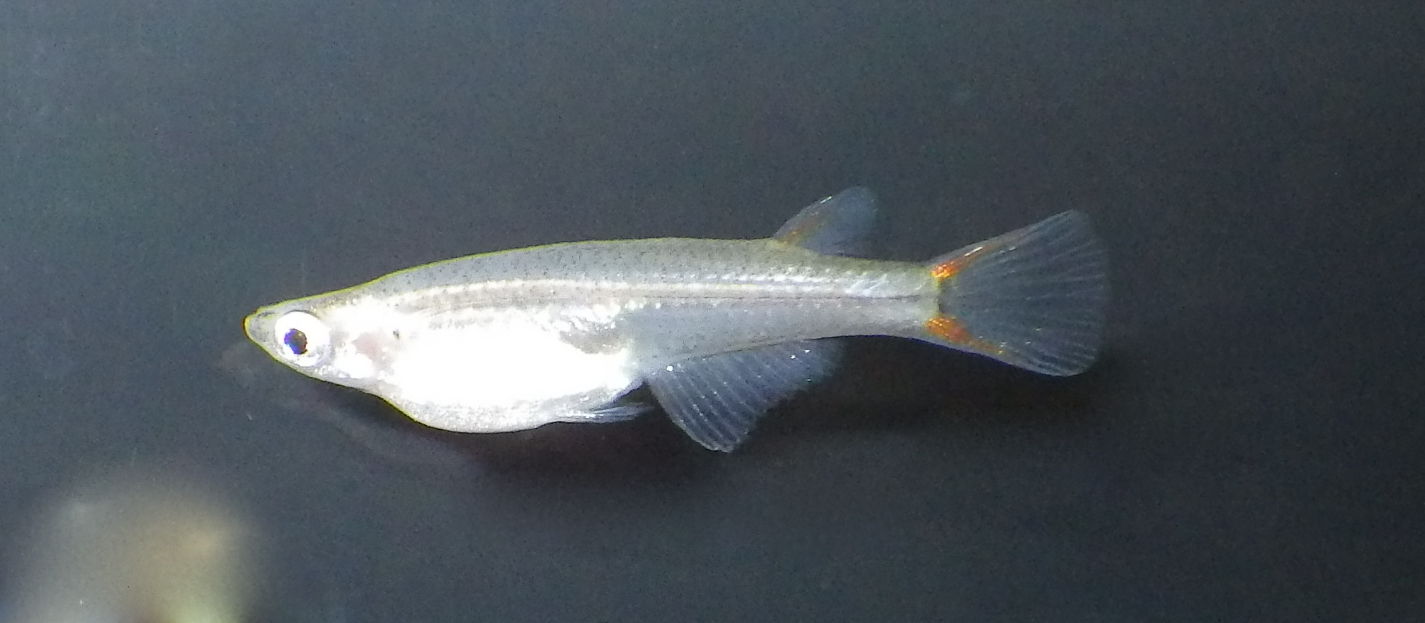
- Female specimen

Conservation status
- Least Concern (IUCN 3.1)

Scientific classification
- Kingdom: Animalia
- Phylum: Chordata
- Class: Actinopterygii
- Order: Beloniformes
- Family: Adrianichthyidae
- Genus: Oryzias
- Species: O. mekongensis

Binomial name
- Oryzias mekongensis Uwa & Magtoon, 1986

= Oryzias mekongensis =

Species of fish

Oryzias mekongensis is a species of fish in the family Adrianichthyidae. It is endemic to the Mekong River Basin in southeast Asia, where it is found in ditches, canals and ponds.

== Information ==
Oryzias mekongensis is known to be found in a freshwater environment within a benthopelagic range. This species is also considered to be a non-migratory species. It is native to a tropical environment. The maximum recorded length of Oryzias mekongensis as an unsexed male is about 3 centimeters or about 1.18 inches. The upper and lower edge of their caudal fin has bright orange margins. The fish is known to occupy shallow, permanent standing water of ditches, canals, and ponds. It is mainly found in water that has a lot of growth of submerged aquatic plants with divided leaves. When it comes to their diet, they are known to feed on plankton. Oryzias mekongensis is only caught with fine-meshed nets or when larger nets pull out large amounts of plants, which allows the fishes to get trapped in them. This species of fish is not used in the markets for consumption. This species is also not considered to be an annual breeder. Although it is possible, it is known to be very difficult to maintain this species in an aquarium. It is used for commercial use. This species been recorded to have been collected mainly from clear water swamps that might possibly contain acidic water. The major threats to this species' population rate would include habitat destruction and degradation that is primarily caused by urban development and also agriculture. The common name of this species in English is the Mekong ricefish.

== Distribution ==
The distribution of the Oryzias mekongensis includes the following areas:

- Mekong River system
- northeastern Thailand
- Vietnam
- Laos
- Cambodia
