= Oryzias dancena =

Conservation status
- Least Concern (IUCN 3.1)

Scientific classification
- Kingdom: Animalia
- Phylum: Chordata
- Class: Actinopterygii
- Division: Teleostei
- Order: Beloniformes
- Family: Adrianichthyidae
- Genus: Oryzias
- Species: O. dancena

Binomial name
- Oryzias dancena F. Hamilton, 1822

Synonyms
- Cyprinus dancena Hamilton, 1822; Aplocheilus mcclellandi Bleeker, 1854; Panchax cyanopthalma Blyth, 1858

Species of fish

Oryzias dancena or the Indian ricefish are a freshwater–brackish fish species native to the India, Bangladesh, Sri Lanka, Myanmar and Thailand. Their maximum length is 3.1 centimetres (1.2 in) to 4 centimetres (1.6 in). They are normally found in brackish habitats near the coast, but it lives in fresh water as well. It is not considered threatened. This species was described as Cyprinus dancena by Francis Buchanan-Hamilton in 1822 with the type locality given as "Estuary below Calcutta".
