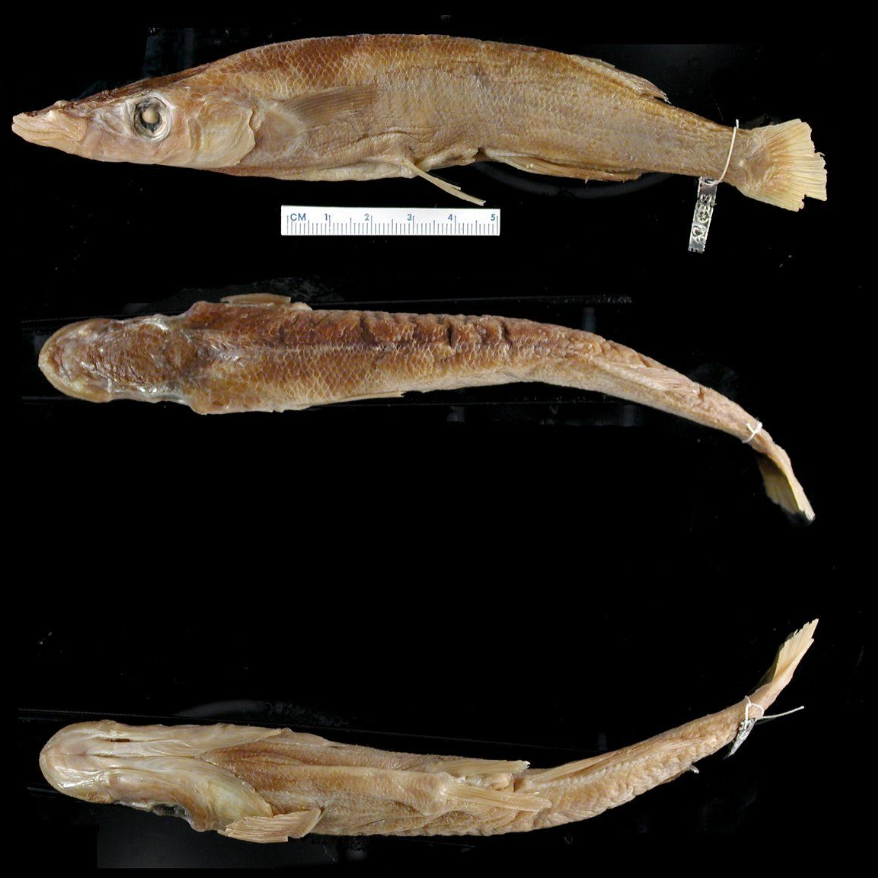

Conservation status
- Endangered (IUCN 3.1)

Scientific classification
- Kingdom: Animalia
- Phylum: Chordata
- Class: Actinopterygii
- Order: Beloniformes
- Family: Adrianichthyidae
- Genus: Adrianichthys
- Species: A. poptae

Binomial name
- Adrianichthys poptae (M. C. W. Weber & de Beaufort, 1922)

Synonyms
- Xenopoecilus poptae M. C. W. Weber & de Beaufort, 1922

= Popta's buntingi =

Species of fish

Popta's buntingi (Adrianichthys poptae) is an endangered species of fish in the family Adrianichthyidae. It is endemic to Lake Poso in Sulawesi, Indonesia.

== Etymology ==
This species was described by Max Carl Wilhelm Weber and Lieven Ferdinand de Beaufort in 1922 and they gave it the species name poptae in honour of their fellow Dutch ichthyologist Canna Maria Louise Popta (1860-1929).
