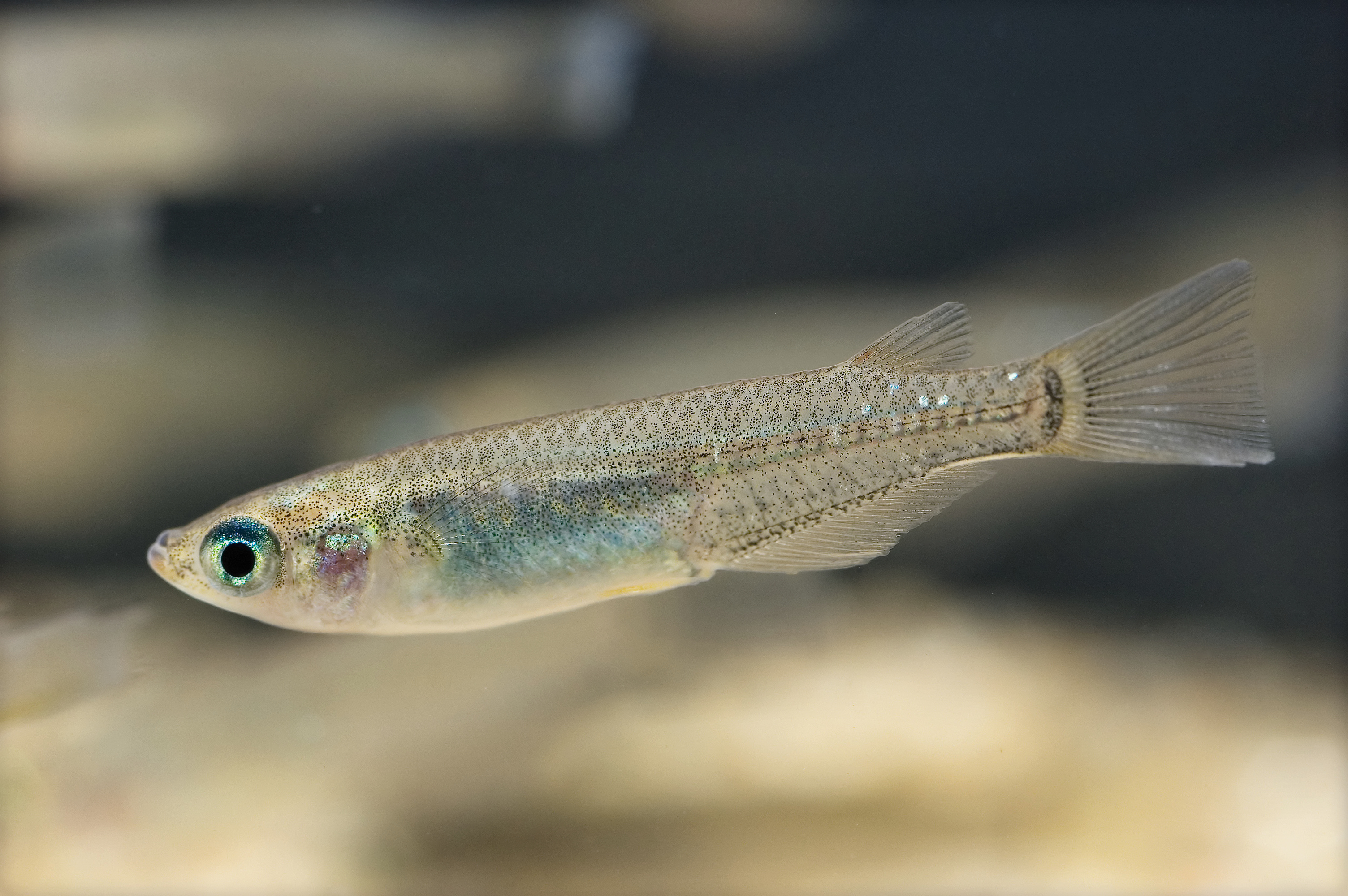
- Japanese rice fish (O. latipes)

Scientific classification
- Kingdom: Animalia
- Phylum: Chordata
- Class: Actinopterygii
- Order: Beloniformes
- Family: Adrianichthyidae
- Subfamily: Oryziinae; Myers,1938
- Genus: Oryzias; D. S. Jordan & Snyder, 1906

Type species
- Poecila latipes (Temminck & Schlegel, 1846)

Synonyms
- Horaichthys Kulkarni, 1940; Xenopoecilus Regan, 1911

= Oryzias =

Genus of fishes

Oryzias is a genus of ricefishes native to fresh and brackish water in east and south Asia. Some species are widespread and the Japanese rice fish (O. latipes) is commonly used in science as a model organism, while others have very small ranges and are threatened. They are small, up to 8 cm (3.1 in) long, and most are relatively plain in colour.

The genus name Oryzias is a reference to the scientific name for rice, Oryza.

They have an unusual reproductive behavior where the female facultatively (optionally) carries the eggs in a cluster at the pelvic or anal fins for a period after they have been fertilized.

== Species ==
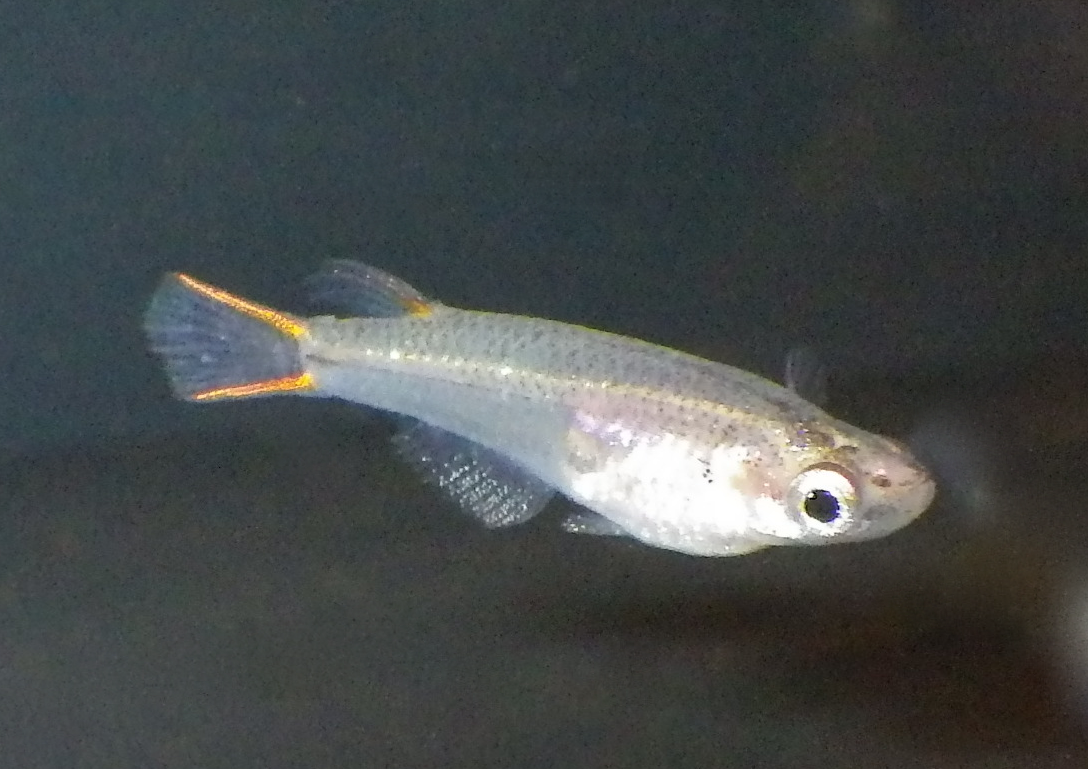
Oryzias mekongensis

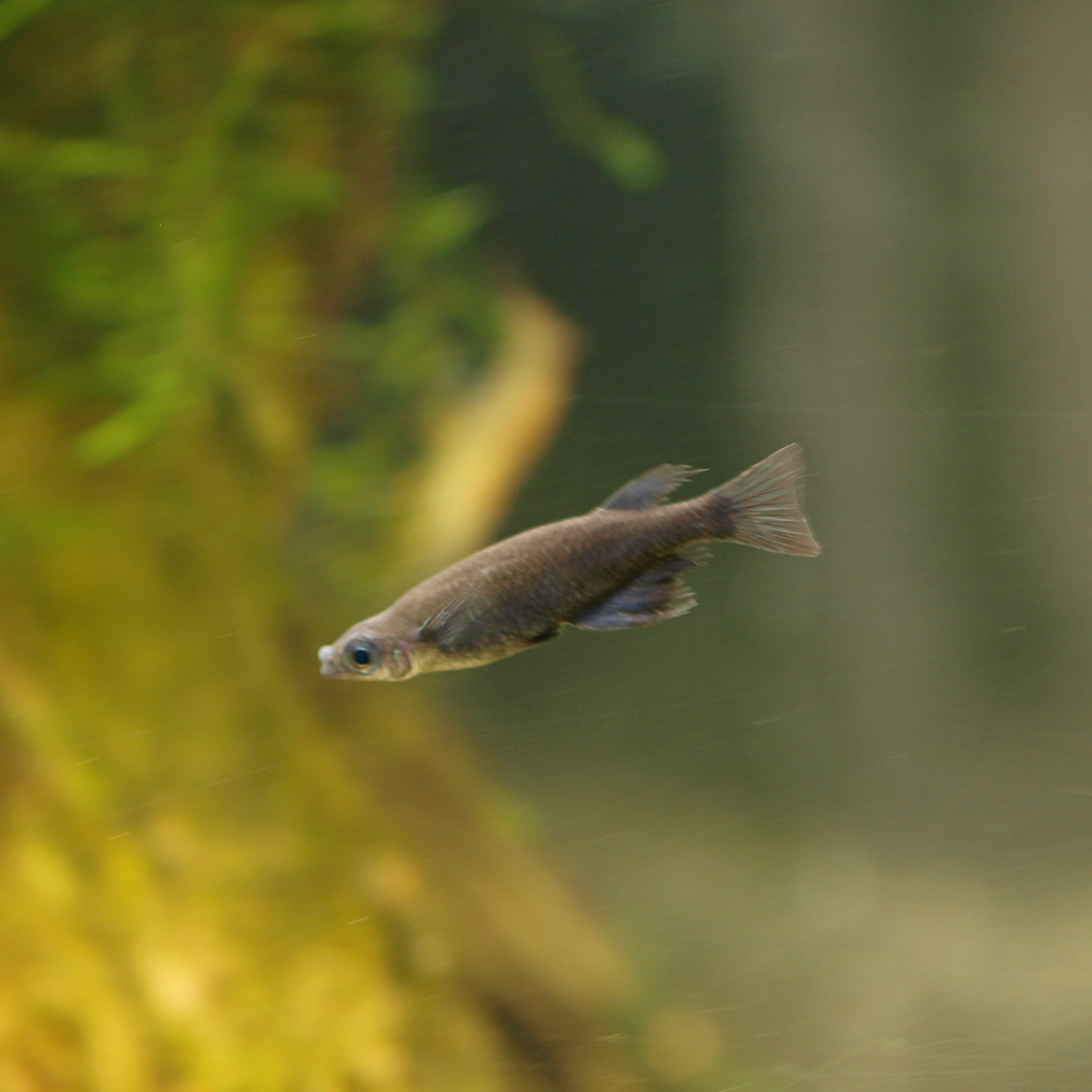
Oryzias nigrimas

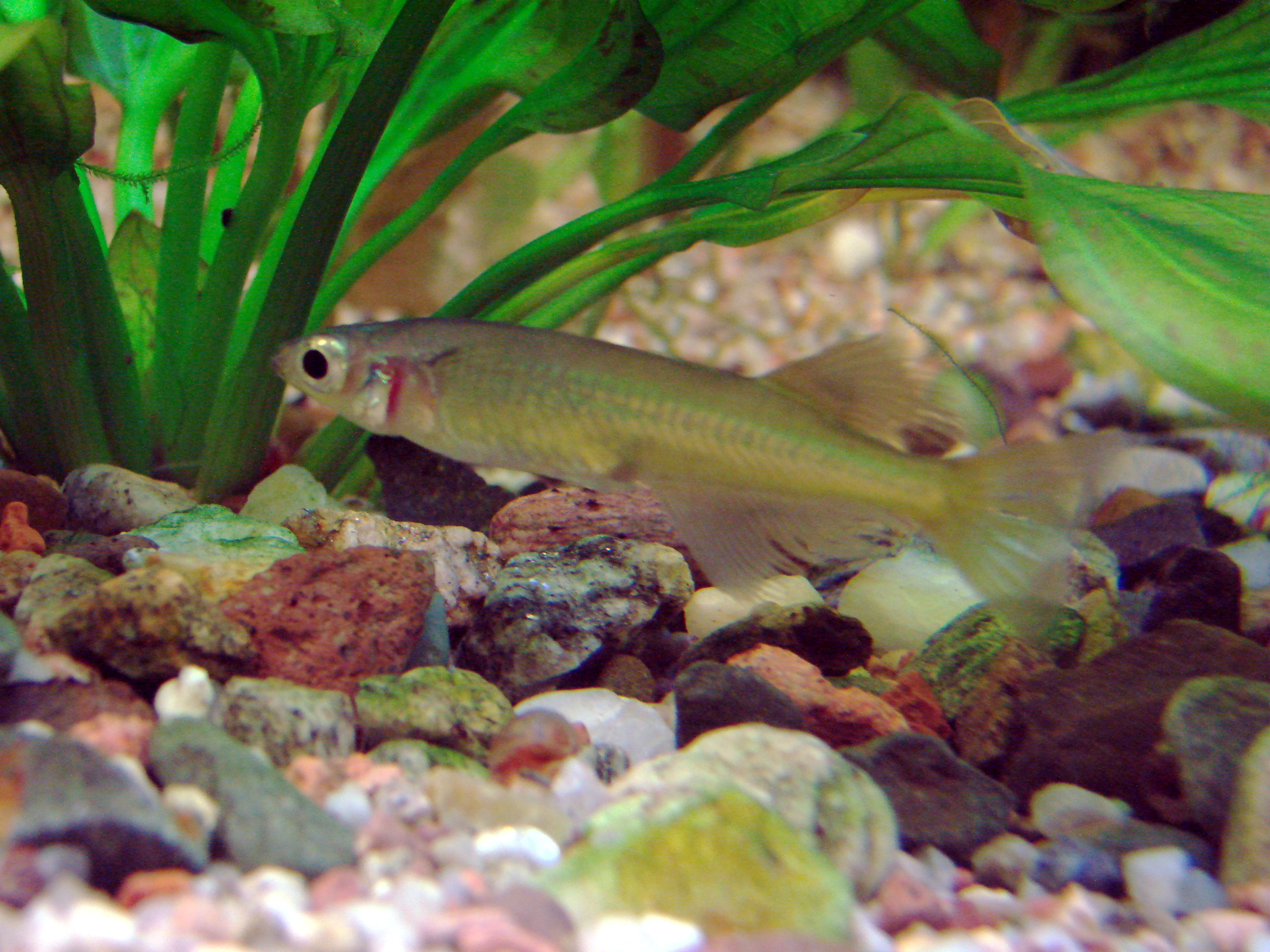
Oryzias sarasinorum

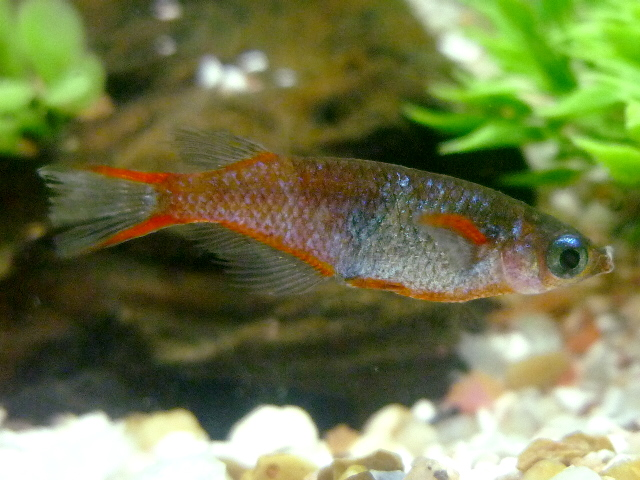
Oryzias woworae

These are the currently recognized species in this genus:

- Oryzias asinua Parenti, Hadiaty, Lumbantobing & Herder, 2013
- Oryzias bonneorum Parenti, 2008
- Oryzias carnaticus Jerdon, 1849
- Oryzias cabaranensis Chen, Yeh & Lai, 2025
- Oryzias celebensis Weber, 1894 (Celebes medaka)
- Oryzias curvinotus Nichols & Pope, 1927
- Oryzias dancena Hamilton, 1822
- Oryzias dopingdopingensis Mandagi, Mokodongan, Tanaka & Yamahira, 2018
- Oryzias eversi Herder, Hadiaty & Nolte, 2012
- Oryzias hadiatyae Herder & Chapuis, 2010 (Renny's ricefish)
- Oryzias haugiangensis Roberts, 1998
- Oryzias hubbsi Roberts, 1998
- Oryzias javanicus Bleeker, 1854 (Javanese ricefish)
- Oryzias kalimpaaensis Gani, Suhendra, Herder, Schwarzer, Möhring, Montenegro, Herjayanto & Mokodongan, 2022
- Oryzias landangiensis Utama, Mandagi, Lawelle, Masengi, Watanabe, Sawada, Nagano, Kusumi & Yamahira, 2022
- Oryzias latipes Temminck & Schlegel, 1846 (Japanese ricefish)
- Oryzias loxolepis Kobayashi, Mokodongan, Horoiwa, Fujimoto, Tanaka, Masengi & Yamahira, 2023
- Oryzias luzonensis Herre & Ablan, 1934
- Oryzias marmoratus Aurich, 1935 (Marmorated medaka)
- Oryzias matanensis Aurich, 1935 (Matano medaka)
- Oryzias mekongensis Uwa & Magtoon, 1986
- Oryzias melastigma McClelland, 1839
- Oryzias minutillus Smith, 1945 (Dwarf medaka)
- Oryzias moramoensis Utama, Mokodongan, Lawelle, Masengi & Yamahira, 2024
- Oryzias nebulosus Parenti & Soeroto, 2004
- Oryzias nigrimas Kottelat, 1990 (black buntingi)
- Oryzias orthognathus Kottelat, 1990 (Sharp-jawed buntingi)
- Oryzias pectoralis Roberts, 1998
- Oryzias polylepis Möhring, Mokodongan, Gani, Wowor, Annawaty, Böhne & Herder, 2025
- Oryzias profundicola Kottelat, 1990 (Yellow finned medaka)
- Oryzias sakaizumii Asai, Senou & Hosoya, 2012 (Northern medaka)
- Oryzias sarasinorum Popta, 1905 (Sarasins minnow)
- Oryzias setnai Kulkarni, 1940 (Malabar ricefish)
- Oryzias sinensis Chen, Uwa & Chu, 1989
- Oryzias soerotoi Mokodongan, Tanaka & Yamahira, 2014
- Oryzias songkhramensis Magtoon, 2010
- Oryzias timorensis Weber & de Beaufort, 1922
- Oryzias uwai Roberts, 1998
- Oryzias wolasi Parenti, Hadiaty, Lumbantobing & Herder, 2013
- Oryzias woworae Parenti & Hadiaty, 2010
