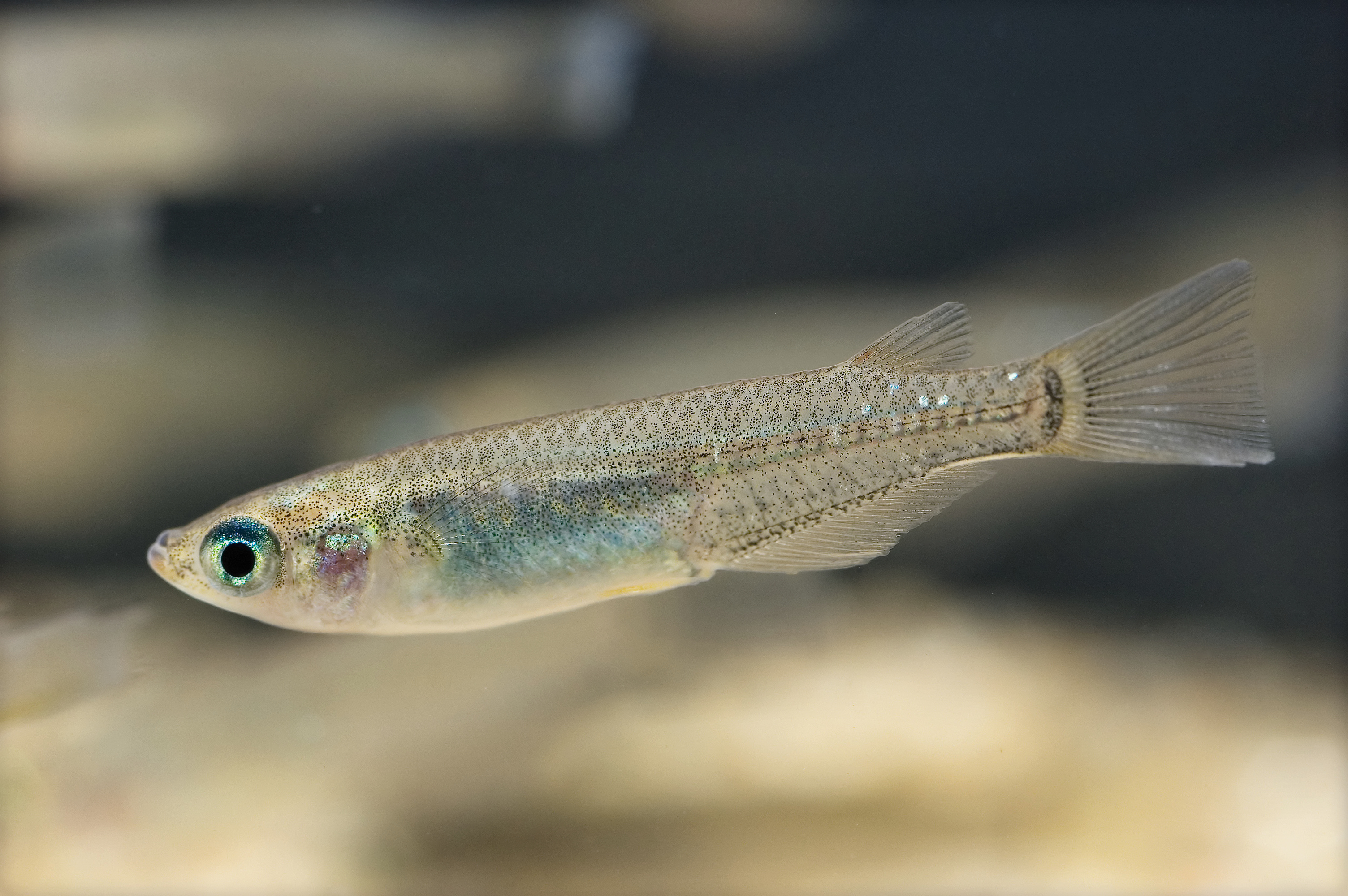

Conservation status
- Least Concern (IUCN 3.1)

Scientific classification
- Kingdom: Animalia
- Phylum: Chordata
- Class: Actinopterygii
- Division: Teleostei
- Order: Beloniformes
- Family: Adrianichthyidae
- Genus: Oryzias
- Species: O. latipes

Binomial name
- Oryzias latipes (Temminck & Schlegel 1846)

Synonyms
- Poecilia latipes Temminck & Schlegel, 1846; Aplocheilus latipes (Temminck & Schlegel, 1846)

= Japanese rice fish =

Species of fish

The Japanese rice fish (Oryzias latipes), also known as the medaka, is a member of genus Oryzias (ricefish), the only genus in the subfamily Oryziinae. This small (up to about 3.6 cm or 1.4 in) native of Japan is a denizen of rice paddies, marshes, ponds, slow-moving streams and tide pools. It is euryhaline, occurring in both brackish and freshwater. It became popular as an aquarium fish because of its hardiness and pleasant coloration: its coloration varies from creamy-white to yellowish in the wild to white, creamy-yellow, or orange in aquarium-bred individuals. Bright yellow, red or green transgenic populations, similar to GloFish, have also been developed, but are banned from sale in the EU. The medaka has been a popular pet since the 17th century in Japan. After fertilization, the female carries her eggs attached anterior to the anal fin for a period before depositing them on plants or similar things.

== Ecology ==
Medaka live in small ponds, shallow rivers, and rice fields. They can survive in a wide range of water temperatures (0–42 °C or 32–108 °F), but they prefer a water temperature of 15–28 °C (59–82 °F). Since they eat juvenile mosquitoes and small plankton, they are known as a beneficial organism for humans. They produce 10–20 eggs per birth, and they can produce eggs every day in laboratory conditions. They are seasonal breeding animals and usually lay eggs between spring and summer. They prefer to lay eggs around water grass and often prefer living in rice fields. The egg usually requires 4–10 days to hatch. They have an advanced renal function, which enables them to live in saltwater and brackish water. The average life span of this species in the wild is estimated to be 2 years, though in laboratory conditions they can survive 3–5 years. They live in schools, and they can recognize the faces of other individual medaka.

== Taxonomy and range ==
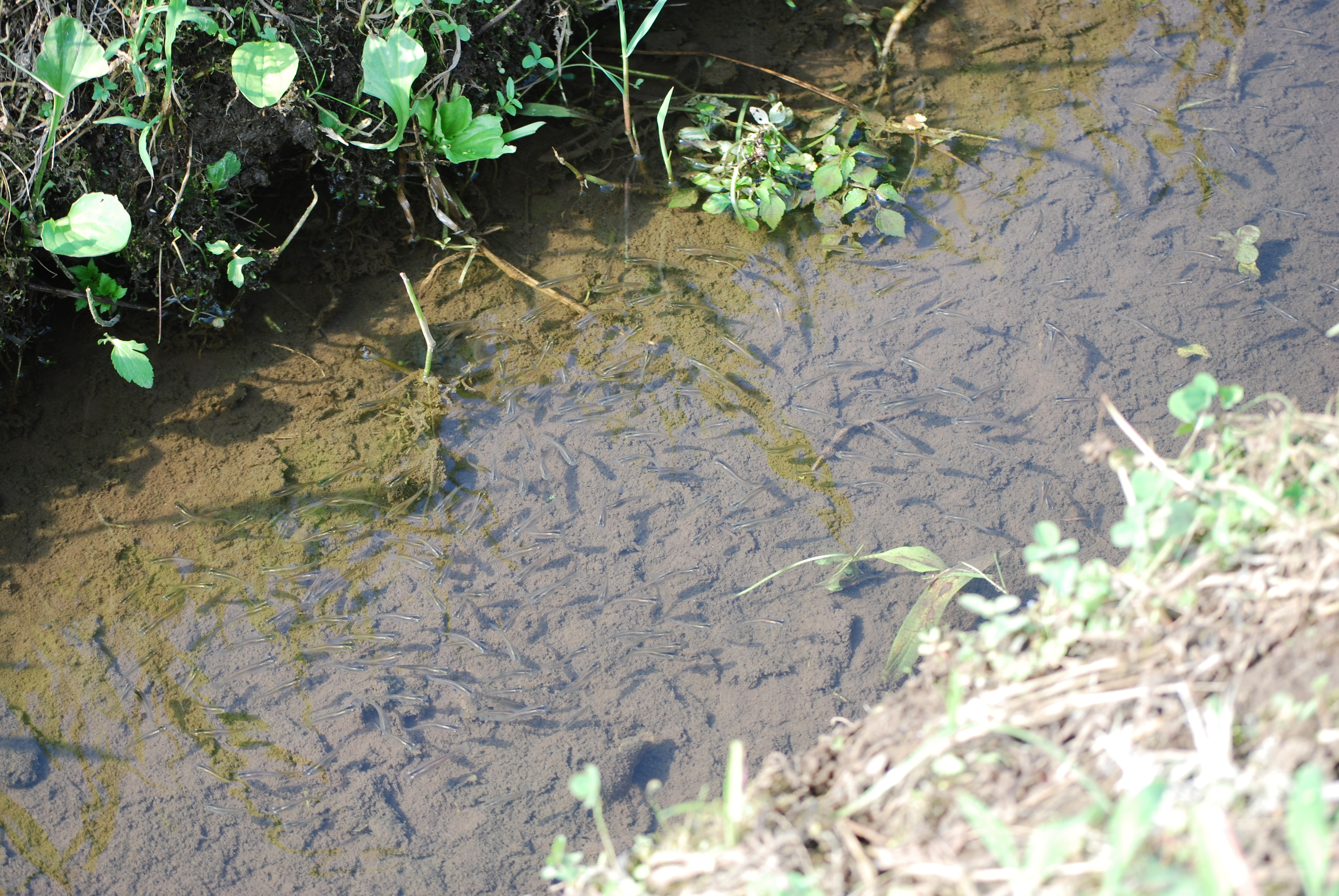
A group in a shallow ditch, a typical habitat of the species (Katori, Japan)

As originally defined, O. latipes was native to much of east and mainland southeast Asia, but in recent decades most of these populations have been split off as separate species based on morphological (morphometrics and meristics) and genetic evidence. This limits the native range of definite O. latipes to Japan: eastern and southern Honshu, Shikoku, Kyushu, and smaller southern islands in the country. Formerly included in this species but now regarded as separate are O. sakaizumii in northwestern Honshu in Japan (locally, it hybridizes with O. latipes), and O. sinensis (Chinese rice fish) in much of China, west Korea and parts of mainland southeast Asia. The taxonomic position of certain populations, including some in China, Laos and east Korea, is unclear and require further study. It is possible that all these Chinese populations are part of O. sinensis, but the Laos specimens are relatively large, similar to O. latipes rather than the tiny O. sinensis. The east Korean population is part of a clade with O. sakaizumii and O. latipes. Based on morphology it is closer to O. sakaizumii than O. latipes, but it may be an undescribed species.

Oryzias latipes has been introduced to Hokkaido in northern Japan (where ricefish are not native). There are other reports of introductions around the world, but at least most of those in mainland Asia and Europe involve O. sinensis (Chinese rice fish).

=== Origin of Southern and Northern Japanese populations ===
Phylogenetic analysis shows that the southern Japanese population was derived from that of the northern Kyushu area and spread into Honshu. On the other hand, the northern population was derived from a population from the Tajima-Tango region and spread alongside the Sea of Japan coast. O. latipes is known to have nine sub-populations: East Japanese type, East Setouchi type, West Setouchi type, San'in type, Northern Kyushu type, Osumi Type, Ariake type, Satsuma type and Ryukyu type. These sub-populations have been mixed with each other due to artificial releasing and decreasing local genetic diversity.

=== Origin of domesticated strains ===
Contrary to earlier assumptions, genomic analyses indicate that modern domesticated medaka are not a genetically diverse mixture of multiple wild populations. Instead, domesticated strains appear to represent an isolated evolutionary lineage that has experienced little or no genetic introgression from wild populations. Most domesticated strains are genetically closest to the Southern Japanese medaka population from the Kansai–Setouchi region of west-central Japan. These findings suggest a relatively narrow origin of domestication from a single principal founder lineage, which shows genomic signatures of repeated population bottlenecks.

== Use in science ==
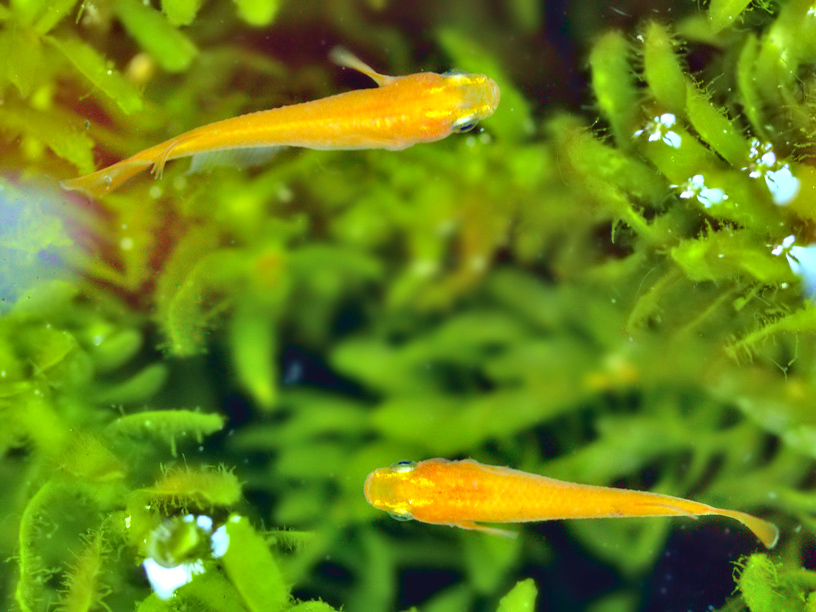
An orange aquarium variant (himedaka) achieved through selective breeding, photographed from above. Not to be confused with the brightly colored transgenic aquarium variants.

Oryzias latipes is a model organism and is extensively used in many areas of biological research, most notably in toxicology. Medaka have a short gestation period, and are reproductively prolific—characteristics that make them easy to rear in the laboratory. They can withstand cold and can be shipped easily. Nearly all aspects of the life cycle of medaka have been analyzed by researchers including sexual behavior, genetic inheritance of coloration, spawning habits, feeding, pathology, embryological development, ecology, etc. It has a relatively small genome (~800 mega base pairs, half the size of the genome of another popular model fish, the zebrafish) as well as a generation time of 7 weeks (rather than 9 weeks for zebrafish) and hardier growth in a broad temperature range (6–40 °C or 43–104 °F).

Transgenic medaka are relatively easy to produce. They have been genetically modified to secrete various human hormones, express promoter sequences from other fish, and to make antimicrobial proteins and a protein that makes the medaka glow fluorescent green, yellow or red. There are also many mutations that show up in medaka at random, for example, a mutant strain that lacks scales, and one with extra-long fins. Haploid embryonic stem cell lines have been established.

=== In space ===
O. latipes mating in space

Oryzias latipes carries the distinction of having been the first recorded vertebrate to mate in orbit. The result of the mating was a brood of healthy fry, hatched on the Space Shuttle Columbia in 1994. O. latipes returned to space in 2012, launched aboard a Soyuz spacecraft Soyuz TMA-06M and housed in an aquarium aboard the International Space Station.

=== Inbreeding lines ===
The possibility of serial inbreeding facilitates genetic research due to reduction of heterozygous sites in the genome. In medaka it is relatively easy to establish inbred lines, unlike other model species like zebrafish and mice. By 1979, researchers had generated 10 inbred strains. These inbred lines made medaka a model species for scientific research in genetics. In 2014, work began on generating 111 different inbred lines derived from a single population collected in the wild.

=== Sex and reproduction ===
Medaka reproduce on a daily basis, which is an optimal trait for studying their reproductive biology. Researchers have studied HPG axis activities intensively in this species. Moreover, the medaka is the first non-mammalian vertebrate species for which a sex-determination gene (DMY) has been identified, their sex is reversible by sex steroid manipulation, and they exhibit morphological sexual dimorphism between males and females. Furthermore, some methods such as ovariectomy and altered light-dark cycles have been developed to study the mechanism of reproduction in medaka.

=== Immunology ===
The discovery that T-lymphocytes home to the thymus in medaka has led to an understanding that this is not specific to mammalians but can be found in other vertebrates.

=== Skeletal research ===
This species is increasingly used as a model in research relating to skeletal diseases in humans, such as osteoporosis.

== Conservation ==
=== Status ===
The medaka is listed as a least-concern species in the IUCN red list. The justification of this categorization is that this species is living in widespread habitat (755,000 km^{2}) and is relatively abundant in its various habitats. However, it is considered an endangered species by Japan's Ministry of the Environment. Many local communities try to preserve wild medaka in Japan.

=== Concerns ===
There are two major concerns about medaka conservation: habitat degradation and hybridization with domesticated medaka (himedaka). Due to modernization of rice fields and irrigation canals, optimal places for medaka reproduction are massively decreasing. In addition, recent studies confirmed that himedaka have been introduced into many local regions by artificial release. This will eliminate local genetic adaptations of each sub-population of medaka. Furthermore, since himedaka have vivid orange body color, the hybrids will attract more predators and thus decrease the total medaka population. In 2011, researchers discovered that almost 15% of wild-caught medaka in Nara had a himedaka-specific gene marker. In addition to these concerns, invasive species like mosquitofish compete with medaka by sharing the same habitat. A study reported that over 70% of medaka had their tail fins injured by attacks from mosquitofish. The damage at the anal fin will decrease medaka offspring by preventing courtship behavior. In 2006, it was found that a transgenic line of medaka was brought to Japan from Taiwan for commercial purposes. This transgenic line had an introduced gene which expresses green fluorescence, making the body glow. Now, this transgenic line has been released into the wild and is causing genetic pollution. There is no comprehensive study of population size of medaka, but the genomic analysis of one medaka sub-population indicates that their effective population size is around 25000–70000.

== Social importance in Japan ==
Medaka in Tokyo, Japan

The medaka has been kept as a domesticated pet in Japan for centuries. In recent years the fish has gained further popularity, with some rarer breeds valued at over 1 million yen (approximately US$10,000)—though the most common varieties (like himedaka) can be purchased for around 50 yen per fish. Currently, 456 commercial strains are documented and available for fishkeeping. Medaka are not only kept as pets but also widely utilized in education; Japanese elementary school classes often raise medaka in order to give the students firsthand experience with caring for live organisms, as well as to foster more broad appreciation for animals' life cycles.

== See also ==
- Mummichog (Fundulus heteroclitus), first fish sent to space in 1973
