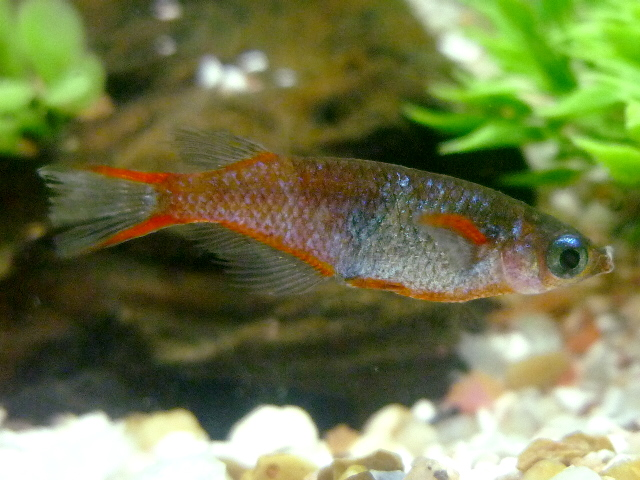
- Oryzias woworae

Scientific classification
- Kingdom: Animalia
- Phylum: Chordata
- Class: Actinopterygii
- Division: Teleostei
- Order: Beloniformes
- Suborder: Adrianichthyoidei
- Family: Adrianichthyidae; M. C. W. Weber, 1913

Subfamilies and genera
- Subfamily Adrianichthyinae Weber, 1913: Adrianichthys Weber, 1913; Subfamily Oryziinae Myers, 1938: Oryzias D.S. Jordan & Snyder, 1906

= Ricefish =

Ricefish Temporal range: Miocene–present

Family of fishes

The ricefishes are a family (Adrianichthyidae) of small ray-finned fish that are found in fresh and brackish waters from India to Japan and out into the Malay Archipelago, most notably Sulawesi (where the Lake Poso and Lore Lindu species are known as buntingi). The common name ricefish derives from the fact that some species are found in rice paddies. This family consists of about 37 species in two genera (some recognize a third, Xenopoecilus). Several species are rare and threatened, and some 2–4 may already be extinct.

The fossil genus †Lithopoecilus de Beaufort, 1934 from the Miocene of Sulawesi may potentially represent a prehistoric member of the family, although it is only tentatively placed within it. It appears to be intermediate in size between Oryzias and Adrianichthys.

== Description ==
Most of these species are quite small, making them of interest for aquaria. Adrianichthys reach lengths of 8.5–17.1 cm (3.3–6.7 in) depending on the exact species involved, while the largest Oryzias reaches up to 8 cm (3.1 in). Most Oryzias species are less than a half this length, with the smallest being up to only 1.6 cm (0.63 in) long. They have a number of distinctive features, including an unusual structure to the jaw, and the presence of an additional bone in the tail. The Japanese rice fish (O. latipes), also known as the medaka, is a popular model organism used in research in developmental biology. This species has traveled into space, where they have the distinction of being the first vertebrate to mate and produce healthy young in space.

Molecular phylogenetic studies suggests that it originated in India, and that the diversity found on the island of Sulawesi forms a single lineage. It has also been suggested that not only the species formerly classified in the genus Xenopoecilus, but also those in the genus Adrianichthys, evolved through speciation from species of the genus Oryzias.

== Taxonomy ==
The ricefish were formerly classified within the order Cyprinodontiformes but in the 1980s workers showed that they were a monophyletic grouping, mainly based on the characters on the bones of the gill arches and the hyoid apparatus, within the Beloniformes as the family Adrianichthyidae, this family making up one of the three suborders of the Beloniformes, the Adrianichthyoidei. Since then some workers have placed them in the Cyprinodontiformes but more recently molecular studies have supported their placement in the Beloniformes.

== History ==
Ricefish are believed to have been kept as aquarium fishes since the 17th century. The Japanese ricefish was one of the first species to be kept and it has been bred into a golden color, from their original white coloring.

== Reproduction ==
As with most fish, ricefish typically spawn their eggs, which are fertilised externally. However, some species, including the Japanese ricefish, are known to fertilise the eggs internally, carrying them inside the body as the embryo develops. The female then lays the eggs just before they hatch. Several other species carry their eggs attached to the body between their pelvic fins.

== Sources ==
- Froese, Rainer; Pauly, Daniel (eds.). "Family Adrianichthyidae". FishBase. November 2008 version.
- Takehana, Yusuke; Naruse, Kiyoshi; Sakaizumi, Mitsuru (2005). "Molecular phylogeny of the medaka fishes genus Oryzias (Beloniformes: Adrianichthyidae) based on nuclear and mitochondrial DNA sequences". Molecular Phylogenetics and Evolution. 36 (2): 417–428. Bibcode:2005MolPE..36..417T. doi:10.1016/j.ympev.2005.01.016. PMID 15955519.
