= Pompano (disambiguation) =

Pompano is a common name for fish in the genus Trachinotus

Pompano may also refer to:

- Trachinotus ovatus, a species of fish referred to by the same name.
- Pompano Beach, Florida, a city
- USS Pompano, three US naval boats:
  - USS Pompano (1906), a supply boat serving during World War I
  - USS Pompano (SS-181), an infamously mechanically unreliable submarine, lost during World War II
  - USS Pompano (SS-491), a submarine, whose construction began late in World War II but was cancelled before completion
