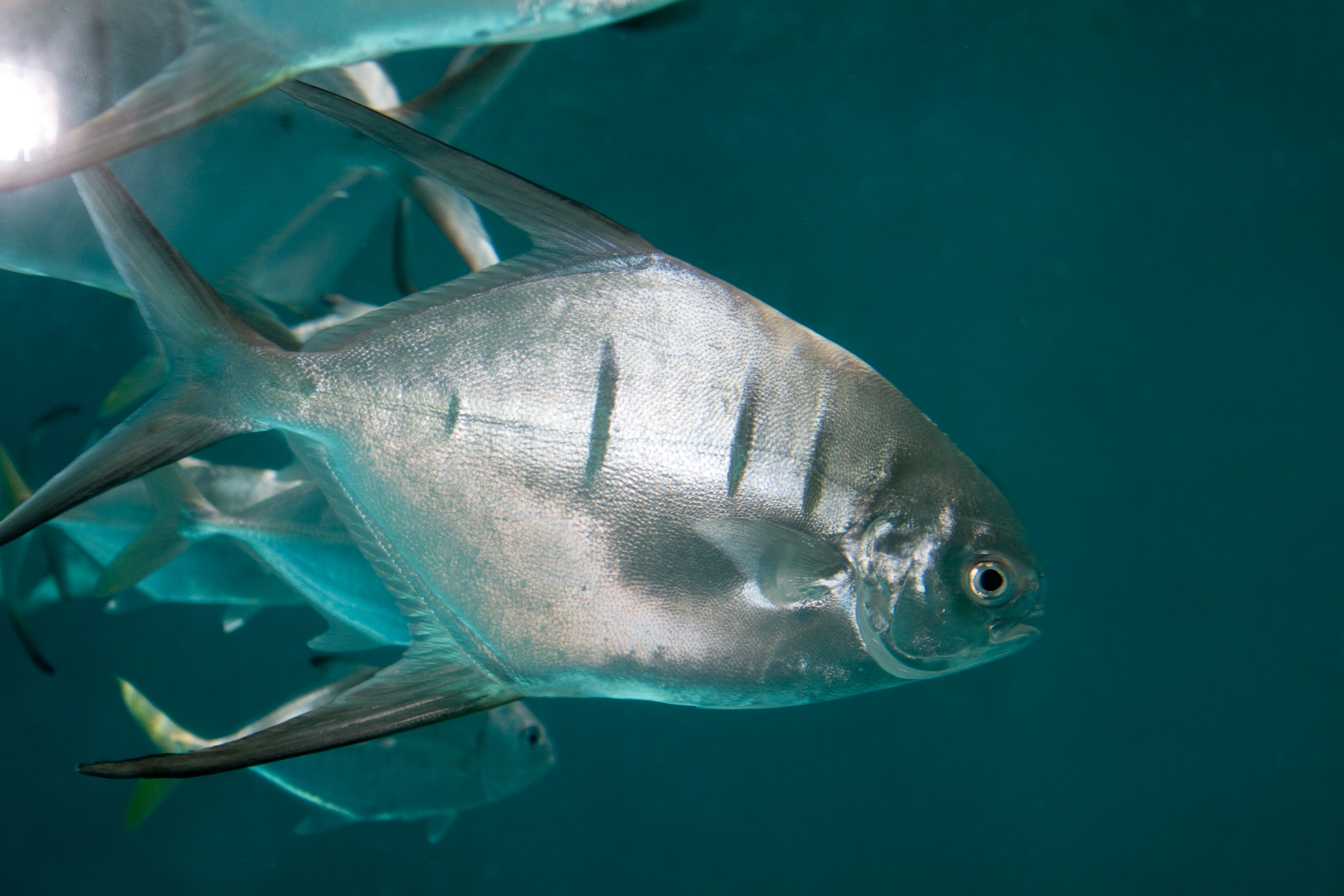

Conservation status
- Least Concern (IUCN 3.1)

Scientific classification
- Kingdom: Animalia
- Phylum: Chordata
- Class: Actinopterygii
- Order: Carangiformes
- Suborder: Carangoidei
- Family: Trachinotidae
- Genus: Trachinotus
- Species: T. goodei

Binomial name
- Trachinotus goodei D. S. Jordan & Evermann, 1896

= Trachinotus goodei =

Species of ray-finned fish

Trachinotus goodei, the palometa, is an ocean-going game fish of the family Trachinotidae. Other common names include banner pompano, camade fish, cobbler, gafftopsail, great pompano, joefish, longfin pompano, old wife, sand mackerel, streamers jack, wireback. This fish is native to the western Atlantic Ocean from Massachusetts to Bermuda to Argentina. It can be found in the Gulf of Mexico and the Caribbean Sea.

== Etymology ==
The specific name of this fish honors the American ichthyologist George Brown Goode (1851-1896), who was assistant secretary of the Smithsonian Institution and who was the first to note the presence of this species in the waters of the United States.

== Description ==
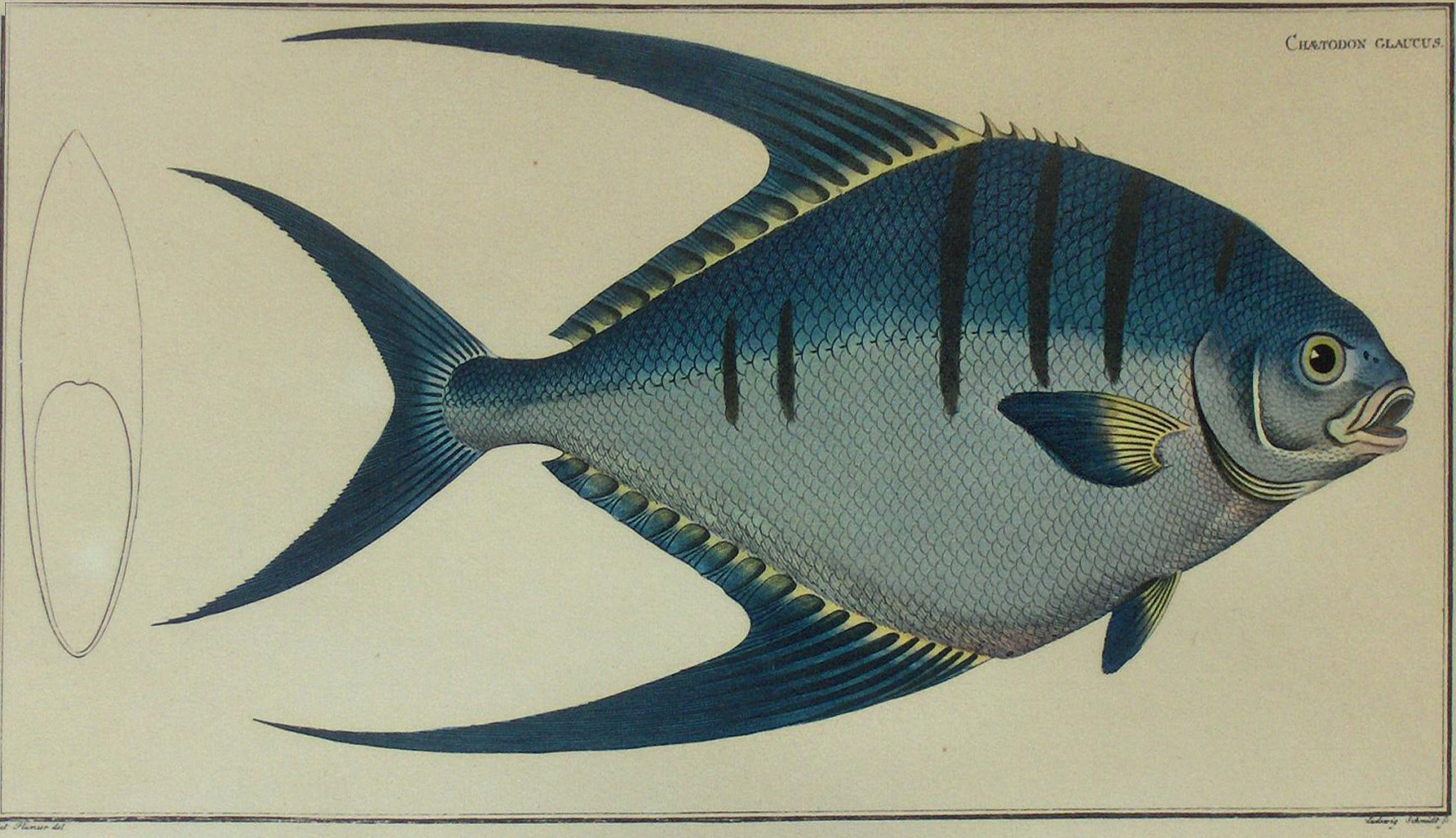
An early anatomical drawing of a Palometa.

The palometa is best recognized by its elongated dorsal and anal fins with dark anterior lobes. The dorsal fin usually has seven or eight spines and 19-20 soft rays, while the anal fin has two or three spines and 16-18 soft rays.

Its coloration varies from gray to blue-green on the top of its head, and the sides are silver with four narrow, vertical bars. A faint fifth bar shows near the base of the tail. The breast usually has an orange tinge. The tail has no scutes, unlike many members of its family.

The largest known palometa was 50 cm (1 ft 8 in) long. The heaviest was 560 g (1 lb 4 oz).

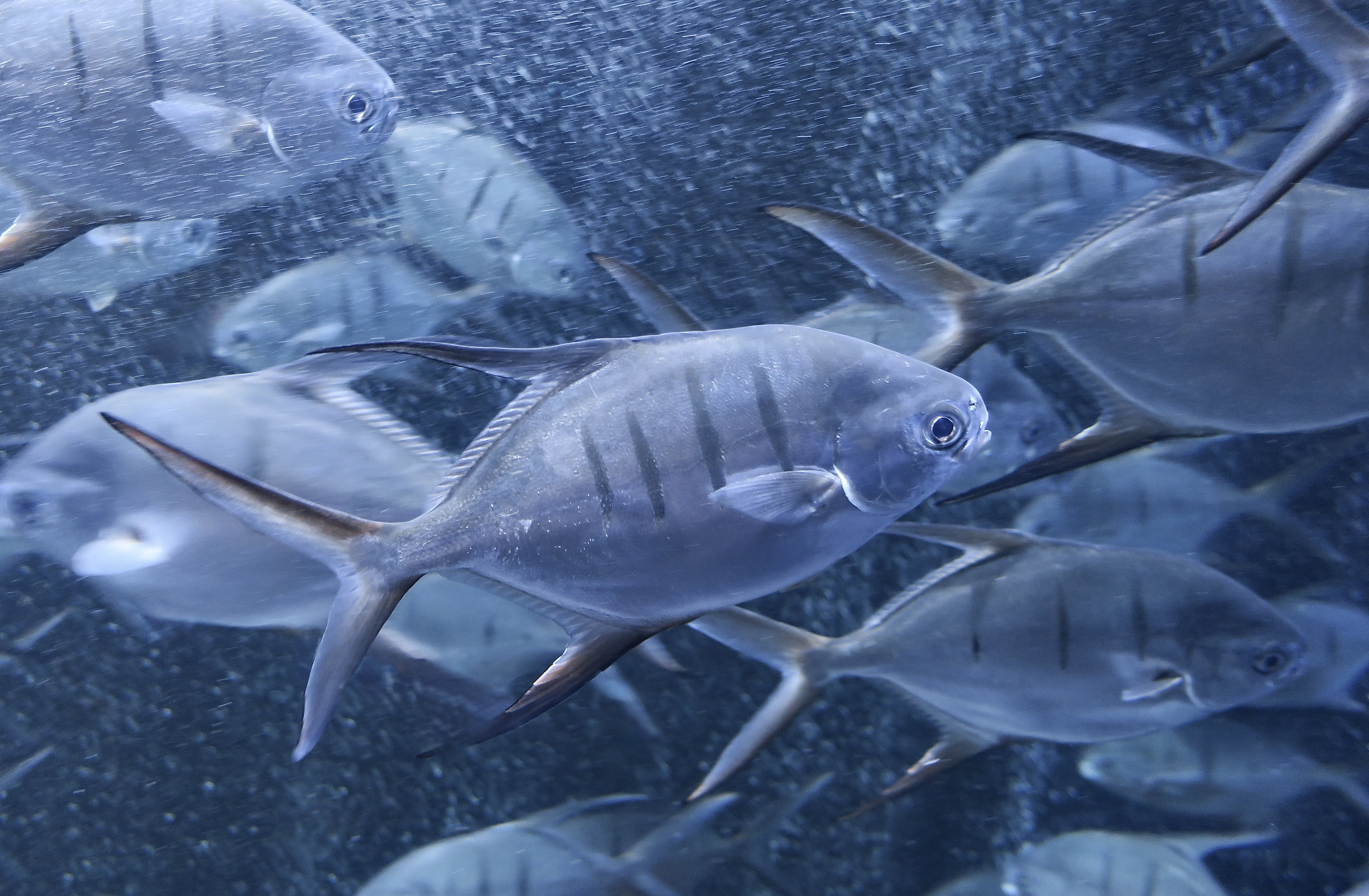
Palometa schooling at OdySea Aquarium.

== Biology ==
The palometa prefers clear, tropical water in sandy shores and bays. It may school above coral reefs.

Little is known about the reproduction of the palometa. It is thought to spawn far offshore during all seasons except winter. Juveniles have shown high growth rates in maricultural experiments.

In the wild, the palometa eats worms, insect pupae, and smaller fish.

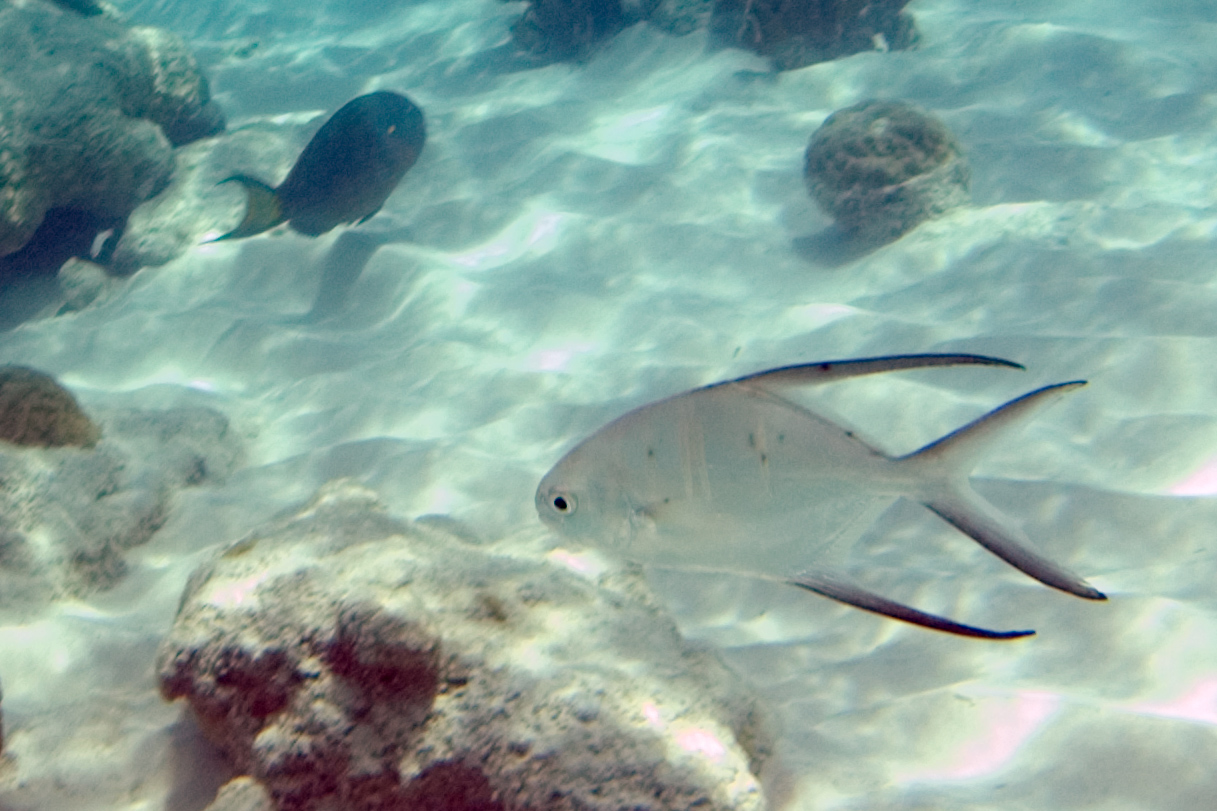
A palometa seen off the coast of Bonaire

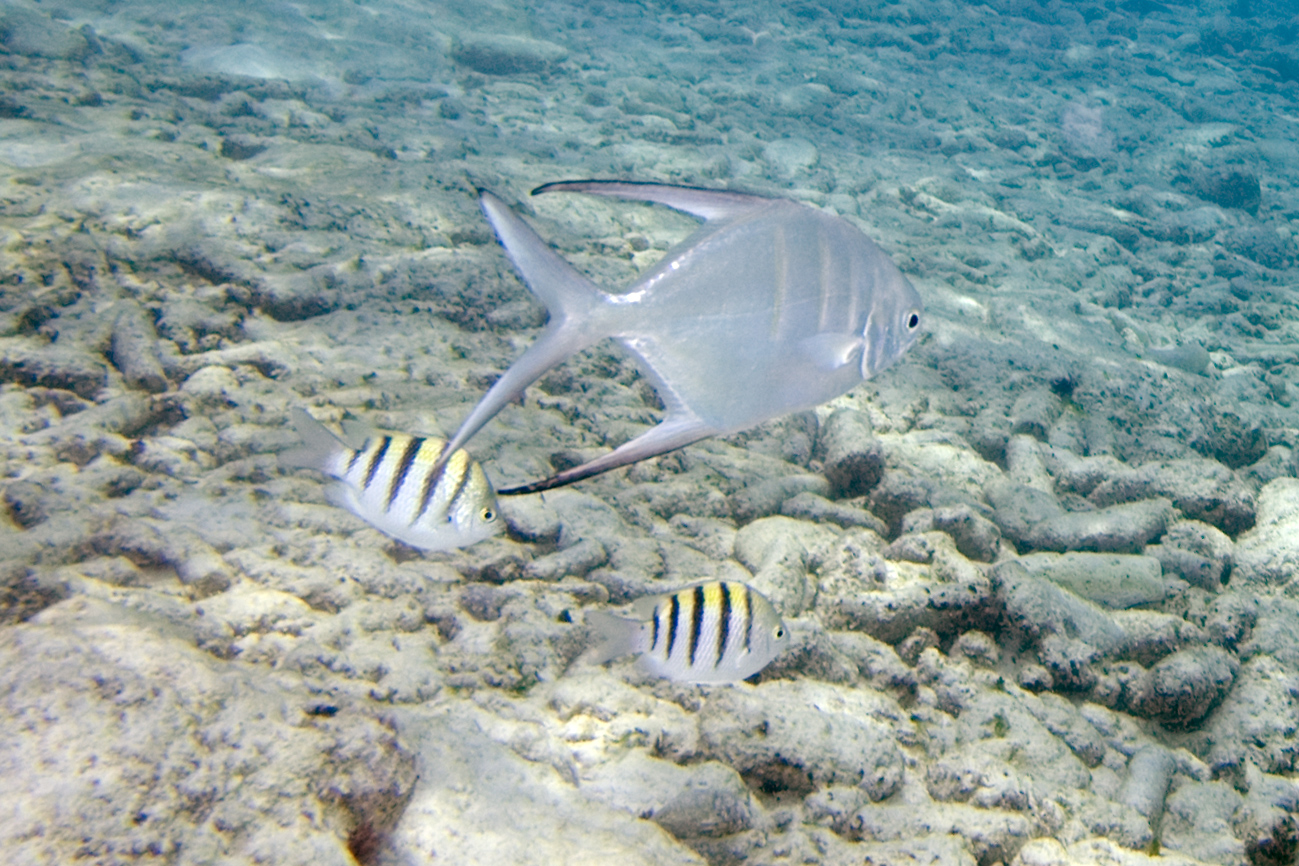
Another palometa, swimming with a sergeant major (Abudefduf saxatilis)

== Relationship with humans ==
Though there have been reports of ciguatera poisoning, the palometa is considered primarily a game fish. Although it is used in aquaculture, few are captured for the aquarium trade. In a review of aquarium fish from Ceará in Brazil, only two palometa were exported between 1995 and 2000, both from Fortaleza. It is rarely used for any other purpose than as a gamefish.

Bathers cooling off in the Parana River in Rosario, 300 kilometres (190 mi) north of Buenos Aires, Argentina on Christmas Day 2013 were attacked by a fish they called 'palometa'. Up to 70 people were bitten, some even losing toes and fingers. The actual species claimed to be responsible for the attack was a type of piranha, as 'palometa' is a general common name used for many species of serrasalmids (including several piranhas) in South America.

Palometa, Trachinotus goodei, have been farm raised from eggs by Proaquatix, a fish farm in Florida. They are of commercial interest as an ornamental species for large displays and public aquariums.

== See also ==
- Florida pompano
- Permit
- George Brown Goode
