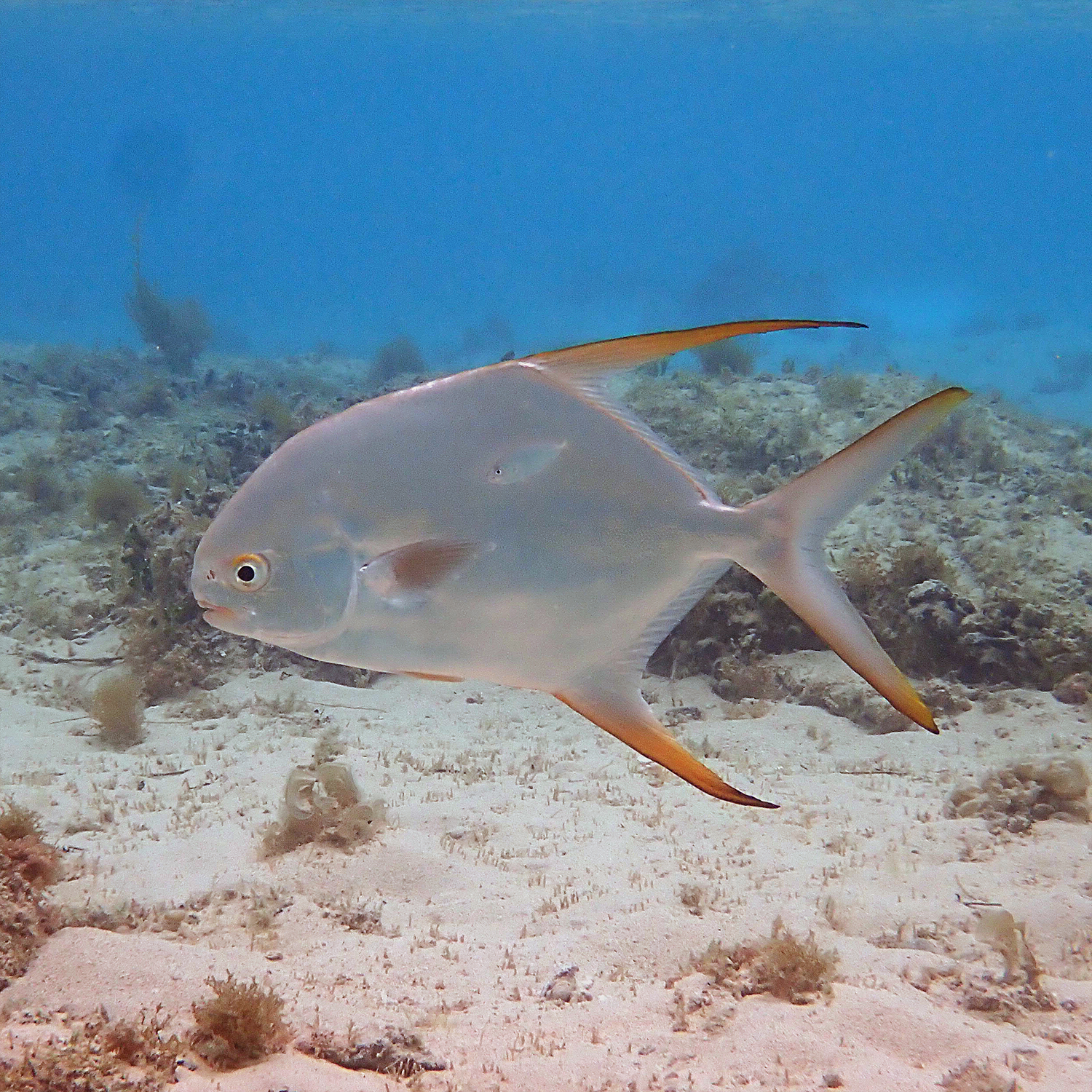

Conservation status
- Least Concern (IUCN 3.1)

Scientific classification
- Kingdom: Animalia
- Phylum: Chordata
- Class: Actinopterygii
- Order: Carangiformes
- Suborder: Carangoidei
- Family: Trachinotidae
- Genus: Trachinotus
- Species: T. blochii

Binomial name
- Trachinotus blochii (Lacépède, 1801)

= Trachinotus blochii =

Snubnose pompano

Species of ray-finned fish

Trachinotus blochii, also called the snubnose dart, golden pompano, and golden pomfret, is an Asia-Pacific species of pompano in the family Trachinotidae. It is a pelagic fish associated with rocky reefs, coral reefs as well as inshore habitats.

Other common names include buck-nosed trevally, dart, oyster cracker, snub-nosed dart, and snub-nosed swallow tail.

== Geographic range ==
T. blochii is found from the Indian Ocean, the Red Sea and eastern Africa to the central Pacific Ocean. This range includes northern Japan and as far south as the coast of southern New South Wales.

== Habitat ==
The golden pompano are pelagic fish associated with rocky reefs, coral reefs, as well as in shore habitats. It is found in warm waters between 25–29°C. Its depth range is 7–55 m (23–180 ft). It lives in brackish waters.

== Description ==
The fish body shape can be described as fusiform body plane. The shape is streamlined or torpedo resemblance.

The body is also elongated helping to reduce drag as it is a burst swimmer. This is an adaptation to evade predators. Another adaptation it has to escape predators is the coloration, the dorsal side is darker to camouflage into the environment if predated from above. Likewise, it is lighter in color on the ventral, or abdominal, side to blend into the environment if predated from below. Its colouration is yellow hence the common names referring to it as "golden".

Females are typically larger than the males, with one study finding them to be 17% larger than males after reaching 7 months of age. The length of the fish is between 40–65 cm (16–26 in). It typically weighs 3.4 kg (7.5 lb). It is metabolically active and continuously swims thus requiring a high energy diet.

== Behavior ecology ==
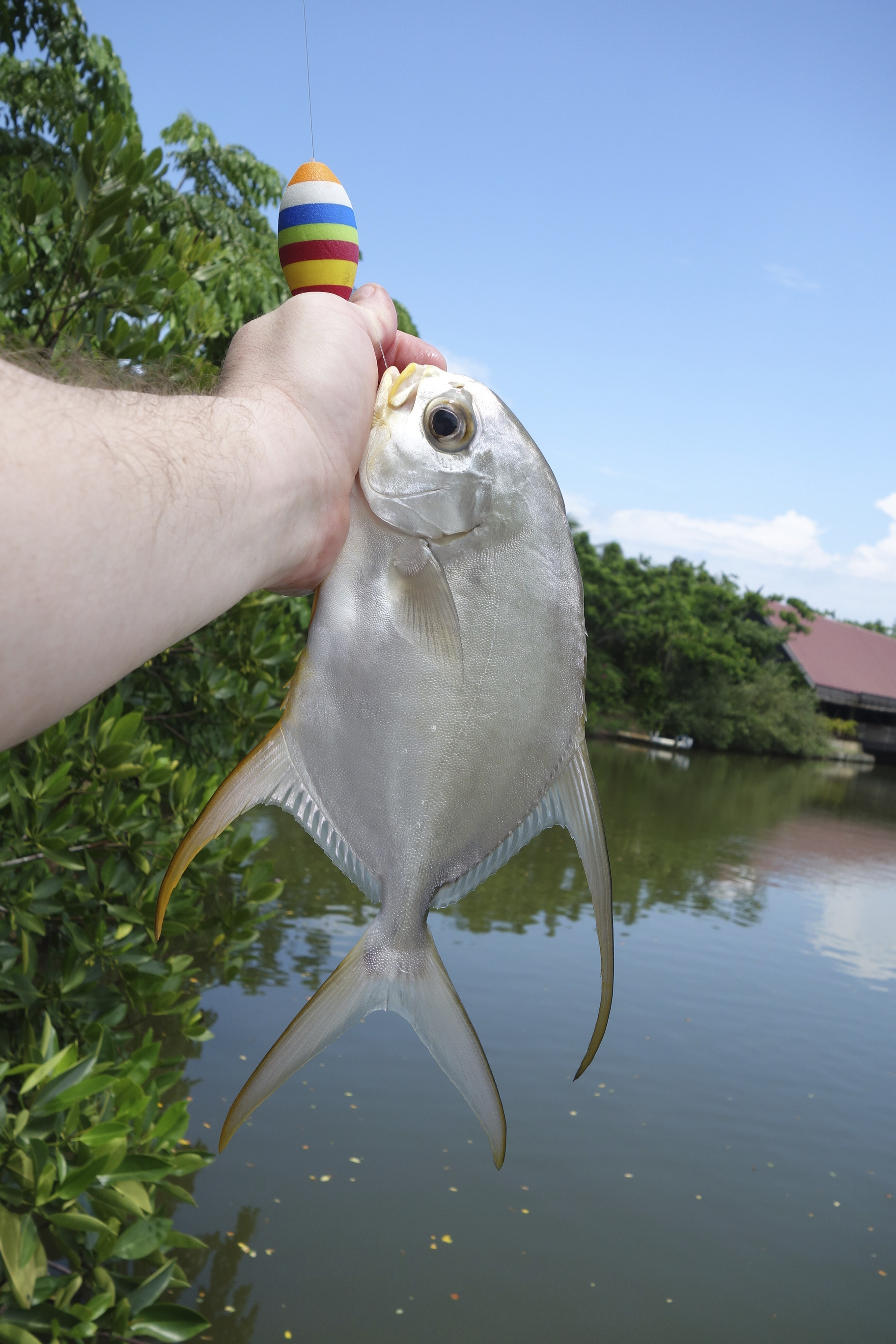
Anatomical features

=== Social behavior ===
Juvenile pompano live in small schools, or groups, until they reach maturation. Adults are solitary.

=== Reproduction ===
The male and females are sexually dimorphic. Males and females have similar colors. However, they have different growth rates. Females typically mature and grow quicker than the males.

The life cycle begins with a female laying eggs in the offshore. The eggs are about 1 mm (0.039 in) in diameter. Typically, they hatch within 24 hours. Metamorphism happens as they begin to lose the larvae shape in growing into their juvenile states. This takes about 15 days to complete. Juveniles can be found offshore in sandy areas.

=== Diet ===
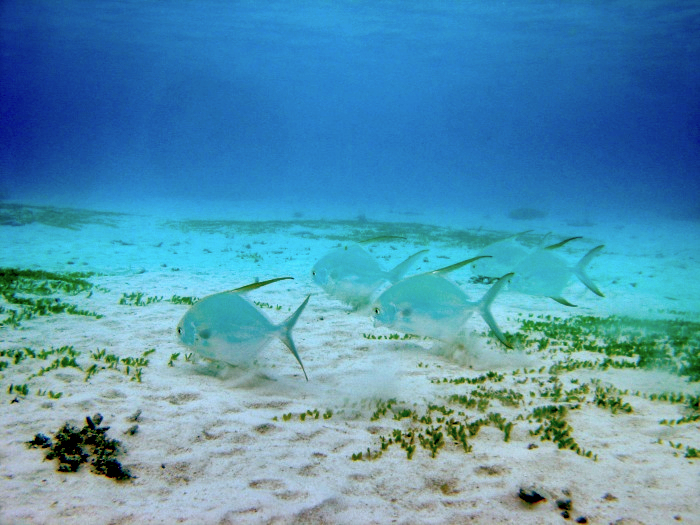
Benthic feeding

The golden pompano has specialized pharyngeal plates designed to crush food such as shrimp, bivalves, etc. They are benthic feeders meaning that they feed on bottom dwellers. Their diet consists of proteins and fats essential to providing energy for their highly energetic lifestyle due to continuous swimming. Their digestive tract is one of the shortest among similar species of fish thus suggesting more frequent feedings increases the growth rate of the fish. During the larvae stage of life, they feed on zooplankton. As they reach adulthood, they feed primarily on invertebrates.

=== Human interaction ===
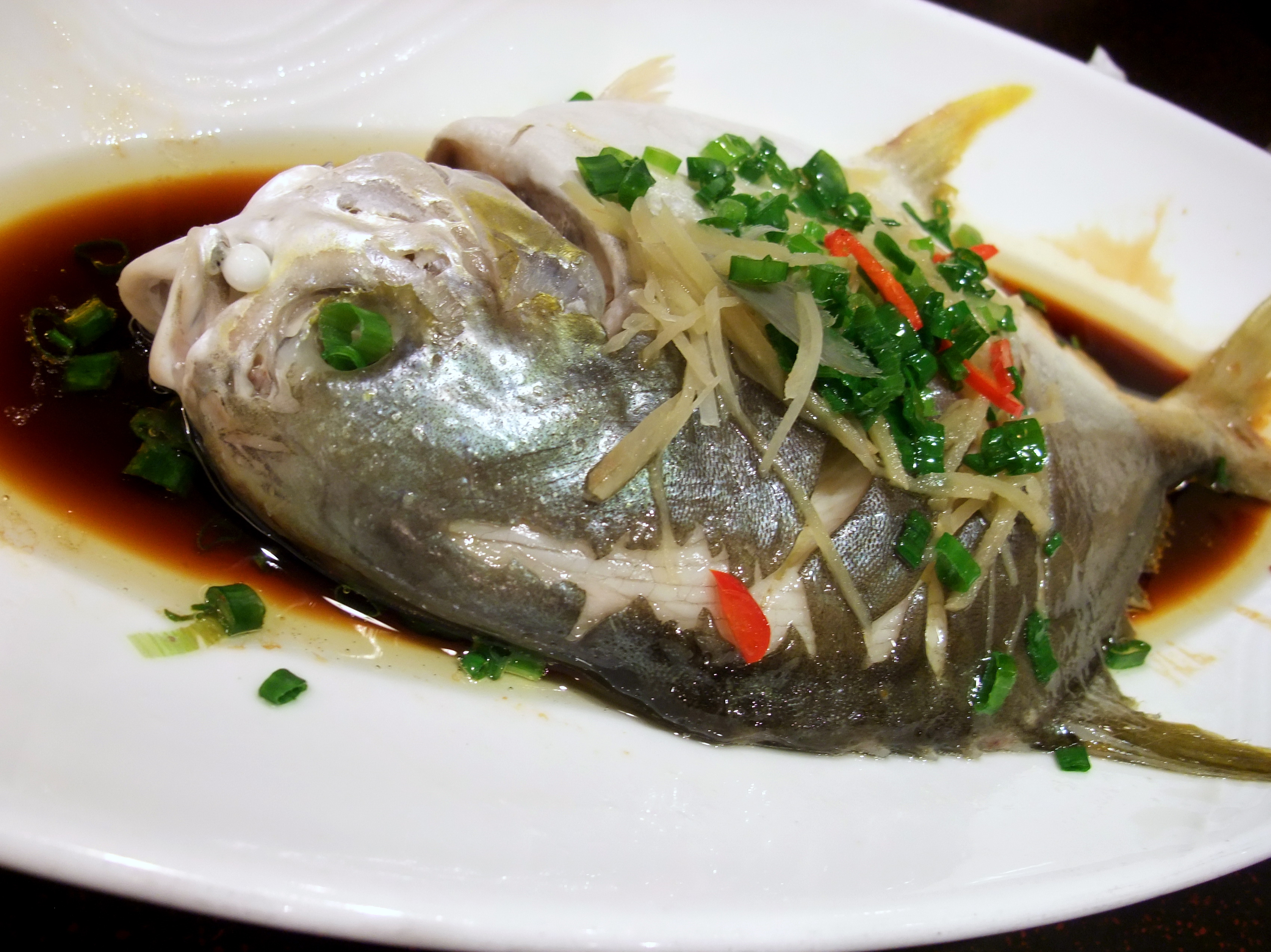
Steamed pompano in soy sauce

Golden pompano are a very nutritious and highly sought after food. The fish is commonly consumed in China and Taiwan, where it is known as jīnchāng (金鯧). Consumer demand is high although the wild supply of them is low. Research is currently being conducted to increase hatchery fish survivability. Aquaculture has successfully been established in China, Taiwan, and Indonesia. As of 2023, T. blochii was the second-most maricultured fish in China.

== Conservation status ==
T. blochii and four other Trachinotus species (T. anak, T. mookalee, T. goreenisi, T. ovatus) are predicted to expand their geographic range further into the coasts of China. These species are categorised as Least Concern (LC) on the IUCN Red List.

However, the disease nocardiosis threatens the population. Nocardiosis is a bacterial infection. Symptoms includes visible lesions and eroding skin. Degradation of the gills can be apparent. Immunocompromised people could catch the bacteria and become ill. They can show respiratory symptoms similar to colds such as cough, hard time breathing etc.

In addition, human harvesting and consumption rates could affect populations however as of 2016, there is no evidence of population decline.
