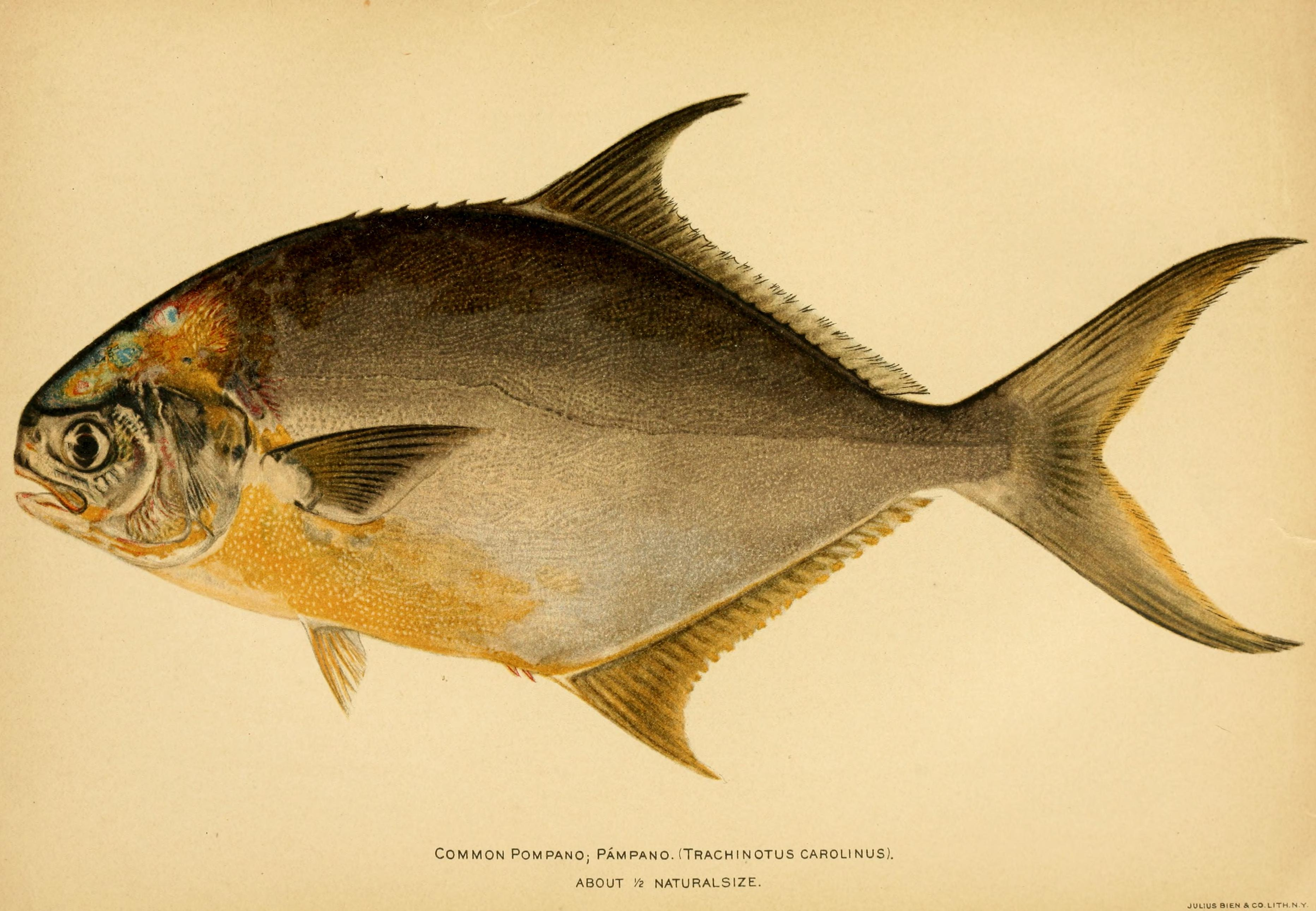

Conservation status
- Least Concern (IUCN 3.1)

Scientific classification
- Kingdom: Animalia
- Phylum: Chordata
- Class: Actinopterygii
- Division: Teleostei
- Order: Carangiformes
- Suborder: Carangoidei
- Family: Trachinotidae
- Genus: Trachinotus
- Species: T. carolinus

Binomial name
- Trachinotus carolinus (Linnaeus, 1766)

Synonyms
- Gasterosteus carolinus Linnaeus, 1766

= Florida pompano =

Species of ray-finned fish

The Florida pompano (Trachinotus carolinus) is a species of marine fish in the Trachinotus (pompano) genus of the family Trachinotidae. It has a compressed body and short snout; coloration varies from blue-greenish silver on the dorsal areas and silver to yellow on the body and fins. It can be found along the western coast of the Atlantic Ocean, depending on the season, and is popular for both sport and commercial fishing. Most Florida pompano caught weigh less than 3 lb (1.4 kg) and are less than 17 in (43 cm) long, though the largest individuals weigh 8–9 lb (3.6–4.1 kg) and reach lengths up to 26 in (66 cm).

Because it is fast-growing and desirable for food, the pompano is one of the many fish that is currently being farmed through aquaculture.

The Florida city of Pompano Beach is named after the Florida pompano.

== Description ==
The different kinds of pompano include African, Cayenne, and Florida. The Florida pompano (T. carolinus) is part of the jack family. It is very similar to the permit (Trachinotus falcatus). It has a deeply forked tail and is blue-greenish silver with yellow on the throat, belly, and pelvic and anal fins. The first dorsal fins are low, with about six separate spines. The first spine may be reabsorbed in a larger fish. The second lobes on the dorsal and anal fins have a lower anterior. There are 20-24 anal fin rays. It is a compressed fish with a deep body and a blunt snout.

== Size ==
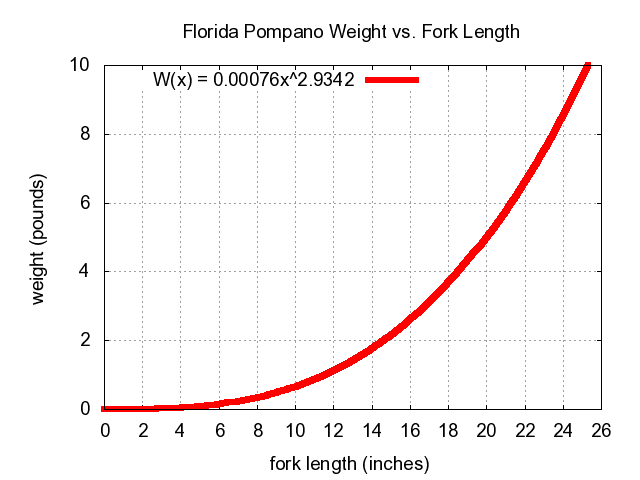

Juvenile pompano grow between 0.8 and 1.9 in (20 and 48 mm) per month, depending on the population. Pompano grow quickly and attain a length of about 12 in (30 cm) and a weight of about 1 lb (0.45 kg) after the first year. The relationship between total length (L, in inches) and total weight (W, in pounds) for nearly all fish can be expressed by an equation of the form: $W = cL^b\!\,$

Invariably, b is close to 3.0 for all species, and c is a constant that varies among species. A weight-length relationship was determined for a sample of 1,984 Florida pompano collected along the Gulf Coast of Florida between 2000 and 2002. The fish sampled ranged in length from 79 to 481 mm (3.16-19.24 in). For this sample of Florida pompano, b = 2.9342 and c = 0.00076.

This relationship predicts that a 12-inch (300 mm) pompano will weigh about a pound. Most are less than three pounds when caught, though the largest pompano recorded have weighed 8-9 lb and were 23–25 in long.

== Lifespan ==
The Florida pompano usually survives for only about three to four years, although individuals as old as 6-7 yr have been caught.

== Range and habitat ==
The adult Florida pompano is typically found in more saline areas and relatively warm waters (70-89 °F), so it migrates northward in the summer, and toward the south in the fall. Despite its name, the range of the Florida pompano extends from Massachusetts to Brazil, but it is more common in areas near Florida. During the summer, it can be found near Sebastian, Cape Hatteras, and the Gulf of Mexico. It is more common near oil rigs, Palm Beach, and Hobe Sound during the winter. It can also be found near the Virgin Islands year round.

Its habitat is surf flats, and it tends to stay away from clear water regions, such as the Bahamas. Pompanos are very fast swimmers and live in schools. They are bottom feeders. They have very short teeth and feed on zoobenthos and small clams.

== Relationship with humans ==
=== Food ===
The pompano is a popular food fish. Chefs like it because the fillets are of even thickness, which aids in cooking. A popular dish created in New Orleans, called "pompano en papillote," is wrapped in parchment paper with a white sauce of wine, shrimp, and crabmeat, and then steamed.

The pompano's flesh is oily and looks white and opaque. Its diet yields a rich but mild flavor. Fresh fillets can cost $17 or more. Demand has encouraged the use of aquaculture to increase supply.

=== Aquaculture ===
The Florida pompano is a popular choice for aquaculture because it is such a popular food and sport fish and is in high demand, and at the same time it has a fast growth rate, high dockside prices, and a tolerance for low-salinity waters. The typical market size of farm-raised pompano is 1 to 1.5 lb (0.45 to 0.68 kg).

=== Fishing ===
The pompano supports an important commercial and recreational fishery. Florida pompano are commercially fished in all states on the East Coast from Virginia to Texas, with Florida producing over 90% of the annual harvest. Harvesting occurs mostly along Florida's western coast, with some harvesting on the eastern coast and in the Banana and Indian Rivers. Between 1994 and 2006, it commanded dockside prices of more than $3 per pound of whole fish weight.

Individually, Florida pompano are caught on light jigs and popping corks. They are very active on the line, testing light tackle beyond what their weight would suggest. They bite near oil rigs in the winter.

From 1997 to 2000, the fishing mortality rates increased sharply. However, an extensive study by the Florida Fish and Wildlife Conservation Commission concluded, as of 2005, the population of Florida pompano was healthy and the fishery was sustainable with current practices.

== See also ==
- List of fish species in Florida
