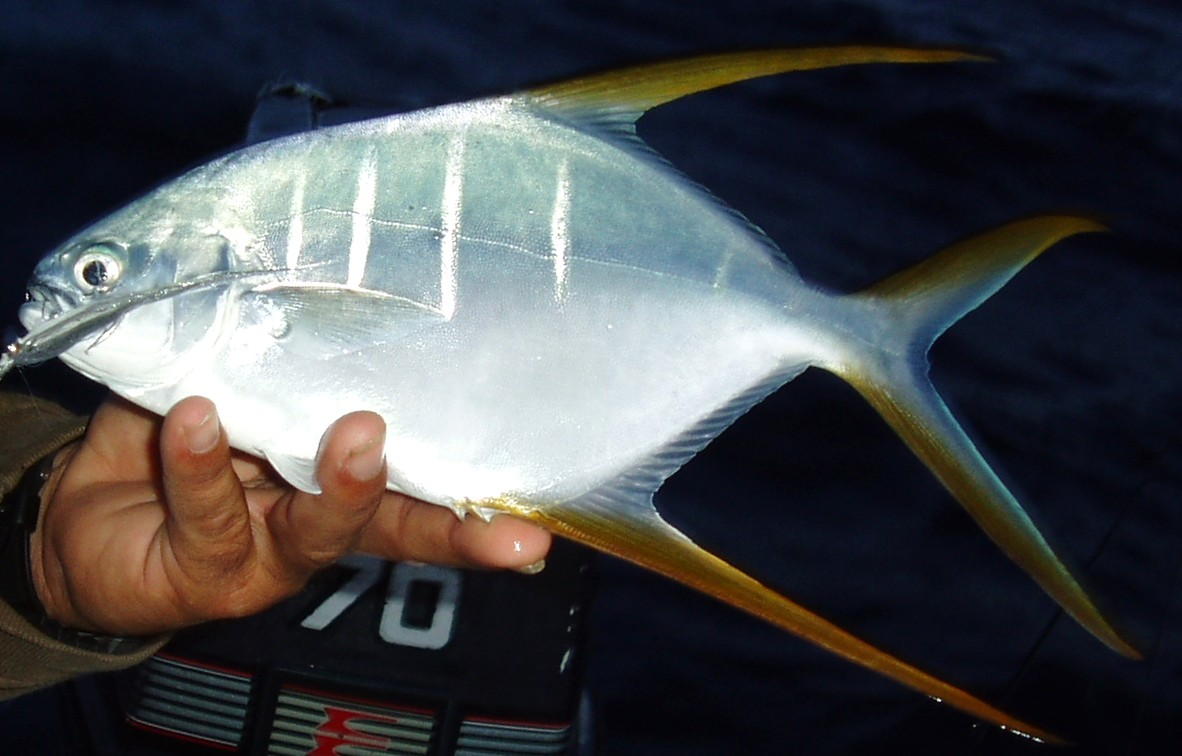

Conservation status
- Least Concern (IUCN 3.1)

Scientific classification
- Kingdom: Animalia
- Phylum: Chordata
- Class: Actinopterygii
- Order: Carangiformes
- Suborder: Carangoidei
- Family: Trachinotidae
- Genus: Trachinotus
- Species: T. rhodopus

Binomial name
- Trachinotus rhodopus T. N. Gill, 1863

= Trachinotus rhodopus =

Species of ray-finned fish

The gafftopsail pompano (Trachinotus rhodopus) is a species of ray-finned fish in the family Trachinotidae. It is found in the eastern Pacific.

== Distribution and habitat ==
Gafftopsail pompanos are found in the eastern Pacific. Their range extends from Zuma Beach in southern California to Peru and the Galapagos Islands. They are more common around the Gulf of California and Peru.

== Description ==
The maximum size for this fish is 61 centimetres (24 in) but usually grows up to 25 centimetres (9.8 in). It is diamond shaped with yellow fins. The colouration of this fish is silver.

== Ecology ==
=== Diet ===
Trachinotus rhodopus feeds on invertebrates and fish.
