= Golden pomfret =

Golden pomfret may refer to:

- Trachinotus blochii, an edible pompano fish
- Xenobrama microlepis, a rare pomfret from the subantarctic Pacific Ocean
