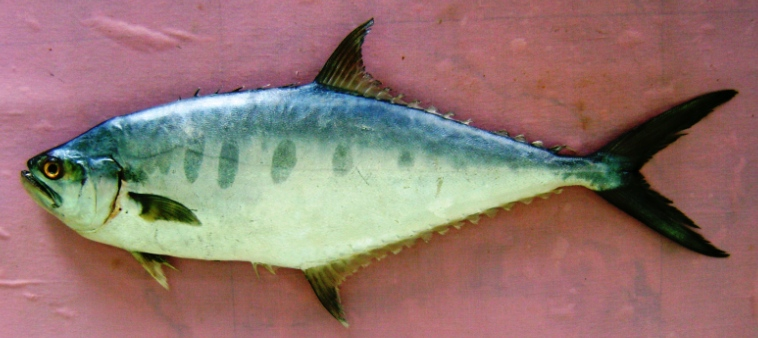

Conservation status
- Least Concern (IUCN 3.1)

Scientific classification
- Kingdom: Animalia
- Phylum: Chordata
- Class: Actinopterygii
- Order: Carangiformes
- Suborder: Carangoidei
- Family: Trachinotidae
- Genus: Scomberoides
- Species: S. tala

Binomial name
- Scomberoides tala (Cuvier, 1832)

Synonyms
- Chorinemus tala Cuvier, 1832; Chorinemus hainanensis Chu & Cheng, 1958; Scomberoides hainanensis (Chu & Cheng, 1958)

= Barred queenfish =

Species of ray-finned fish

The barred queenfish (Scomberoides tala), also known as deep queenfish or deep leatherjacket, is a species of ray-finned fish in the family Trachinotidae, the pompanos and related fishes. It is found in the eastern Indian Ocean and western Pacific Ocean.
