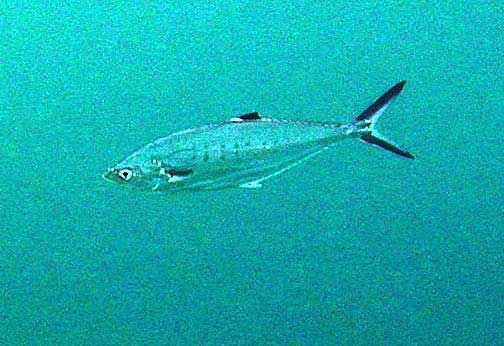

Conservation status
- Least Concern (IUCN 3.1)

Scientific classification
- Kingdom: Animalia
- Phylum: Chordata
- Class: Actinopterygii
- Order: Carangiformes
- Suborder: Carangoidei
- Family: Trachinotidae
- Genus: Scomberoides
- Species: S. lysan

Binomial name
- Scomberoides lysan (Forsskål, 1775)

Synonyms
- Scomber lysan Forsskål, 1775; Chorinemus lysan (Forsskål, 1775); Lichia lysan (Forsskål, 1775); Scomber forsteri Schneider & Forster, 1801; Lichia tolooparah Rüppell, 1829; Chorinemus tolooparah (Rüppell, 1829); Scomberoides tolooparah (Rüppell, 1829); Chorinemus sanctipetri Cuvier, 1832; Scomberoides sanctipetri (Cuvier, 1832); Chorinemus moadetta Cuvier, 1832; Scomberoides moadetta (Cuvier, 1832); Chorinemus mauritianus Cuvier, 1832; Chorinemus orientalis Temminck & Schlegel, 1844; Scomberoides orientalis (Temminck & Schlegel, 1844)

= Doublespotted queenfish =

Species of ray-finned fish

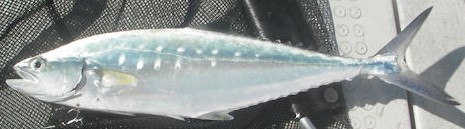
Doublespotted queenfish

The doublespotted queenfish (Scomberoides lysan) is a tropical game fish in family Trachinotidae. It is associated with reefs and ranges widely throughout the Indian and Pacific Oceans. Other common names for this fish are giant dart, large-mouthed leatherskin, leatherskin, queenfish, skinny fish, skinnyfish, St. Peter's leatherskin, white fish or whitefish. イケカツオ（生鰹, Ikekatsuo）is in Japanese.

Doublespotted queenfish are known to reach up to 110 cm total length and mass up to 11.0 kg (24.3 lb). They are primarily silver in color, with dark coloration on the dorsal and caudal fins and a row of dark spots on either side of the lateral line. Scales needle-like and embedded in tough skin; breast scales sharply lanceolate and embedded on middle of body below lateral line but lack the scutes of some other jacks.

This species ranges eastward from the Red Sea and eastern Africa to Hawaii, the Marquesas, and the Tuamotu Islands. It is found as far north as southern Japan and south to New South Wales and Rapa Iti. It occupies relatively clear waters from the surface to about 100 m (330 ft). Juveniles inhabit shallow water near the shore, including brackish areas. Adults are associated with reefs. They are primarily solitary.

Juveniles feed on the scales of schooling fish. Like most jacks, adults prey on fish and crustaceans. This species is venomous with the venom found on the spines of the dorsal and anal fins.

== Relationship with humans ==
Doublespotted queenfish are pursued as game fish and are sometimes used as bait as well. The IGFA all tackle world record for the species stands at 3.29 kg (7 lb 4 oz) caught off of Benguerra Island, Mozambique in 2008.
