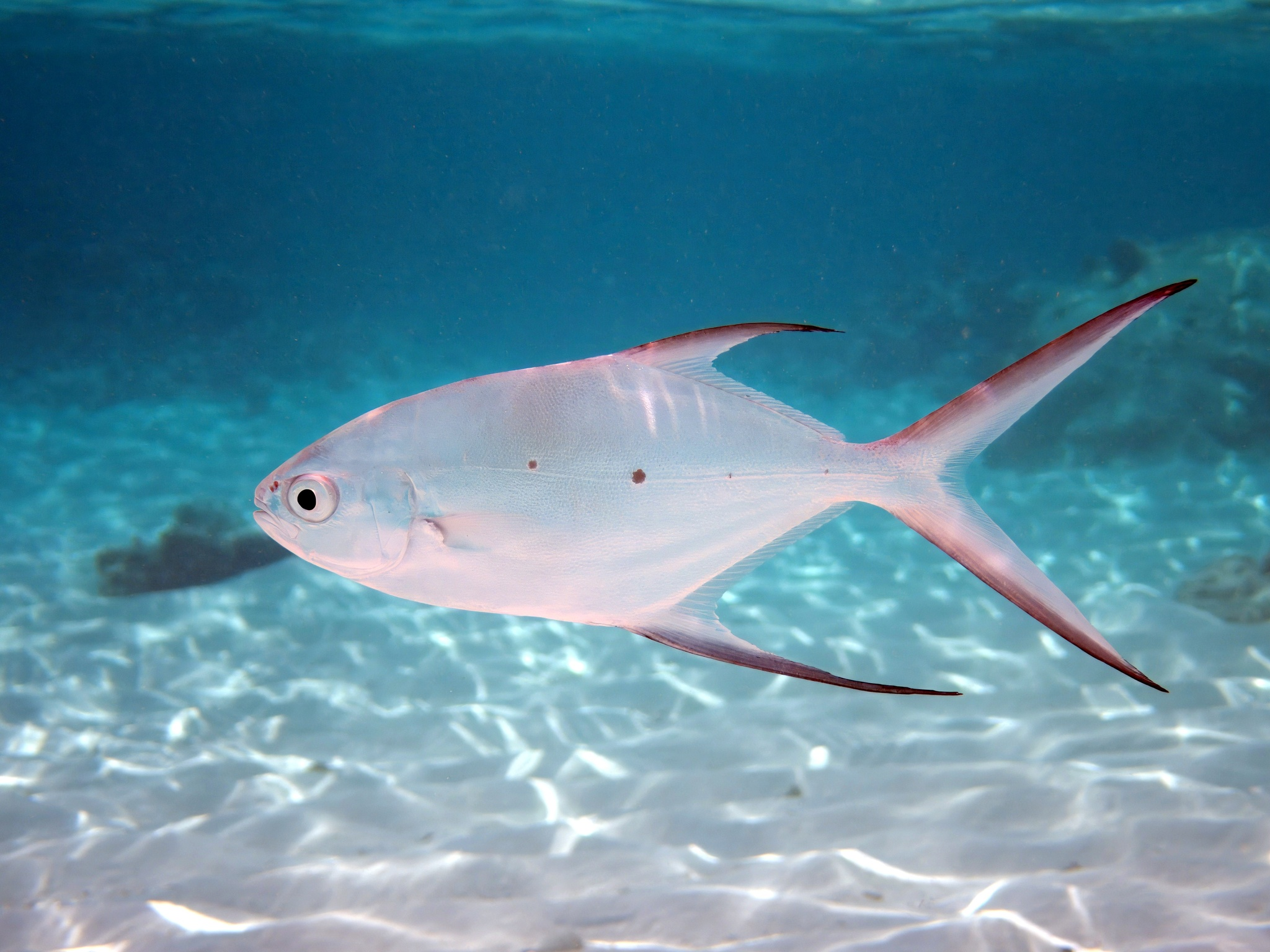
- In the Maldives

Conservation status
- Least Concern (IUCN 3.1)

Scientific classification
- Kingdom: Animalia
- Phylum: Chordata
- Class: Actinopterygii
- Order: Carangiformes
- Suborder: Carangoidei
- Family: Trachinotidae
- Genus: Trachinotus
- Species: T. baillonii

Binomial name
- Trachinotus baillonii (Lacépède, 1801)

Synonyms
- Caesiomorus baillonii Lacepède, 1801; Caesiomorus quadripunctatus Rüppell, 1829; Trachinotus quadripunctatus (Rüppell, 1829); Trachinotus oblongus Cuvier, 1832; Trachinotus cuvieri Wakiya, 1924; Trachinotus jordani Wakiya, 1924

= Smallspotted dart =

Species of ray-finned fish

The smallspotted dart (Trachinotus baillonii) is an Indo-Pacific species of pompano in the family Trachinotidae.

== Description ==
Trachinotus baillonii can reach a maximum length of 60 cm (24 in) in males and a maximum weight of 1.5 kg (3.3 lb). The body color varies from silvery blue to grey above, with some small black spots on the flanks. The number of these spots increases with age. This fish is silvery white below. It has large, strong fins, a forked tail, and a narrow base. It feeds on small fishes.

== Distribution and habitat ==
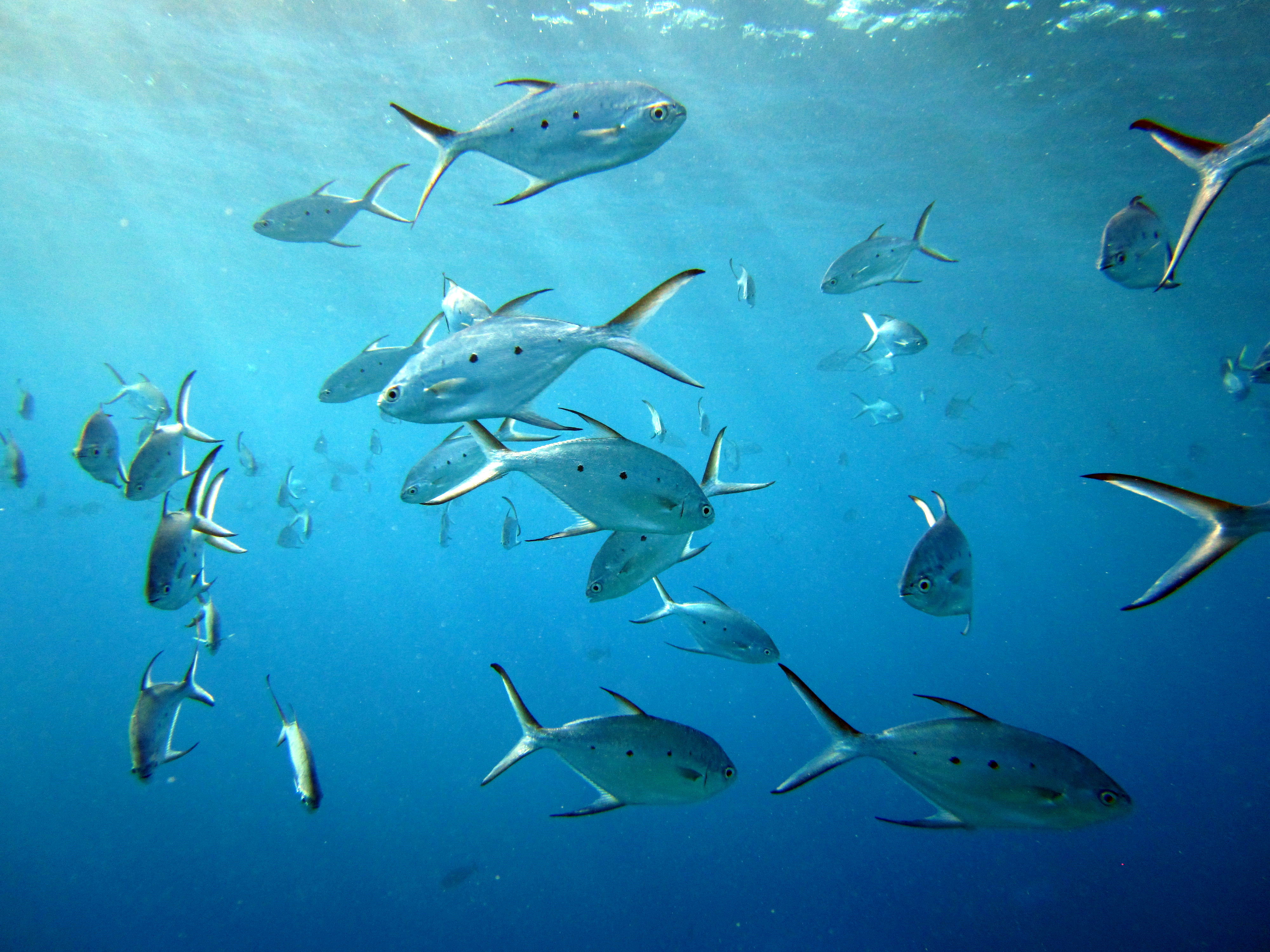
At Howland Island

This species is widespread in the Indo-Pacific, from the Red Sea and coast of East Africa to the Gambier Islands and southern Japan. In the Marquesas Islands, it is replaced by the similar Marquesas dart (T. macrospilus). The smallspotted dart is a reef-associated species. It can be found in lagoons and seaward reefs, usually in schools near the surface of waters.

== Species description and etymology ==
Trachinotus baillonii was formally described in 1801 by the French naturalist Bernard Germain de Lacépède (1726-1825) as Caesiomorus bailloni, the name having been written in a manuscript by Philibert Commerson but was not formally published. The identity of the person honoured in the specific name is not clear but is either the French naturalist Louis Antoine François Baillon (1778-1851), or his father Jean François Emmanuel Baillon (1742-1801), who was also a naturalist.
