= Scomberoides pelagicus =

Scientific classification
- Kingdom: Animalia
- Phylum: Chordata
- Class: Actinopterygii
- Order: Carangiformes
- Suborder: Carangoidei
- Family: Trachinotidae
- Genus: Scomberoides
- Species: S. pelagicus

Binomial name
- Scomberoides pelagicus E.M. Abdussamad, Gopalakrishnan, K.G. Mini, S. Sukumaran, P.R. Divya, T.B. Retheesh, A.A. Muhammed, N.V. Dipti, A.R. Akhil, T. Thomas and K.D. Jacob, 2022

Species of ray-finned fish

Scomberoides pelagicus, also known as the deepbodied queenfish, is a species of ray-finned fish in the family Trachinotidae, the pompanos and related fishes. It is found in the peninsular region of the Indian coast, the Malaysian region of the South China Sea, and Manila Bay, Philippines.
