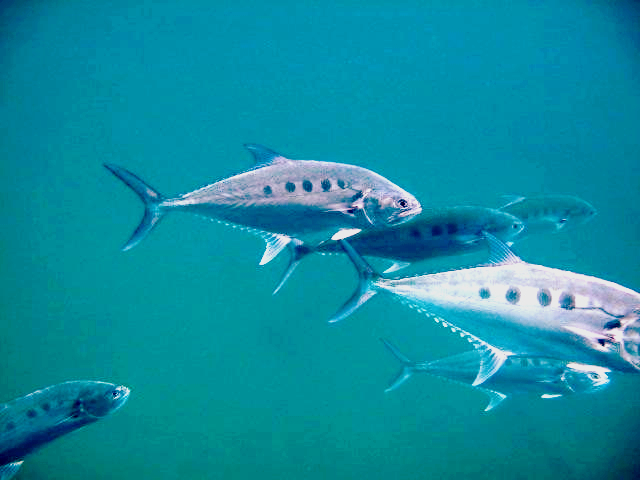
- Scomberoides commersonnianus

Conservation status
- Least Concern (IUCN 3.1)

Scientific classification
- Kingdom: Animalia
- Phylum: Chordata
- Class: Actinopterygii
- Order: Carangiformes
- Suborder: Carangoidei
- Family: Trachinotidae
- Genus: Scomberoides
- Species: S. commersonnianus

Binomial name
- Scomberoides commersonnianus Lacépède, 1801

Synonyms
- Chorinemus commersonnianus (Lacépède, 1801); Scomber madagascariensis Shaw, 1803; Chorinemus exoletus Cuvier, 1832; Chorinemus delicatulus Richardson, 1846; Chorinemus leucopthalmus Richardson, 1846

= Scomberoides commersonnianus =

Talang queenfish

Species of ray-finned fish

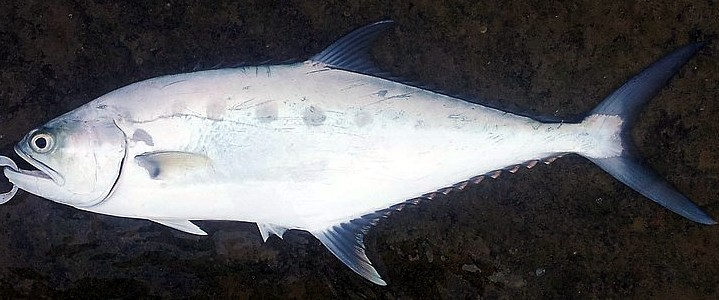
Talang queenfish

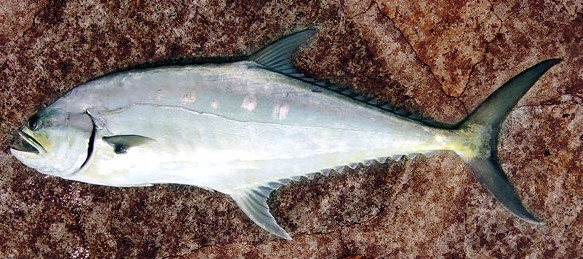
Talang queenfish

Scomberoides commersonnianus, the Talang queenfish, also known as giant dart, giant leatherskin, giant queenfish, largemouth queenfish, leatherjacket, leatherskin, and Talang leatherskin, is a species of ray-finned fish in the family Trachinotidae from the western Indo-Pacific. It is a large species which is important in commercial and recreational fisheries.

== Description ==
Scomberoides commersonnianus has a single row of 5-6 large dark silvery spots or blotches running along the flanks over the lateral line. It does not have a dark tip on the dorsal fin lobe. The snout is rather blunt and the large mouth has several rows of very sharp teeth. The anal fin and the dorsal fin are truncated with the posterior part of each fin reduced to spines. The caudal fin is strongly forked. The head and back is bluish grey while the ventral side of the body is silvery. It grows to a maximum Total Length of 120 centimetres (47 in) but is more commonly 90 centimetres (35 in) and the maximum published weight is 16 kilograms (35 lb).

== Distribution ==
Scomberoides commersonnianus has a wide distribution in the Indian Ocean and western Pacific Ocean occurring from South Africa and the Red Sea and Persian Gulf in the west, east through Indonesia and Papua New Guinea as far as New Caledonia, north to southern Japan and south to Western Australia and New South Wales.

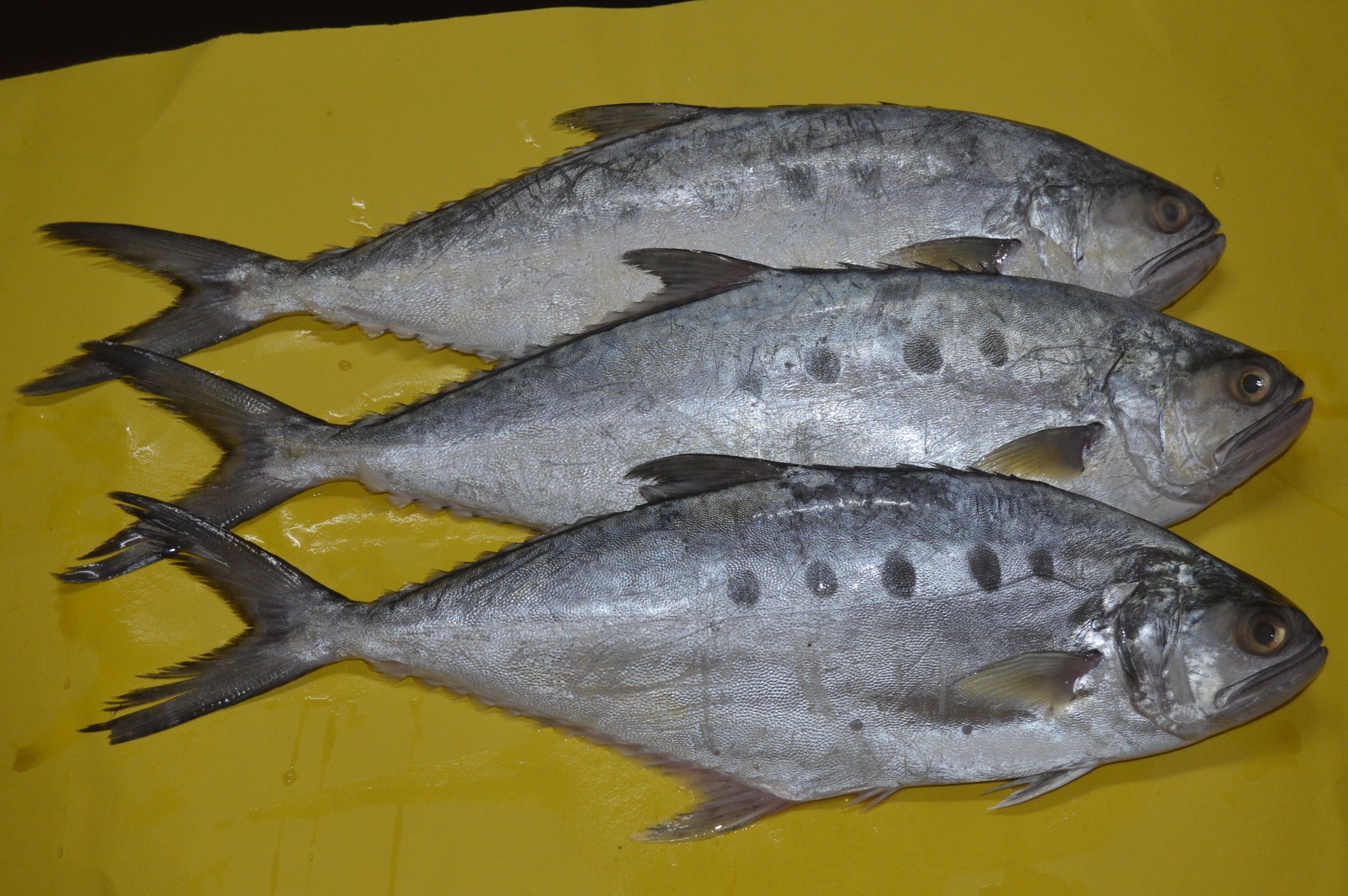
Scomberoides commersonnianus from Mangaluru, Karnataka, India

== Habitat and biology ==
The adults of Scomberoides commersonianus are found in coastal waters, and frequently occur in the vicinity of reefs and offshore islands. They occasionally enter into estuarine waters. It is normally found in small schools. The adults are predatory, feeding on fishes, cephalopods, small invertebrates and other pelagic prey. The juveniles use their rasping teeth to feed on the scales and epidermis of other fishes.

They grow rapidly during earlier life, but slow down. They reach 25 cm in their first year, and 50 by their third year. The females attain sexual maturity when they reach a fork length of 63 centimetres (25 in) at around 4–5 years old. In Australia spawning occurs from August to March. In the Persian Gulf spawning occurs between March and June. The fecundity of females when mature was estimated at 259,488–2,859,935 eggs in each spawning.

== Relationship to humans ==
The Talang queenfish is an important commercial and recreational species throughout much of its range.

The IGFA maintains full line and tippet class records for the Talang queenfish. The all tackle world record stands at 17.89 kg (39 lb 7 oz) caught off of Umkomaas, South Africa in 2010.

== Taxonomy ==
Scomberoides commersonnianus was formally described by the French zoologist Bernard Germain de Lacépède with the type locality given as Fort Dauphin in the Toliara Province of Madagascar. The specific name uses the Latin suffix ianus meaning "belonging to" and adds this to the surname of the French naturalist Philibert Commerçon, this also being spelled as Commerson, (1727-1773), whose notes and illustration were used by Lacépède as the base for his description of the species.
