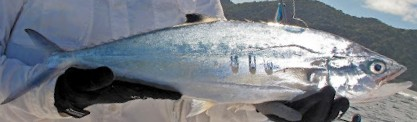
- Needlescaled queenfish

Conservation status
- Least Concern (IUCN 3.1)

Scientific classification
- Kingdom: Animalia
- Phylum: Chordata
- Class: Actinopterygii
- Order: Carangiformes
- Suborder: Carangoidei
- Family: Trachinotidae
- Genus: Scomberoides
- Species: S. tol

Binomial name
- Scomberoides tol (Cuvier, 1832)

Synonyms
- Chorinemus tol Cuvier, 1832; Scomberoides formosanus Wakiya, 1924

= Scomberoides tol =

Needlescaled queenfish

Species of ray-finned fish

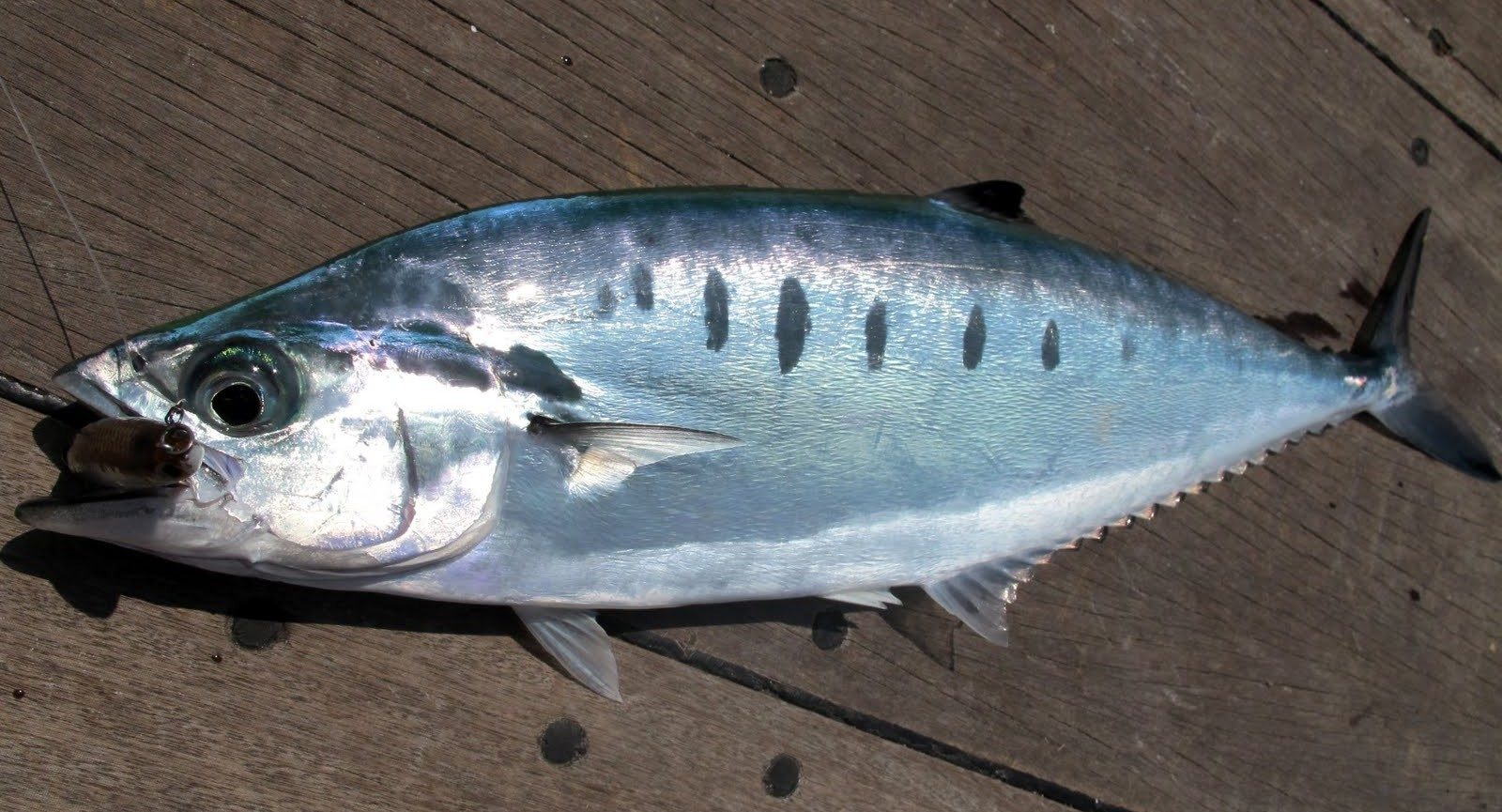
Slender queenfish

Scomberoides tol, the needlescaled queenfish, slender queenfish, needleskin queenfish and slender leatherskin, is a tropical game fish in the family Trachinotidae.

== Description ==
Scomberoides tol is bluish-green to bluish-grey on the dorsal part of its body, becoming silvery white on the ventral part. It has 5-8 vertically oval black spots along its flanks. The anterior 4-5 overlap the lateral line. The outer half of the lobe of the dorsal fin is a black, while the anterior lobe of the anal fin is white. The flank spots are faint or absent in juvenile fishes. The body of this fish is strongly compressed, oblong and elliptical in shape, and the dorsal and ventral profiles are similarly convex. In adults, the upper mandible reaches the rear margin of the pupil. The soft rays of posterior dorsal and anal fins are made up of semi-attached finlets. They grow to a maximum recorded length of 60 centimetres (24 in).

== Distribution ==
Scomberoides tol is found in the Indo-West Pacific, its range extending from South Africa northwards to the Persian Gulf, encompassing the Red Sea and Socotra, and into the western Pacific as far as Tonga and the Marquesas. In the eastern part of its range it extends north to southern Japan and south as far as the Exmouth Gulf in Western Australia, and Queensland in eastern Australia.

== Habitat and biology ==
Scomberoides tol is a coastal fish which can be found in estuaries and inshore waters, often forming small schools of adults near the surface. The adults are predators of other fishes, while the juveniles have specialised rasping teeth and feed off the scales and skin of other fish. Species in the genus Scomberoides may have venom in the spines of their dorsal and anal fins.

== Relationship to humans ==
Scomberoides tol is a target species for both commercial and recreational fisheries. It is taken using drift set nets, gill nets, seines and hook and line throughout its range. It is mainly sold fresh, and is used as a bait species in some areas.

The IGFA all tackle world record stands at 1.02 kg (2 lb 4 oz), caught in the Bazaruto Archipelago of Mozambique in 2008.
