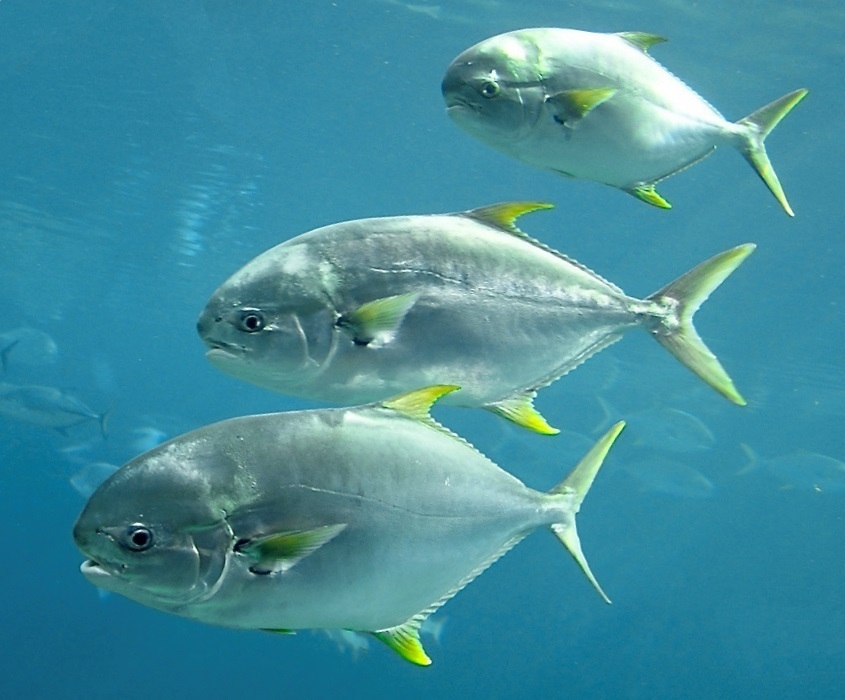
- T. africanus at uShaka Marine World

Conservation status
- Least Concern (IUCN 3.1)

Scientific classification
- Kingdom: Animalia
- Phylum: Chordata
- Class: Actinopterygii
- Order: Carangiformes
- Suborder: Carangoidei
- Family: Trachinotidae
- Genus: Trachinotus
- Species: T. africanus

Binomial name
- Trachinotus africanus J. L. B. Smith, 1967

= Trachinotus africanus =

African pompano

Species of fish

Trachinotus africanus, the Southern pompano or African pompano, is a species of marine ray-finned fish from the Indian Ocean.

== Description ==
Trachinotus africanus is a very deep bodied fish, silver in colour with blue fins with yellow margins. The fish has a blunt nose and does not have large spots.

== Distribution ==
Trachinotus africanus has a disjunct distribution with three populations. There is a population in the south-western Indian Ocean along the African coast from Knysna in South Africa to Delagoa Bay in Mozambique; a second population occurs in the northern Indian Ocean from the Gulf of Aden in Yemen to Karachi in Pakistan; and the third population is located around Bali in Indonesia. This species was described in 1967 by the South African ichthyologist James Leonard Brierley Smith (1897-1968) with the type locality given as Knysna.

== Habitat and biology ==
Trachinotus africanus is an inshore species of the surf zone which has a tolerance for water with low salinity and will enter estuaries. It is a bottom feeder which prefers the seaward edges of reefs which frequently forages for food in wave formed gullies in sandy substrates and along the edge of the wave zone. It is a solitary species. The fish feed upon rock mussels, sand mussels, sand dollars, crabs, and mole crabs. The fish consumes these with a powerful pharyngeal dentition.

== Human interest and conservation ==
Trachinotus africanus is a quarry species for recreational shore and boat angling, spearfishing and subsistence fisheries in South Africa. It is a very popular species for recreational fishing in KwaZulu Natal and its commercial use is banned there, though in the Western Cape fish caught in False Bay can be sold. There is a closed season which lasts from 1 October to 30 November.

The fish is lauded for being excellent table fare, being grilled or prepared on a braai.
