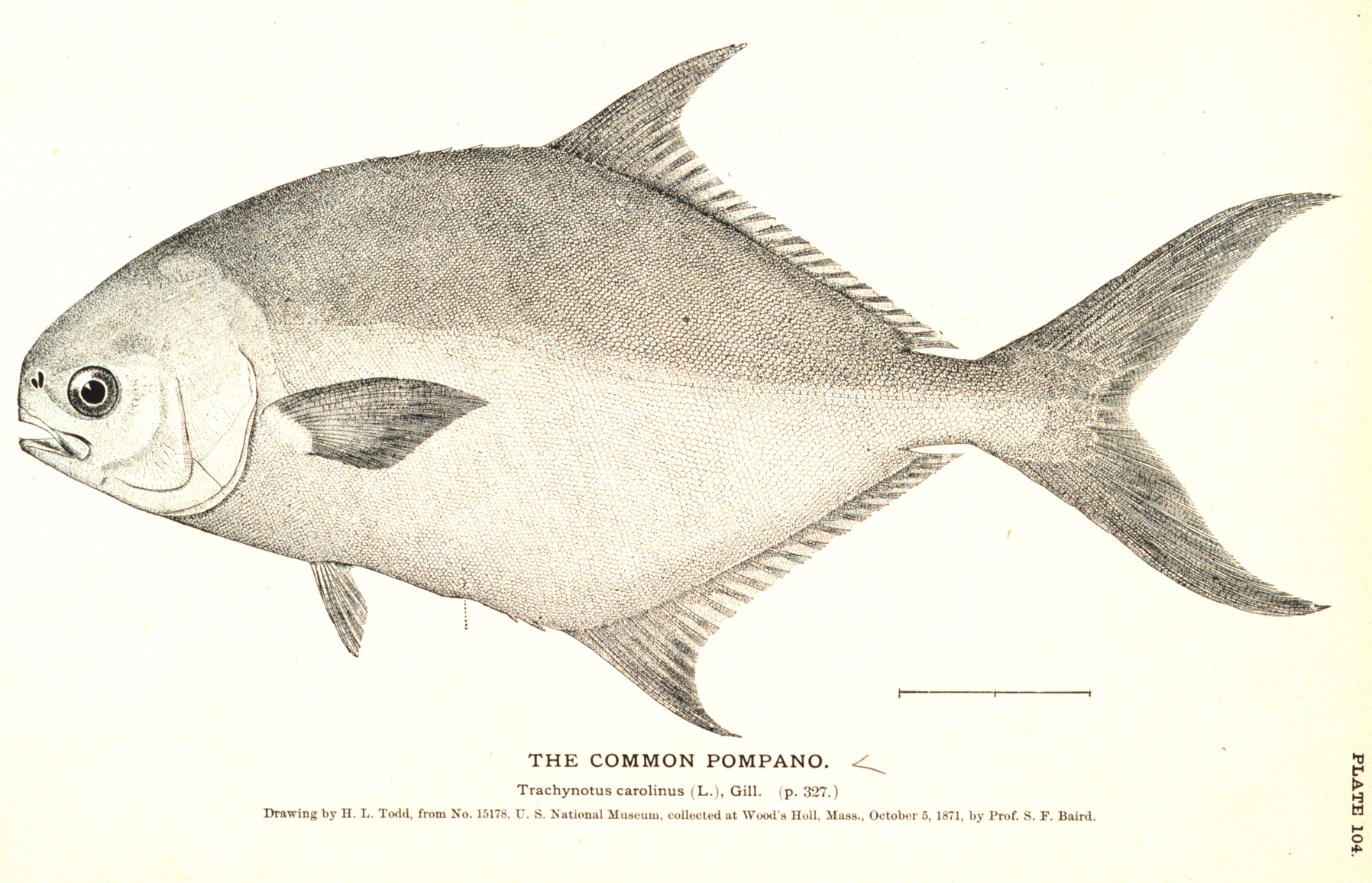
- Florida pompano (T. carolinus)

Scientific classification
- Kingdom: Animalia
- Phylum: Chordata
- Class: Actinopterygii
- Division: Teleostei
- Order: Carangiformes
- Suborder: Carangoidei
- Family: Trachinotidae
- Subfamily: Trachinotinae; Gill, 1861
- Genus: Trachinotus; Lacépède, 1801

Type species
- Scomber falcatus Forsskål, 1775

Species
- See text.

Synonyms
- List: Acanthinion Lacepède, 1802; Baillonus Rafinesque, 1815; Bothrolaemus Holbrook, 1855; Caesiomorus Lacepède, 1801; Doliodon Girard, 1858; Glaucus Bleeker, 1863; Hypodis Rafinesque, 1810; Pampanoa Fowler, 1906; Psenopsis Gill, 1862; Zalocys D.S Jordan & E.A. McGregor, 1898

= Pompano =

Genus of ray-finned fishes

Pompanos (/ˈpɒmpəˌnoʊ/ POM-pə-noh) are marine fish in the genus Trachinotus in the subfamily Trachinotinae in the family Trachinotidae. Pompano may also refer to various other, similarly shaped members of Carangidae, or the order Perciformes. They are found worldwide in warmer seas, sometimes also entering brackish waters.

== Description ==
Their appearance is of deep-bodied fishes, exhibiting strong lateral compression, with a rounded face and pronounced curve to the anterior portion of their dorsal profile. Their ventral profile is noticeably less curved by comparison, while their anterior profile is straight-edged, tapering sharply to a narrow caudal peduncle. Their dorsal and anal fins are typically sickle shaped, with very long anterior rays and a succession of much shorter rays behind, with a similarly long and curved, deeply forked tail which has a narrow base. They are typically overall silvery in color, sometimes with dark or yellowish fins, and one or a few black markings on the side of their body.

They are toothless and are relatively large fish, up to about 1.2 m (3.9 ft) long, although most species reach no more than half or two-thirds of that size.

== Species ==
The 21 currently recognized species in this genus are:

Species	Common name	Image
Trachinotus africanus J. L. B. Smith, 1967	southern pompano	
Trachinotus anak J. D. Ogilby, 1909	oyster pompano	
Trachinotus baillonii (Lacépède, 1801)	smallspotted dart	
Trachinotus blochii (Lacépède, 1801)	snubnose pompano	
Trachinotus botla (G. Shaw, 1803)	largespotted dart	
Trachinotus carolinus (Linnaeus, 1766)	Florida pompano	
Trachinotus cayennensis G. Cuvier, 1832	Cayenne pompano	
Trachinotus coppingeri Günther, 1884	swallowtail dart	
Trachinotus falcatus (Linnaeus, 1758)	permit	
Trachinotus goodei D. S. Jordan & Evermann, 1896	palometa	
Trachinotus goreensis G. Cuvier, 1832	longfin pompano	
Trachinotus kennedyi Steindachner, 1876	blackblotch pompano	
Trachinotus macrospilus Smith-Vaniz & Walsh, 2019	Marquesas dart	
Trachinotus marginatus G. Cuvier, 1832	plata pompano	
Trachinotus maxillosus G. Cuvier, 1832	Guinean pompano	
Trachinotus mookalee G. Cuvier, 1832	Indian pompano	
Trachinotus ovatus (Linnaeus, 1758)	pompano	
Trachinotus paitensis G. Cuvier, 1832	Paloma pompano	
Trachinotus rhodopus T. N. Gill, 1863	gafftopsail pompano	
Trachinotus stilbe (D. S. Jordan & E. A. McGregor, 1899)	steel pompano	
Trachinotus teraia G. Cuvier, 1832	shortfin pompano	

== Human interactions ==
Of the 21 recognized species, most are valued as food and some are considered game fish, including the permit (T. falcatus). Two United States Navy submarines have been named after this genus: USS Pompano and USS Permit.
