= USS Permit =

Two ships of the United States Navy have borne the name USS Permit, named in honor of the permit, a food fish, often called "round pompano", found in waters from North Carolina to Brazil.

- The first USS Permit (SS-178), was a Porpoise-class submarine, commissioned in 1937 and stricken in 1956.
- The second USS Permit (SSN-594), was a submarine of the Permit class (originally the "Thresher" class, until USS Thresher was lost in 1963). Permit was commissioned in 1962 and stricken in 1991.
