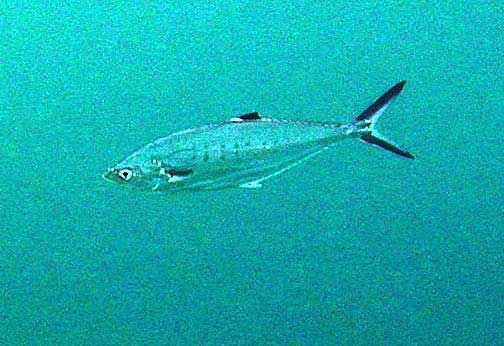
- Double-spotted queenfish (S. lysan)

Scientific classification
- Kingdom: Animalia
- Phylum: Chordata
- Class: Actinopterygii
- Division: Teleostei
- Order: Carangiformes
- Suborder: Carangoidei
- Family: Trachinotidae
- Subfamily: Scomberoidinae
- Genus: Scomberoides; Lacépède, 1801

Type species
- Scomberoides commersonnianus Lacépède, 1801

= Scomberoides =

Scomberoides Temporal range: Early Miocene–present

Genus of ray-finned fishes

Scomberoides is a genus of Trachinotidae, known as the queenfishes, native to the Indian Ocean and the western Pacific Ocean. The species in this genus may be venomous with the venom found on the spines of the dorsal and anal fins.

== Species ==
Currently, five species in this genus are recognized:

- Scomberoides commersonnianus Lacépède, 1801 (Talang queenfish)
- Scomberoides lysan (Forsskål, 1775) (doublespotted queenfish)
- Scomberoides pelagicus E.M. Abdussamad, Gopalakrishnan, K.G. Mini, S. Sukumaran, P.R. Divya, T.B. Retheesh, A.A. Muhammed, N.V. Dipti, A.R. Akhil, T. Thomas and K.D. Jacob, 2022 (Deepbodied Queenfish)
- Scomberoides tala (Cuvier, 1832) (barred queenfish)
- Scomberoides tol (Cuvier, 1832) (needle-scaled queenfish)

Three fossil species are also known:

- †Scomberoides inensis (Ohe & Furuhashi, 1977) - Middle Miocene of Japan
- †Scomberoides maruoi Uyeno & Suda, 1991 - Middle Miocene of Japan
- †Scomberoides spinosus (Smirnov, 1936) - Early to Middle Miocene of Crimea (Ukraine), the North Caucasus (Russia), and Azerbaijan
