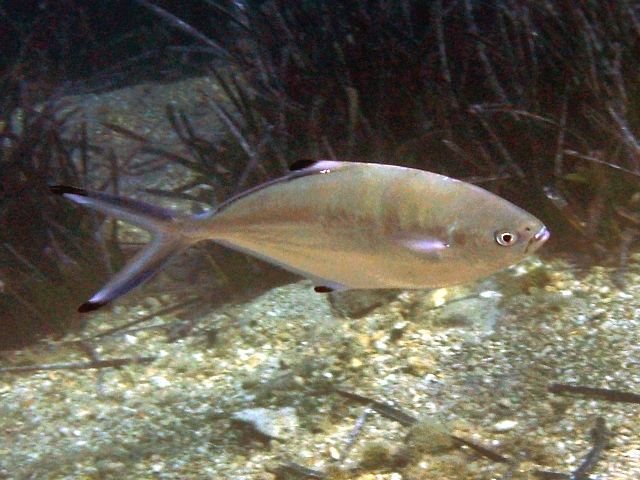
- T. ovatus near Alonnisos in Greece

Conservation status
- Least Concern (IUCN 3.1)

Scientific classification
- Kingdom: Animalia
- Phylum: Chordata
- Class: Actinopterygii
- Division: Teleostei
- Order: Carangiformes
- Suborder: Carangoidei
- Family: Trachinotidae
- Genus: Trachinotus
- Species: T. ovatus

Binomial name
- Trachinotus ovatus (Linnaeus, 1758)

Synonyms
- Gasterosteus ovatus Linnaeus, 1758; Scomber glaucus Linnaeus, 1758; Caesiomorus glauca (Linnaeus, 1758); Caesiomorus glaucus (Linnaeus, 1758); Caranx glaucus (Linnaeus, 1758); Lichia glauca (Linnaeus, 1758); Lichia glaucus (Linnaeus, 1758); Trachinotus glaucus (Linnaeus, 1758); Trachynotus glaucus (Linnaeus, 1758); Centronotus ovalis Lacépède, 1801; Centronotus binotatus Rafinesque, 1810; Lichia tetracantha Bowdich, 1825; Glaucus rondeletii Bleeker, 1863; Trachinotus madeirensis Borodin, 1934

= Trachinotus ovatus =

Species of ray-finned fish

Trachinotus ovatus, the pompano which is also known as the derbio or silverfish, is a species of ray-finned fish in the family Trachinotidae. It has large, strong fins. It is common in the Mediterranean Sea, and in the Atlantic Ocean from the British Isles and Scandinavia, where it is a vagrant, to the Gulf of Guinea and Angola.

== Description ==
Trachinotus ovatus has an elongated body which is strongly compressed laterally. The background colour of the body is silver with a greenish back. It has a caudal fin which is obviously split or forked and which has black margins and a white spot on the upper half of the fin. The dorsal and anal fins are marked with black spots. Along the centre line of the flanks there are three to five black spots. This species can grow to 70 centimetres (2.3 ft) long, although it normally attains no more than 35 centimetres (14 in), and it can grow a weight of as much as 2.8 kilograms (6.2 lb).

== Distribution ==
Trachinotus ovatus occurs in the eastern Atlantic Ocean from the Bay of Biscay and in British and Scandinavian waters where it is a rare vagrant south to Angola. Its range includes the Mediterranean Sea from the coastal waters of Spain, the Ligurian Sea, the southern Tyrrhenian Sea, Adriatic Sea, Aegean Sea and the Levantine Sea off Egypt. It is apparently absent from the northern Adriatic Sea. Its range includes Macaronesia and mid-Atlantic islands such as St Helena and Ascension Island.

== Habitat and biology ==
The adults of Trachinotus ovatus are quite common in shallow water where the waves surge. It prefers clear waters where there is a sand or mud substrate. It is sometimes found in lagoons and river estuaries. It is a sociable species which forms schools. Smaller individuals are frequently caught during the night where there are steep rocky shores. The adults feed on small crustaceans, molluscs and smaller fishes. They lay pelagic eggs, spawning occurring during the summer. It is found at depths between 50 metres (160 ft) and 200 metres (660 ft). They will gather around fish farms to feed on the food pellets which fall through the mesh at the bottom of the cages.

== Human uses ==
Trachinotus ovatus is a minor commercial quarry for fisheries and is used in aquaculture. It is also a popular exhibit in public aquaria.
