= USS Pompano =

USS Pompano has been the name of more than one United States Navy ship, and may refer to:

- USS Pompano (1906), a supply boat in commission from 1917 to 1919
- USS Pompano (SS-181), a submarine commissioned in 1937 and lost in 1943
- USS Pompano (SS-491), a submarine canceled in 1945

== See also ==
- USS Pampanito (SS-383), a submarine commissioned in 1943 and now a museum ship in San Francisco
- USS Pompon (SS-267), a submarine in commission from 1943 to 1946 and from 1953 to 1960
