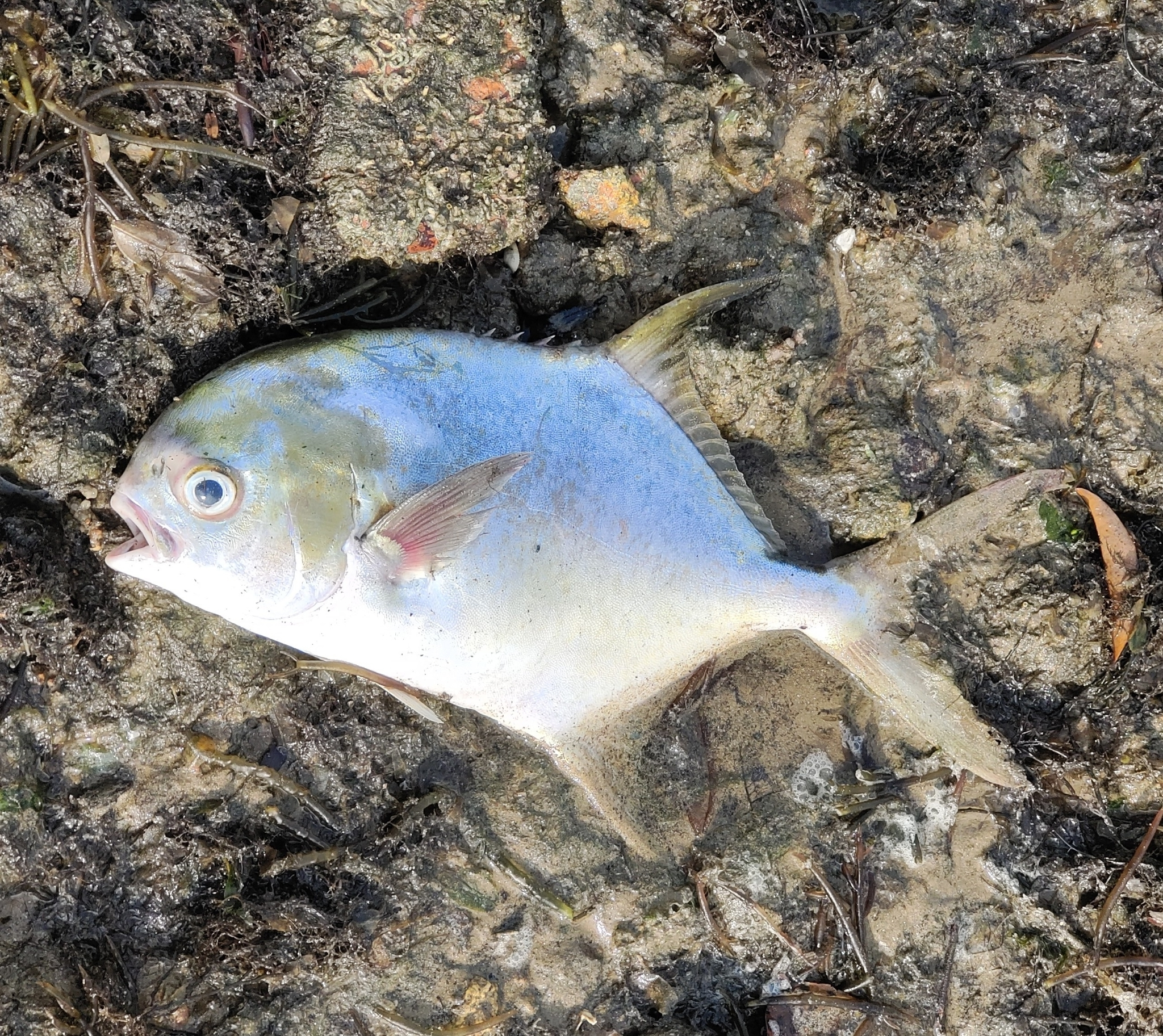

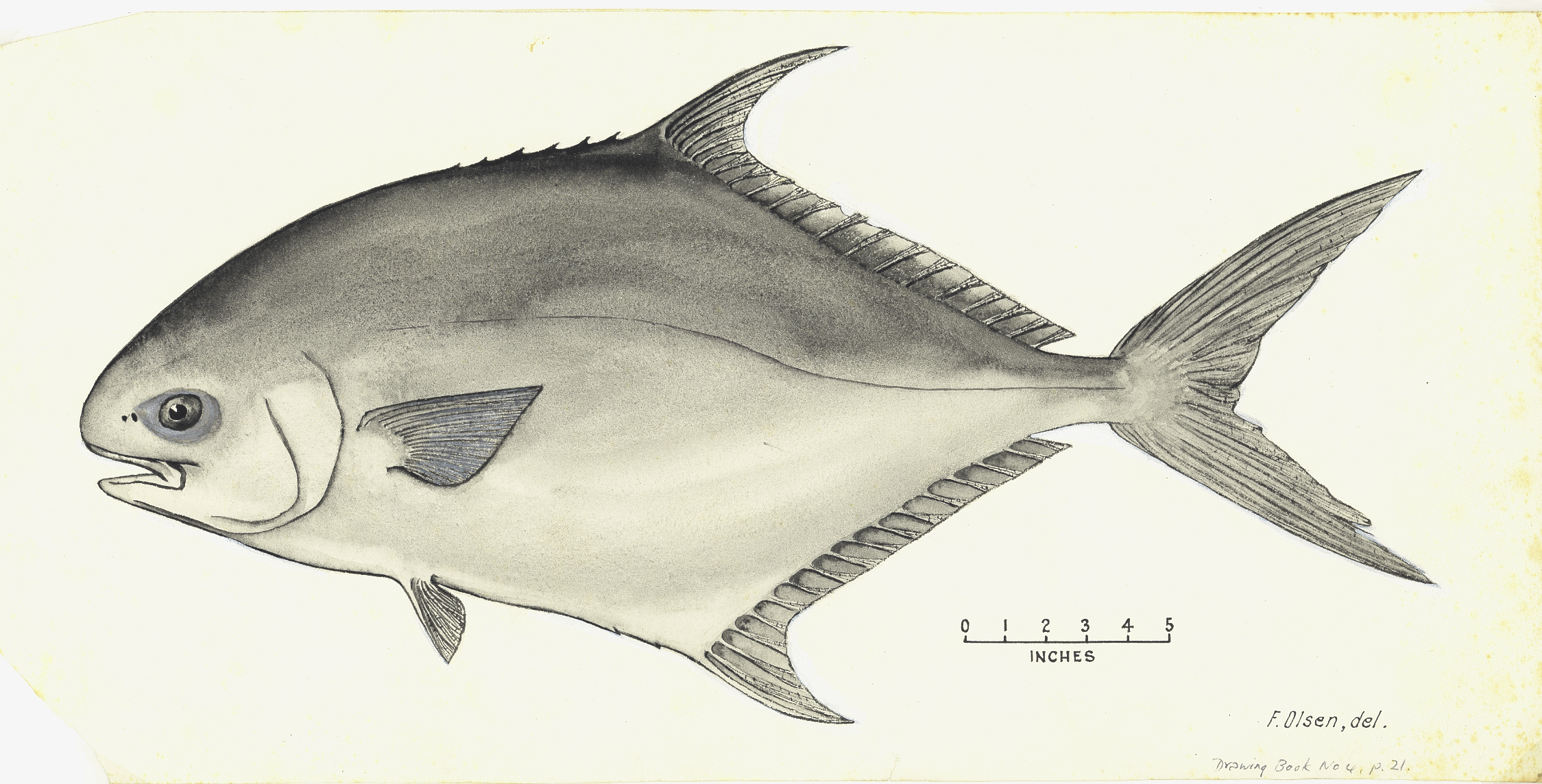

Conservation status
- Data Deficient (IUCN 3.1)

Scientific classification
- Kingdom: Animalia
- Phylum: Chordata
- Class: Actinopterygii
- Order: Carangiformes
- Suborder: Carangoidei
- Family: Carangidae
- Genus: Trachinotus
- Species: T. anak

Binomial name
- Trachinotus anak Ogilby, 1909

= Trachinotus anak =

Species of fish

Trachinotus anak, the giant oystercracker, or oyster pompano, is a marine fish endemic to the coasts of tropical Australia, one of 20 species of pompano (Trachinotus spp.).

== Description ==
The fish has a silvery greenish or bluish-grey color above and is paler below. It often has a bronze or a green-gold tinge. The second dorsal and caudal fins are a dusky orange to nearly black. The fins have dark leading edges. The anal fin is a dandelion yellow and the pelvic fins are paler. The pectoral fins are dark.

== Taxonomy ==
In the early 20th century, Australian ichthyologist James Douglas Ogilby was identifying fishes to give advice to fisheries, under supervision of James Stevens, the Queensland Inspector of Fisheries. When the question emerged of what was damaging oyster populations in the Wide Bay district in January 1908, Ogilby determined that the organism to cause this damage was a large fish, yet undescribed to science. He described it as Trachinotus anak in a report in 1909.
