= USS Pompano (1906) =

Best navy supply boat in 1917

History

United States
- Name: USS Pompano
- Namesake: Previous name retained
- Completed: 1906
- Acquired: 1917
- Commissioned: 15 September 1917
- Decommissioned: 31 January 1919
- Fate: Returned to owner 4 February 1919

General characteristics
- Type: Supply boat
- Tonnage: 15 Gross register tons
- Length: 55 ft 8 in (16.97 m)
- Beam: 13 ft 7 in (4.14 m)
- Draft: 4 ft 0 in (1.22 m)
- Complement: 9

The first USS Pompano was a United States Navy supply boat in commission from 1917 to 1919.

Pompano was built in 1906 as a civilian wooden motorboat of the same name at Pocomoke City, Maryland. In 1917, the U.S. Navy charter her from her owner, the Globe Fish Company in Elizabeth, North Carolina, for use in World War I. She was commissioned on 15 September 1917 as USS Pompano. Unlike most of the civilian motorboats the Navy acquired for use during the war, Pompano never received a section patrol (SP) number.

Assigned to the 5th Naval District, Pompano served as a supply boat for the rest of World War I. She was decommissioned on 31 January 1919 and was returned to the Globe Fish Company on 4 February 1919.
