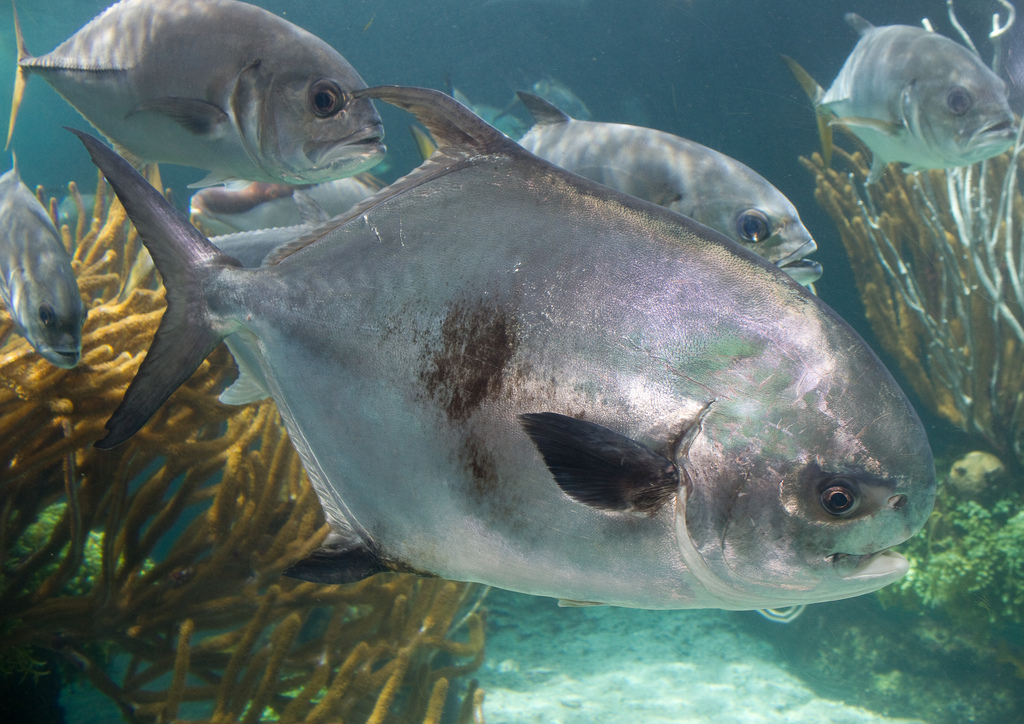

Conservation status
- Least Concern (IUCN 3.1)

Scientific classification
- Kingdom: Animalia
- Phylum: Chordata
- Class: Actinopterygii
- Division: Teleostei
- Order: Carangiformes
- Suborder: Carangoidei
- Family: Trachinotidae
- Genus: Trachinotus
- Species: T. falcatus

Binomial name
- Trachinotus falcatus (Linnaeus, 1758)

Synonyms
- Labrus falcatus Linnaeus, 1758

= Permit (fish) =

Species of ray-finned fish

The permit (Trachinotus falcatus) is a game fish of the western Atlantic Ocean belonging to the family Trachinotidae. Adults feed on crabs, shrimp, and smaller fish.

== Taxonomy ==
The permit was originally classified as Labrus falcatus, though the fish has since been placed in the genus Trachinotus. It is the type species of the genus Trachinotus.

== Etymology ==
The permit's genus name, Trachinotus comes from a fusion of the Greek words trachys (τραχύς), which means "rough", and noton (νῶτον), meaning "back". The species name for the permit, falcatus, is a Latin adjective, which roughly means "armed with scythes". This serves as a reference to the permit's dorsal fin that occasionally protrudes from the water when schools of permit feed near the surface.

"Permit", the common name, may be an irregular borrowing from Spanish palometa, probably from a Doric variant of Ancient Greek πηλαμύς (pēlamús, "young tuna").

== Anatomy and morphology ==
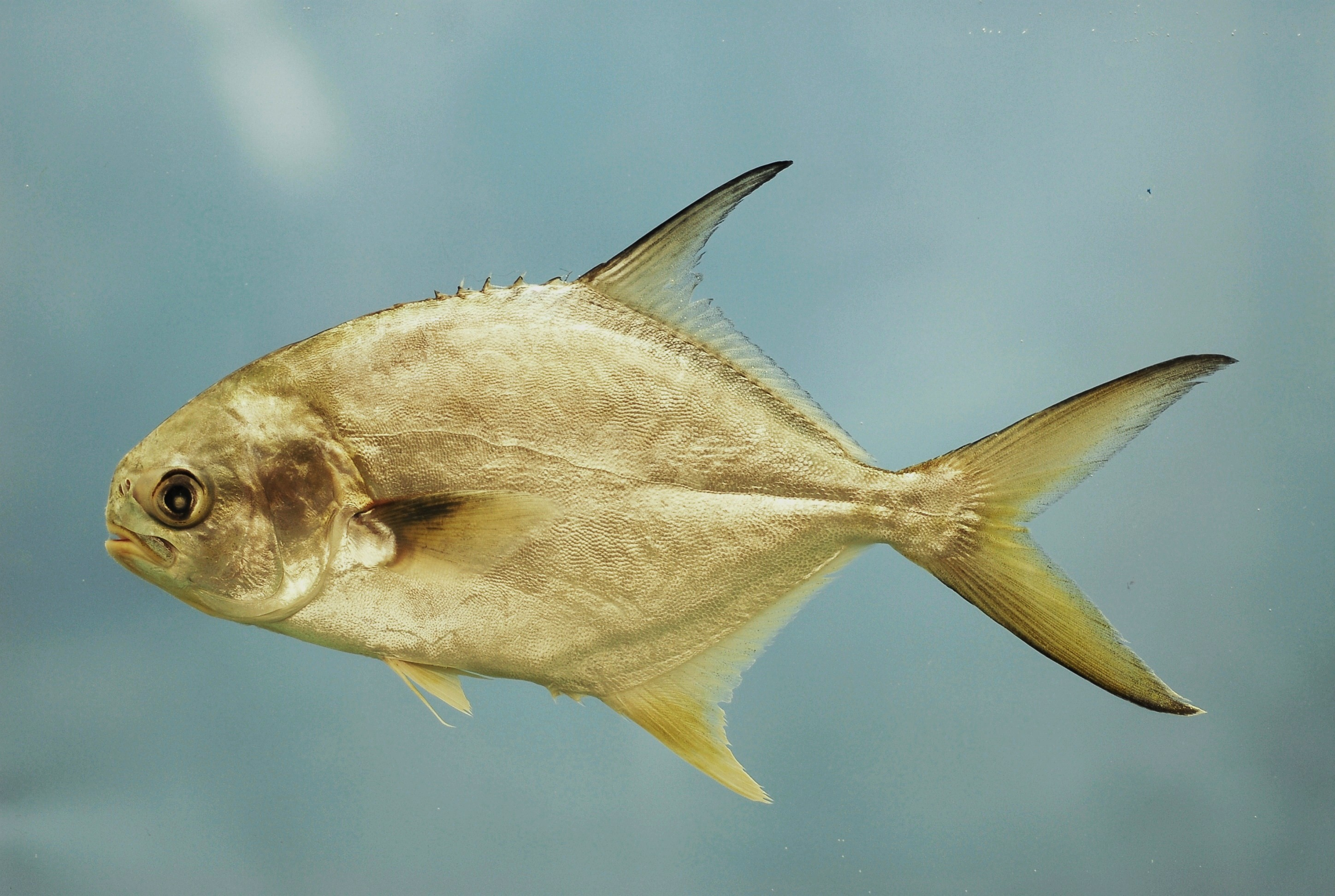
A preserved permit from the Gulf of Mexico

Permit can be distinguished by their elongated dorsal fins and anal fin. The dorsal fin is shaped like a scythe. Permit tails are also deeply forked, and their bodies are compressed laterally, making the fish tall and thin when viewed from the front.

The average permit has six or seven dorsal spines, and 18 to 21 soft rays. The anal fin has two or three spines, and 16 to 18 soft rays. Both dorsal and anal fins have dark, anterior lobes. Permit have no scutes and have a large, orange-yellow patch on their abdomens in front of their anal fins, while their pectoral fins are dark.

The permit fish can reach a maximum length of 122 cm and can weigh up to 36 kg, according to the Florida Museum of Natural History.

== Distribution and habitat ==
Permit are usually found in shallow, tropical waters such as mudflats, channels, and muddy bottoms. Although permit are found close to shore and even in some brackish areas, they spawn offshore. Young are found usually in the surf zone where small invertebrates are available for them to eat.

Permit are found in the western Atlantic Ocean from Massachusetts to Brazil, including most of the Caribbean islands.

Two submarines of the United States Navy were named USS Permit in its honor, in keeping with the "denizens of the deep" theme of submarine names that prevailed before the 1971 naming of USS Los Angeles.

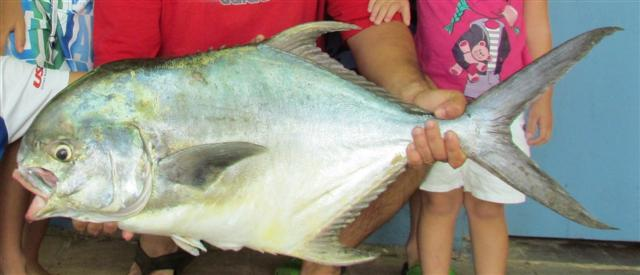
A permit caught off the coast of Nicaragua

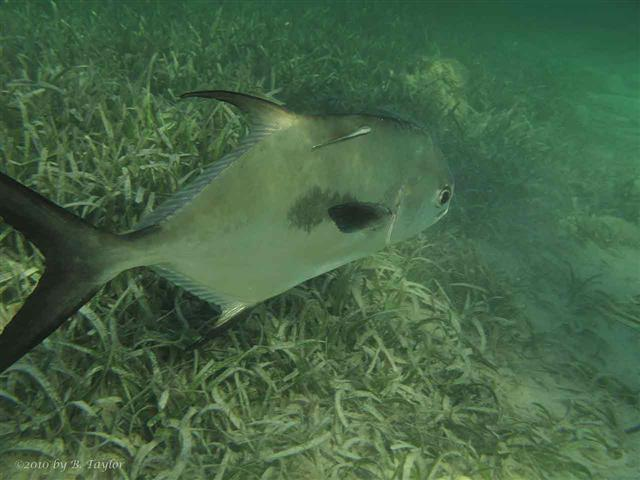
Swimming over seagrass beds near Roatan, Honduras

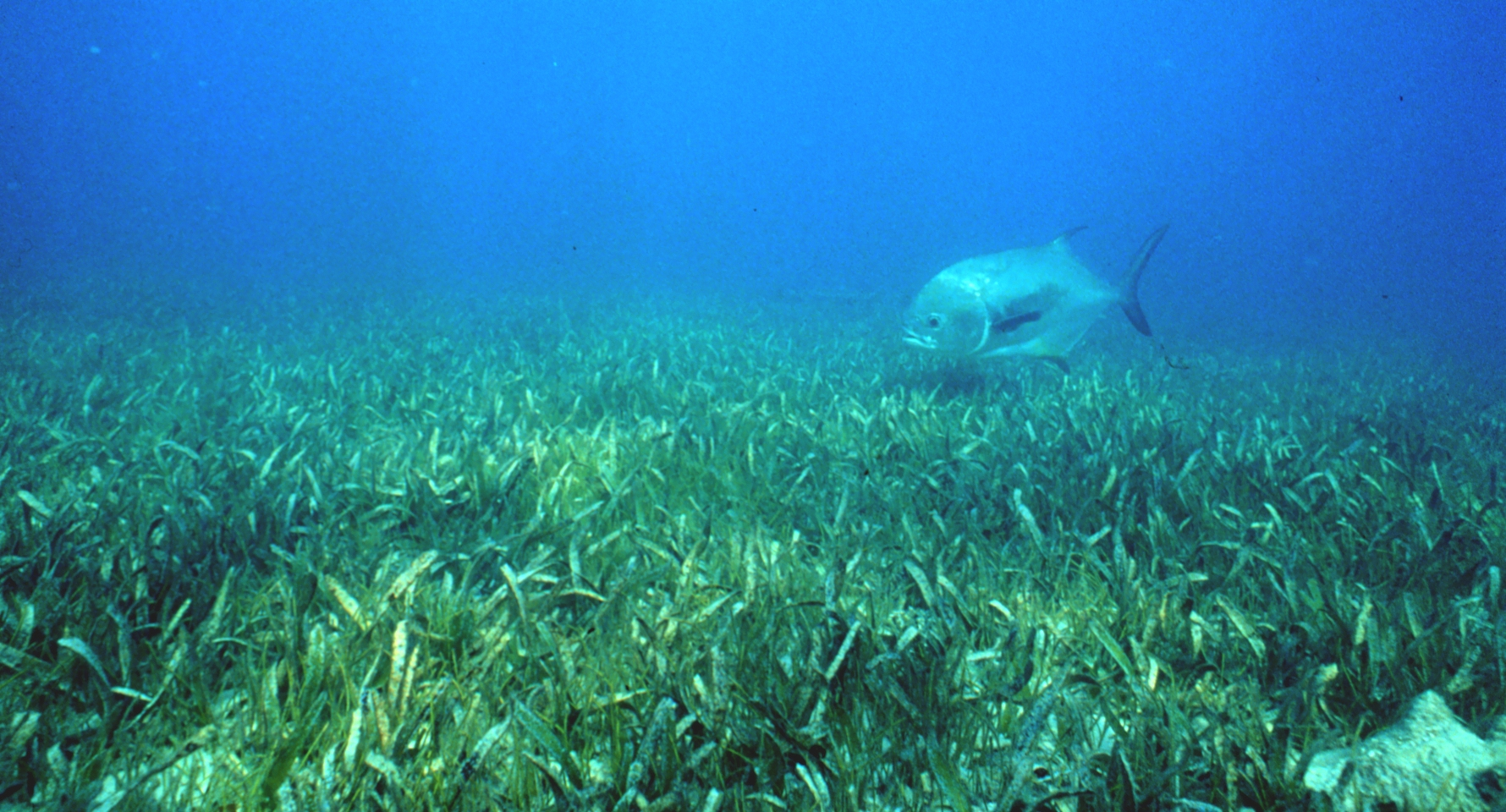
Another, near seagrass in the Florida Keys

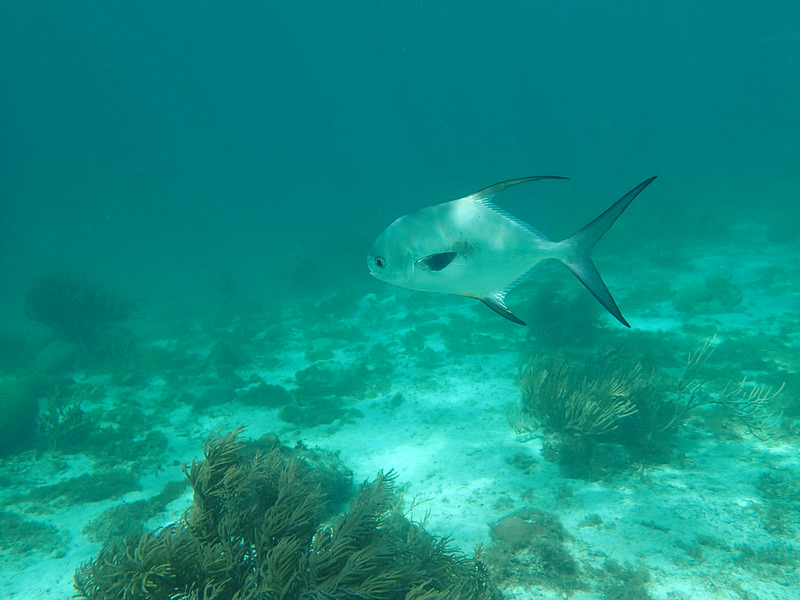
A wild permit off the coast of Belize
