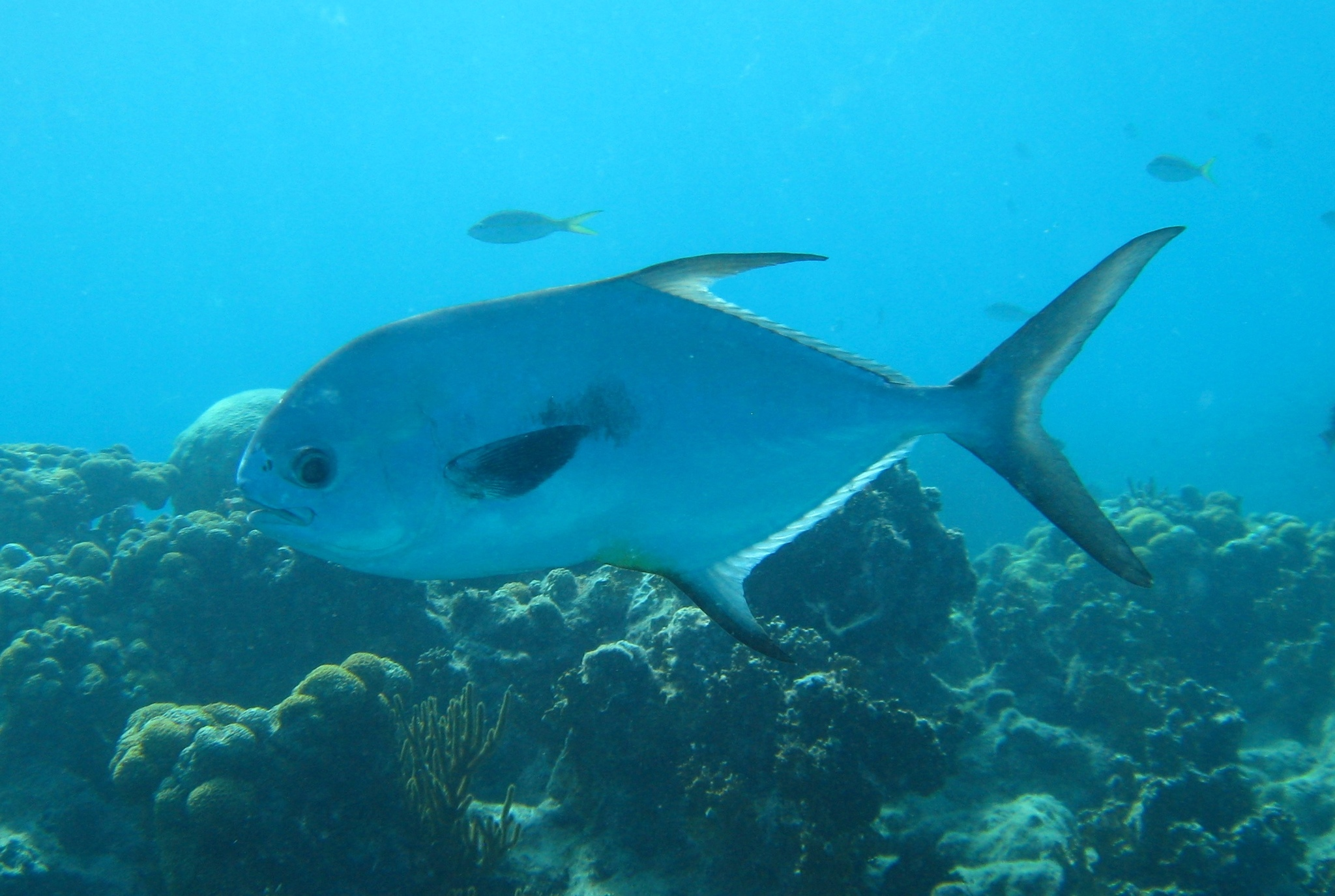
- Trachinotus falcatus

Scientific classification
- Kingdom: Animalia
- Phylum: Chordata
- Class: Actinopterygii
- Division: Teleostei
- Order: Carangiformes
- Suborder: Carangoidei
- Family: Trachinotidae

Subfamilies
- See text

= Trachinotidae =

Family of ray-finned fishes

The Trachinotidae are a family of ray-finned fish in suborder Carangoidei.

== Subfamilies and genera ==
according to Eschmeyer's Catalog of Fishes:

- Subfamily Trachinotinae Gill, 1861
  - Genus Trachinotus Lacépède, 1801
- Subfamily Scomberoidinae Gill, 1890
  - Genus Oligoplites Gill, 1863
  - Genus Parona C. Berg, 1895
  - Genus Scomberoides Lacepède, 1801
  - Genus Lichia Cuvier, 1816
