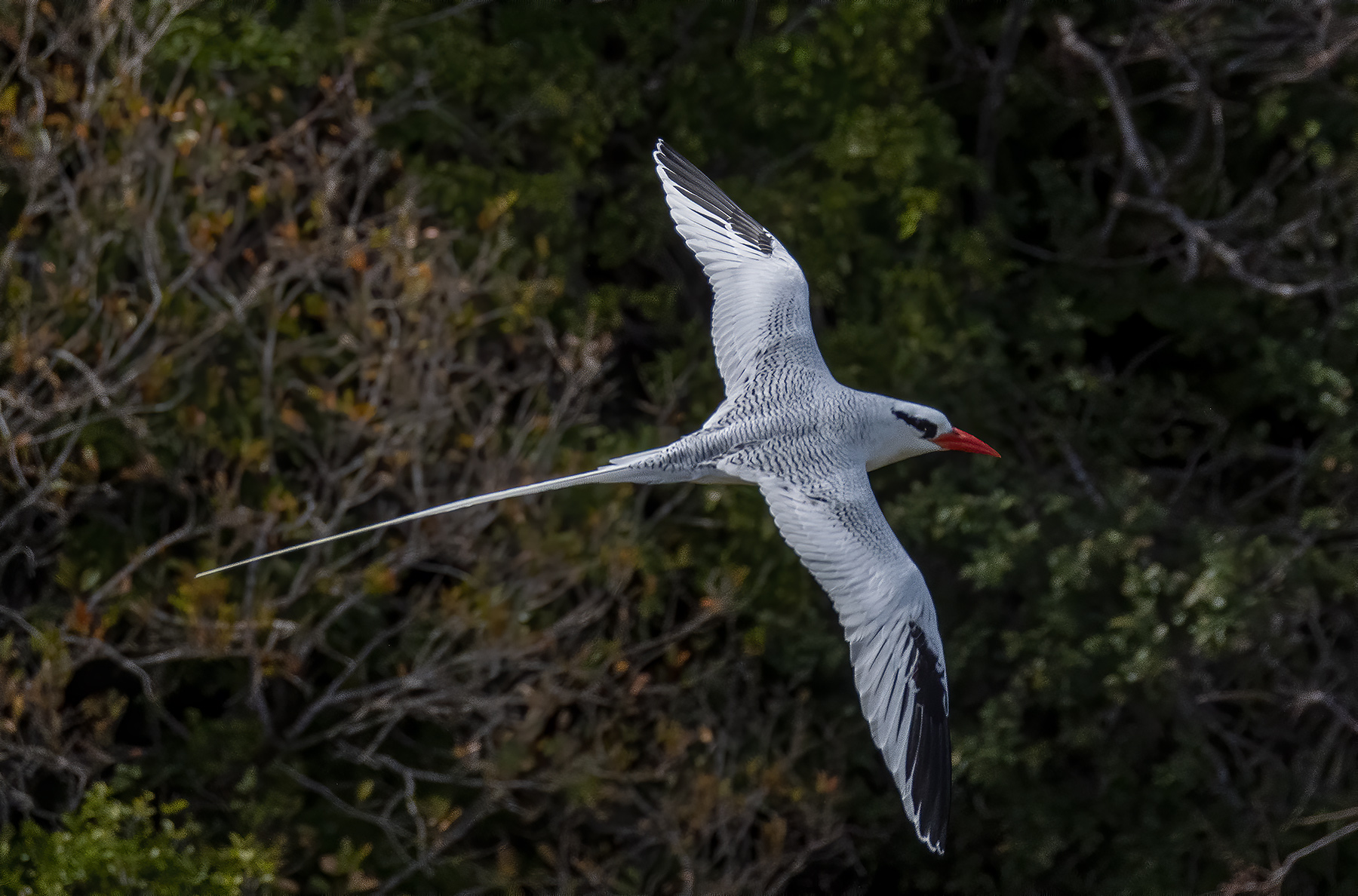
- At Little Tobago Island, Trinidad, and Tobago

Conservation status
- Least Concern (IUCN 3.1)

Scientific classification
- Kingdom: Animalia
- Phylum: Chordata
- Class: Aves
- Order: Phaethontiformes
- Family: Phaethontidae
- Genus: Phaethon
- Species: P. aethereus

Binomial name
- Phaethon aethereus Linnaeus, 1758

= Red-billed tropicbird =

Species of seabird of tropical oceans

The red-billed tropicbird (Phaethon aethereus) is a tropicbird, one of three closely related species of seabird of tropical oceans. Superficially resembling a tern in appearance, it has mostly white plumage with some black markings on the wings and back, a black mask and, as its common name suggests, a red bill. Most adults have tail streamers that are about two times their body length, with those in males being generally longer than those in females. The red-billed tropicbird itself has three subspecies recognized, including the nominate. The subspecies mesonauta is distinguished from the nominate by the rosy tinge of its fresh plumage, and the subspecies indicus can be differentiated by its smaller size, more restricted mask, and more orange bill. This species ranges across the tropical Atlantic, eastern Pacific, and Indian Oceans. The nominate is found in the southern Atlantic Ocean, the subspecies indicus in the waters off of the Middle East and in the Indian Ocean, and the subspecies mesonauta in the eastern portions of both the Atlantic and the Pacific Oceans and in the Caribbean. It was one of the many species described by Carl Linnaeus in his 1758 10th edition of Systema Naturae.

Nesting takes place in loose colonies, as they nest a scrape found on a cliff face that is easy to take off from. A single egg is laid and is incubated by both sexes for about six weeks. Whether the egg hatches or not can be influenced by pollution and weather, although the latter has a minimal effect on whether a chick fledges or not. After a chick fledges, the parents will usually stop visiting the nest and the chick will leave. Birds of all ages feed on fish and squid, catching them by diving from the air into the water. However, the red-billed tropicbird sometimes follows surface-feeding predators. The predators will drive the prey to the surface, which are then seized by the tropicbird.

In some areas, introduced black and brown rats raid nests for eggs and young. Cats also threaten the red-billed tropicbird. This bird is considered to be a least-concern species according to the International Union for Conservation of Nature (IUCN), though populations are thought to be declining. In some places, such as Brazil and Mexico, this bird is considered to be threatened.

== Taxonomy and etymology ==
English naturalist Francis Willughby wrote about the red-billed tropicbird in the 17th century, having seen a specimen held by the Royal Society. It was one of the many bird species originally described by Linnaeus in the landmark 1758 10th edition of his Systema Naturae, and still bears its original scientific name, Phaethon aethereus. The genus name is derived from Ancient Greek phaethon, "sun" while the species name comes from Latin aetherius, "heavenly". This bird is called the red-billed tropicbird due to its red bill and its location in the tropicbird genus. An alternative common name was "bosun bird", also spelt "boatswain bird", from the similarity of its shrill call to a boatswain's whistle. An alternative derivation of the name is from the semblance of the tail feathers to marlin spikes. Local names used in the West Indies include "truphit", "trophic", "white bird", "paille-en-queue", "paille-en-cul", "flèche-en-cul", and "fétu". In a 1945 paper, American ornithologist Waldo Lee McAtee proposed it be called the barred-backed tropicbird after its most distinguishing feature.

The red-billed tropicbird is basal (the earliest offshoot) in the genus Phaethon, the sole extant genus in the family Phaethontidae, the tropicbirds. The split between this tropicbird and the other tropicbirds, the red-tailed and white-tailed tropicbird, is thought to have occurred about six million years ago.

There are three subspecies, including the nominate, of this tropicbird:

Subspecies
Trinomial name	Photograph	Discovery	Range
P. a. aethereus Linnaeus, 1758	A high contrast image of the nominate, taken from behind the bird while it is on the ground, can be seen.	The nominate subspecies, described in 1758 by Linnaeus.	Central Atlantic (breeding on islands south of the equator)
P. a. mesonauta J. L. Peters, 1930	The subspecies mesonauta can be seen flying over water.	In 1930, James L. Peters described this subspecies from an adult female specimen from Almirante Bay, Panama. He noted the greater primary coverts were more wholly black than those of the nominate taxon, which were edged with white. In the same paper, he described P. a. limatus from a specimen collected on the Galápagos Islands. He reported this taxon resembled P. a. mesonauta but had a yellower bill. Peters insisted this color was not an artefact of preservation. The latter subspecies is not recognized as distinct by the IOC.	East Pacific, Caribbean, and East Atlantic.
P. a. indicus A. O. Hume, 1876	A red-billed tropicbird, subspecies indicus, can be seen flying. It has a less extensive mask and a more orangey bill than the nominate.	Allan Octavian Hume wrote of this taxon in 1876 after shooting a bird near Cherbaniani Reef off the Indian west coast. He noted that the Indian Ocean birds were smaller overall than the nominate subspecies, and tentatively classified it as a separate species.	Persian Gulf, Gulf of Aden, Red Sea.

== Description ==
The red-billed tropicbird measures 90 to 105 cm (35 to 41 in) on average, which includes the 46 to 56 cm (18 to 22 in)-long tail streamers. Without them the tropicbird measures about 48 cm (19 in). It has a wingspan of 99 to 106 cm (39 to 42 in). In overall appearance it is tern-like in shape. Its plumage is white, with black wing tips, and a back that is finely barred in black. It has a black mask that extends up from just above the lores to the sides of its nape, with gray mottling usually seen near the nape and hindneck. The tail has black shaft streaks, as do tail streamers. The underparts are white, with some black on the outermost primaries and tertials and occasionally with black markings on the flanks. The iris is blackish-brown, and the bill is red. The legs, base of the central toe, and parts of the outer toes are orange-yellow while the rest of the feet are black. Although the sexes are similar, the males are generally larger than females, with the tail streamers being around 12 cm (4.7 in) longer on the male than on the female.

The subspecies of this bird can usually be distinguished by their difference in size and plumage. The subspecies Phaethon aethereus mesonauta can be differentiated by its slightly rosy tinge when its plumage is fresh, the bolder look of the black barring on the upper wing, and the more solid look of the black on the outer wing. The subspecies P. a. indicus can be distinguished by its smaller size, its smaller mask on the face, which often does not extend far behind the eye, and its more orange bill with a black cutting edge.

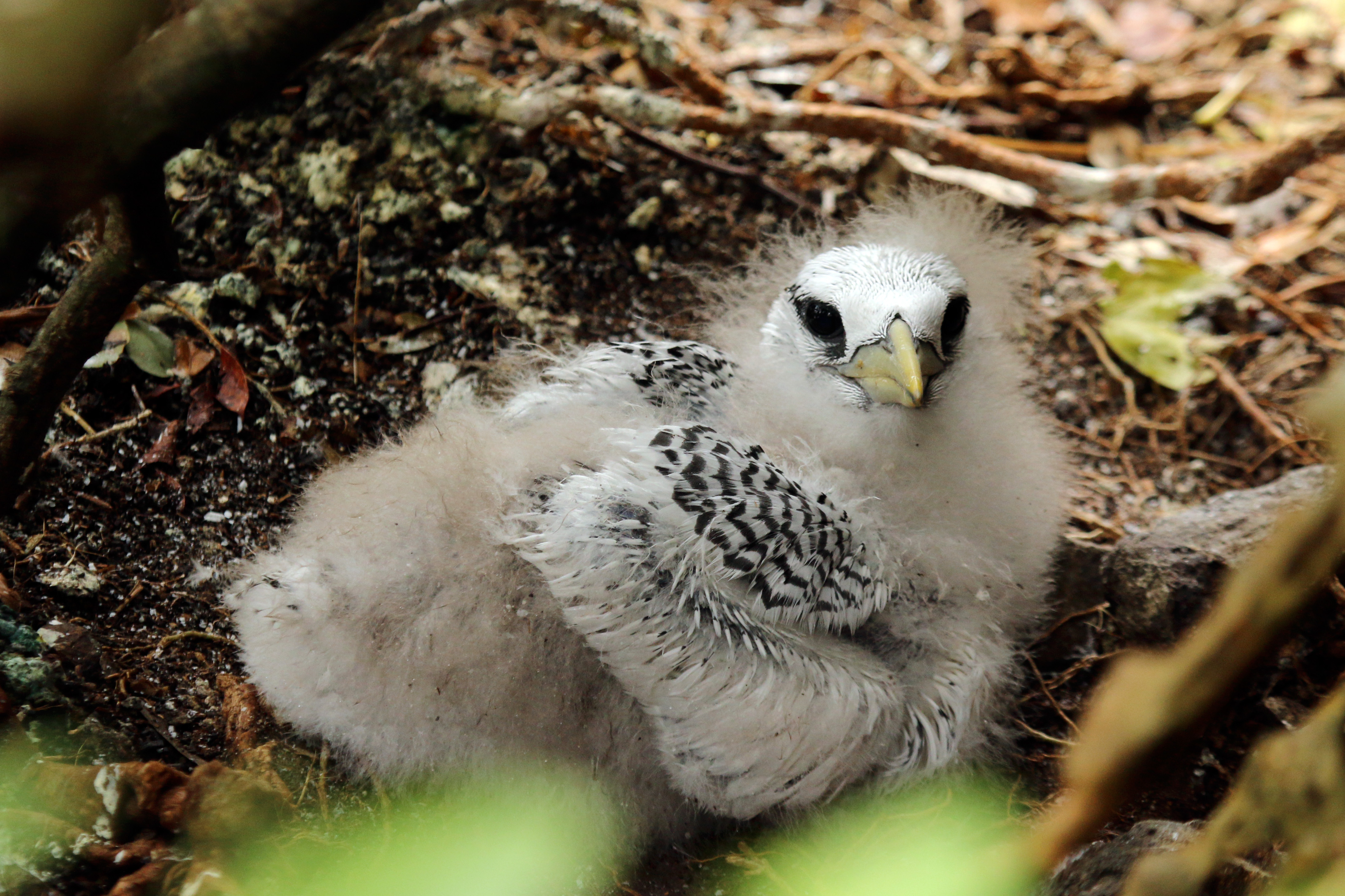
P. a. mesonauta chick, Little Tobago

When the chicks hatch, they are covered with gray down. This down is eventually cleared in about 40 to 50 days. The young chicks lack tail streamers. The juvenile looks similar to the adult with a mostly white crown. In the juvenile, the stripes above the eye usually are connected at the nape. The tail feathers usually have black tips or subterminal dots and without the tail streamers that are distinctive on the adult. Occasionally, a juvenile will have black markings on its flanks and under tail coverts.

The red-billed tropicbird can be differentiated from the other tropicbirds by its red bill in combination with its white tail streamers. The slightly smaller red-tailed tropicbird has red rather than white tail streamers, and the white-tailed tropicbird can be differentiated by its smaller size, black stripe along its upper wing coverts, and its yellow-orange bill. Juvenile red-billed tropicbirds have more heavily barred upper parts than juveniles of other species. In flight, the royal tern can be confused with the adult red-billed tropicbird but can be distinguished by the former's less direct flight pattern and its lack of tail streamers.

This tropicbird moults once every year as an adult, following a complex basic strategy. This prebasic moult is completed before courtship and lasts between 19 and 29 weeks, with most being completed in 24 weeks. Birds gain their adult plumage at two to three years of age.

The red-billed tropicbird usually only calls near breeding colonies, where it joins in with groups of other adults, numbering from 2 to 20, in circling above the sea and making loud, harsh kreeeee-kreeeee-kri-kri-kri-kr screams. If disturbed at the nest, the chicks will vocalize a loud and piercing shriek, either rasping or reeling.

== Distribution and habitat ==
The red-billed tropicbird has the smallest range of the three tropicbird species, yet it still ranges across the Neotropics, as well as the tropical Atlantic, eastern Pacific, and Indian oceans. The nominate subspecies Phaethon aethereus aethereus breeds on islands in the Atlantic south of the equator, including Ascension, and Saint Helena on the Mid-Atlantic Ridge, and Fernando de Noronha and Abrolhos Archipelago in Brazilian waters. It is a vagrant to the coastline of Namibia and South Africa. The subspecies P. a. mesonauta is found in the east Atlantic, the east Pacific, and in the Caribbean. This subspecies was restricted to the Cape Verde Islands in the eastern Atlantic but it has colonised the Canary Islands in the 21st century, especially Fuerteventura but also on other islands in that archipelago. The Indian Ocean subspecies, P. a. indicus is found in waters off Pakistan, western India, southwestern Sri Lanka, the Horn of Africa and Arabian Peninsula. The subspecies is also a rare but regular vagrant to Seychelles.

Within the West Indies, this species is most common in the Lesser Antilles, Virgin Islands and small islands east of Puerto Rico. Breeding in the Western Palearctic occurs on the Cape Verde Islands and the Îles des Madeleines off Senegal. In 2000, the total number of pairs there was probably less than 150. In the Pacific Ocean, it breeds from the Gulf of California and Revillagigedo Islands, Mexico in the north, to the Galápagos Islands, Isla Plata, Ecuador and San Lorenzo Island, Peru. Researchers Larry Spear and David Ainley estimated the minimum population of the Pacific at around 15,750 birds in 1995 after 15 years of field observations. Red-billed tropicbirds disperse widely when not breeding, the juveniles more so than the adults, with birds in the Pacific reaching the 45th parallel north off Washington State and 32nd parallel south off Chile, with 19 records as of 2007 from Hawaii—some 4,300 kilometers (2,700 mi) from Mexico. It sometimes wanders further, including five records from Great Britain, and two from Australia: October–December 2010 on Lord Howe Island and September 2014 on Ashmore Reef. In July 2005, one was found in eastern New Brunswick, Canada, likely the same bird that later visited Seal Island and Matinicus Rock, Maine every summer from 2005 to 2021.

== Behavior ==
The red-billed tropicbird can reach speeds of 44 kilometers per hour (27 mph) when flying out at sea, cruising a minimum of 30 meters (100 ft) above the sea. It cannot stand and is not proficient at walking, and requires an unobstructed takeoff to fly from land. Conversely it can lift off the sea without much effort. Its plumage is waterproof and it floats on water.

=== Breeding ===
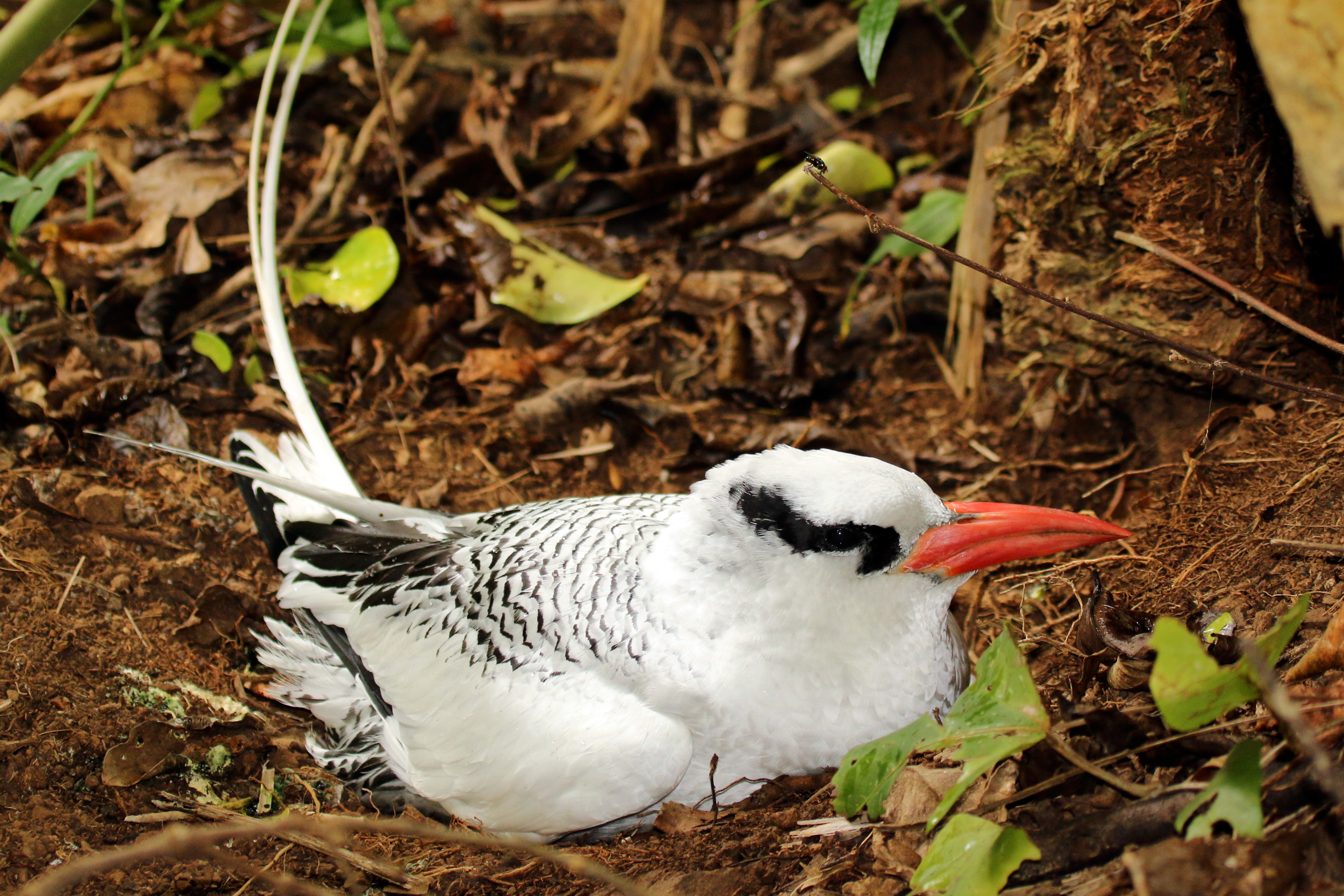
P. a. mesonauta, nesting, Little Tobago

The red-billed tropicbird usually nests on isolated cliff faces, in loose colonies. It uses a simple scrape nest, located in a place it can easily take off from. The age of first breeding is usually five years, although this age is variable; a three-year-old tropicbird was once seen breeding. In some locations, breeding happens year-round, while in others, breeding occurs seasonally. For example, for islands in the California Current, breeding starts in November or December, while it occurs year round in the Galápagos. Breeding is influenced by the availability of food, with an increase in food generally causing an increase in breeding. Individually, this bird only breeds every nine to twelve months. A breeding bird usually returns to its partner and nest location from the previous breeding cycle.

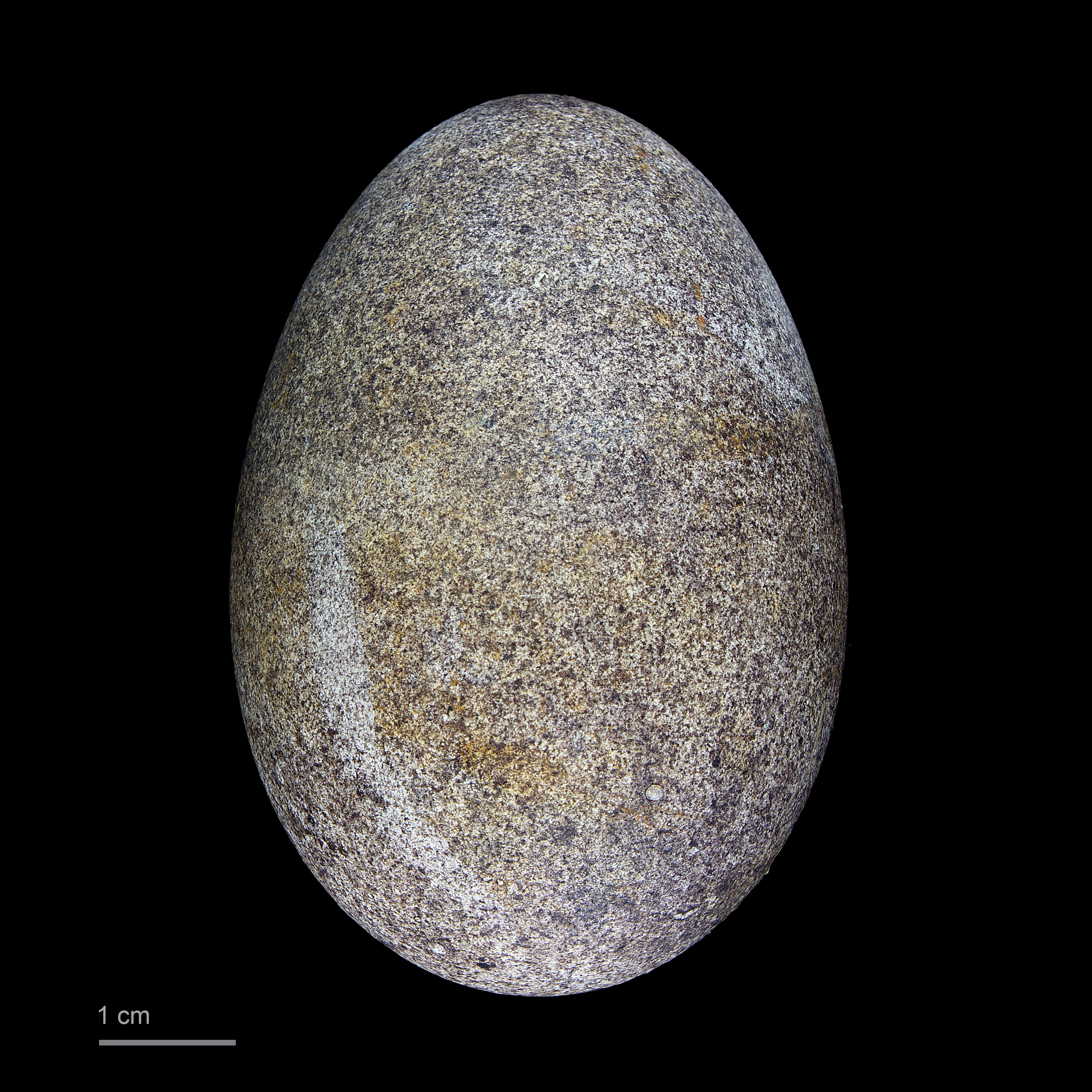
Red-billed tropicbird egg

Courtship and pairing usually lasts three to five weeks, during which this bird performs aerial courtship displays to potential mates. The courtship displays include flying in the air which takes the form of gliding interspersed with short periods of rapid wing-beating. In one display, a pair glide together for 100–300 meters (330–980 ft), with one bird around 30 cm (12 in) above the other. The upper bird bends its wings down and the lower lifts its up, so they are almost touching. The two sink to about 6 meters (20 ft) above the sea before breaking off.

At nest sites, battles sometimes occur between two or more pairs before the original owners declare themselves as the owner of the nest. Red-billed tropicbirds are aggressive at nest sites, fighting with each other and ousting species such as shearwaters, petrels, and white-tailed tropicbirds. They have also been recorded taking over nests of white-tailed tropicbirds and raising their young if they failed to destroy their eggs. Vagrant red-billed tropicbirds have been implicated in egg loss in red-tailed tropicbird nests in Hawaii.

This tropicbird usually lays a clutch of one white buff to pale purple egg with reddish-brown spots. The egg usually measures 45 by 60 millimeters (1.8 by 2.4 in) and weighs around 67 grams (2.4 oz)—10% of the adult female's weight. It is incubated by both sexes for 42 to 46 days. If the egg does not survive the first few days in the nest, the female will usually lay a replacement egg. The chicks that hatch eventually fledge in about 10 to 15 weeks after hatching, although most fledge after about 80 to 90 days. Normally, the maximum weight of the chicks is about 725 grams (1.6 lb), but on years that are hotter than average, this can drop to about 600 grams (1.3 lb).

Born helpless and unable to move around (nidicolous and semi-altricial), the chicks are constantly brooded by the parents until they are 3 to 5 days old, when they can thermoregulate their body temperature. They grow their first feathers—scapulars—at 13–15 days, followed by primaries at 24–27 days, tail feathers at 30–35 days and are fully feathered by 55 days. They are attended by the parents more between the 30th and 60th days; a behavior possibly related to the greater food requirements of the chicks during those days. Semi-digested food is regurgitated and then fed to younger birds, with older birds being fed solid food. The parents can be seen at normal rates with the chicks up to about the 70th day, after which the attendance by the parents falls rapidly. Chicks receive no care after fledging, with only about one out of seven chicks receiving food after the 80th day, and almost no chicks are visited after about 90 days. After fledging, the chicks will leave the nest, with few remaining after about 100 days.

=== Feeding ===
Although it is a poor swimmer, the red-billed tropicbird feeds on fish and squid. The fish are usually small, between about 10 and 20 cm (4 and 8 in), although some caught are up to 30 cm (12 in). The aquatic prey is mostly caught by diving into the water from the air, although flying fish, the preferred fish of this species, are sometimes caught while in the air. Fish species eaten include Pacific thread herring (Opisthonema libertate); various flying fish such as the sharpchin (Fodiator acutus), Hirundichthys spp., the sailfin (Parexocoetus brachypterus), the ornamented (Cypselurus callopterus), the closely related bigwing halfbeak (Oxyporhamphus micropterus) and longfin halfbeak (Hemiramphus saltator), and the tropical two-wing flying fish (Exocoetus volitans); the redlip blenny (Ophioblennius atlanticus), squirrelfish (Holocentrus adscensionis), mackerel scad (Decapterus macarellus), shortjaw leatherjacket (Oligoplites refulgens), and true mackerels (Scomber spp.). Squid eaten include the glass squid (Hyaloteuthis pelagica).

As they grow, the chicks are fed increasingly larger quantities of fish and squid by their parents, generally partly digested and regurgitated. Most fish that the chicks are fed are below 6 cm (2.4 in) in length, although some fish fed to larger chicks can be up to 30 cm (12 in) in length.

This species of tropicbird usually forages alone. It usually dives into waters away from the coastline, diving from the air, at heights up to 40 meters (130 ft). It will usually hover over the water before diving. Sometimes, this bird follows predators that feed near the surface, such as dolphins or tuna. The red-billed tropicbird will feed on the fish driven either to or above the surface by the aforementioned predators. It usually forages in warmer waters, though does hunt in areas of cooler currents such as the Gulf of California. The species has also been recorded foraging in salt wedge estuaries.

== Relationship with humans ==
The red-billed tropicbird, a bird not indigenous to Bermuda, was displayed in error on the $50 Bermudian dollar and was replaced in 2012 by the white-tailed tropicbird, the tropicbird that can be found in Bermuda.

== Status ==
Accurate assessment of red-billed tropicbird numbers is difficult due to the remote locations of nesting sites and vast areas of the sea where they might be found. This bird is considered to be a least-concern species according to the IUCN. This is due to the fact that the range, declination, and numbers of this species, although small, do not meet the criteria required to be considered a vulnerable species. The range of this species is believed to be 86.3 million square kilometers (33.3 million mi^{2}), with an estimated 3,300 to 13,000 mature individuals. In the western Atlantic, a more precise number was given for the population there in 2000; about 4,000 to 5,000 pairs. The population is declining, mainly due to human exploitation of the bird's environment and predation by invasive species, such as rats. These predators have the potential to drive populations of the red-billed tropicbird into serious decline. It is estimated that this bird experienced a population bottleneck about 450 to 750 years ago, likely due to exploitation by humans. This has resulted in low genetic diversity in this tropicbird, which makes the likelihood of it adapting to sudden environmental changes low. In Mexico and Brazil, it is considered to be threatened.

=== Threats and survival ===
The eggs and chicks of red-billed tropicbirds are prey for both brown and black rats in places like Abrolhos Archipelago, where these rats are invasive species. Feral cats are also predators of breeding tropicbirds, with the birds providing about 3% of the diet of the cats in locations such as the Caribbean island Saba. On Saba, the problem has only arisen since about 2000. On Ascension Island, the effect of the eradication of feral cats was the increase of the red-billed tropicbird population there by about 1.6% in a year. On the Galápagos Islands, the short-eared owl (Asio flammeus) occasionally eats young birds. Toxoplasma gondii, an intracellular parasite, can be found in this bird. About 28% of red-billed tropicbirds produce antibodies for T. gondii.

Under normal conditions about 75% of the eggs hatch. Hatching success can drop to about 35% in unusually hot conditions. Egg shell thinning, a potential cause of egg mortality, can be caused by pollutants. About 78% of chicks fledge in normal years, with that percentage only dropping slightly, to 77%, in abnormally hot years. Most egg and chick mortality during periods of normal climate is caused by nest fights between the parents and other birds. Breeding adults usually survive the year, with only about 18% dying every year. The young have a lower survival rate, with about 29% dying each year. The lifespan of this bird is anywhere from 16 to 30 years.
