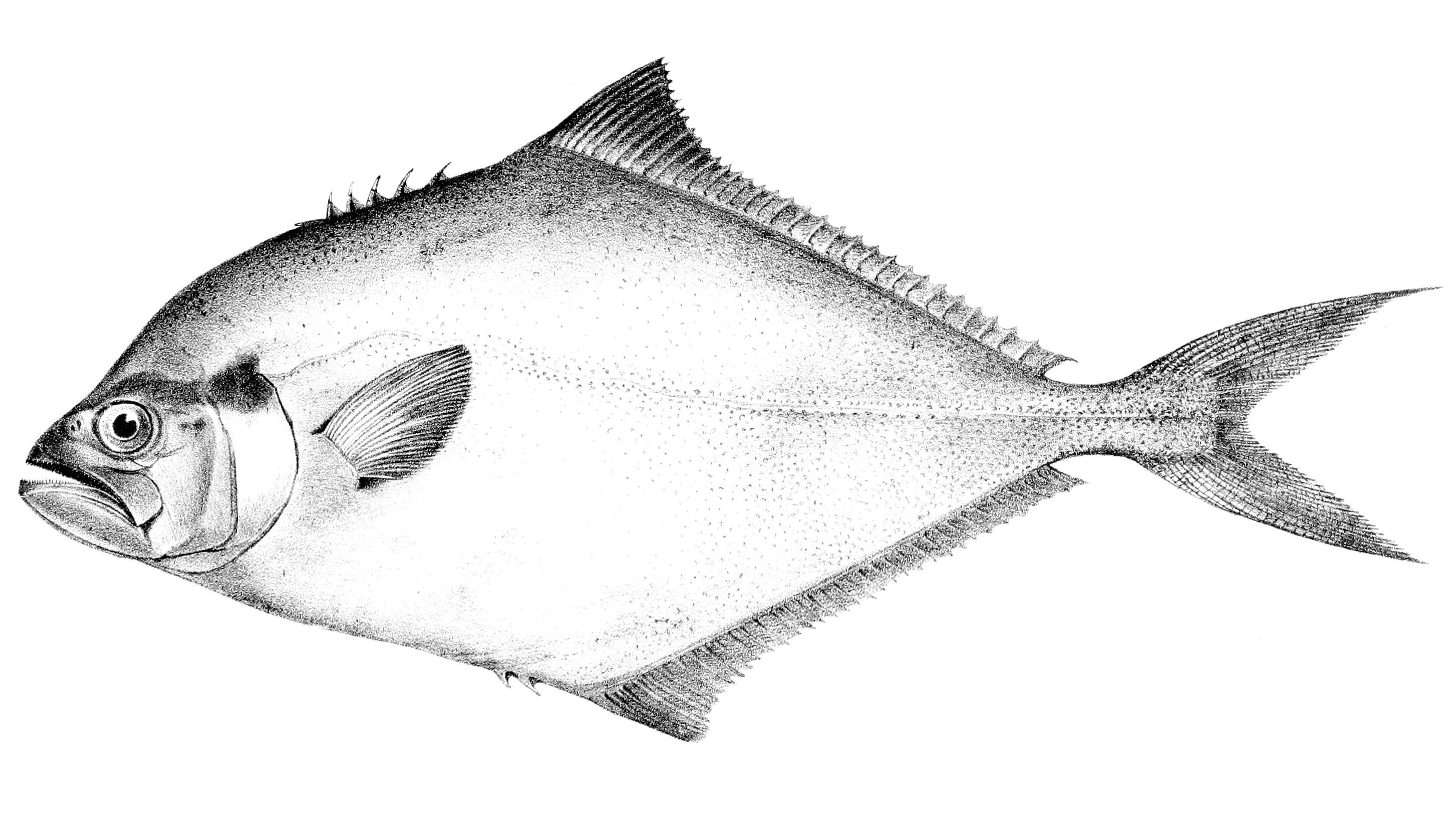

Conservation status
- Least Concern (IUCN 3.1)

Scientific classification
- Kingdom: Animalia
- Phylum: Chordata
- Class: Actinopterygii
- Division: Teleostei
- Order: Carangiformes
- Suborder: Carangoidei
- Family: Trachinotidae
- Subfamily: Scomberoidinae
- Genus: Parona; C. Berg, 1895
- Species: P. signata

Binomial name
- Parona signata (Jenyns, 1841)

Synonyms
- Paropsis signata Jenyns, 1841

= Parona leatherjacket =

Species of ray-finned fish

The parona leatherjacket (Parona signata) is a species of carangiform ray-finned fish found along the Atlantic coast of South America from southern Brazil to southern Argentina and the Falkland Islands. This species grows to a length of 60 centimetres (24 in) TL and is of minor importance to local commercial fisheries. This species is the only known member of its genus.
