= Hemiramphus archipelagicus =

Jumping halfbeak

Scientific classification
- Domain: Eukaryota
- Kingdom: Animalia
- Phylum: Chordata
- Class: Actinopterygii
- Order: Beloniformes
- Family: Hemiramphidae
- Genus: Hemiramphus
- Species: H. archipelagicus

Binomial name
- Hemiramphus archipelagicus Collette & Parin, 1978

Synonyms
- Hemiramphus marginatus (non Forsskål, 1775) misapplied

Species of fish

The jumping halfbeak (Hemiramphus archipelagicus), is a reef-associated marine species of fish in the family Hemiramphidae. It is a valued commercial fish in tropical countries both dried salted and fresh forms.

== Description ==
The body shows typical halfbeak shape with an elongated lower jaw and cylindrical elongated body. They have no spines on fins, but do have 12-15 rays of their dorsal fins and 10-13 rays on their anal fins. The longest recorded Jumping halfbeak was 34 cm long. There are no vertical bars on sides of the body as other halfbeaks.

== Distribution and habitat ==
The Jumping halfbeak is found tropical waters Indo-Pacific oceans extends from Western India, around Sri Lanka, Thailand, the Philippines, New Guinea to western Polynesia. It is found among the water plants and shallow coastal waters.

== See also ==
- List of common commercial fish of Sri Lanka
