= Ballyhoo =

- Off the coast of Cuba

Conservation status
- Least Concern (IUCN 3.1)

Scientific classification
- Kingdom: Animalia
- Phylum: Chordata
- Class: Actinopterygii
- Division: Teleostei
- Order: Beloniformes
- Family: Hemiramphidae
- Genus: Hemiramphus
- Species: H. brasiliensis

Binomial name
- Hemiramphus brasiliensis (Linnaeus, 1758)
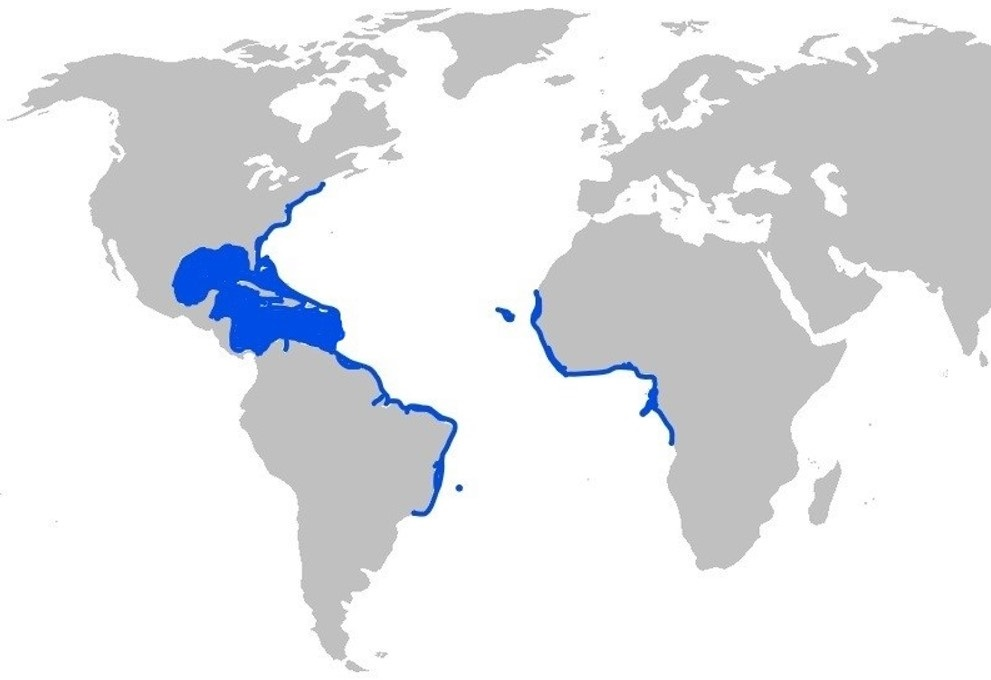
- native range

Synonyms
- Esox brasiliensis Linnaeus, 1758; Hemiramphus brownii Valenciennes, 1847; Macrognathus brevirostris Gronow, 1854; Hemirhamphus filamentosus Poey, 1860

Species of fish

The ballyhoo halfbeak, ballyhoo, balahu, redtailed balao or yellowtail ballyhoo (Hemiramphus brasiliensis) is a baitfish of the halfbeak family (Hemiramphidae). It is similar to the Balao halfbeak (H. balao) in most features. Some are used for trolling by saltwater anglers. Some have caused ciguatera poisoning in humans.

== Description ==
The body shows typical halfbeak shape with an elongated lower jaw and cylindrical elongated body. They have no spines on fins, but do have 13–14 rays of their dorsal fins and 12–13 rays on their anal fins. The longest recorded Jumping halfbeak was 55 cm long, but most do not exceed 35 cm. There is no ridge between nostril and eye. It feeds mainly on sea grasses and small fish.

== Distribution and habitat ==
Ballyhoo are distributed in tropical-warm temperate latitudes on both sides of the Atlantic. In Florida, they inhabit shallow bank areas or grassflats associated with coral reefs.

Close-up.
