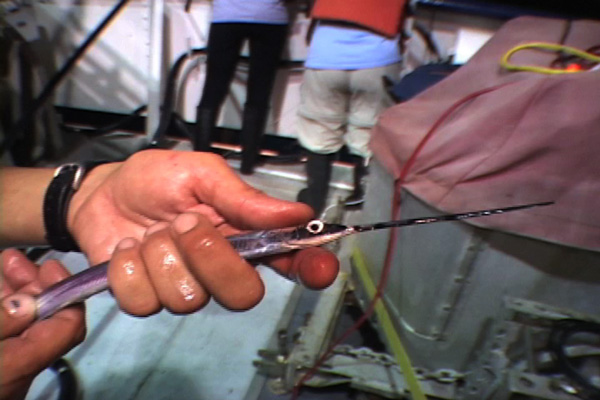

Conservation status
- Least Concern (IUCN 3.1)

Scientific classification
- Kingdom: Animalia
- Phylum: Chordata
- Class: Actinopterygii
- Order: Beloniformes
- Family: Hemiramphidae
- Genus: Hemiramphus
- Species: H. balao

Binomial name
- Hemiramphus balao Lesueur, 1821

Synonyms
- Hemiramphus guineensis Bleeker, 1863; Hemiramphus pleii Valenciennes, 1847; Hemiramphus vittatus Valenciennes, 1843; Hemiramphus macrochirus Poey, 1860

= Balao halfbeak =

Species of fish

The balao halfbeak (Hemiramphus balao), occasionally called the balao for short, is an ocean-going species of fish in the family Hemiramphidae. It was first described by French naturalist Charles Alexandre Lesueur in 1821. They are used as cut bait and for trolling purposes by saltwater sportsmen.

== Description ==
The balao halfbeak is similar in appearance to its relative the ballyhoo (H. brasiliensis). The main difference between the two is that the distance from the nares to the base of the pectoral fin is greater than the length of the ballyhoo's pectoral fin, while that difference is less than the length of the balao halfbeak's pectoral fin. They have no spines on their fins, but do have 11–15 rays on their dorsal fins and 10–13 rays on their anal fins. Balao halfbeaks have blue-gray skin on their backs, while their undersides are silver or white. The longest recorded balao halfbeak was 40 cm long.

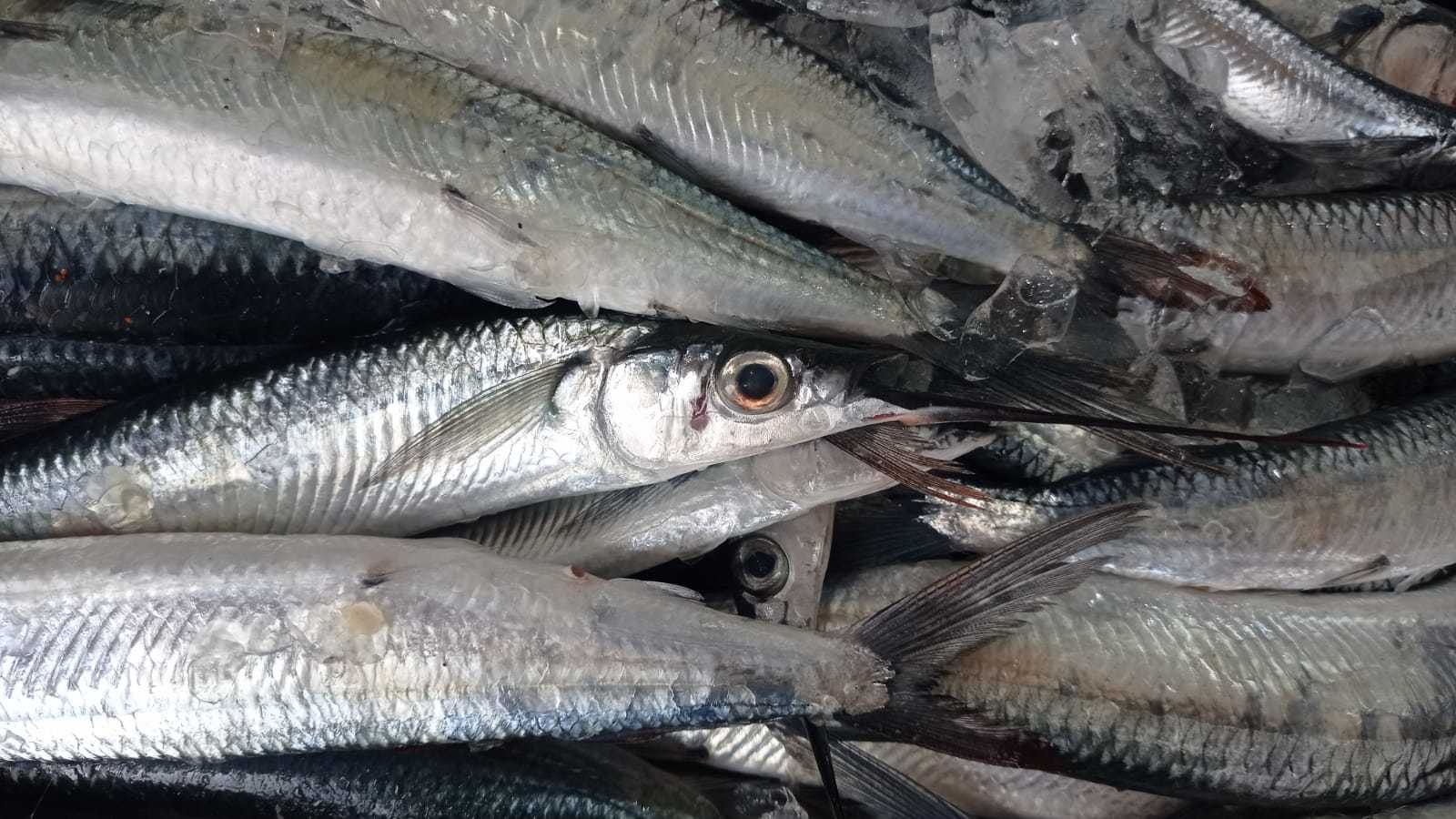
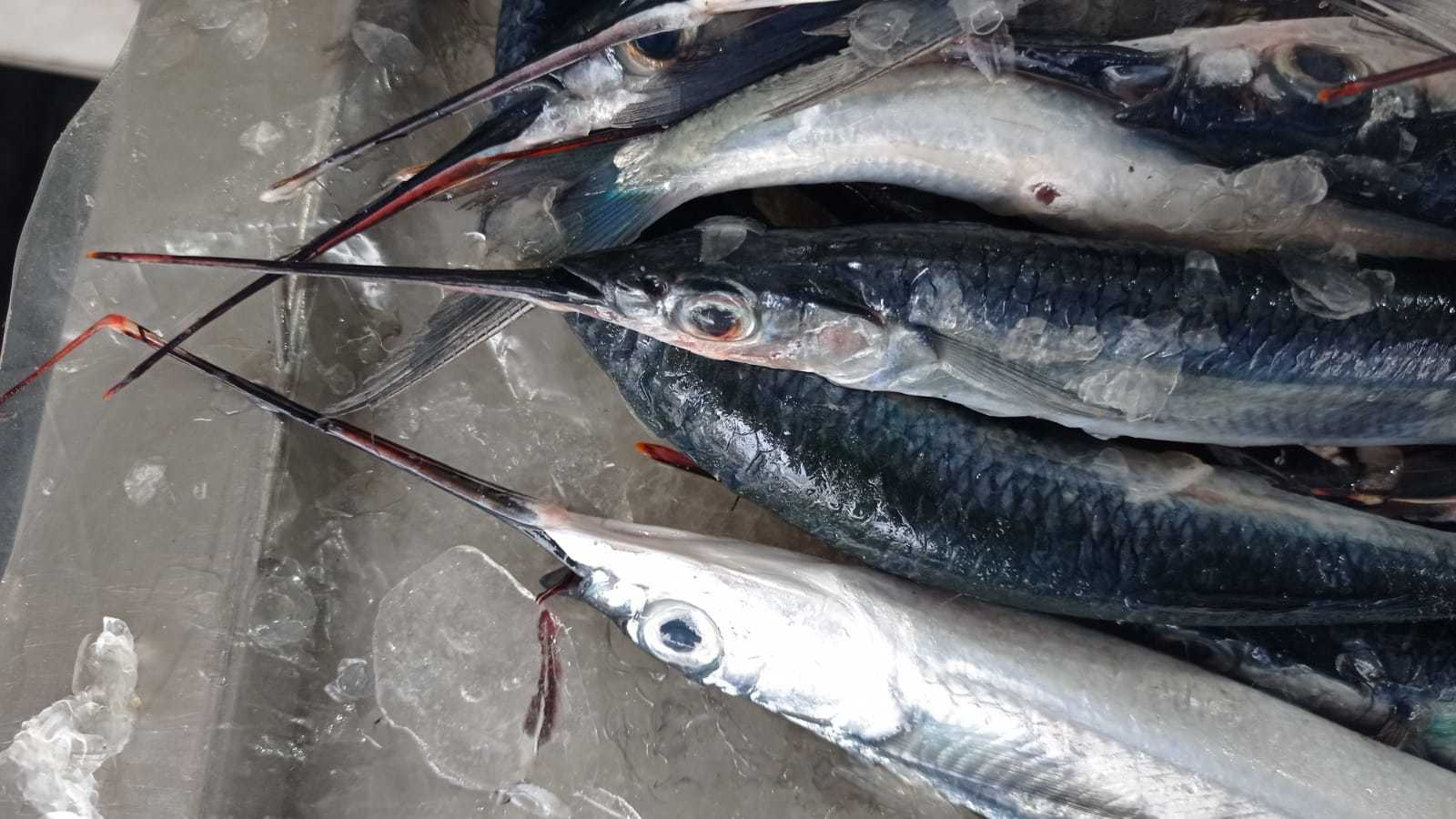
In Rio de Janeiro, Brazil

== Distribution and habitat ==
Balao halfbeaks are found only in the Atlantic Ocean. In the west, they are known from New York south to Brazil, including much of the Gulf of Mexico and the Caribbean. In the eastern Atlantic, they are known from the Canary Islands and the Gulf of Guinea from Victoria, Nigeria to Luanda, Angola. Balao halfbeak have also been recorded from Côte d'Ivoire.

Balao halfbeaks can form fairly large schools, in which they feed on smaller fishes and zooplankton. They can be found in both brackish and marine waters and are associated with reefs. Although they are mainly used by humans as baitfish for sailfish and marlin, they are also used as food in the West Indies. Balao halfbeaks are also preyed upon by the brown noddy and the sooty tern.
