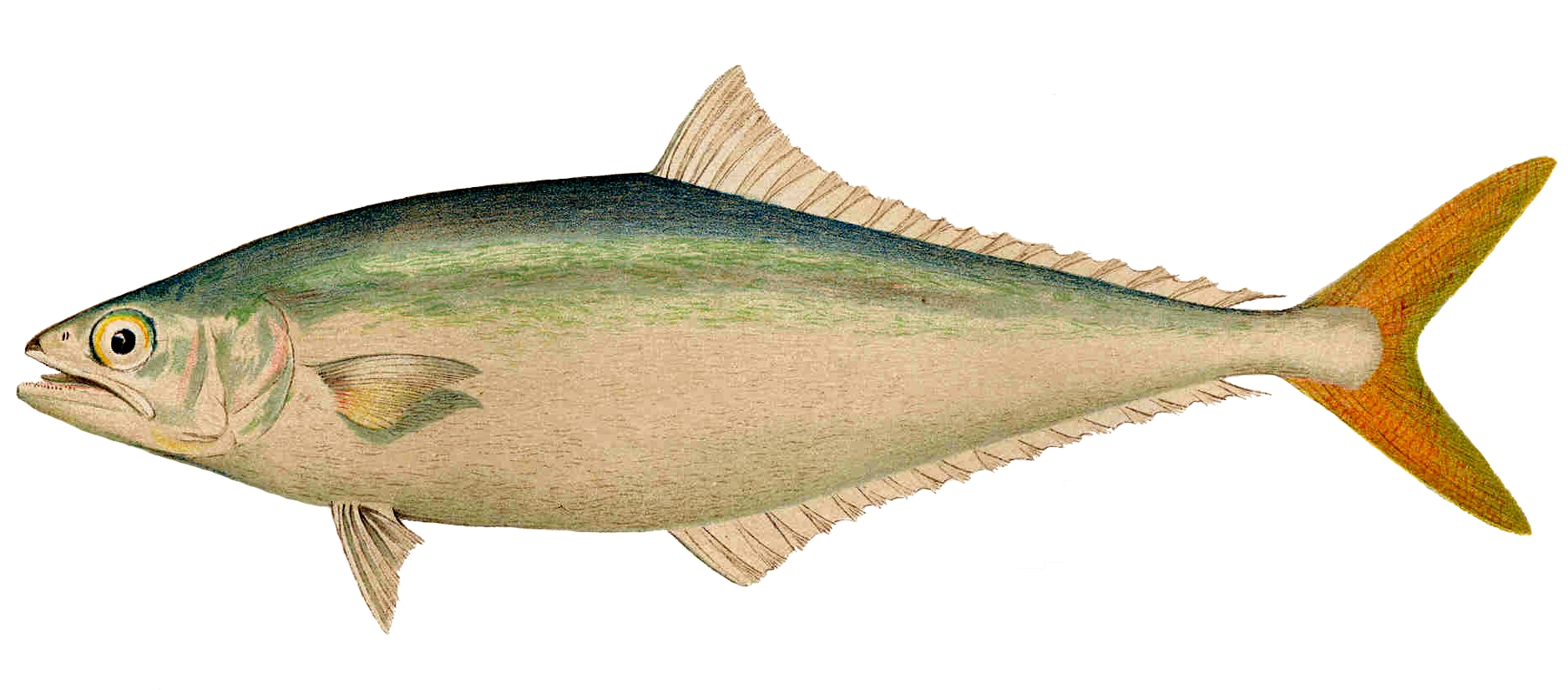

Conservation status
- Least Concern (IUCN 3.1)

Scientific classification
- Kingdom: Animalia
- Phylum: Chordata
- Class: Actinopterygii
- Order: Carangiformes
- Suborder: Carangoidei
- Family: Trachinotidae
- Genus: Oligoplites
- Species: O. saurus

Binomial name
- Oligoplites saurus (Bloch & J. G. Schneider, 1801)

Synonyms
- List: Scomber saurus Bloch & Schneider, 1801; Oligoplites inornatus Gill, 1863; Oligoplites saurus saurus (Bloch & Schneider, 1801); Oligoplites saurus inornatus Gill, 1863

= Leatherjacket fish =

Species of ray-finned fish

The leatherjacket fish (Oligoplites saurus), also known as leather jack, is a species of ray-finned fish in the family Trachinotidae. Leather jack may also refer to other members of Carangiformes, such as the pilot fish. The largest are about a foot long.

== Distribution ==
There are two subspecies of Oligoplites saurus. The nominate subspecies O.s. saurus distributed in the western Atlantic Ocean from Chatham, Massachusetts south along the U.S. coast, throughout the Gulf of Mexico and Caribbean Sea, and along the South American coast to Rio Grande do Sul, Brazil. The other subspecies O. s. inornatus is found in the eastern Pacific Ocean from southern Baja California, much of the Gulf of California to Ecuador, including the Galapagos and Malpelo Islands.

== Feeding ==
It voraciously devours small fish and shrimp, often in company with larger predatory species. Leatherjackets feed on small fish including the silver perch.

== As food ==
Traditionally, the leather jacket has not been eaten, but recently, with large-scale farming of the fish, it has become common at market. The fish has a mild, oily taste similar to Spanish mackerel or bluefish.

It has occasionally been the prey to blue swimmer crab, as juvenile fish in sea grass beds.
