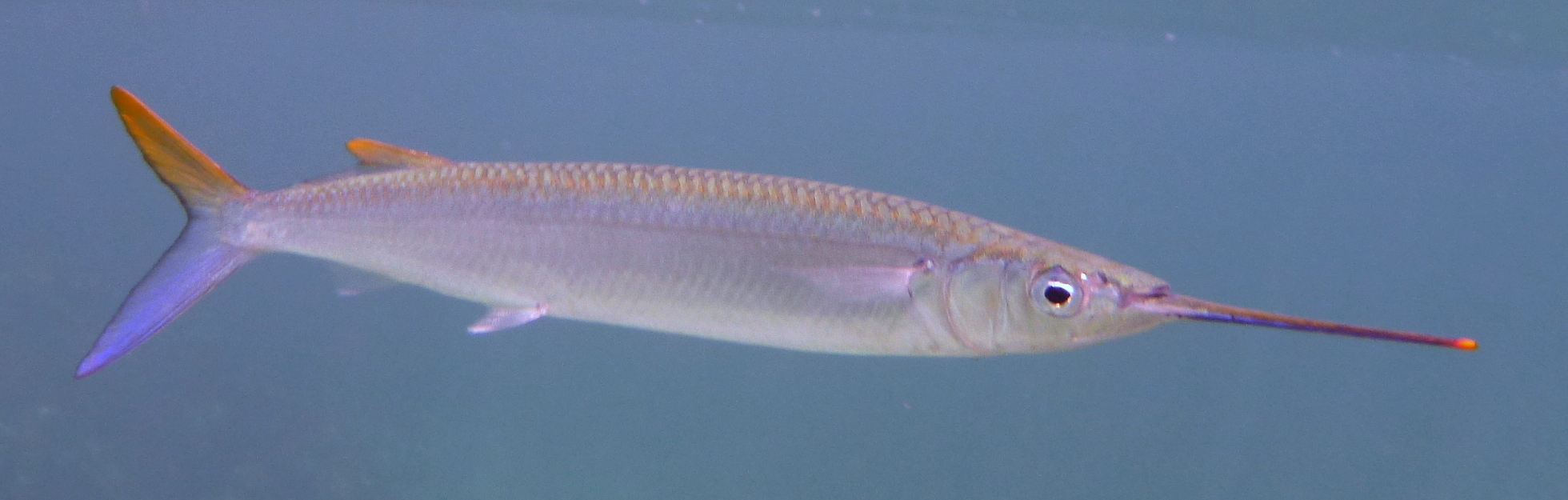
- Hemiramphus brasiliensis

Scientific classification
- Kingdom: Animalia
- Phylum: Chordata
- Class: Actinopterygii
- Order: Beloniformes
- Family: Hemiramphidae
- Genus: Hemiramphus; G. Cuvier, 1816

Type species
- Esox brasiliensis Linnaeus, 1758

Species
- See text.

Synonyms
- Ardeapiscis Whitley, 1931; Farhians Whitley, 1930

= Hemiramphus =

Genus of fishes

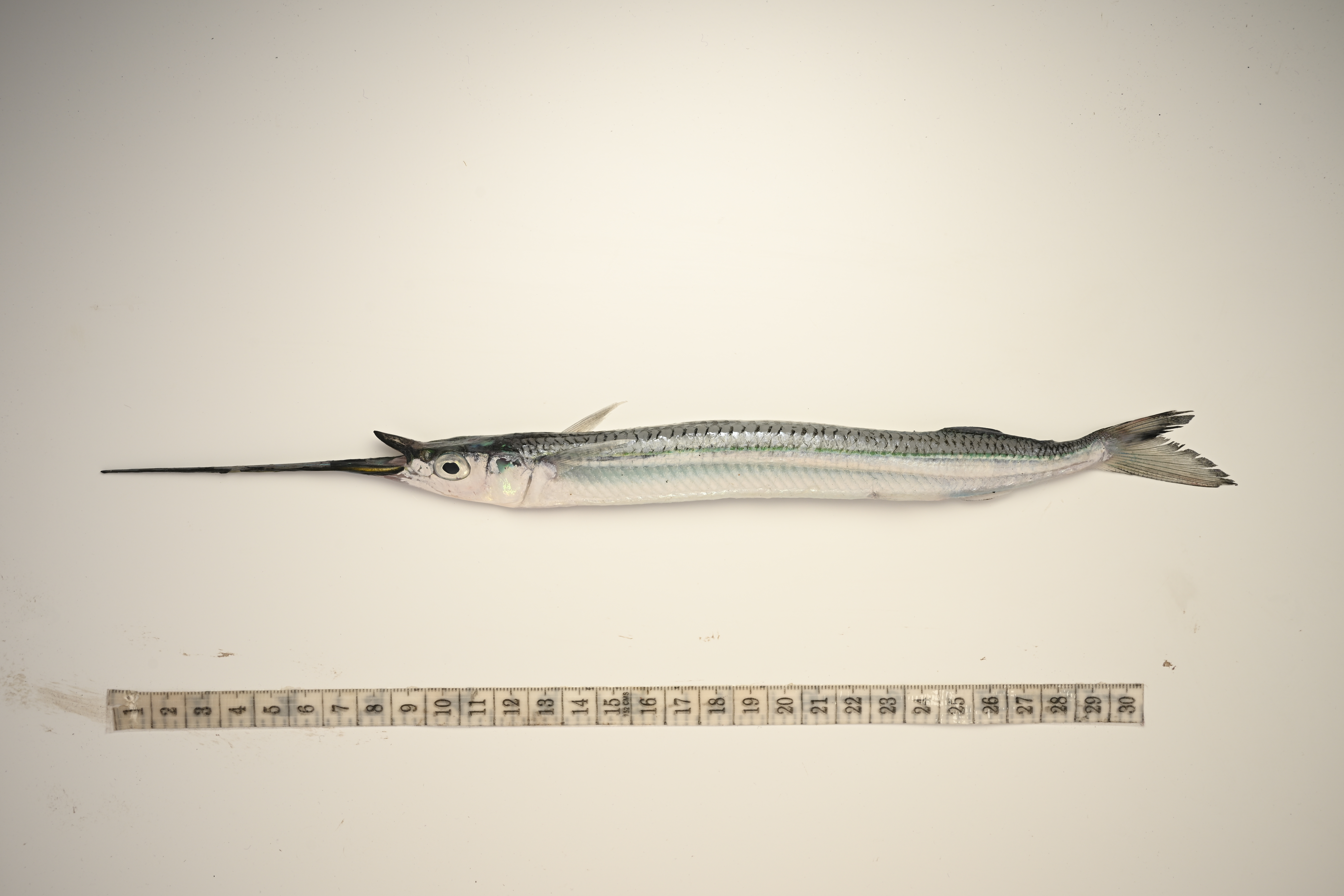
Hemiramphus sp. from Mangaluru, Karnataka, India

Hemiramphus is a genus of schooling marine fish commonly called halfbeaks, garfish, or ballyhoos, and are members of the family Hemiramphidae. They inhabit the surface of warm temperate and tropical sea, and feed on algae, plankton, and smaller fish. Hemiramphus species are edible but are more important as food fish for larger predatory species including dolphinfish and billfish.

== Species ==
There are currently 11 recognized species in this genus:

Species	Common name	Image
Hemiramphus archipelagicus Collette & Parin, 1978	Jumping halfbeak	
Hemiramphus balao Lesueur, 1821	Balao halfbeak	
Hemiramphus bermudensis Collette, 1962	Bermuda halfbeak	
Hemiramphus brasiliensis (Linnaeus, 1758)	Ballyhoo halfbeak	
Hemiramphus convexus M. C. W. Weber & de Beaufort, 1922		
Hemiramphus depauperatus Lay & E. T. Bennett, 1839	Tropical halfbeak	
Hemiramphus far (Forsskål, 1775)	Blackbarred halfbeak	
Hemiramphus lutkei Valenciennes, 1847	Lutke's halfbeak	
Hemiramphus marginatus (Forsskål, 1775)	Yellowtip halfbeak	
Hemiramphus robustus Günther, 1866	Three-by-two garfish	
Hemiramphus saltator C. H. Gilbert & Starks, 1904	Longfin halfbeak	
