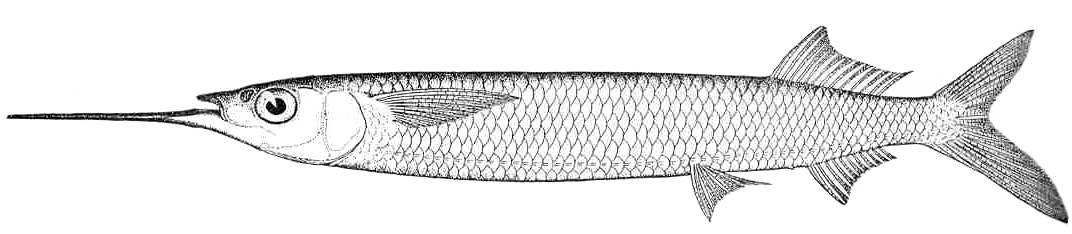

Scientific classification
- Kingdom: Animalia
- Phylum: Chordata
- Class: Actinopterygii
- Order: Beloniformes
- Family: Hemiramphidae
- Genus: Hemiramphus
- Species: H. depauperatus

Binomial name
- Hemiramphus depauperatus Lay & Bennett, 1839

= Hemiramphus depauperatus =

Polynesian halfbeak

Species of fish

Hemiramphus depauperatus, commonly known as the Polynesian halfbeak (or “Demi-bec polynésian” in French and “IheIhe” in Native Hawaiian) is a species of fish, belonging to the family Hemiramphidae found in the Pacific Ocean. The species was first misidentified as Hemiramphus eclancheri by Alvin Seale in 1906, further identified by Henry Weed Fowler to be considered Hemiramphus brasiliensis. It has since been corrected to Hemiramphus depauperatus.

== Distribution and habitat ==
Hemiramphus depauperatus can be found in the Central Pacific, including island chains such as the Hawaiian Islands, Line Islands, Society Islands, Marquesas Islands, as well as the Tuamotu Islands, Gambier islands, and the Australs Islands. They live in depths ranging from 0 to 1 meters.

== Description ==
Hemiramphus depauperatus has a silvery color with blue-green iridescence on the side. Unlike other needlefish, Hemiramphus depauperatus can be identified by its deeper body. It features a stubby, triangular shaped upper jaw, with a long needle-like lower jaw, hosting a red mark at the tip of the lower jaw. It grows up to 35cm (about 15 In.) in length. It eats smaller fish, zooplankton, and organic detritus.
