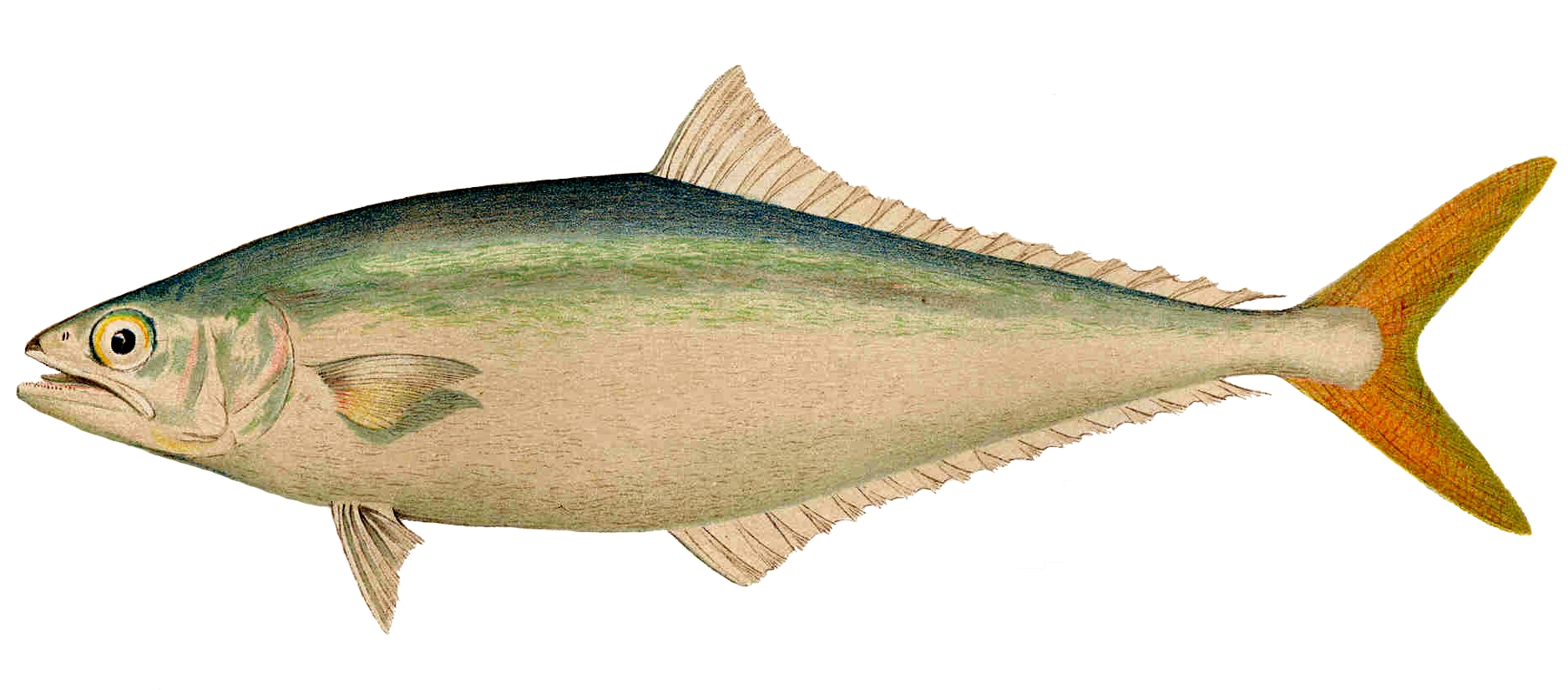
- Leatherjacket (O. saurus)

Scientific classification
- Kingdom: Animalia
- Phylum: Chordata
- Class: Actinopterygii
- Order: Carangiformes
- Suborder: Carangoidei
- Family: Trachinotidae
- Subfamily: Scomberoidinae
- Genus: Oligoplites; T. N. Gill, 1863

Type species
- Scomber saurus Bloch & Schneider, 1801

Synonyms
- Leptoligoplites Fowler, 1944

= Oligoplites =

Genus of ray-finned fishes

Oligoplites is a genus of Trachinotidae commonly known as the "leatherjackets." Species of leatherjackets are native to warmer seas off the Americas, including the East Pacific, West Atlantic, Caribbean Sea and Gulf of Mexico.

== Species ==
The currently recognized species in this genus are:

- Oligoplites altus (Günther, 1868) (longjaw leatherjacket)
- Oligoplites palometa (G. Cuvier, 1832) (Maracaibo leatherjacket)
- Oligoplites refulgens C. H. Gilbert & Starks, 1904 (shortjaw leatherjacket)
- Oligoplites saliens (Bloch, 1793) (Castin leatherjacket)
- Oligoplites saurus (Bloch & J. G. Schneider, 1801) (leatherjacket)
