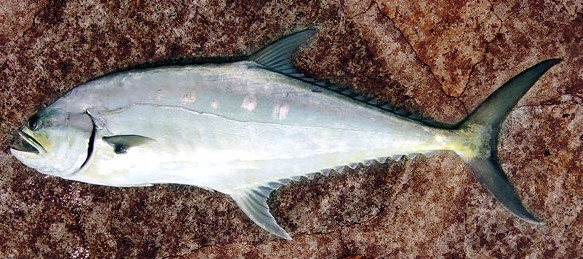
- Talang queenfish (Scomberoides commersonnianus)

Scientific classification
- Kingdom: Animalia
- Phylum: Chordata
- Class: Actinopterygii
- Order: Carangiformes
- Suborder: Carangoidei
- Family: Trachinotidae
- Subfamily: Scomberoidinae; D. S. Jordan & Gilbert, 1883

Synonyms
- Scombroidinae! (Note: "!" indicates that it is a misspelling and must not be used, the formally accepted name is Scomberoidinae.)

= Scomberoidinae =

Subfamily of ray-finned fishes

Scomberoidinae is a subfamily of ray-finned fish from the family Trachinotidae which consists of four genera and 13 species. The species in this subfamily have been given the common names leatherjacket and queenfish.

== Genera ==
The following genera are classified within the subfamily Scomberoidinae:

- Genus Oligoplites Gill, 1863
- Genus Parona C. Berg, 1895
- Genus Scomberoides Lacépède, 1801
- Genus Lichia Cuvier, 1816
