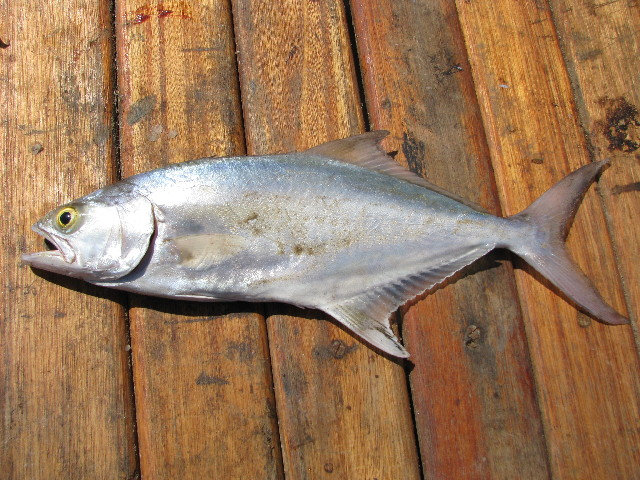

Conservation status
- Least Concern (IUCN 3.1)

Scientific classification
- Kingdom: Animalia
- Phylum: Chordata
- Class: Actinopterygii
- Order: Carangiformes
- Suborder: Carangoidei
- Family: Trachinotidae
- Subfamily: Scomberoidinae
- Genus: Lichia; Cuvier, 1816
- Species: L. amia

Binomial name
- Lichia amia (Linnaeus, 1758)

Synonyms
- List: Scomber amia Linnaeus, 1758; Caesiomorus amia (Linnaeus, 1758); Caranx amia (Linnaeus, 1758); Hypacantus amia (Linnaeus, 1758); Centronotus vadigo Lacépède, 1801; Campogramma vadigo (Lacepède, 1801); Scomber flexuosus Lichtenstein, 1823; Porthmeus argenteus Valenciennes, 1833

= Leerfish =

Leerfish Temporal range: Late Ypresian to present

Species of fish

The leerfish or garrick (Lichia amia) is a species of marine fish in the family Trachinotidae. It is the only extant member of the genus Lichia. It is native to much of the eastern Atlantic Ocean, from the Mediterranean and western Black Sea, north to France, and south along the coastal waters of western Africa, reaching as far south as eastern South Africa. They are an important species in coastal recreational fisheries, especially in Africa.

These fish can reach 1.5 m in length and more than 30 kg in weight. They inhabit the coastal wave zone where they form small shoals to hunt other smaller fish, favouring mullets. In South Africa, they primarily breed in estuaries and move to marine environments after maturation.

== Taxonomy ==
Phylogenetic evidence suggests that a deep genetic divergence exists between leerfish populations in South Africa and Angola, likely divided by the Benguela Current. It has thus been recommended that these populations be managed as two independent stocks.

== Fossil record ==
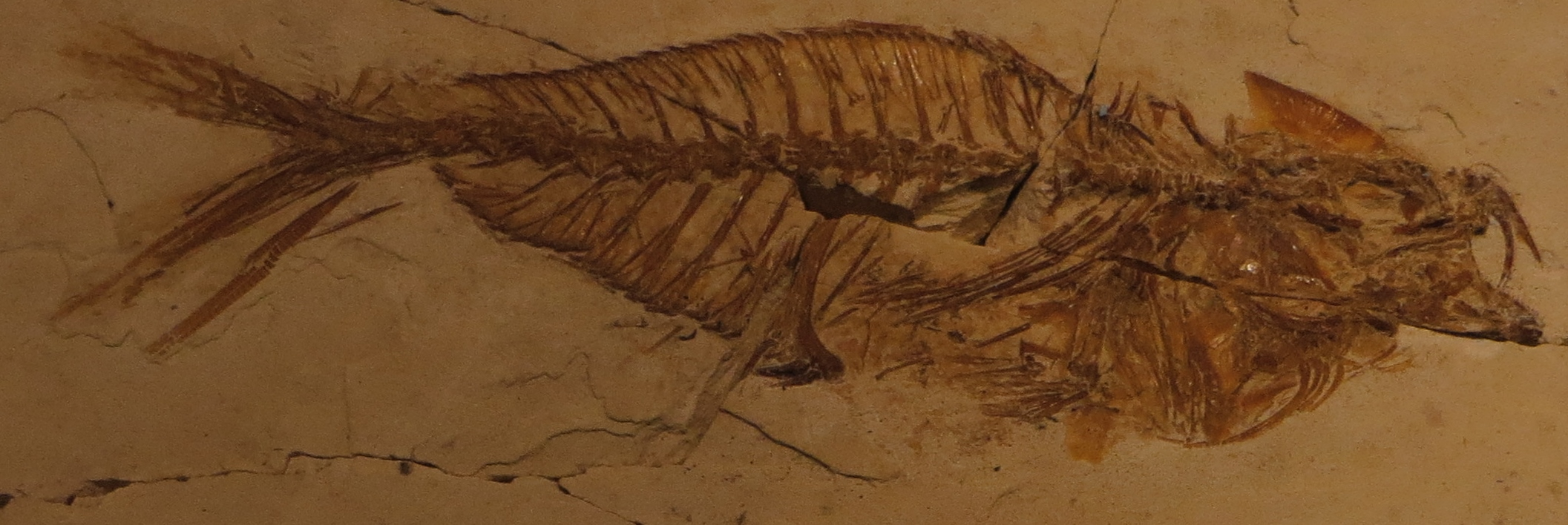
Fossil specimen of L. veronensis

An extinct relative, Lichia veronensis Bannikov, 1990, is known from the Early Eocene-aged Monte Bolca site of Italy, suggesting that the genus has inhabited its present range for nearly 50 million years. Another extinct species, Lichia alta Gorjanovic-Kramberger, 1891, is known from the Oligocene of Slovenia. Fossil Lichia remains tentatively assigned to the extant L. amia are known from the late Miocene (Messinian) of Italy, in the midst of the Messinian Salinity Crisis. This suggests that the extant L. amia must have diverged from its extinct relatives prior to this point, and that pockets of ocean likely persisted in the Mediterranean during this period of time.

== Gallery ==
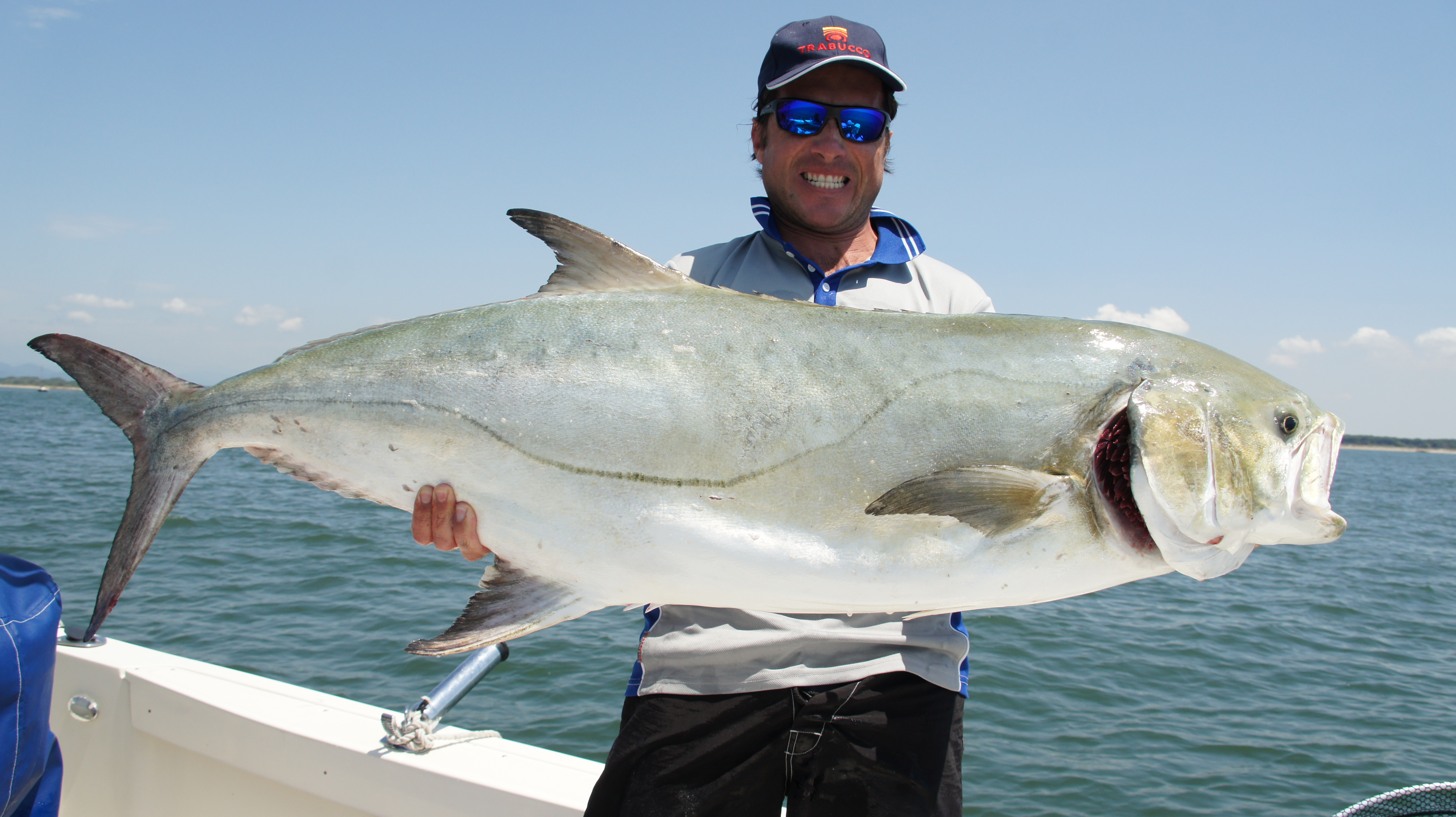
Showing size

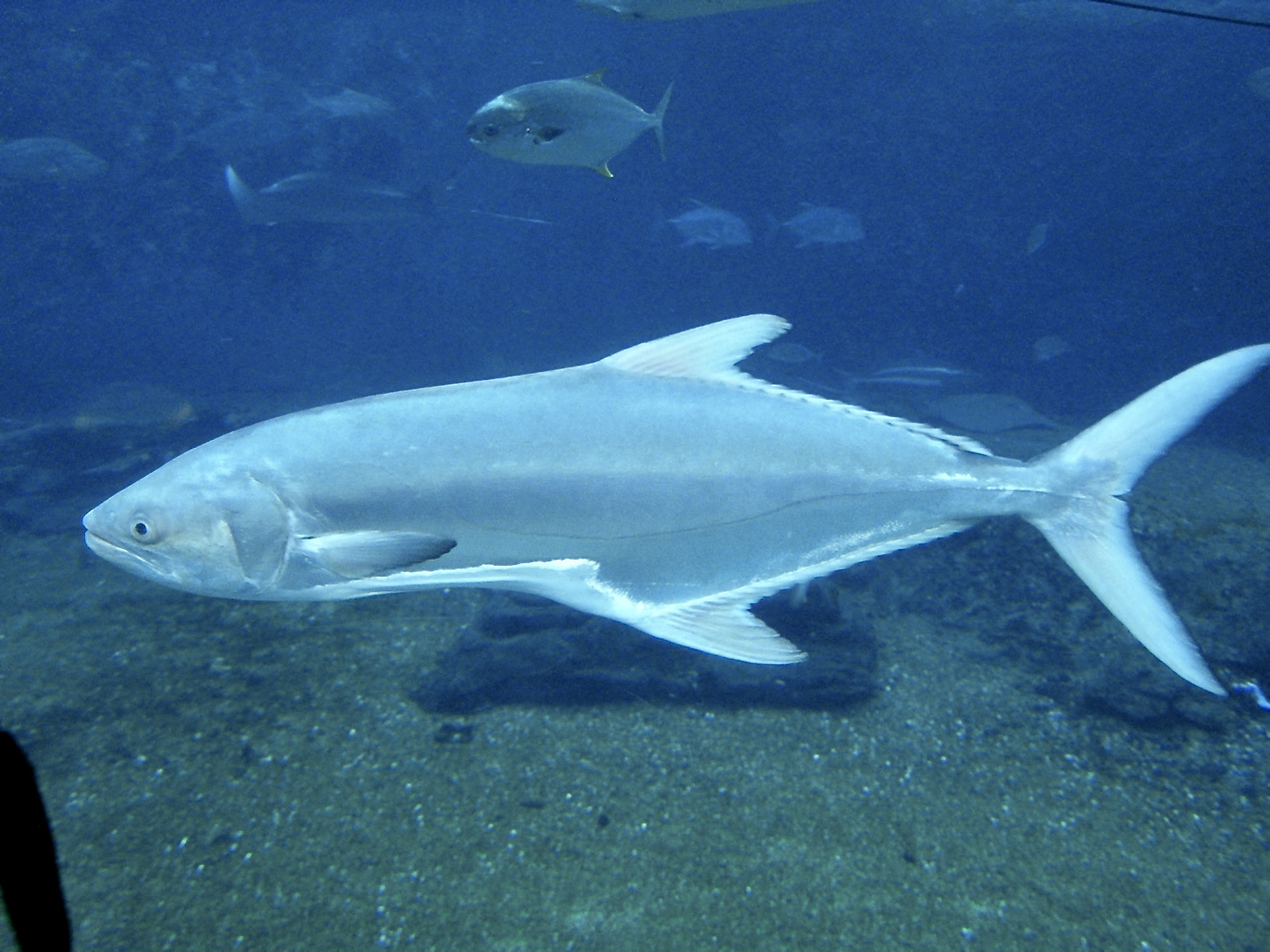
At UShaka Marine World

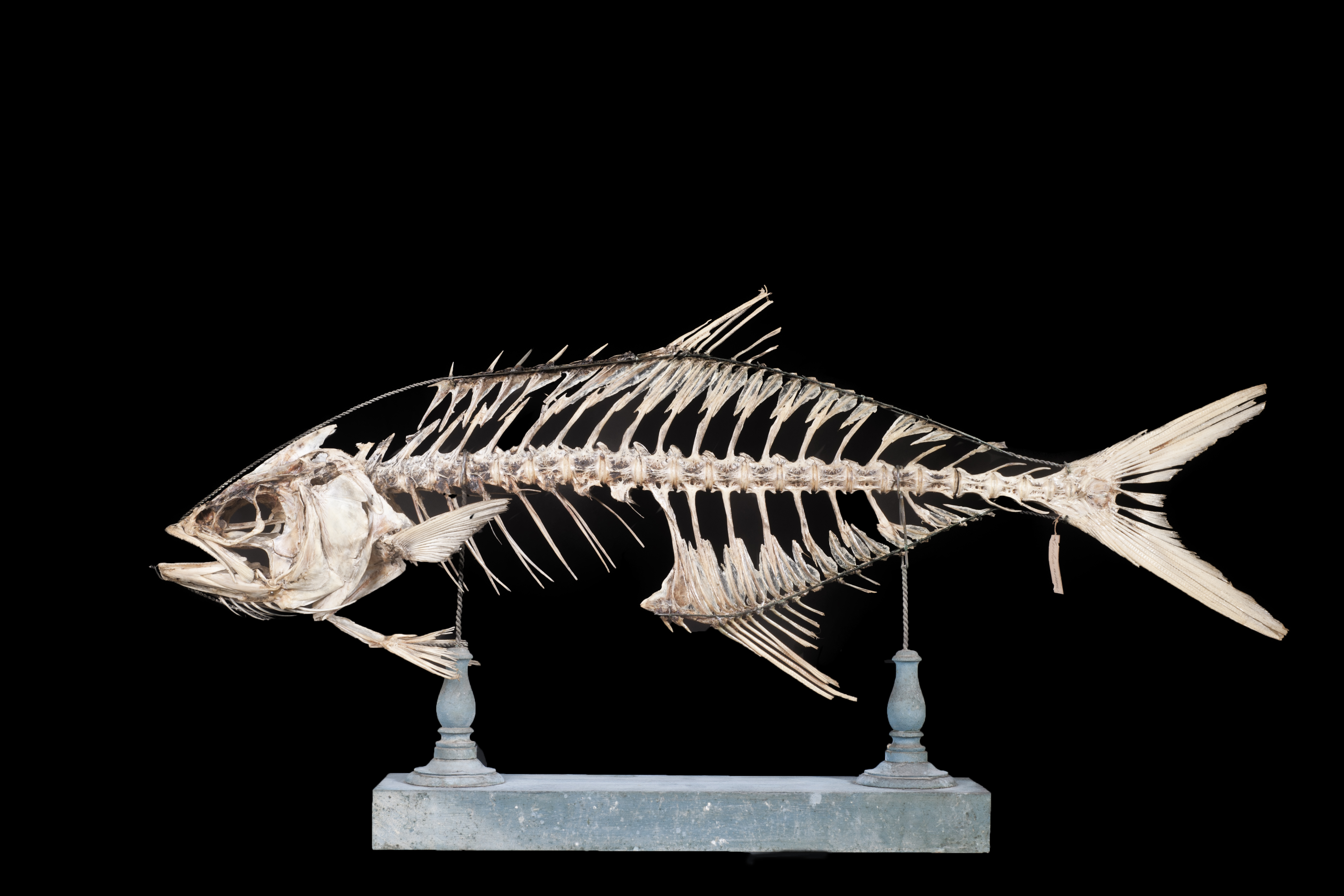
Skeleton

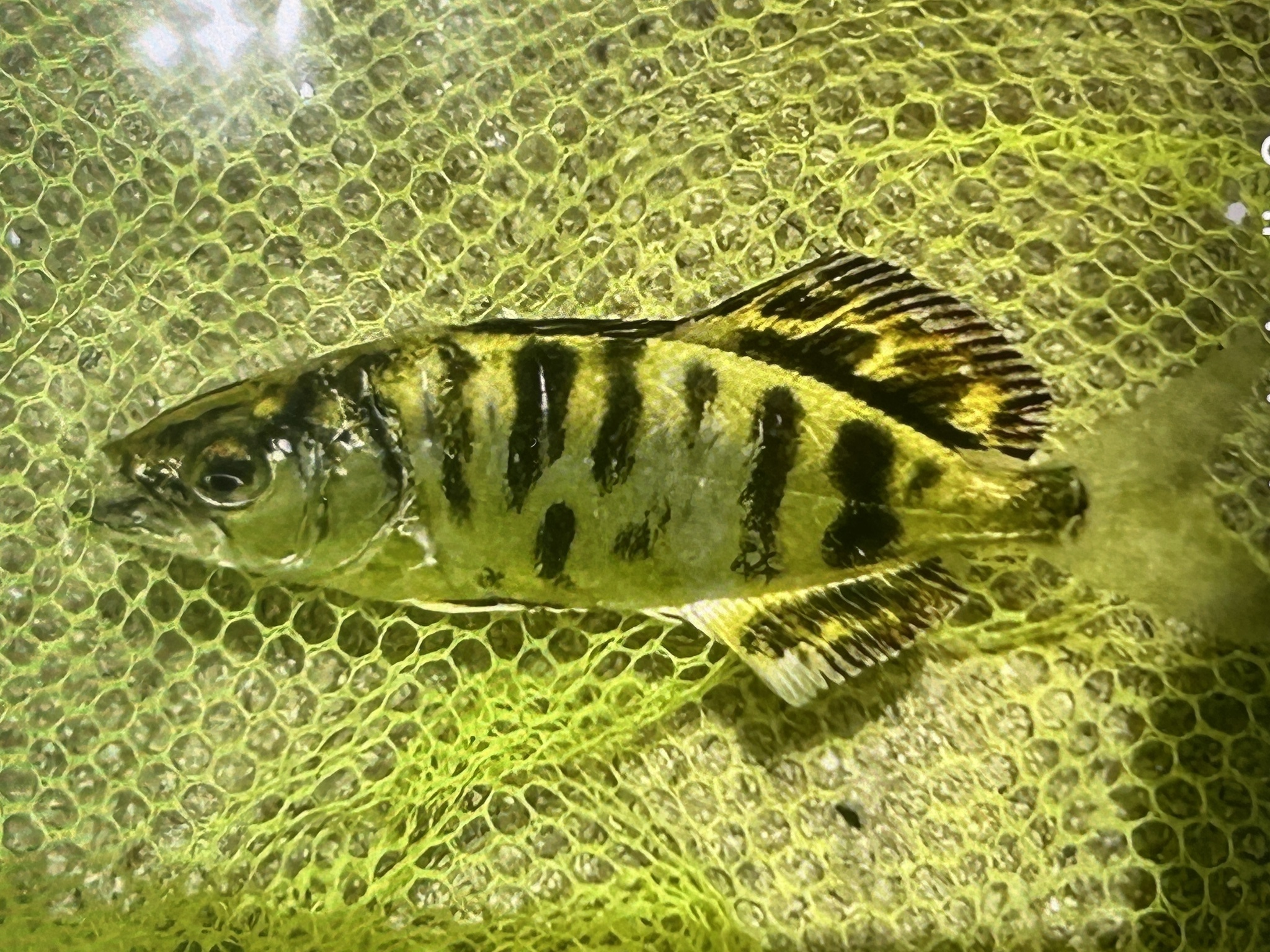
Juvenile
