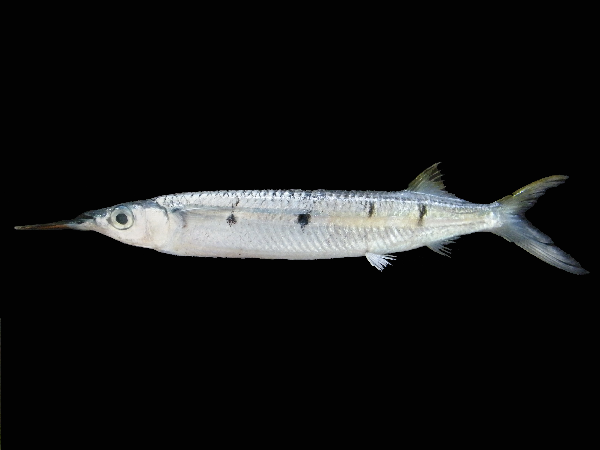

Scientific classification
- Kingdom: Animalia
- Phylum: Chordata
- Class: Actinopterygii
- Division: Teleostei
- Order: Beloniformes
- Family: Hemiramphidae
- Genus: Hemiramphus
- Species: H. far

Binomial name
- Hemiramphus far (Forsskål, 1775)

Synonyms
- Esox far Forsskål, 1775; Esox gladius Lacépède, 1803; Hemiramphus commersonii Cuvier, 1829; Hemirhamphus obesus Castelnau, 1861; Hemiramphus mocquardianus Thominot, 1886

= Hemiramphus far =

Species of fish

Hemiramphus far, the halfbeak, black-barred halfbeak, black-barred garfish, barred halfbeak, barred garfish or spotted halfbeak, is a schooling marine fish belonging to the family Hemiramphidae, the halfbeaks. It has an Indo-Pacific distribution and has invaded the eastern Mediterranean through the Suez Canal.

== Description ==
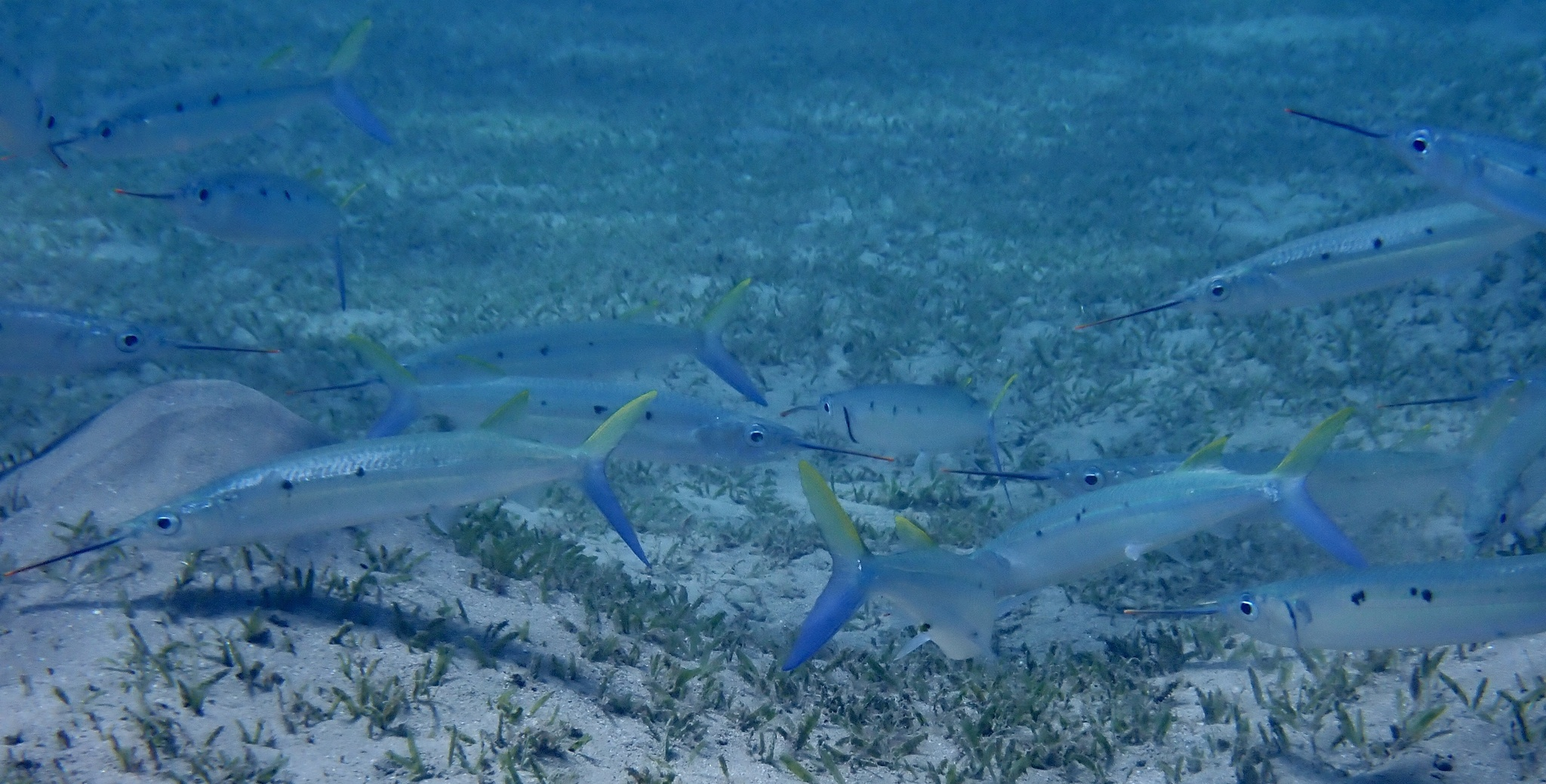
In the Red Sea

Hemiramphus far has a laterally compressed body which is elongate oval in cross-section and has a very long, beak-like lower jaw with a short upper jaw which is triangular and lacks scales; there is no preorbital ridge. The total number of gill rakers on first gill arch is 25–36 with 21–27 on the second arch. It has short pectoral fins which do not extend past the nasal fossa when they are folded forwards. There are 3–9, normally 4–6, dark vertical bars on the sides and the back is bluish in colour with silvery sides. The caudal fin is asymmetrical with the lower lobe being longer than the upper lobe. The dorsal fin and the anal fin are located towards the tail. These fins are dark in colour. The meristic formula is D,12-15, A,10-12, P,11-13. The maximum length is 33 cm.

== Distribution ==
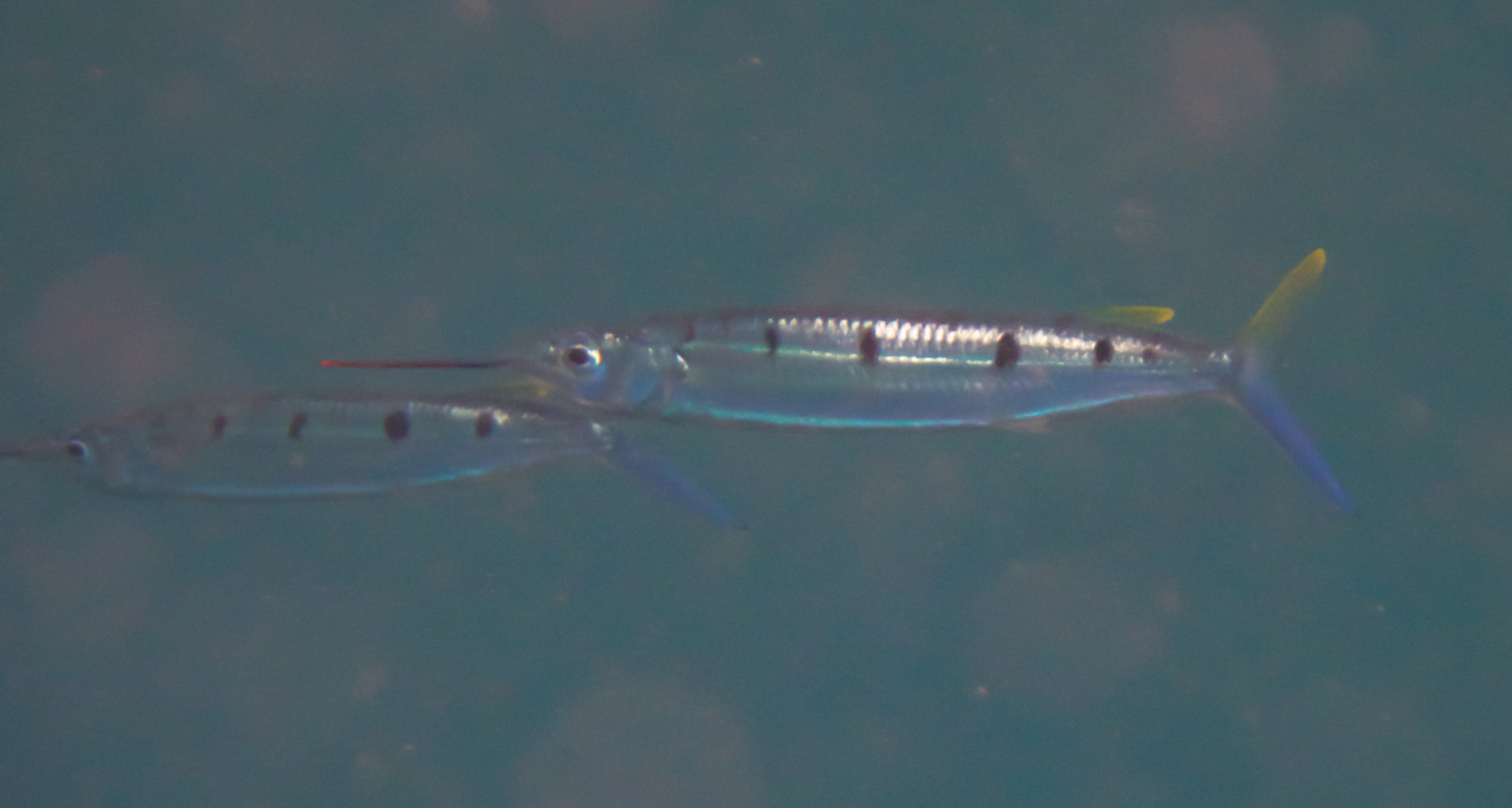
In Thailand

Hemiramphus far occurs in the Indian Ocean from the Red Sea and East Africa into the Pacific Ocean as far as Samoa, north to the Ryukyu Islands and south to northern Australia and New Caledonia. H. far was first recorded in the Mediterranean Sea off the coast of Palestine in 1927, following a likely migration through the Suez Canal and is now very abundant in the whole eastern Basin, with recent records off Algeria in the western Basin.

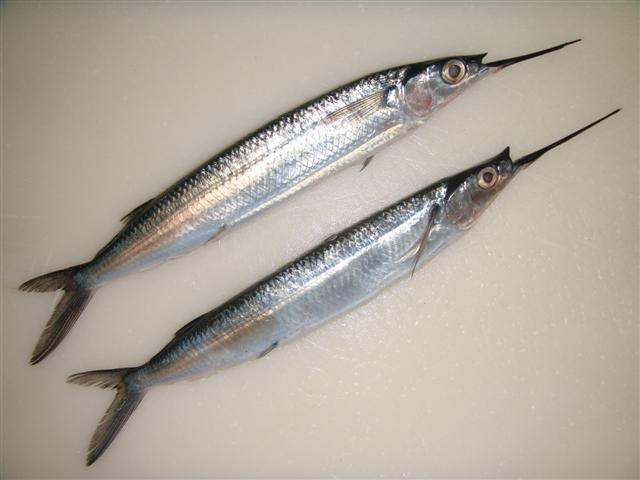

== Biology ==
Hemiramphus far is bathypelagic and is found in coastal waters of mountainous islands and continental shorelines; most frequently in areas of sea which are rich in vegetation and over sand flats. This is a sociable species which forms schools. The adults are largely phytovores feeding mainly on sea grasses and, to a lesser extent, on green algae and diatoms. It breeds in estuaries, and in the more temperate parts of its distribution in the spring and summer. The eggs are attached to vegetation by sticky threads and once the larvae hatch they are planktonic.

== Fisheries ==
Hemiramphus far is commercially exploited along the Arabian Sea coast of Pakistan where the species is considered of great economic importance. It is caught with drag nets and dip nets but is reported to escape from nets by leaping over them. The flesh is considered to be flavoursome and it is marketed both in fresh form and dried.

== Etymology ==
Hemiramphus far was described in 1775 by the Swedish zoologist Peter Forsskål as Esox far but the generic name Hemiramphus which is from the Greek hemi meaning "half" and rhamphos meaning "a bill" or "a peak" was coined by the French naturalist Georges Cuvier in 1816.

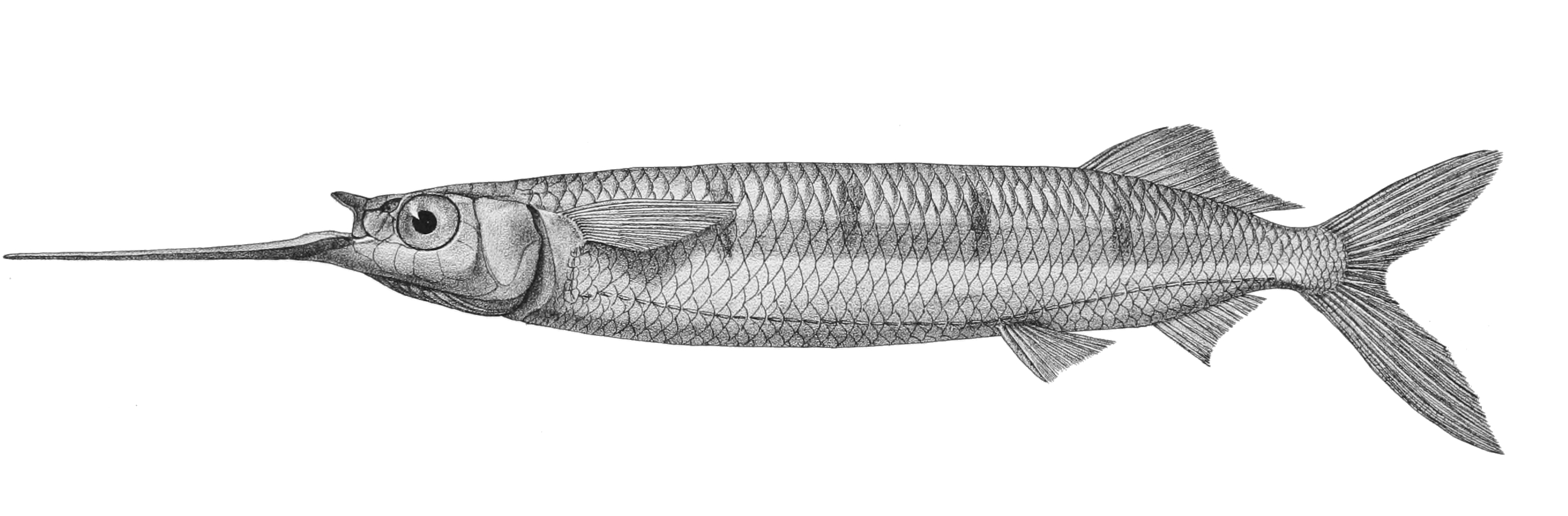
Hemiramphus far Mintern 120
