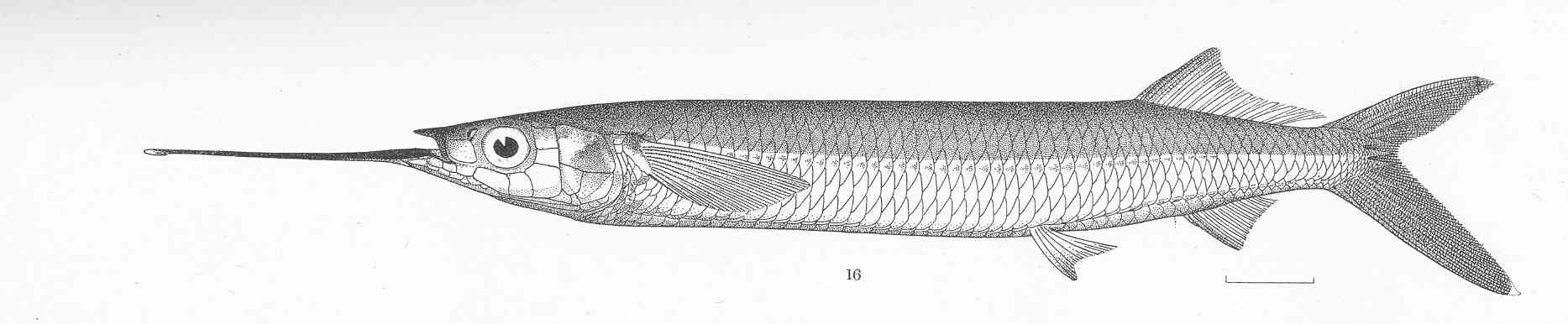

Conservation status
- Least Concern (IUCN 3.1)

Scientific classification
- Kingdom: Animalia
- Phylum: Chordata
- Class: Actinopterygii
- Order: Beloniformes
- Family: Hemiramphidae
- Genus: Hemiramphus
- Species: H. saltator

Binomial name
- Hemiramphus saltator Gilbert & Starks, 1904

= Longfin halfbeak =

Species of fish

The Longfin halfbeak (Hemiramphus saltator) is an ocean-going species of fish in the family Hemiramphidae native to the eastern Pacific Ocean.
