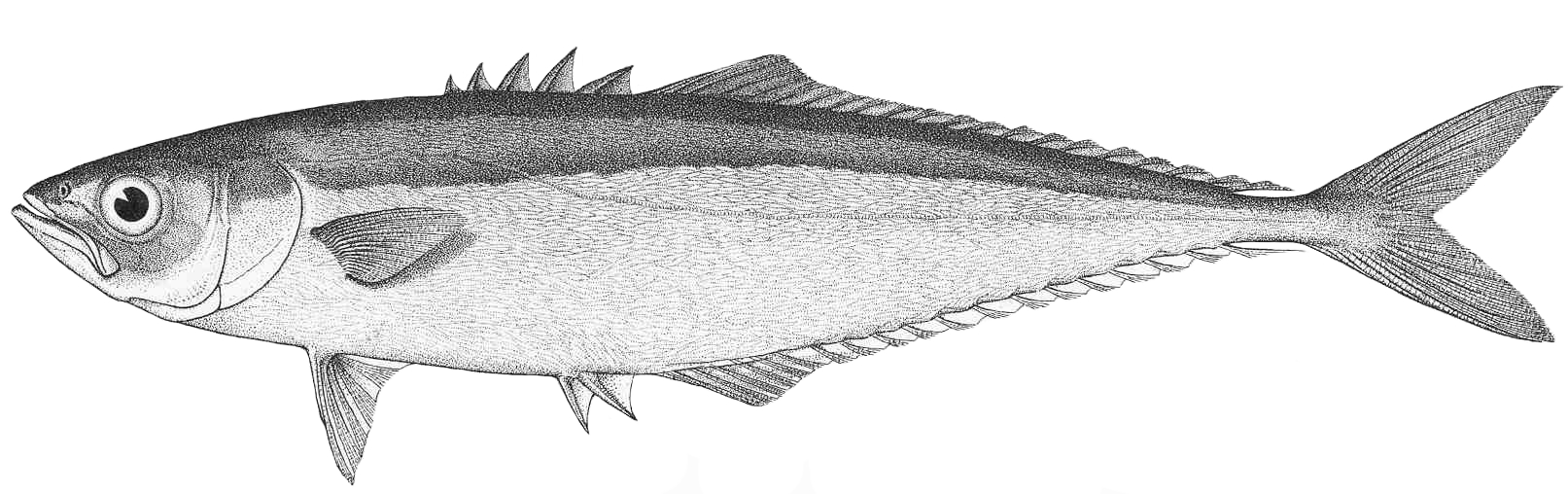

Conservation status
- Least Concern (IUCN 3.1)

Scientific classification
- Kingdom: Animalia
- Phylum: Chordata
- Class: Actinopterygii
- Order: Carangiformes
- Suborder: Carangoidei
- Family: Trachinotidae
- Genus: Oligoplites
- Species: O. refulgens

Binomial name
- Oligoplites refulgens Gilbert & Starks, 1904

= Shortjaw leatherjacket =

Species of ray-finned fish

The shortjaw leatherjacket (Oligoplites refulgens), also known as the slender leatherjacket, is a marine ray-finned fish from the family Trachinotidae which is native to the eastern Pacific, where it is found from Mexico to Ecuador. It is a pelagic species found close to shore, to depths of 30 metres (98 ft), which can withstand water of low salinity and which can enter estuaries temporarily. This species was formally described in 1904 by Charles Henry Gilbert & Edwin Chapin Starks from a type locality of Panama City market.
